= Gymnastics at the 2019 European Games – Women's artistic qualification =

Women's artistic gymnastics qualification at the 2019 European Games was held at Minsk Arena on June 27. The results of the qualification determined the qualifiers to the finals: 18 gymnasts in the all-around final, and 6 gymnasts in each of 4 apparatus finals. Two gymnasts per country could qualify to the all-around final, and one gymnast per country could qualify to the apparatus finals.

== Results ==
=== Individual all-around ===
Rank	Gymnast	Vault (gymnastics)	Uneven bars	Balance beam	Floor (gymnastics)	Total	Qual.
1	Angelina Melnikova (RUS)	14.233	14.100	13.133	12.800	54.266	Q
2	Georgia-Mae Fenton (GBR)	14.000	14.100	12.900	12.733	53.733	Q
3	Lorette Charpy (FRA)	13.366	14.000	13.400	12.533	53.299	Q
4	Anastasia Bachynska (UKR)	13.933	13.266	12.800	13.066	53.065	Q
5	Diana Varinska (UKR)	13.300	13.900	12.933	12.700	52.833	Q
6	Denisa Golgotă (ROU)	13.333	12.800	12.966	13.133	52.232	Q
7	Anastasiya Alistratava (BLR)	12.600	14.166	12.233	12.833	51.832	Q
8	Ana Filipa Martins (POR)	13.466	13.633	12.200	12.400	51.699	Q
9	Aleksandra Shchekoldina (RUS)	14.333	13.433	11.466	12.333	51.565	Q
10	Naomi Visser (NED)	13.366	14.100	11.400	12.666	51.532	Q
11	Aline Friess (FRA)	14.800	12.166	12.200	12.366	51.532	Q
12	Aneta Holasová (CZE)	13.566	12.300	12.333	12.866	51.065	Q
13	Gabriela Janik (POL)	13.500	12.733	12.100	12.200	50.533	Q
14	Bianka Schermann (HUN)	13.300	13.866	11.000	12.066	50.232	Q
15	Dominika Ponížilová (CZE)	13.300	12.700	12.166	12.000	50.166	Q
16	Senna Deriks (BEL)	13.266	13.533	11.500	11.833	50.132	Q
17	Carolann Héduit (FRA)	13.166	13.933	10.933	11.866	49.898	–
18	Elīna Vihrova (LAT)	13.266	12.400	11.500	12.600	49.766	Q
19	Angelina Radivilova (UKR)	13.266	11.033	12.500	12.966	49.765	–
20	Zója Székely (HUN)	13.233	13.466	10.400	12.333	49.432	Q
21	Emma Slevin (IRL)	13.133	12.266	11.733	11.733	48.865	R1
22	Cintia Rodríguez (ESP)	13.266	10.400	12.066	12.466	48.198	R2
23	Chiara Bunce (SVK)	13.100	11.566	11.400	11.566	47.632	R3
24	Jessica Castles (SWE)	13.266	9.433	11.833	12.966	47.498	
25	Ganna Metelitsa (BLR)	12.466	12.566	10.700	11.366	47.098	
26	Nazlı Savranbaşı (TUR)	13.200	11.466	11.000	11.100	46.766	
27	Tjaša Kysselef (SLO)	13.433	9.966	11.166	12.200	46.765	
28	Agnes Suto-Tuuha (ISL)	12.933	11.533	10.800	11.233	46.499	
29	Céleste Mordenti (LUX)	12.800	10.600	10.866	11.200	45.466	
30	Laura de Witt (NED)	13.400	12.800	8.800	10.033	45.033	
31	Bianca Frysak (AUT)	12.566	10.366	10.566	11.366	44.864	
32	Laney Madsen (BUL)	13.300	9.033	10.266	11.133	43.732	
33	Elvira Katsali (GRE)	11.700	7.400	11.833	11.233	42.166	
	Ofir Netzer (ISR)	13.366	DNS	9.300	11.166	DNF	
	Nina Derwael (BEL)		14.433	13.600			
	Marina Nekrasova (AZE)	14.200		11.966			
	Sára Péter (HUN)	14.366			11.766		
	Becky Downie (GBR)		14.433	11.666			
	Adela Šajn (SLO)			12.633	12.866		
	Anastasia Ilyankova (RUS)		14.300				
	Teja Belak (SLO)	14.033					

=== Vault ===
Rank	Gymnast	Vault 1				Vault 2				Total	Qual.
Rank	Gymnast	D Score	E Score	Pen.	Score 1	D Score	E Score	Pen.	Score 2	Total	Qual.
1	Sára Péter (HUN)	5.400	8.966		14.366	5.000	8.966		13.966	14.166	Q
2	Marina Nekrasova (AZE)	5.400	8.900	0.100	14.200	5.200	8.833		14.033	14.116	Q
3	Angelina Melnikova (RUS)	5.400	8.833		14.233	5.200	8.833	0.100	13.933	14.083	Q
4	Teja Belak (SLO)	5.400	8.633		14.033	5.000	8.900		13.900	13.966	Q
5	Gabriela Janik (POL)	4.800	8.700		13.500	4.800	8.833		13.633	13.566	Q
6	Tjaša Kysselef (SLO)	4.800	8.633		13.433	5.000	8.633		13.633	13.533	–
7	Ofir Netzer (ISR)	4.800	8.666	0.100	13.366	4.800	8.800		13.600	13.483	Q
8	Dominika Ponížilová (CZE)	5.000	8.600	0.300	13.300	4.800	8.700		13.500	13.400	R1
9	Elīna Vihrova (LAT)	4.600	8.666		13.266	4.600	8.900		13.500	13.400	R2
10	Bianka Schermann (HUN)	4.600	8.700		13.300	4.600	8.866		13.466	13.383	–
11	Denisa Golgotă (ROU)	5.400	8.233	0.300	13.333	4.800	8.566		13.366	13.349	R3

=== Uneven bars ===
Rank	Gymnast	D Score	E Score	Pen.	Total	Qual.
1	Becky Downie (GBR)	6.300	8.133		14.433	Q
2	Nina Derwael (BEL)	6.600	7.833		14.433	Q
3	Anastasia Ilyankova (RUS)	6.200	8.100		14.300	Q
4	Anastasiya Alistratava (BLR)	5.900	8.266		14.166	Q
5	Naomi Visser (NED)	5.700	8.400		14.100	Q
6	Angelina Melnikova (RUS)	5.900	8.200		14.100	–
7	Georgia-Mae Fenton (GBR)	6.100	8.000		14.100	–
8	Lorette Charpy (FRA)	5.800	8.200		14.000	Q
9	Carolann Héduit (FRA)	6.200	7.733		13.933	–
10	Diana Varinska (UKR)	6.000	7.900		13.900	R1
11	Bianka Schermann (HUN)	5.900	7.966		13.866	R2
12	Ana Filipa Martins (POR)	5.500	8.133		13.633	R3

=== Balance beam ===
Rank	Gymnast	D Score	E Score	Pen.	Total	Qual.
1	Nina Derwael (BEL)	5.300	8.300		13.600	Q
2	Lorette Charpy (FRA)	5.500	7.900		13.400	Q
3	Angelina Melnikova (RUS)	5.100	8.033		13.133	Q
4	Denisa Golgotă (ROU)	5.000	7.966		12.966	Q
5	Diana Varinska (UKR)	5.200	7.733		12.933	Q
6	Georgia-Mae Fenton (GBR)	5.200	7.700		12.900	Q
7	Anastasia Bachynska (UKR)	5.700	7.100		12.800	–
8	Adela Šajn (SLO)	5.100	7.533		12.633	R1
9	Angelina Radivilova (UKR)	5.500	7.000		12.500	–
10	Aneta Holasová (CZE)	5.000	7.333		12.333	R2
11	Anastasiya Alistratava (BLR)	5.200	7.033		12.233	R3

=== Floor ===
Rank	Gymnast	D Score	E Score	Pen.	Total	Qual.
1	Denisa Golgotă (ROU)	5.600	7.533		13.133	Q
2	Anastasia Bachynska (UKR)	5.100	7.966		13.066	Q
3	Jessica Castles (SWE)	4.900	8.066		12.966	Q
4	Angelina Radivilova (UKR)	5.400	7.666	0.100	12.966	–
5	Adela Šajn (SLO)	4.700	8.166		12.866	Q
6	Aneta Holasová (CZE)	4.900	8.066	0.100	12.866	Q
7	Anastasiya Alistratava (BLR)	4.900	8.033	0.100	12.833	Q
8	Angelina Melnikova (RUS)	5.400	7.400		12.800	R1
9	Georgia-Mae Fenton (GBR)	4.900	7.833		12.733	R2
10	Diana Varinska (UKR)	5.200	7.800	0.300	12.700	–
11	Naomi Visser (NED)	4.900	7.766		12.666	R3
