= Gymnastics at the European Games – Women's vault =

The European Games were first held in 2015 and are held every four years.

Three medals are awarded: gold for first place, silver for second place, and bronze for third place. Tie breakers have not been used in every year. In the event of a tie between two gymnasts, both names are listed, and the following position (second for a tie for first, third for a tie for second) is left empty because a medal was not awarded for that position. If three gymnastics tied for a position, the following two positions are left empty.

== Medalists ==
Year	Location	Gold	Silver	Bronze	Ref
2015	(Azerbaijan) Baku	(Switzerland) Giulia Steingruber	(Russia) Seda Tutkhalyan	(Netherlands) Lisa Top	
2019	(Belarus) Minsk	(Slovenia) Teja Belak	(Russia) Angelina Melnikova	(Hungary) Sára Péter	
