= Salvatore Maresca =

Italian artistic gymnast

- Nickname: Thor
- Born: 16 September 1993 (age 32)

Gymnastics career
- Discipline: Men's artistic gymnastics
- Country represented: Italy
- Club: Ginnastica Salerno [Italy]
- Head coach: Marcello Barbieri
Medal record
Men's artistic gymnastics
Representing Italy
World Championships
Bronze medal – third place	2021 Kitakyushu	Rings
European Championships
Bronze medal – third place	2021 Basel	Rings
FIG World Cup
Event	1st	2nd	3rd
2019 World Cup	0	0	1
2021 World Cup	1	1	0
2022 World Cup	1	0	1
Total	2	1	2

Salvatore Maresca (born 16 September 1993) is an Italian artistic gymnast. He is the 2021 World Artistic Gymnastics Championships bronze medalist in still rings and the 2021 European Championships bronze medalist in the rings. The former award he shared in a tie with Russian gymnast Grigorii Klimentev. Additionally, he received the gold medal in still rings at the 2021 FIG Artistic Gymnastics World Cup series event in Osijek. He was given the nickname "Thor" by Ginnastica Salerno club president Antonello Di Cerbo because of his strength on rings.

== Competitive history ==
Year	Event	Team	AA	FX	PH	SR	VT	PB	HB
2019	World Cup Koper					3rd place, bronze medalist(s)			
2021	World Cup Varna					2nd place, silver medalist(s)			
2021	World Cup Osijek					1st place, gold medalist(s)			
2021	European Championships					3rd place, bronze medalist(s)			
2021	World Championships					3rd place, bronze medalist(s)			
2022	World Cup Cairo					3rd place, bronze medalist(s)			
2022	World Cup Baku					1st place, gold medalist(s)			
