= 2021 FIG Artistic Gymnastics World Cup series =

International gymnastics competition series

FIG Artistic Gymnastics World Cup series
- Location: various — see locations
- Date: March 7 – September 2, 2021 see schedule

The 2021 FIG World Cup circuit in Artistic Gymnastics is a series of competitions officially organized and promoted by the International Gymnastics Federation (FIG) in 2021. A number of events were originally scheduled to take place in 2020 and serve as opportunities for gymnasts to earn points towards Olympic qualification. However, the organization of many events was heavily affected by the worldwide COVID-19 pandemic, resulting in either cancelation or postponement of some events to 2021.

One of the Apparatus World Cup series competitions (Doha), as well as the Stuttgart, Birmingham, and Tokyo All-Around World Cups will be counted towards Olympic qualification through the FIG Artistic Gymnastics World Cup series route.

== Schedule ==
Events highlighted in green will serve as Olympic qualification events.

=== World Cup series ===
Date	Location	Event	Type
~~March 10–13, 2021~~; June 23–26, 2021	(Qatar) Doha	FIG World Cup 2021	C III – Apparatus

=== World Challenge Cup series ===
Date	Location	Event	Type
May 27–30, 2021	(Bulgaria) Varna	FIG World Challenge Cup	C III – Apparatus
June 3–6, 2021	(Egypt) Cairo	FIG World Challenge Cup	C III – Apparatus
June 10–13, 2021	(Croatia) Osijek	FIG World Challenge Cup	C III – Apparatus
September 2–5, 2021	(Slovenia) Koper	FIG World Challenge Cup	C III – Apparatus
September 9–12, 2021	(Turkey) Mersin	FIG World Challenge Cup	C III – Apparatus

=== Events canceled ===
Date	Location	Event	Type	Ref
February 25–28, 2021	(Germany) Cottbus	FIG World Cup 2021	C III – Apparatus	
March 4–7, 2021	(Azerbaijan) Baku	FIG Individual Apparatus World Cup, AGF Trophy 2021	C III – Apparatus	
March 20–21, 2021	(Germany) Stuttgart	EnBW -DTB-Pokal FIG Individual All-Around World Cup	C II – All-Around	
March 27, 2021	(United Kingdom) Birmingham	FIG Individual All-Around World Cup	C II – All-Around	
May 4, 2021	(Japan) Tokyo	FIG Individual All-Around World Cup	C II – All-Around	

== Series winners ==
Apparatus	Apparatus World Cup	World Challenge Cup
Apparatus	Winner	
Men
Floor Exercise	—N/a	(Ukraine) Illia Kovtun
Pommel Horse	—N/a	(Ukraine) Illia Kovtun
Rings	—N/a	(Austria) Vinzenz Höck
Vault	—N/a	(Ukraine) Nazar Chepurnyi
Parallel Bars	—N/a	(Ukraine) Illia Kovtun
Horizontal Bar	—N/a	(Croatia) Tin Srbić
Women
Vault	—N/a	(Hungary) Csenge Bácskay
Uneven Bars	—N/a	(Ukraine) Diana Varinska
Balance Beam	—N/a	(Croatia) Ana Đerek
Floor Exercise	—N/a	(Croatia) Ana Đerek

== Medalists ==
=== Men ===
==== World Cup series ====
===== Apparatus =====
Competition	Event	Gold	Silver	Bronze
Doha	Floor Exercise	(Israel) Artem Dolgopyat	(Spain) Rayderley Zapata	(Greece) Antonios Tantalidis
Doha	Pommel Horse	(Iran) Saeid Reza Keikha	(Kazakhstan) Nariman Kurbanov	(Japan) Kohei Kameyama
Doha	Rings	(Greece) Eleftherios Petrounias	(Brazil) Arthur Zanetti	(Iran) Mehdi Ahmad Kohani
Doha	Vault	(Japan) Hidenobu Yonekura	(Ukraine) Igor Radivilov	(Israel) Andrey Medvedev
Doha	Parallel Bars	(Turkey) Ferhat Arıcan	(Ukraine) Petro Pakhnyuk	(Brazil) Caio Souza
Doha	Horizontal Bar	(Cyprus) Marios Georgiou	(Brazil) Arthur Mariano	(Kazakhstan) Milad Karimi

==== World Challenge Cup series ====
Competition	Event	Gold	Silver	Bronze
Varna	Floor Exercise	(Croatia) Aurel Benović	(Israel) Artem Dolgopyat	(United Kingdom) Hayden Skinner
Varna	Pommel Horse	(Ukraine) Illia Kovtun	(Italy) Edoardo de Rosa	(Uzbekistan) Abdulla Azimov
Varna	Rings	(Austria) Vinzenz Höck	(Italy) Salvatore Maresca	(Italy) Marco Sarrugerio
Varna	Vault	(Ukraine) Nazar Chepurnyi	(Romania) Marian Drăgulescu	(Azerbaijan) Ivan Tikhonov
Varna	Parallel Bars	(Ukraine) Illia Kovtun	(Russia) Sergei Eltcov	(Lithuania) Robert Tvorogal
Varna	Horizontal Bar	(Croatia) Tin Srbić	(Italy) Carlo Macchini	(Hungary) Krisztián Balázs
Cairo	Floor Exercise	(Ukraine) Illia Kovtun	(Lithuania) Tomas Kuzmickas	(Cyprus) Michalis Chari
Cairo	Pommel Horse	(Ukraine) Illia Kovtun	(Croatia) Jakov Vlahek	(Ukraine) Nazar Chepurnyi
Cairo	Rings	(Egypt) Ali Zahran	(Azerbaijan) Javidan Babayev	(Ukraine) Roman Vashchenko
Cairo	Vault	(Ukraine) Nazar Chepurnyi	(Syria) Lais Najjar	(Ukraine) Illia Kovtun
Cairo	Parallel Bars	(Lithuania) Robert Tvorogal	(Cyprus) Ilias Georgiou	(Ukraine) Illia Kovtun
Cairo	Horizontal Bar	(Ukraine) Illia Kovtun	(Cyprus) Ilias Georgiou	(Lithuania) Robert Tvorogal
Osijek	Floor Exercise	(Kazakhstan) Milad Karimi	(Croatia) Aurel Benović	(United Kingdom) Hayden Skinner
Osijek	Pommel Horse	(Albania) Matvei Petrov	(Kazakhstan) Nariman Kurbanov	(Hungary) Krisztofer Mészáros
Osijek	Rings	(Italy) Salvatore Maresca	(Austria) Vinzenz Höck	(Turkey) Adem Asil
Osijek	Vault	(Ukraine) Igor Radivilov	(Turkey) Adem Asil	(Kazakhstan) Milad Karimi
Osijek	Parallel Bars	(Turkey) Ferhat Arıcan	(Kazakhstan) Milad Karimi	(Bulgaria) David Huddleston
Osijek	Horizontal Bar	(Croatia) Tin Srbić	(Hungary) Krisztián Balázs	(Turkey) Adem Asil
Koper	Floor Exercise	(Russia) Kirill Prokopev	(Canada) William Émard	(Ukraine) Illia Kovtun
Koper	Pommel Horse	(Albania) Matvei Petrov	(Ukraine) Illia Kovtun	(Croatia) Filip Ude
Koper	Rings	(Austria) Vinzenz Höck	(Russia) Ilya Kibartas	(Italy) Andrea Cingolani
Koper	Vault	(Israel) Andrey Medvedev	(United Kingdom) Courtney Tulloch	(Canada) Félix Dolci
Koper	Parallel Bars	(Turkey) Sercan Demir	(Kazakhstan) Farukh Nabiyev	(Italy) Mario Macchiati
Koper	Horizontal Bar	(Belgium) Maxime Gentges	(Hungary) Dávid Vecsernyés	(Canada) Félix Dolci
Mersin	Floor Exercise	(Canada) Félix Dolci	(Ukraine) Illia Kovtun	(Canada) William Émard
Mersin	Pommel Horse	(Jordan) Ahmad Abu al Soud	(Ukraine) Illia Kovtun	(Croatia) Filip Ude
Mersin	Rings	(Russia) Grigorii Klimentev	(Canada) William Émard	(Russia) Viktor Kalyuzhin
Mersin	Vault	(Canada) William Émard	(Kazakhstan) Milad Karimi	(Romania) Gabriel Burtănete
Mersin	Parallel Bars	(Ukraine) Illia Kovtun	(Russia) Viktor Kalyuzhin	(Switzerland) Henji Mboyo
Mersin	Horizontal Bar	(Hungary) Dávid Vecsernyés	(Canada) Félix Dolci	(Lithuania) Robert Tvorogal

=== Women ===
==== World Cup series ====
===== Apparatus =====
Competition	Event	Gold	Silver	Bronze
Doha	Vault	(Uzbekistan) Oksana Chusovitina	(France) Coline Devillard	(Egypt) Nancy Taman
Doha	Uneven Bars	(Brazil) Rebeca Andrade	(Ukraine) Anastasia Bachynska	(Brazil) Lorrane Oliveira
Doha	Balance Beam	(Ukraine) Diana Varinska	(Hungary) Zsófia Kovács	(Brazil) Rebeca Andrade
Doha	Floor Exercise	(Italy) Vanessa Ferrari	(Italy) Lara Mori	(Brazil) Lorrane Oliveira

==== World Challenge Cup series ====
Competition	Event	Gold	Silver	Bronze
Varna	Vault	(France) Coline Devillard	(Russia) Uliana Perebinosova	(Uzbekistan) Oksana Chusovitina
Varna	Uneven Bars	(Russia) Uliana Perebinosova	(Ukraine) Diana Varinska	(United Kingdom) Kelly Simm
Varna	Balance Beam	(Ukraine) Anastasiia Bachynska	(France) Marine Boyer	(United Kingdom) Ondine Achampong
Varna	Floor Exercise	(Uzbekistan) Dildora Aripova (Hungary) Hanna Szujó	—N/a	(Russia) Uliana Perebinosova
Cairo	Vault	(Egypt) Nancy Taman	(Hungary) Bianka Schermann	(Hungary) Csenge Bácskay
Cairo	Uneven Bars	(Ukraine) Diana Varinska	(Hungary) Zója Székely	(Romania) Larisa Iordache
Cairo	Balance Beam	(Romania) Larisa Iordache	(Ukraine) Diana Varinska	(Egypt) Zeina Ibrahim
Cairo	Floor Exercise	(Hungary) Zója Székely	(Ukraine) Diana Varinska	(Egypt) Mandy Mohamed
Osijek	Vault	(Hungary) Csenge Bácskay	(Slovenia) Tjaša Kysselef	(Czech Republic) Dominika Ponížilová
Osijek	Uneven Bars	(Belgium) Nina Derwael	(Hungary) Zsófia Kovács	(Belgium) Lisa Vaelen
Osijek	Balance Beam	(Belgium) Nina Derwael	(Ukraine) Diana Varinska	(Croatia) Ana Đerek
Osijek	Floor Exercise	(Croatia) Ana Đerek	(Austria) Marlies Männersdorfer	(Latvia) Elīna Vihrova
Koper	Vault	(Slovenia) Tjaša Kysselef	(Hungary) Csenge Bácskay	(Ukraine) Yana Fedorova
Koper	Uneven Bars	(Slovakia) Barbora Mokošová	(Hungary) Zója Székely	(Slovenia) Lucija Hribar
Koper	Balance Beam	(Canada) Cassandra Lee	(Croatia) Ana Đerek	(Hungary) Zója Székely
Koper	Floor Exercise	(United Kingdom) Claudia Fragapane	(Croatia) Ana Đerek	(Hungary) Dorina Böczögő
Mersin	Vault	(Hungary) Csenge Bácskay	(Slovenia) Tjaša Kysselef	(Lithuania) Agata Vostruchovaitė
Mersin	Uneven Bars	(Hungary) Zója Székely	(Ukraine) Yelyzaveta Hubareva	(Slovenia) Lucija Hribar
Mersin	Balance Beam	(Romania) Maria Ceplinschi	(Croatia) Ana Đerek	(Hungary) Csenge Bácskay
Mersin	Floor Exercise	(Romania) Maria Ceplinschi	(Hungary) Dorina Böczögő	(Croatia) Ana Đerek

== Medal table ==
=== Overall ===
Rank	Nation	Gold	Silver	Bronze	Total
1	Ukraine	12	11	6	29
2	Hungary	6	9	6	21
3	Croatia	4	5	4	13
4	Russia	3	4	2	9
5	Canada	3	3	3	9
6	Romania	3	1	2	6
6	Turkey	3	1	2	6
8	Belgium	3	0	1	4
9	Italy	2	4	3	9
10	Austria	2	2	0	4
11	Israel	2	1	1	4
12	Egypt	2	0	3	5
13	Uzbekistan	2	0	2	4
14	Albania	2	0	0	2
15	Kazakhstan	1	5	2	8
16	Brazil	1	2	4	7
17	Slovenia	1	2	2	5
18	Cyprus	1	2	1	4
19	France	1	2	0	3
20	Great Britain	1	1	4	6
20	Lithuania	1	1	4	6
22	Greece	1	0	1	2
22	Iran	1	0	1	2
22	Japan	1	0	1	2
25	Jordan	1	0	0	1
25	Slovakia	1	0	0	1
27	Azerbaijan	0	1	1	2
28	Spain	0	1	0	1
28	Syria	0	1	0	1
30	Bulgaria	0	0	1	1
30	Czech Republic	0	0	1	1
30	Latvia	0	0	1	1
30	Switzerland	0	0	1	1
Totals (33 entries)		61	59	60	180

=== Men ===
Rank	Nation	Gold	Silver	Bronze	Total
1	Ukraine	9	5	5	19
2	Croatia	3	2	2	7
3	Turkey	3	1	2	6
4	Canada	2	3	3	8
5	Russia	2	3	1	6
6	Israel	2	1	1	4
7	Austria	2	1	0	3
8	Albania	2	0	0	2
9	Kazakhstan	1	5	2	8
10	Italy	1	3	3	7
11	Hungary	1	2	2	5
12	Cyprus	1	2	1	4
13	Lithuania	1	1	3	5
14	Greece	1	0	1	2
14	Iran	1	0	1	2
14	Japan	1	0	1	2
17	Belgium	1	0	0	1
17	Egypt	1	0	0	1
17	Jordan	1	0	0	1
20	Brazil	0	2	1	3
21	Great Britain	0	1	2	3
22	Azerbaijan	0	1	1	2
22	Romania	0	1	1	2
24	Spain	0	1	0	1
24	Syria	0	1	0	1
26	Bulgaria	0	0	1	1
26	Switzerland	0	0	1	1
26	Uzbekistan	0	0	1	1
Totals (28 entries)		36	36	36	108

=== Women ===
Rank	Nation	Gold	Silver	Bronze	Total
1	Hungary	5	7	4	16
2	Ukraine	3	6	1	10
3	Romania	3	0	1	4
4	Belgium	2	0	1	3
4	Uzbekistan	2	0	1	3
6	Croatia	1	3	2	6
7	Slovenia	1	2	2	5
8	France	1	2	0	3
9	Russia	1	1	1	3
10	Italy	1	1	0	2
11	Brazil	1	0	3	4
11	Egypt	1	0	3	4
13	Great Britain	1	0	2	3
14	Canada	1	0	0	1
14	Slovakia	1	0	0	1
16	Austria	0	1	0	1
17	Czech Republic	0	0	1	1
17	Latvia	0	0	1	1
17	Lithuania	0	0	1	1
Totals (19 entries)		25	23	24	72

== See also ==
- 2021 FIG Rhythmic Gymnastics World Cup series
