= Csenge Bácskay =

Hungarian artistic gymnast (born 2003)

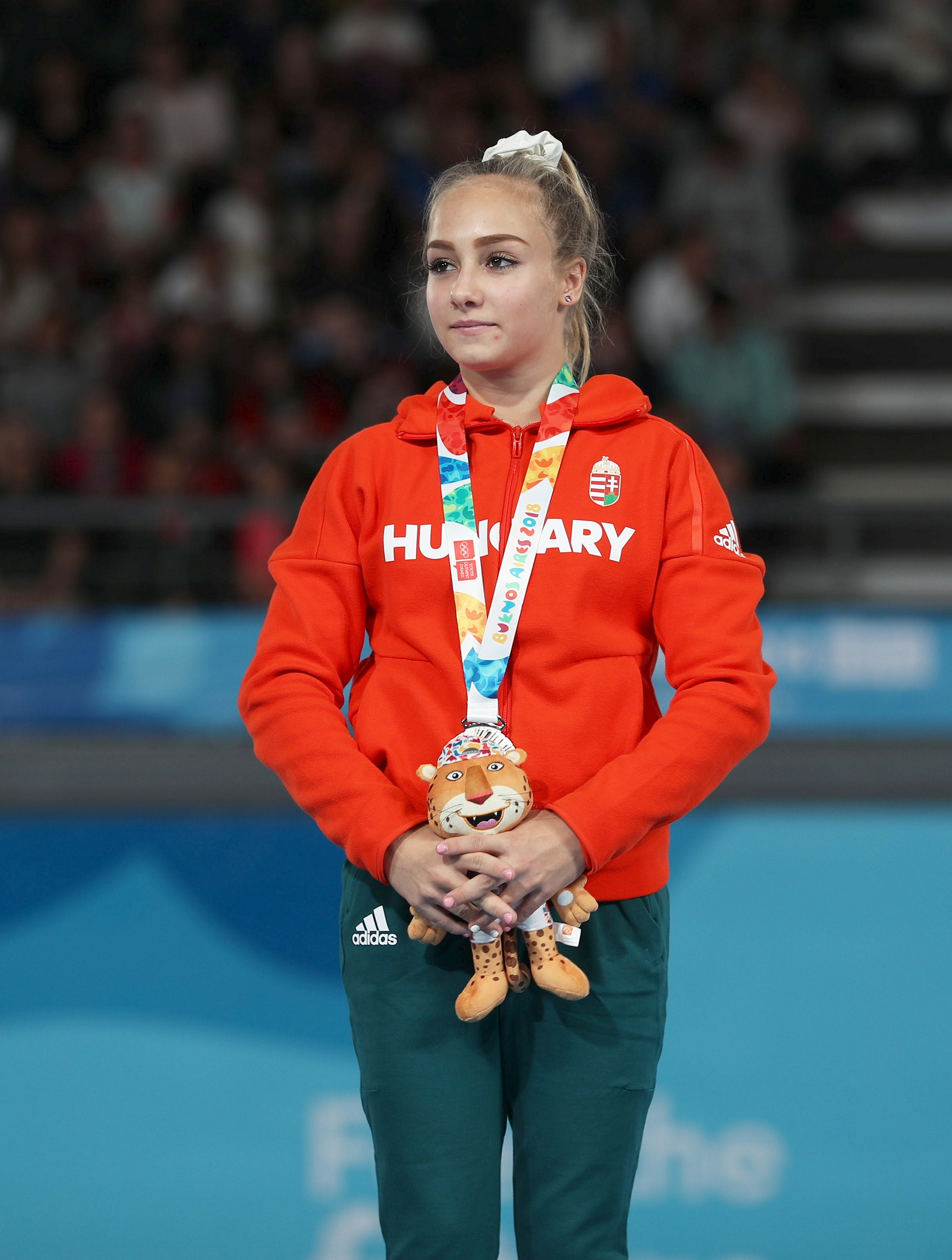
- Bácskay at the 2018 Youth Olympic Games

Personal information
- Full name: Csenge Maria Bácskay
- Born: 4 April 2003 (age 23) Budapest, Hungary
- Height: 5 ft 2 in (157 cm)

Gymnastics career
- Discipline: Women's artistic gymnastics
- Country represented: Hungary (2014–present)
- College team: Nebraska Cornhuskers (2023–24); Georgia Gym Dogs (2025–26)
- Club: Postás SE
- Head coach: Imre Draskoczy
Medal record
Artistic gymnastics
Representing Hungary
European Championships
Bronze medal – third place	2020 Mersin	Team
Youth Olympic Games
Silver medal – second place	2018 Buenos Aires	Vault
FIG World Cup
Event	1st	2nd	3rd
Apparatus World Cup	0	2	0
World Challenge Cup	2	3	2
Total	2	5	2

Csenge Mária Bácskay (born 4 April 2003) is a Hungarian artistic gymnast and the 2018 Youth Olympic silver medalist on vault. Additionally, she was a member of the team that won bronze at the 2020 European Championships. She represented Hungary at the 2024 Summer Olympics.

== Early life ==
Bácskay was born in Budapest, Hungary, on 4 April 2003, to Zsolt Bácskay and Barbara Bácskayné Abonyi. She has two younger siblings. She began gymnastics when she was three years old.

== Junior gymnastics career ==
=== 2014–2016 ===
In 2014, Bácskay competed at the Gym Festival Trnava where she helped Hungary finish fourth in the Youth Team final, and individually, she finished eighth in the all-around. In 2016, she competed at the Olympic Hopes Cup where she finished 19th in the all-around and eighth in the balance beam finals. Later that year, she competed at the Eva Kanyo Cup where she finished fourth among the Espoirs in the all-around and won silver on the vault, gold on uneven bars, and bronze on balance beam and floor exercise. She also competed at the Győr Trophy where she placed seventh in the all-around and second on floor exercise.

=== 2017 ===
Bácskay began the season at the Elek Matolay Memorial where she placed first in the all-around, on balance beam, and floor exercise and second on vault. In May, she represented Hungary at International GymSport where she placed fourth in the all-around and won gold on vault. In June, she competed at Gym Festival Trnava where she placed sixth in the all-around, second on vault, and third on floor exercise. Later in the summer, Bácskay competed at the Slovakian Junior Friendly where Hungary won the gold in the team event. In July, she competed at the 2017 European Youth Olympic Festival where Hungary placed fourth in the team final, and individually, Bácskay placed eighth on vault and fourth on floor. In November, she competed at the Olympic Hopes Cup where she placed 18th in the all-around. She ended the year competing at the Hungarian Master Championships where she placed eleventh in the all-around, second on vault, and sixth on floor.

=== 2018 ===
Bácskay started the 2018 season competing at Gymnasiade where she finished seventh in the all-around, second on vault behind Anastasia Bachynska of Ukraine, and seventh on uneven bars and balance beam. Then at the Youth Olympic Games Qualifier, she finished eighth in the all-around and qualified a spot for Hungary at the 2018 Summer Youth Olympics. She then helped Hungary win a friendly meet against the Czech Republic and Austria. At the Hungarian Event Championships, she won gold medals on vault and floor, and she won silver on uneven bars and bronze on balance beam.

In August, Bácskay represented Hungary at the 2018 European Championships. She qualified for the vault final and finished in sixth place. In October, Bácskay represented Hungary at the 2018 Youth Olympic Games. She qualified for the all-around and vault finals. In the all-around final, she placed 14th. Then in the vault final, she won the silver medal behind Giorgia Villa of Italy and ahead of Emma Spence of Canada.

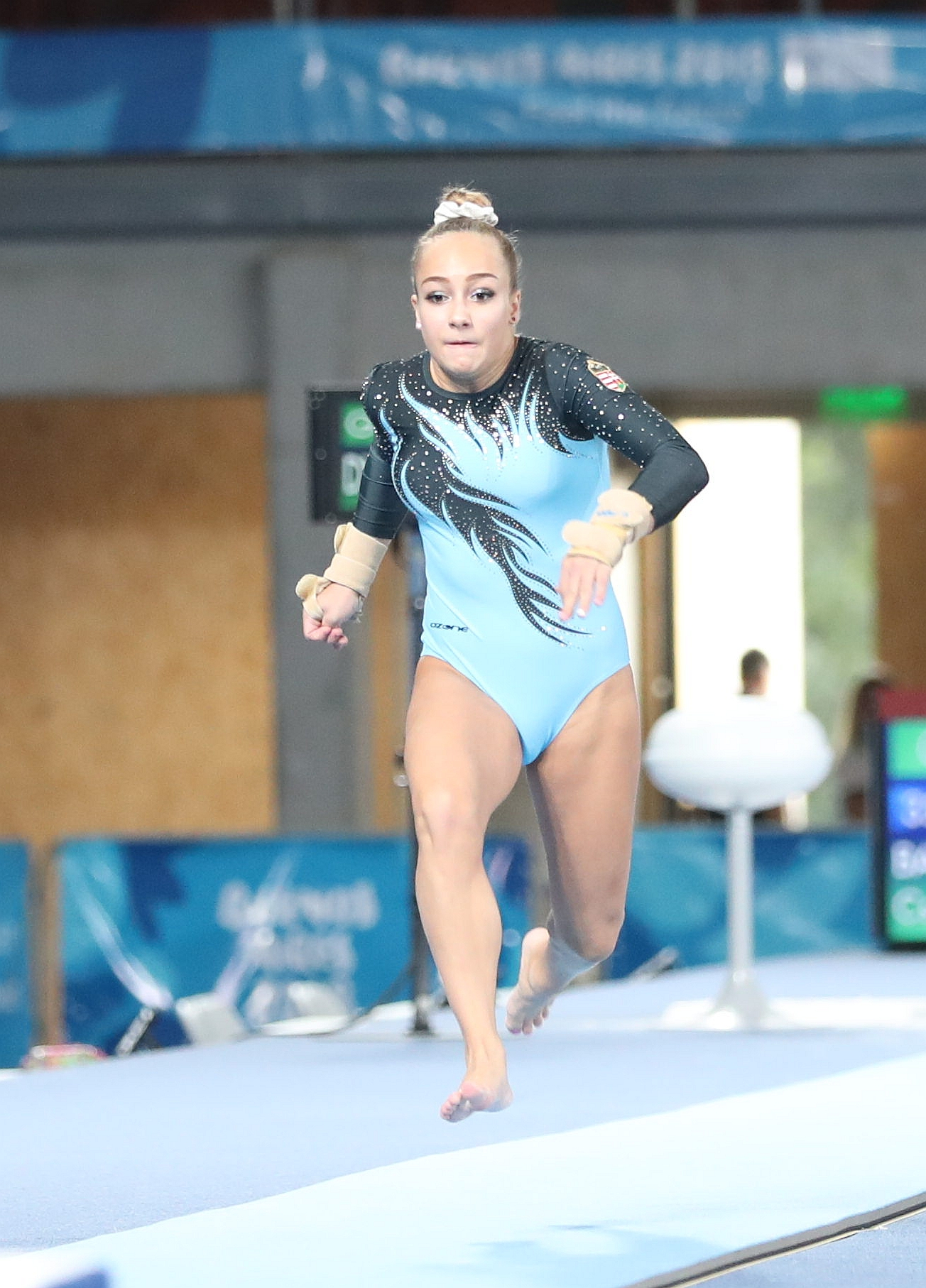
Vault qualifications

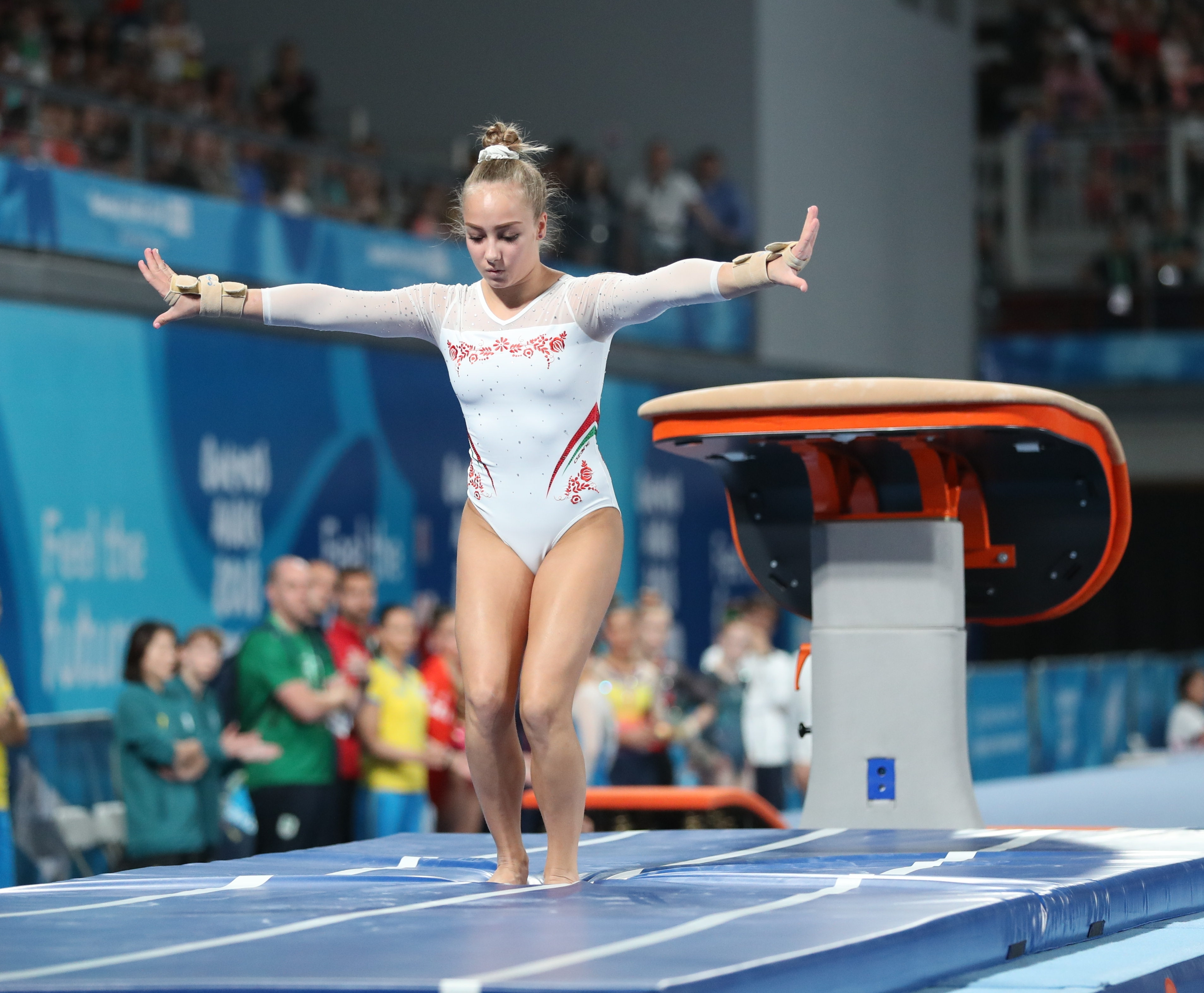
Vault final

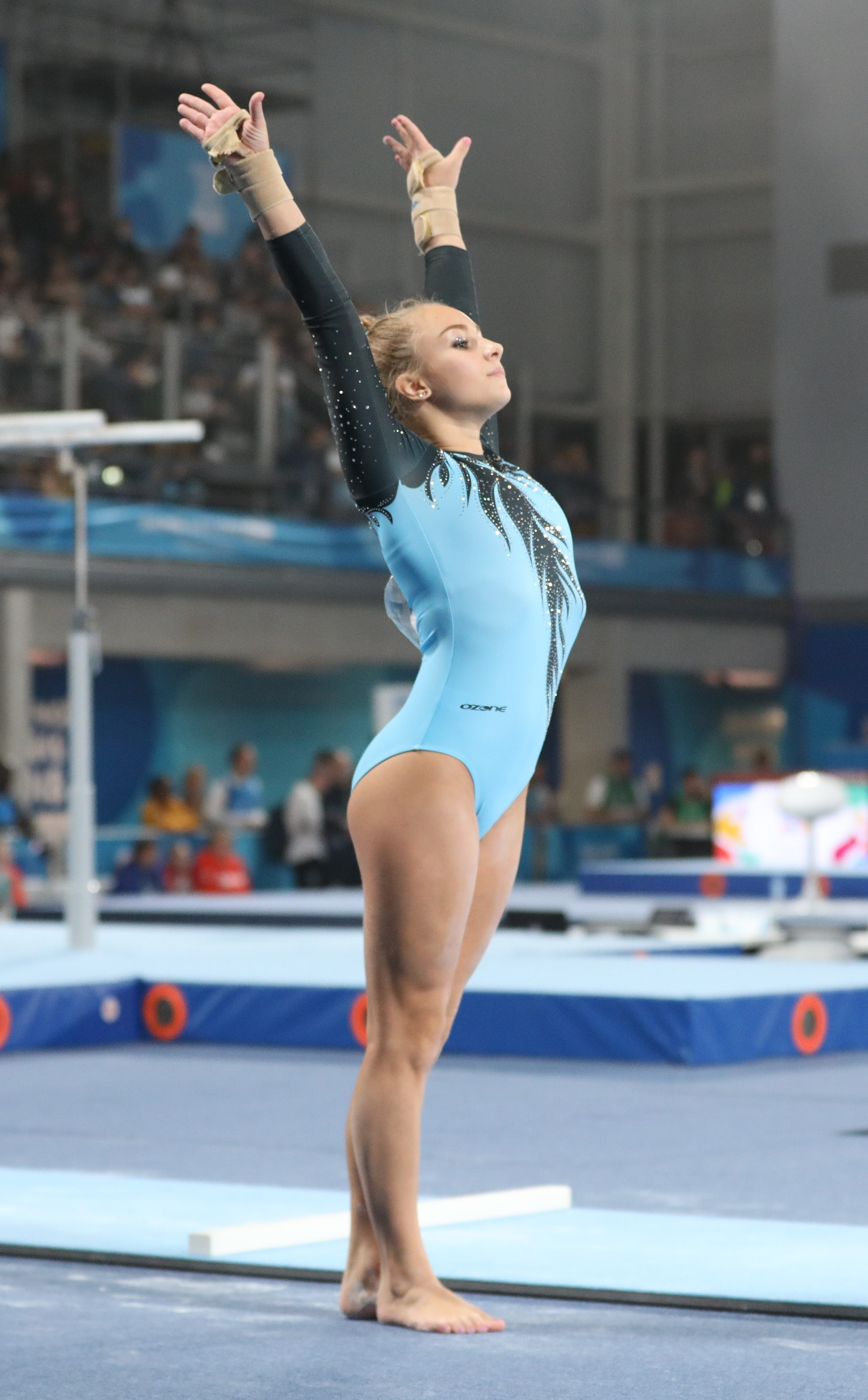
All-around final

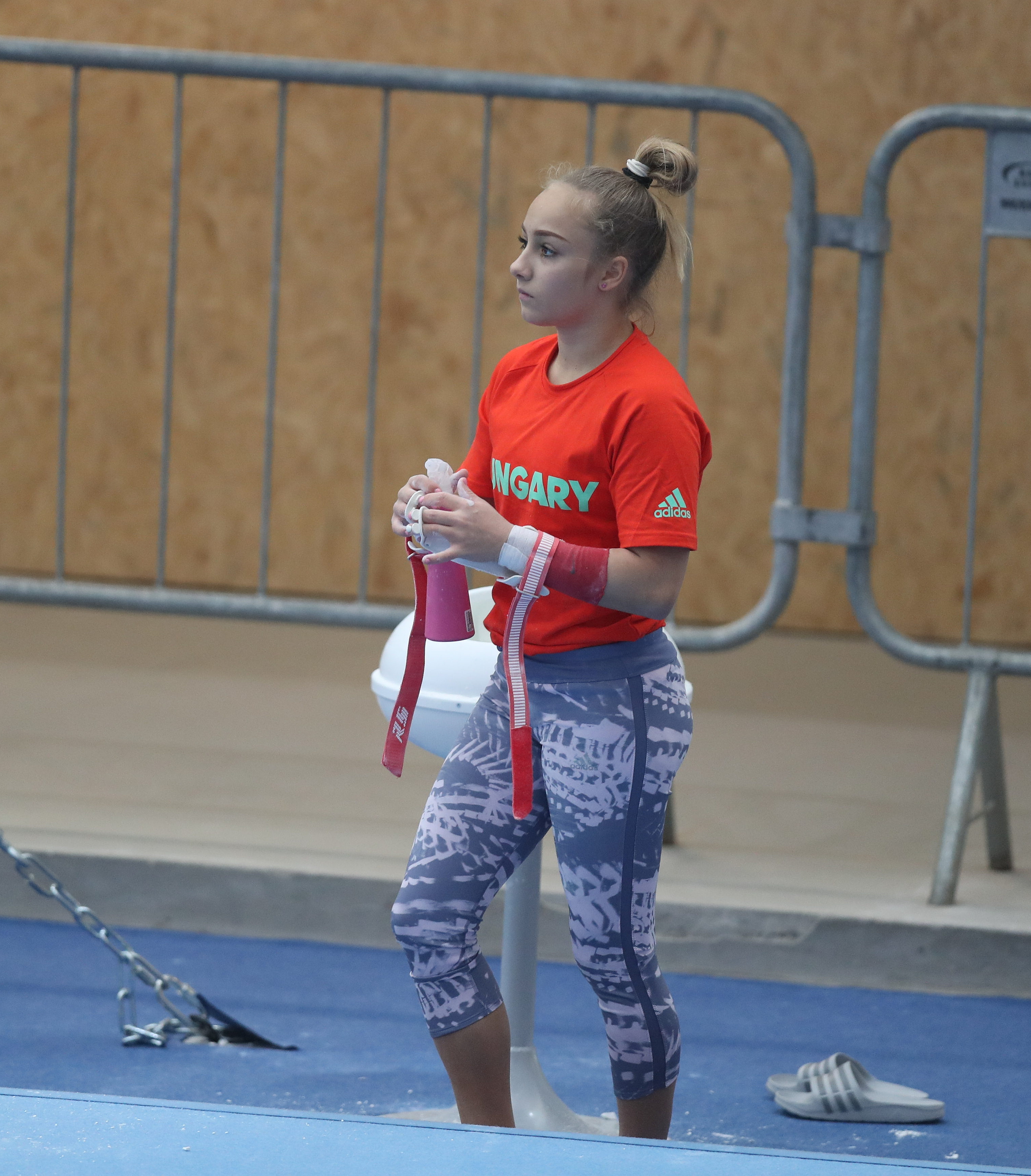
Training

Básckay at the 2018 Youth Olympics

After the Youth Olympics, Bácskay helped Hungary win a friendly meet against by United States, and she placed fourth in the all-around. Her final meet of the season was the Hungarian Masters Championships where she won the bronze medal on vault behind Dorina Böczögő and Sára Péter.

== Senior gymnastics career ==
=== 2019 ===
Bácskay turned senior in 2019. She competed at the Hungarian National League Championships in March where she placed first on vault, fourth on uneven bars and floor exercise, and ninth on balance beam. Bácskay made her international debut at the Doha World Cup where she finished 20th in vault qualification, 12th in balance beam qualification, and 23rd in floor exercise qualification. At the Elek Matolay Memorial, she tied with Dorina Böczögő for fourth place in the all-around. In the event finals, she won bronze medals on the vault and balance beam. In April, she competed at the European Championships. During qualifications, she placed tenth on vault, becoming the second reserve for the final. In September, she competed at the Szombathely World Cup where she qualified for the vault final where she placed seventh. She then competed at the 2nd Heerenveen Friendly where the Hungarian team placed fourth. She ended the season at the Hungarian Master Championships, finishing fourth on vault, fifth in the all-around, and sixth on uneven bars and balance beam.

=== 2020 ===
While most competitions were canceled or postponed due to the COVID-19 pandemic, the Szombathely Challenge Cup was held in October which Bácskay competed. She qualified for the vault, uneven bars, and balance beam finals. She finished sixth in the vault event final, eighth on uneven bars, and fourth on balance beam. Then at the Hungarian Championships, she won the silver medal on the vault behind Zsófia Kovács. She then won gold on vault at the Hungarian Master Championships. In December, Bácskay competed at the European Championships. During qualifications, she helped Hungary qualify third for the team final, and individually she qualified for the vault final. In the team final, Hungary won the bronze medal behind Ukraine and Romania. During the vault event final, she finished in fourth place.

=== 2021 ===
In April, Bácskay competed at the European Championships where she qualified for the all-around and vault finals. She finished 17th in the all-around final and sixth on vault. The following week, Bácskay announced that she had verbally committed to compete for the Nebraska Cornhuskers gymnastics team. She competed at the Cairo World Challenge Cup where she won the bronze medal on vault behind Nancy Taman and Bianka Schermann. Additionally, she finished fourth on the uneven bars and sixth on the balance beam. She then competed at the Osijek World Challenge Cup where she successfully competed a Yurchenko 1.5 twist and Tsukahara layout full to win the vault title. At the Koper World Challenge Cup she won silver on vault and at the Mersin Challenge Cup she won gold on vault and bronze on balance beam. Counting two wins and one second-place finish, Bácskay won the 2020–21 World Challenge Cup series title on vault, finishing five points ahead of Tjaša Kysselef.

In October, Bácskay competed at the 2021 World Championships. She was initially the first reserve for the all-around final, but she was called up to compete after Hitomi Hatakeda withdrew due to injury. During the all-around final she finished in 21st place, and during the vault final she placed fifth. In November, Bácskay signed her National Letter of Intent to compete for the Nebraska Cornhuskers.

=== 2022 ===
Bácskay started her season at the Doha World Cup, where she won the silver medal on the vault behind Oksana Chusovitina and placed eighth on the balance beam. She also took the silver on vault behind Chusovitina at the Baku World Cup. At the Elek Matolay Memorial, she won the gold medal on vault. She then won the bronze medal on vault at the Hungarian Championships. At the European Championships in Munich, she helped Hungary qualify for the team final, where they finished seventh. She was also the first reserve for the vault final. Then at the World Championships, she helped the Hungarian team finish 14th in the qualification round.

=== 2023 ===
Bácskay competed at the World Challenge Cups in Tel-Aviv and Osijek, winning silver on vault at each. In October, she competed at the World Championships where she helped the Hungarian team finish 15th in qualifications. Individually, Bácskay was originally the second reserve for the vault final. She was called up to compete once original qualifiers Joscelyn Roberson and Jessica Gadirova withdrew. During the final, she placed eighth. By being the top placed vault finalist not part of a qualified team or already qualified as an individual, Bácskay earned an individual berth to compete at the 2024 Olympic Games in Paris.

=== 2024 ===
Bácskay competed at the 2024 Olympic Games. During qualifications she only competed on vault; she finished twelfth and was the third reserve for the vault final.

== Personal life ==
In 2022, Bácskay began studying business administration at the University of Nebraska–Lincoln and competing for the Nebraska Cornhuskers gymnastics team. During the summer of 2024 she transferred to the University of Georgia.

== Collegiate gymnastics career ==
=== Regular season ranking ===
Season	All-around	Vault	Uneven bars	Balance beam	Floor exercise
2024	68th	185th	187th	243rd	97th
2026	N/A	N/A	82nd	N/A	N/A

== Competitive history ==
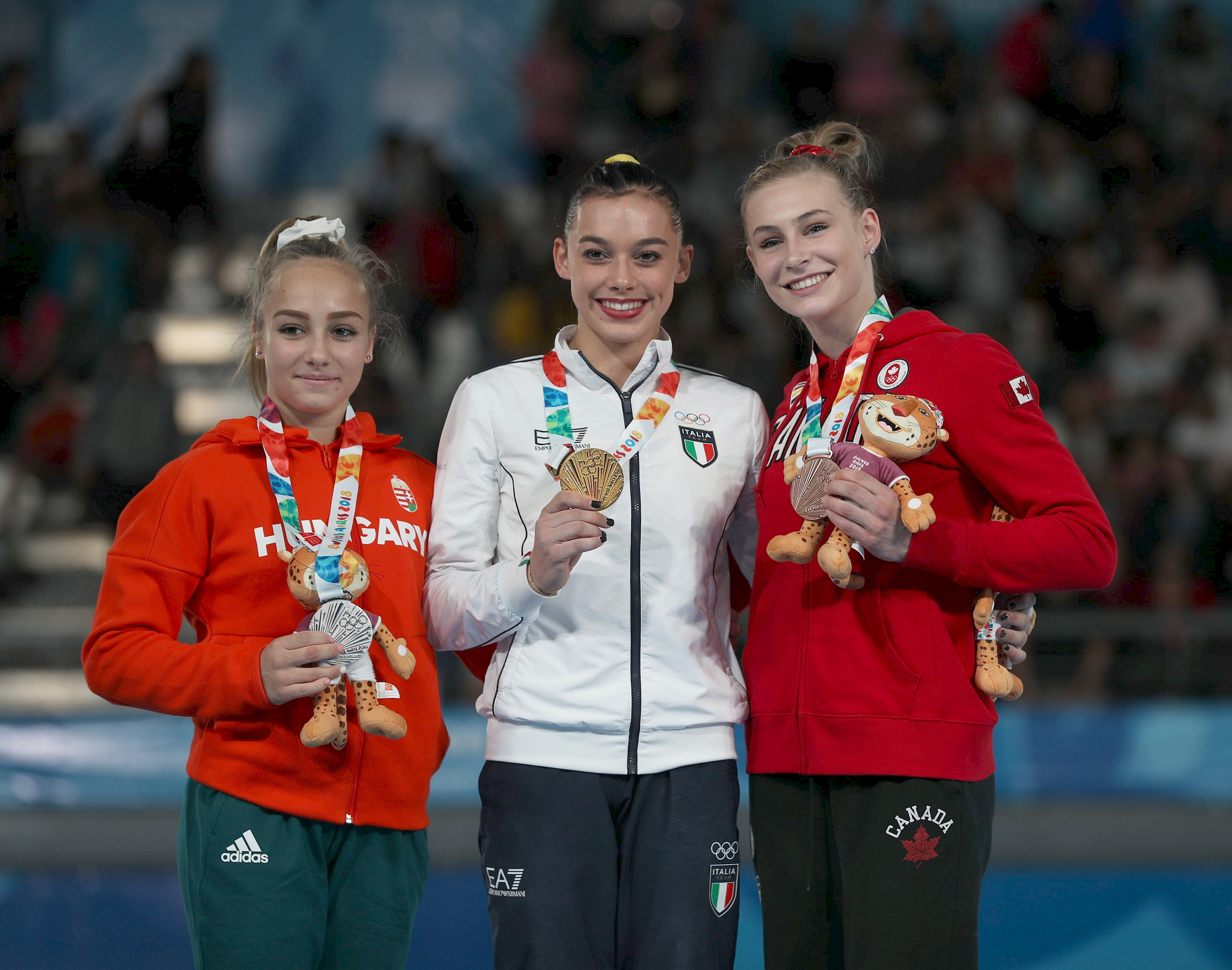
Bácskay (left) at the 2018 Youth Olympic Games

Competitive history of Csenge Bácskay at the junior level
Year	Event	Team	AA	VT	UB	BB	FX
2013	KSI Matsz Cup		7				
2014	Gym Festival Trnava	4	8				
2016	Olympic Hopes Cup		19			8	
2016	Eva Kanyo Cup		4	2nd place, silver medalist(s)	1st place, gold medalist(s)	3rd place, bronze medalist(s)	3rd place, bronze medalist(s)
2016	Győr Trophy		8	7	6	7	
2017	Elek Matolay Memorial		1st place, gold medalist(s)	2nd place, silver medalist(s)	4	1st place, gold medalist(s)	1st place, gold medalist(s)
2017	International GymSport		5	1st place, gold medalist(s)			2nd place, silver medalist(s)
2017	Gym Festival Trnava		6	2nd place, silver medalist(s)			3rd place, bronze medalist(s)
2017	Slovakian Junior Friendly	1st place, gold medalist(s)					
2017	European Youth Olympic Festival	4		8			4
2017	Olympic Hopes Cup		18				
2017	Hungarian Master Championships		11	2nd place, silver medalist(s)			6
2018	Gymnasiade	1st place, gold medalist(s)	7	2nd place, silver medalist(s)	7	7	
2018	Youth Olympic Qualifier		8				
2018	Budapest Friendly	1st place, gold medalist(s)	4				
2018	Hungarian Event Championships			1st place, gold medalist(s)	2nd place, silver medalist(s)	3rd place, bronze medalist(s)	1st place, gold medalist(s)
2018	European Championships	9	24	6			
2018	Youth Olympic Games		14	2nd place, silver medalist(s)			
2018	Győr Friendly		4				
2018	Hungarian Masters Championships		6	3rd place, bronze medalist(s)		4	

Competitive history of Csenge Bácskay at the senior level
Year	Event	Team	AA	VT	UB	BB	FX
2019	National League Championships			1st place, gold medalist(s)	4	9	4
2019	Elek Matolay Memorial		4	3rd place, bronze medalist(s)	6	3rd place, bronze medalist(s)	4
2019	European Championships			R2			
2019	Szombathely World Challenge Cup			7			
2019	2nd Heerenveen Friendly	4	18				
2019	Hungarian Master Championships		5	4	6	6	
2020	Szombathely World Challenge Cup			6	8	4	
2020	Hungarian Championships		5	2nd place, silver medalist(s)	5		5
2020	Hungarian Master Championships	3rd place, bronze medalist(s)	6	1st place, gold medalist(s)	6		6
2020	European Championships	3rd place, bronze medalist(s)		4			
2021	Super Team Championships	2nd place, silver medalist(s)	6				
2021	Hungarian Event Championships			1st place, gold medalist(s)	3rd place, bronze medalist(s)	6	6
2021	European Championships		17	6			
2021	Cairo World Challenge Cup			3rd place, bronze medalist(s)	4	6	
2021	Osijek World Challenge Cup			1st place, gold medalist(s)			
2021	FIT Challenge	9		1st place, gold medalist(s)			
2021	Koper World Challenge Cup			2nd place, silver medalist(s)			
2021	Mersin World Challenge Cup			1st place, gold medalist(s)		3rd place, bronze medalist(s)	
2021	Hungarian Grand Prix			1st place, gold medalist(s)			2nd place, silver medalist(s)
2021	Hungarian Championships		3rd place, bronze medalist(s)	1st place, gold medalist(s)	4	2nd place, silver medalist(s)	4
2021	World Championships		21	5			
2021	Hungarian Masters Championships	1st place, gold medalist(s)	5	1st place, gold medalist(s)	4	6	
2022	Doha World Cup			2nd place, silver medalist(s)		8	
2022	Cairo World Cup			6			
2022	Baku World Cup			2nd place, silver medalist(s)			
2022	Elek Matolay Memorial			1st place, gold medalist(s)			
2022	Osijek World Challenge Cup			4			
2022	Hungarian Championships			3rd place, bronze medalist(s)	5		
2022	European Championships	7		R1			
2022	World Championships	14					
2023	Tel Aviv World Challenge Cup			2nd place, silver medalist(s)	7		
2023	Osijek World Challenge Cup			2nd place, silver medalist(s)	6		
2023	World Championships	15		8			
2024	RomGym Trophy			3rd place, bronze medalist(s)			
2024	Olympic Games			R3			
2026
2026	European Championships	14		8			

Competitive history of Csenge Bácskay at the NCAA level
Year	Event	Team	AA	VT	UB	BB	FX
2026	SEC Championships	5					
2026	NCAA Championships	6		28	35		37
