= Gymnastics at the 2018 Summer Gymnasiade =

Gymnasiade
- Venue: Pole Citoyen Mhamid
- Location: Marrakesh, Morocco
- Date: May 2–9, 2018

The gymnastics competition at the 2018 Gymnasiade was held from May 2–9 in Marrakesh, Morocco.

== Medal winners ==
Event	Gold	Silver	Bronze
Men
Team			
All-around	Diogo Soares (BRA)	Nazar Chepurnyi (UKR)	Murilo Pontedura (BRA)
Floor exercise	Yeh Cheng (TPE)	Mathyas Condule (FRA)	Pau Jimenez (ESP)
Pommel horse	Leo Saladino (FRA)	Diogo Soares (BRA)	Murilo Pontedura (BRA)
Still rings	Franco Elian (ESP)	Mathyas Condule (FRA)	Nazar Chepurnyi (UKR)
Vault	Diogo Soares (BRA)	Pau Jimenez (ESP)	Yeh Cheng (TPE)
Parallel bars	Diogo Soares (BRA)	Mathyas Condule (FRA)	Georgios Kelesidis (GRE)
Horizontal bar	Nazar Chepurnyi (UKR)	Mateus Camilo (BRA) Mathyas Condule (FRA)	—N/a
Women
Team	Hungary; Nora Feher; Sára Péter; Csenge Bácskay; Bianka Schermann; Zoja Szekely	Ukraine; Anastasia Bachynska; Tetiana Mokliak; Daria Murzhak; Kateryna Kulinii	France; Blanche Beziaud; Sheyen Petit; Alison Faure; Alisson Lapp; Eva Meder
All-around	Anastasia Bachynska (UKR)	Nora Feher (HUN)	Tetiana Mokliak (UKR)
Vault	Anastasia Bachynska (UKR)	Csenge Bácskay (HUN)	Sára Péter (HUN)
Uneven bars	Kateryna Kulinii (UKR)	Zoja Szekely (HUN)	Tetiana Mokliak (UKR) Alison Faure (FRA)
Balance beam	Anastasia Bachynska (UKR)	Alisson Lapp (FRA)	Lai Chin (TPE) Silviana Sfiringu (ROU)
Floor exercise	Luiza Domingues (BRA)	Tetiana Mokliak (UKR)	Bianka Schermann (HUN) Lorena Medina (ESP) Silviana Sfiringu (ROU)

== See also ==
- Gymnastics at the 2013 Gymnasiade
- Gymnastics at the 2022 Gymnasiade
