= 2021 European Artistic Gymnastics Championships =

9th European Men's and Women's Artistic Gymnastics Individual Championships
- Venue: St. Jakobshalle
- Location: Basel, Switzerland
- Start date: 21 April 2021
- End date: 25 April 2021

The 9th European Men's and Women's Artistic Gymnastics Individual Championships were held from 21–25 April 2021 at St. Jakobshalle in Basel, Switzerland. The 2021 European Championships were an Olympic qualifying event, with two individual spots available for both disciplines. Russia earned a non-nominative quota spot in both disciplines, while Turkey's Adem Asil and Romania's Larisa Iordache qualified nominative berths for themselves in men's and women's artistic gymnastics, respectively.

The original qualifiers, the 2020 European Men's and 2020 European Women's Championships, were undesignated as such in light of the COVID-19 pandemic in Europe.

Several members of the German women's team chose to compete in full body leotards – a move that, while always allowed, has been considered risky and/or controversial in the past – to make the gymnasts more comfortable while competing, as well as address and deter sexualization of the sport.

== Schedule ==
All times in local time (UTC+02:00).

Wednesday, 21 April 2021

- 10:00 – 20:30 WAG Qualifying

Thursday, 22 April 2021

- 10:00 – 19:40 MAG Qualifying

Friday, 23 April 2021

- 13:30 – 15:30 WAG All-Around Final
- 17:15 – 20:00 MAG All-Around Final

Saturday, 24 April 2021

- 13:30 – 16:10 Apparatus Finals Day 1

Sunday, 25 April 2021

- 13:00 – 15:40 Apparatus Finals Day 2

== Medals summary ==
=== Medalists ===
Event	Gold	Silver	Bronze
Men
All-around	(Russia) Nikita Nagornyy	(Russia) David Belyavskiy	(Ukraine) Illia Kovtun
Floor	(Russia) Nikita Nagornyy	(Switzerland) Benjamin Gischard	(Italy) Nicola Bartolini
Pommel horse	(Armenia) Artur Davtyan	(Russia) Nikita Nagornyy	(United Kingdom) Joe Fraser
Rings	(Greece) Eleftherios Petrounias	(Russia) Nikita Nagornyy	(Italy) Salvatore Maresca
Vault	(Ukraine) Igor Radivilov	(Israel) Andrey Medvedev	(United Kingdom) Giarnni Regini-Moran
Parallel bars	(Turkey) Ferhat Arıcan	(Russia) David Belyavskiy	(Switzerland) Christian Baumann
Parallel bars	(Turkey) Ferhat Arıcan	(Russia) David Belyavskiy	(Germany) Lukas Dauser
Horizontal bar	(Russia) David Belyavskiy	(Germany) Andreas Toba	(Turkey) Adem Asil
Women
All-around	(Russia) Viktoria Listunova	(Russia) Angelina Melnikova	(United Kingdom) Jessica Gadirova
Vault	(Switzerland) Giulia Steingruber	(United Kingdom) Jessica Gadirova	(Russia) Angelina Melnikova
Uneven bars	(Russia) Angelina Melnikova	(Russia) Vladislava Urazova	(United Kingdom) Amelie Morgan
Balance beam	(France) Mélanie de Jesus dos Santos	(Netherlands) Sanne Wevers	(Ukraine) Anastasiia Bachynska
Floor	(United Kingdom) Jessica Gadirova	(Russia) Angelina Melnikova	(Italy) Vanessa Ferrari

=== Medal standings ===
==== Overall ====
* Host nation (Switzerland)

Rank	Nation	Gold	Silver	Bronze	Total
1	Russia	5	7	1	13
2	Great Britain	1	1	4	6
3	Switzerland*	1	1	1	3
4	Ukraine	1	0	2	3
5	Turkey	1	0	1	2
6	Armenia	1	0	0	1
6	France	1	0	0	1
6	Greece	1	0	0	1
9	Germany	0	1	1	2
10	Israel	0	1	0	1
10	Netherlands	0	1	0	1
12	Italy	0	0	3	3
Totals (12 entries)		12	12	13	37

==== Men ====
* Host nation (Switzerland)

Rank	Nation	Gold	Silver	Bronze	Total
1	Russia	3	4	0	7
2	Turkey	1	0	1	2
2	Ukraine	1	0	1	2
4	Armenia	1	0	0	1
4	Greece	1	0	0	1
6	Germany	0	1	1	2
6	Switzerland*	0	1	1	2
8	Israel	0	1	0	1
9	Great Britain	0	0	2	2
9	Italy	0	0	2	2
Totals (10 entries)		7	7	8	22

==== Women ====
* Host nation (Switzerland)

Rank	Nation	Gold	Silver	Bronze	Total
1	Russia	2	3	1	6
2	Great Britain	1	1	2	4
3	France	1	0	0	1
3	Switzerland*	1	0	0	1
5	Netherlands	0	1	0	1
6	Italy	0	0	1	1
6	Ukraine	0	0	1	1
Totals (7 entries)		5	5	5	15

== Men's results ==
=== Individual all-around ===
Oldest and youngest competitors

	Name	Country	Date of birth	Age
Youngest	Illia Kovtun	Ukraine	10 August 2003	17 years, 8 months and 13 days
Oldest	David Belyavskiy	Russia	23 February 1992	29 years and 2 months

Rank	Gymnast	Floor (gymnastics)	Pommel horse	Rings (gymnastics)	Vault (gymnastics)	Parallel bars	Horizontal bar	Total
1st place, gold medalist(s)	(Russia) Nikita Nagornyy	14.933	14.133	14.466	15.000	15.000	14.500	88.032
2nd place, silver medalist(s)	(Russia) David Belyavskiy	14.400	14.933	13.266	14.166	15.366	13.733	85.864
3rd place, bronze medalist(s)	(Ukraine) Illia Kovtun	14.166	14.733	13.233	13.966	14.900	13.866	84.864
4	(Turkey) Ahmet Önder	14.600	13.666	14.300	13.700	14.666	12.666	83.598
5	(Switzerland) Pablo Brägger	14.200	12.266	13.100	14.000	14.566	14.133	82.265
6	(Lithuania) Robert Tvorogal	14.133	13.233	13.366	14.033	14.433	12.933	82.131
7	(Ukraine) Volodymyr Kostiuk	13.533	13.233	13.400	14.300	14.000	13.066	81.532
8	(Azerbaijan) Ivan Tikhonov	12.666	13.933	13.900	13.233	13.766	13.100	80.598
9	(Italy) Nicola Bartolini	14.500	11.900	12.633	14.466	13.866	12.966	80.331
10	(United Kingdom) Jake Jarman	14.266	13.100	12.666	14.733	13.866	11.600	80.231
11	(Italy) Stefano Patron	14.000	13.433	13.133	13.833	14.533	10.866	79.798
12	(United Kingdom) Joshua Nathan	13.733	12.733	12.600	14.000	13.933	12.766	79.765
13	(Sweden) David Rumbutis	13.300	12.933	12.233	14.425	13.700	12.866	79.457
14	(Cyprus) Ilias Georgiou	11.466	12.766	13.300	13.766	14.100	13.733	79.131
15	(Belgium) Luka Van den Keybus	14.033	11.100	12.766	13.833	13.900	13.433	79.065
16	(Finland) Elias Koski	13.700	13.200	13.166	13.666	11.633	13.100	78.465
17	(Germany) Lukas Dauser	13.733	13.166	13.433	11.733	13.900	12.100	78.065
18	(Czech Republic) David Jessen	13.675	12.466	12.500	13.500	12.800	12.800	77.741
19	(Greece) Antonios Tantalidis	12.866	11.600	12.533	14.600	13.100	12.466	77.165
20	(Hungary) Krisztián Balázs	9.766	12.700	13.200	13.633	13.400	14.266	76.965
21	(Republic of Ireland) Adam Steele	13.733	12.566	12.266	12.766	12.333	13.066	76.730
22	(Germany) Felix Remuta	14.033	9.683	12.100	14.600	12.966	11.633	75.015
23	(Switzerland) Christian Baumann	12.766	12.766	13.700	0.000	14.933	13.966	68.131
WD	(Turkey) Adem Asil	14.000	12.566	–	–	–	–	DNF

- Casimir Schmidt of the Netherlands withdrew, citing mental and physical exhaustion. The starting groups were not re-seeded, and first reserve Krisztián Balázs of Hungary replaced Schmidt, who had the 12th-highest qualifying score, in the second rotation group.
- Yahor Sharamkou of Belarus withdrew. He was replaced in the fourth rotation group by second reserve Antonios Tantalidis of Greece.
- Adem Asil of Turkey withdrew after the second rotation due to a shoulder injury; he was still able to compete in event finals later in the week.

=== Floor ===
Oldest and youngest competitors

	Name	Country	Date of birth	Age
Youngest	Yahor Sharamkou	Belarus	4 March 1999	22 years, 1 month and 20 days
Oldest	Kirill Prokopev	Russia	30 January 1994	27 years, 2 months and 25 days

Position	Gymnast	D Score	E Score	Penalty	Total
1st place, gold medalist(s)	(Russia) Nikita Nagornyy	6.8	8.366		15.166
2nd place, silver medalist(s)	(Switzerland) Benjamin Gischard	6.0	8.966		14.966
3rd place, bronze medalist(s)	(Italy) Nicola Bartolini	5.8	8.866		14.666
4	(Turkey) Ahmet Önder	6.0	8.166		14.166
5	(Belarus) Yahor Sharamkou	6.3	7.966	0.300	13.966
6	(Turkey) Adem Asil	6.0	7.966		13.966
7	(Bulgaria) Dimitar Dimitrov	6.0	7.900		13.900
8	(Russia) Kirill Prokopev	6.1	7.366		13.466

=== Pommel horse ===
Oldest and youngest competitors

	Name	Country	Date of birth	Age
Youngest	Illia Kovtun	Ukraine	10 August 2003	17 years, 8 months and 14 days
Oldest	David Belyavskiy	Russia	23 February 1992	29 years, 2 months and 1 day

Position	Gymnast	D Score	E Score	Penalty	Total
1st place, gold medalist(s)	(Armenia) Artur Davtyan	5.8	8.466		14.266
2nd place, silver medalist(s)	(Russia) Nikita Nagornyy	6.1	8.166		14.266
3rd place, bronze medalist(s)	(United Kingdom) Joe Fraser	5.9	8.166		14.066
4	(Armenia) Gagik Khachikyan	6.3	7.733		14.033
5	(Republic of Ireland) Rhys McClenaghan	6.0	7.566		13.566
6	(Russia) David Belyavskiy	6.1	7.066		13.166
7	(United Kingdom) Joshua Nathan	6.9	6.133		13.033
8	(Ukraine) Illia Kovtun	5.9	7.066		12.966

=== Rings ===
Oldest and youngest competitors

	Name	Country	Date of birth	Age
Youngest	Artur Avetisyan	Armenia	1 January 1998	23 years, 3 months and 23 days
Oldest	Vahagn Davtyan	Armenia	19 August 1988	32 years, 8 months and 5 days

Position	Gymnast	D Score	E Score	Penalty	Total
1st place, gold medalist(s)	(Greece) Eleftherios Petrounias	6.3	9.100		15.400
2nd place, silver medalist(s)	(Russia) Nikita Nagornyy	6.1	8.933		15.033
3rd place, bronze medalist(s)	(Italy) Salvatore Maresca	6.2	8.700		14.900
4	(Armenia) Artur Avetisyan	5.9	8.966		14.866
5	(Turkey) İbrahim Çolak	6.0	8.733		14.733
6	(Ukraine) Igor Radivilov	6.0	8.666		14.666
7	(Austria) Vinzenz Höck	6.1	8.566		14.666
8	(Armenia) Vahagn Davtyan	6.0	8.658		14.658

=== Vault ===
Oldest and youngest competitors

	Name	Country	Date of birth	Age
Youngest	Yahor Sharamkou	Belarus	4 March 1999	22 years, 1 month and 21 days
Oldest	Andrey Medvedev	Israel	6 April 1990	31 years and 19 days

Position	Gymnast	Vault 1				Vault 2				Total
Position	Gymnast	D Score	E Score	Pen.	Score 1	D Score	E Score	Pen.	Score 2	Total
1st place, gold medalist(s)	(Ukraine) Igor Radivilov	6.0	9.000		15.000	5.6	8.833		14.433	14.716
2nd place, silver medalist(s)	(Israel) Andrey Medvedev	5.6	9.033		14.633	5.6	9.166		14.683	14.658
3rd place, bronze medalist(s)	(United Kingdom) Giarnni Regini-Moran	5.6	9.166		14.766	5.6	8.800		14.400	14.583
4	(Belarus) Yahor Sharamkou	5.2	9.233		14.433	5.6	9.066		14.666	14.549
5	(United Kingdom) Courtney Tulloch	5.6	9.133		14.733	5.6	8.700		14.300	14.516
6	(Armenia) Artur Davtyan	5.6	8.666	0.100	14.166	5.6	9.233		14.833	14.499
7	(Russia) Nikita Nagornyy	5.6	9.000		14.600	5.6	7.866		13.466	14.033
8	(France) Loris Frasca	5.6	9.100		14.700	5.6	7.833	0.100	13.333	14.016

=== Parallel bars ===
Oldest and youngest competitors

	Name	Country	Date of birth	Age
Youngest	Illia Kovtun	Ukraine	10 August 2003	17 years, 8 months and 15 days
Oldest	David Belyavskiy	Russia	23 February 1992	29 years, 2 months and 2 days

Position	Gymnast	D Score	E Score	Penalty	Total
1st place, gold medalist(s)	(Turkey) Ferhat Arıcan	6.6	8.700		15.300
2nd place, silver medalist(s)	(Russia) David Belyavskiy	6.5	8.633		15.133
3rd place, bronze medalist(s)	(Switzerland) Christian Baumann	6.4	8.700		15.100
3rd place, bronze medalist(s)	(Germany) Lukas Dauser	6.4	8.700		15.100
5	(Ukraine) Illia Kovtun	6.3	8.633		14.933
6	(Russia) Nikita Nagornyy	6.1	8.566		14.666
7	(Switzerland) Pablo Brägger	6.2	8.400		14.600
8	(Turkey) Ahmet Önder	4.4	5.266		9.666

=== Horizontal bar ===
Oldest and youngest competitors

	Name	Country	Date of birth	Age
Youngest	Krisztián Balázs	Hungary	25 March 2002	19 years and 1 month
Oldest	Andreas Toba	Germany	7 October 1990	30 years, 6 months and 18 days

Position	Gymnast	D Score	E Score	Penalty	Total
1st place, gold medalist(s)	(Russia) David Belyavskiy	5.6	8.466		14.066
2nd place, silver medalist(s)	(Germany) Andreas Toba	6.2	7.633		13.833
3rd place, bronze medalist(s)	(Turkey) Adem Asil	5.9	7.866		13.766
4	(Italy) Carlo Macchini	6.0	7.600		13.600
5	(Turkey) Ahmet Önder	5.0	8.466		13.466
6	(Switzerland) Christian Baumann	5.9	7.566		13.466
7	(Switzerland) Pablo Brägger	6.4	6.933		13.333
8	(Hungary) Krisztián Balázs	5.6	7.000		12.600

== Women's results ==
=== Individual all-around ===
Oldest and youngest competitors

	Name	Country	Date of birth	Age
Youngest	Jutta Verkest	Belgium	11 October 2005	15 years, 6 months and 12 days
Oldest	Marta Pihan-Kulesza	Poland	23 July 1987	33 years and 9 months

Rank	Gymnast	Vault (gymnastics)	Uneven bars	Balance beam	Floor (gymnastics)	Total
1st place, gold medalist(s)	(Russia) Viktoria Listunova	14.466	14.333	14.066	13.866	56.731
2nd place, silver medalist(s)	(Russia) Angelina Melnikova	14.733	13.733	12.833	14.133	55.432
3rd place, bronze medalist(s)	(United Kingdom) Jessica Gadirova	14.600	13.300	13.500	13.700	55.100
4	(United Kingdom) Amelie Morgan	13.633	13.733	13.433	12.766	53.565
5	(Germany) Elisabeth Seitz	13.566	14.033	12.933	12.866	53.398
6	(Italy) Martina Maggio	14.233	11.800	13.400	12.933	52.366
7	(Germany) Kim Bui	13.566	13.933	11.766	13.033	52.298
8	(Netherlands) Lieke Wevers	13.566	13.300	12.866	12.533	52.265
9	(Netherlands) Naomi Visser	13.433	13.000	13.233	12.533	52.199
10	(Belgium) Jutta Verkest	13.500	12.466	13.500	12.666	52.132
11	(Portugal) Filipa Martins	13.533	14.225	11.566	12.433	51.757
12	(France) Carolann Héduit	13.866	13.266	11.700	12.833	51.665
13	(Finland) Maisa Kuusikko	13.866	13.000	12.500	11.900	51.266
14	(Sweden) Tonya Paulsson	13.658	12.900	12.400	12.000	50.958
15	(France) Sheyen Petit	13.266	11.700	13.133	12.666	50.765
16	(Hungary) Zója Székely	13.200	13.066	11.966	12.400	50.632
17	(Hungary) Csenge Bácskay	13.900	12.733	11.466	11.900	49.999
18	(Slovakia) Barbora Mokošová	13.266	13.200	11.600	11.933	49.999
19	(Republic of Ireland) Emma Slevin	13.233	12.400	11.900	12.300	49.833
20	(Ukraine) Anastasiia Bachynska	12.466	12.500	12.066	12.666	49.698
21	(Finland) Ada Hautala	13.533	11.333	11.300	11.666	47.832
22	(Israel) Lihie Raz	13.400	10.666	11.533	11.900	47.499
23	(Latvia) Elīna Vihrova	13.466	12.433	10.566	10.933	47.398
WD	(Poland) Marta Pihan-Kulesza	–	–	–	5.166	DNF

- Vanessa Ferrari of Italy withdrew to focus on the floor final. She was replaced by first reserve Naomi Visser of the Netherlands, rather than teammate Alice D'Amato who originally did not qualify due to the two-per-country rule. The starting groups were not re-seeded and Visser replaced Ferrari, who had the sixth-highest qualifying score, in the first rotation group.
- Marine Boyer of France withdrew to focus on the beam final. She was replaced in the third rotation group by teammate Sheyen Petit, who had been two-per-country'd out of the final.
- Larisa Iordache of Romania withdrew due to a kidney infection requiring hospitalization. She was replaced in the first rotation group by second reserve Zója Székely of Hungary.
- Giulia Steingruber of Switzerland withdrew to focus on event finals. She was replaced in the second rotation group by third reserve Jutta Verkest of Belgium.
- Marta Pihan-Kulesza of Poland suffered an ACL injury on floor during the first rotation and subsequently withdrew.

=== Vault ===
Oldest and youngest competitors

	Name	Country	Date of birth	Age
Youngest	Anastasiia Motak	Ukraine	12 November 2004	16 years, 5 months and 12 days
Oldest	Tjaša Kysselef	Slovenia	27 April 1993	27 years, 11 months and 28 days

Position	Gymnast	Vault 1				Vault 2				Total
Position	Gymnast	D Score	E Score	Pen.	Score 1	D Score	E Score	Pen.	Score 2	Total
1st place, gold medalist(s)	(Switzerland) Giulia Steingruber	5.8	9.266		15.066	5.4	9.183		14.583	14.824
2nd place, silver medalist(s)	(United Kingdom) Jessica Gadirova	5.4	9.200		14.600	5.2	9.133		14.333	14.466
3rd place, bronze medalist(s)	(Russia) Angelina Melnikova	5.4	9.200		14.600	5.2	9.033		14.233	14.416
4	(Ukraine) Anastasiia Motak	5.4	8.633	0.100	13.933	4.8	8.666		13.466	13.699
5	(Slovenia) Tjaša Kysselef	5.0	8.700		13.700	4.8	8.833		13.633	13.666
6	(Hungary) Csenge Bácskay	5.0	8.766		13.766	4.8	8.733		13.533	13.649
7	(Azerbaijan) Marina Nekrasova	5.0	7.533	0.100	12.433	5.2	8.733		13.933	13.183
8	(Hungary) Sára Péter	5.4	7.566		12.966	0.0	0.000		0.000	6.483

=== Uneven bars ===
Oldest and youngest competitors

	Name	Country	Date of birth	Age
Youngest	Vladislava Urazova	Russia	14 August 2004	16 years, 8 months and 10 days
Oldest	Elisabeth Seitz	Germany	4 November 1993	27 years, 5 months and 20 days

Position	Gymnast	D Score	E Score	Penalty	Total
1st place, gold medalist(s)	(Russia) Angelina Melnikova	6.2	8.300		14.500
2nd place, silver medalist(s)	(Russia) Vladislava Urazova	6.1	8.233		14.333
3rd place, bronze medalist(s)	(United Kingdom) Amelie Morgan	5.8	8.300		14.100
4	(Italy) Giorgia Villa	5.7	8.300		14.000
5	(Italy) Alice D'Amato	5.9	7.800		13.700
6	(Sweden) Jonna Adlerteg	6.0	7.666		13.666
7	(Germany) Elisabeth Seitz	6.0	7.033		13.033
8	(Portugal) Filipa Martins	5.8	5.533		11.333

=== Balance beam ===
Oldest and youngest competitors

	Name	Country	Date of birth	Age
Youngest	Anastasiia Bachynska	Ukraine	4 August 2003	17 years, 8 months and 21 days
Oldest	Lieke Wevers	Netherlands	17 September 1991	29 years, 7 months and 8 days
Oldest	Sanne Wevers	Netherlands	17 September 1991	29 years, 7 months and 8 days

Position	Gymnast	D Score	E Score	Penalty	Total
1st place, gold medalist(s)	(France) Mélanie de Jesus dos Santos	6.0	7.900		13.900
2nd place, silver medalist(s)	(Netherlands) Sanne Wevers	5.6	8.266		13.866
3rd place, bronze medalist(s)	(Ukraine) Anastasiia Bachynska	5.6	7.733		13.333
4	(United Kingdom) Amelie Morgan	5.3	7.866		13.166
5	(Italy) Martina Maggio	4.9	8.100		13.000
6	(France) Marine Boyer	5.3	7.566		12.866
7	(Netherlands) Lieke Wevers	5.1	7.200		12.300
8	(Latvia) Elīna Vihrova	4.6	6.600		11.200

- Larisa Iordache of Romania withdrew due to health issues after being hospitalized earlier in the week. She was to be replaced by first reserve Marta Pihan-Kulesza of Poland, but after Pihan-Kulesza suffered an injury during the all-around final, Iordache was instead replaced by second reserve Anastasiia Bachynska of Ukraine.

=== Floor ===
Oldest and youngest competitors

	Name	Country	Date of birth	Age
Youngest	Maria Ceplinschi	Romania	12 August 2005	15 years, 8 months and 13 days
Oldest	Kim Bui	Germany	20 January 1989	32 years, 3 months and 5 days

Position	Gymnast	D Score	E Score	Penalty	Total
1st place, gold medalist(s)	(United Kingdom) Jessica Gadirova	5.5	8.466		13.966
2nd place, silver medalist(s)	(Russia) Angelina Melnikova	5.9	8.000		13.900
3rd place, bronze medalist(s)	(Italy) Vanessa Ferrari	5.7	8.000		13.700
4	(Italy) Martina Maggio	5.3	7.966		13.266
5	(Romania) Maria Ceplinschi	5.2	7.866	0.100	12.966
6	(Germany) Kim Bui	5.1	7.800	0.300	12.900
7	(Russia) Viktoria Listunova	5.2	6.833		12.033
8	(France) Carolann Héduit	1.6	9.566	8.500	2.666

- Larisa Iordache of Romania withdrew due to health issues after being hospitalized earlier in the week. She was replaced by first reserve Maria Ceplinschi of Romania.
- Giulia Steingruber of Switzerland withdrew due to a left thigh injury shortly before the start of the competition. She was replaced by second reserve Carolann Héduit of France.
- Héduit suffered a knee injury during her routine and did not finish.

== Qualification ==
=== Men's results ===
==== Individual all-around ====
Russia earned a non-nominative quota spot, and Turkey's Adem Asil secured a nominative quota spot for the 2020 Summer Olympics.

Rank	Gymnast	Floor (gymnastics)	Pommel horse	Rings (gymnastics)	Vault (gymnastics)	Parallel bars	Horizontal bar	Total	Qual.
1	(Russia) Nikita Nagornyy	15.066	14.066	14.733	14.766	14.833	13.633	87.097	Q
2	(Russia) David Belyavskiy	13.733	14.133	14.400	14.533	14.866	13.733	85.398	Q
3	(Russia) Aleksandr Kartsev	14.233	13.733	14.066	14.433	14.708	13.558	84.731	–
4	(Turkey) Ahmet Önder	14.466	12.666	14.233	14.233	14.800	13.733	84.131	Q
5	(Turkey) Adem Asil	14.600	12.633	14.600	14.266	14.233	13.700	84.032	Q
6	(Switzerland) Pablo Brägger	13.566	13.266	13.300	13.600	14.833	14.100	82.665	Q
7	(Russia) Kirill Prokopev	15.066	12.933	13.866	14.300	13.433	13.066	82.664	–
8	(Italy) Nicola Bartolini	14.433	14.558	13.000	12.866	14.300	13.000	82.157	Q
9	(Lithuania) Robert Tvorogal	13.666	13.366	13.433	13.800	14.433	13.133	81.831	Q
10	(Azerbaijan) Ivan Tikhonov	13.400	13.166	14.200	14.200	13.833	12.633	81.432	Q
11	(Ukraine) Illia Kovtun	13.300	14.200	14.066	13.375	14.666	11.800	81.407	Q
12	(United Kingdom) Joshua Nathan	12.366	14.533	12.900	14.416	13.700	13.166	81.081	Q
13	(Italy) Stefano Patron	13.900	13.833	12.766	13.633	13.666	12.900	80.698	Q
14	(Italy) Lorenzo Minh Casali	13.866	11.700	13.500	14.366	14.466	12.466	80.364	–
15	(Netherlands) Casimir Schmidt	14.400	12.700	13.766	13.675	13.533	12.233	80.307	Q
16	(Czech Republic) David Jessen	13.600	13.566	12.766	13.700	13.391	13.266	80.289	Q
17	(Germany) Lukas Dauser	13.200	12.966	13.433	12.166	15.166	13.133	80.064	Q
18	(Finland) Elias Koski	13.800	13.466	13.316	13.883	12.766	12.800	80.031	Q
19	(Belgium) Luka Van den Keybus	13.800	11.800	13.233	13.866	14.000	13.100	79.799	Q
20	(Republic of Ireland) Adam Steele	13.566	13.333	12.700	14.366	12.900	12.866	79.731	Q
21	(Ukraine) Volodymyr Kostiuk	13.233	13.766	13.133	13.633	13.800	12.033	79.598	Q
22	(Cyprus) Ilias Georgiou	13.566	12.700	12.933	13.633	14.100	12.533	79.465	Q
23	(Germany) Felix Remuta	14.033	12.166	13.433	13.233	13.766	12.800	79.431	Q
24	(Switzerland) Christian Baumann	10.733	12.500	13.866	13.533	14.933	13.833	79.398	Q
25	(United Kingdom) Jake Jarman	13.500	13.066	12.866	13.700	13.866	12.400	79.398	Q
26	(Ukraine) Yevgen Yudenkov	13.366	11.866	14.133	13.833	13.600	11.933	78.731	–
27	(Sweden) David Rumbutis	12.633	12.533	13.200	14.433	13.400	12.366	78.565	Q
28	(Belarus) Yahor Sharamkou	14.566	12.800	12.833	14.333	11.466	12.233	78.231	Q
29	(Hungary) Krisztián Balázs	12.833	11.266	13.400	13.666	13.033	13.800	77.998	R1
30	(Greece) Antonios Tantalidis	14.266	12.033	12.733	14.400	13.000	11.525	77.957	R2
31	(Norway) Theodor Gadderud	13.733	12.066	12.933	13.900	13.333	11.933	77.898	R3

==== Floor ====
Rank	Gymnast	D Score	E Score	Pen.	Total	Qual.
1	(Russia) Kirill Prokopev	6.4	8.666		15.066	Q
2	(Russia) Nikita Nagornyy	6.6	8.566	0.100	15.066	Q
3	(Switzerland) Benjamin Gischard	6.0	8.666		14.666	Q
4	(Turkey) Adem Asil	6.0	8.600		14.600	Q
5	(Belarus) Yahor Sharamkou	6.5	8.066		14.566	Q
6	(Italy) Nicola Bartolini	5.8	8.758		14.558	Q
7	(Bulgaria) Dimitar Dimitrov	6.0	8.533		14.533	Q
8	(Turkey) Ahmet Önder	6.0	8.466		14.466	Q
9	(Netherlands) Casimir Schmidt	6.0	8.400		14.400	R1
10	(Finland) Emil Soravuo	6.0	8.300		14.300	R2
11	(Greece) Antonios Tantalidis	6.2	8.366	0.300	14.266	R3

==== Pommel horse ====
Rank	Gymnast	D Score	E Score	Pen.	Total	Qual.
1	(Republic of Ireland) Rhys McClenaghan	6.3	8.466		14.766	Q
2	(United Kingdom) Joshua Nathan	6.9	7.633		14.533	Q
3	(Armenia) Gagik Khachikyan	6.3	8.000		14.300	Q
4	(Armenia) Artur Davtyan	5.9	8.366		14.266	Q
5	(United Kingdom) Joe Fraser	6.3	7.866		14.166	Q
6	(Russia) David Belyavskiy	6.4	7.733		14.133	Q
7	(Russia) Nikita Nagornyy	6.1	7.966		14.066	Q
8	(Ukraine) Illia Kovtun	6.3	7.766		14.066	Q
9	(Netherlands) Loran de Munck	6.2	7.766		13.966	R1
10	(Austria) Xheni Dyrmishi	5.5	8.266		13.766	R2
11	(Russia) Aleksandr Kartsev	5.7	8.033		13.733	–
12	(Israel) Alexander Myakinin	5.8	7.866		13.666	R3

==== Rings ====
Rank	Gymnast	D Score	E Score	Pen.	Total	Qual.
1	(Greece) Eleftherios Petrounias	6.3	9.066		15.366	Q
2	(Armenia) Vahagn Davtyan	6.0	8.966		14.966	Q
3	(Italy) Salvatore Maresca	6.2	8.733		14.933	Q
4	(Armenia) Artur Avetisyan	5.9	8.933		14.833	Q
5	(Ukraine) Igor Radivilov	6.0	8.800		14.800	Q
6	(Austria) Vinzenz Höck	6.1	8.666		14.766	Q
7	(Turkey) İbrahim Çolak	6.0	8.733		14.733	Q
7	(Russia) Nikita Nagornyy	6.0	8.733		14.733	Q
9	(Turkey) Adem Asil	6.2	8.400		14.600	R1
10	(Germany) Nick Klessing	6.1	8.400		14.500	R2
11	(Russia) David Belyavskiy	5.7	8.700		14.400	R3

==== Vault ====
Rank	Gymnast	Vault 1				Vault 2				Total	Qual.
Rank	Gymnast	D Score	E Score	Pen.	Score 1	D Score	E Score	Pen.	Score 2	Total	Qual.
1	(Israel) Andrey Medvedev	5.6	9.133		14.733	5.6	9.100	0.100	14.600	14.666	Q
2	(Russia) Nikita Nagornyy	5.6	9.166		14.766	5.6	8.800		14.400	14.583	Q
3	(United Kingdom) Giarnni Regini-Moran	5.6	9.066		14.666	5.6	8.900		14.500	14.583	Q
4	(Armenia) Artur Davtyan	5.6	9.200		14.800	5.6	8.833	0.100	14.333	14.566	Q
5	(France) Loris Frasca	5.6	9.000	0.100	14.500	5.6	9.000		14.600	14.550	Q
6	(United Kingdom) Courtney Tulloch	5.6	8.966		14.566	5.6	8.866		14.466	14.516	Q
7	(Belarus) Yahor Sharamkou	5.2	9.233	0.100	14.333	5.6	9.033		14.633	14.483	Q
8	(Ukraine) Igor Radivilov	5.6	9.033		14.633	5.6	8.833	0.100	14.333	14.483	Q
9	(Turkey) Adem Asil	5.6	8.666		14.266	5.6	9.000		14.600	14.433	R1
10	(Sweden) David Rumbutis	5.6	8.933	0.100	14.433	5.4	8.900		14.300	14.366	R2
11	(France) Leo Saladino	5.6	9.033	0.100	14.533	5.6	8.466		14.066	14.299	R3

==== Parallel bars ====
Rank	Gymnast	D Score	E Score	Pen.	Total	Qual.
1	(Germany) Lukas Dauser	6.4	8.766		15.166	Q
2	(Turkey) Ferhat Arıcan	6.6	8.533		15.133	Q
3	(Switzerland) Christian Baumann	6.4	8.533		14.933	Q
4	(Russia) David Belyavskiy	6.5	8.366		14.866	Q
5	(Russia) Nikita Nagornyy	6.1	8.733		14.833	Q
6	(Switzerland) Pablo Brägger	6.2	8.633		14.833	Q
7	(Turkey) Ahmet Önder	6.2	8.600		14.800	Q
8	(Switzerland) Marco Pfyl	6.2	8.566		14.766	–
9	(Russia) Aleksandr Kartsev	6.0	8.708		14.708	–
10	(Ukraine) Illia Kovtun	6.6	8.066		14.666	Q
11	(Romania) Andrei Muntean	5.8	8.725		14.525	R1
12	(Italy) Lorenzo Minh Casali	5.7	8.766		14.466	R2
13	(Lithuania) Robert Tvorogal	5.9	8.533		14.433	R3

==== Horizontal bar ====
Rank	Gymnast	D Score	E Score	Pen.	Total	Qual.
1	(Germany) Andreas Toba	6.3	8.133		14.433	Q
2	(Switzerland) Pablo Brägger	6.3	7.800		14.100	Q
3	(Italy) Carlo Macchini	6.1	7.966		14.066	Q
4	(Switzerland) Christian Baumann	5.8	8.033		13.833	Q
5	(Hungary) Krisztián Balázs	6.0	7.800		13.800	Q
6	(Switzerland) Marco Pfyl	6.0	7.766		13.766	–
7	(Russia) David Belyavskiy	5.6	8.133		13.733	Q
8	(Turkey) Ahmet Önder	6.0	7.733		13.733	Q
9	(Turkey) Adem Asil	5.9	7.800		13.700	Q
10	(Russia) Nikita Nagornyy	5.8	7.833		13.633	R1
11	(Netherlands) Bart Deurloo	6.0	7.600		13.600	R2
11	(Hungary) Dávid Vecsernyés	6.0	7.600		13.600	R2

=== Women's results ===
==== Individual all-around ====
Russia earned a non-nominative quota spot, and Romania's Larisa Iordache secured a nominative quota spot for the 2020 Summer Olympics.

Rank	Gymnast	Vault (gymnastics)	Uneven bars	Balance beam	Floor (gymnastics)	Total	Qual.
1	(Russia) Angelina Melnikova	14.600	14.625	12.466	14.300	55.991	Q
2	(Russia) Viktoria Listunova	14.466	14.166	12.800	14.033	55.465	Q
3	(Russia) Vladislava Urazova	14.433	14.500	13.033	13.333	55.299	–
4	(Romania) Larisa Iordache	14.366	13.466	13.466	13.400	54.698	Q
5	(Italy) Martina Maggio	14.133	13.566	13.366	13.333	54.398	Q
6	(United Kingdom) Amelie Morgan	13.633	13.966	13.433	13.000	54.032	Q
7	(Italy) Vanessa Ferrari	14.233	13.266	12.633	13.633	53.765	Q
8	(United Kingdom) Jessica Gadirova	14.700	13.700	11.433	13.866	53.699	Q
9	(France) Carolann Héduit	14.100	13.466	12.933	13.100	53.599	Q
10	(Switzerland) Giulia Steingruber	15.033	12.800	12.000	13.466	53.299	Q
11	(United Kingdom) Alice Kinsella	14.225	13.166	12.666	13.033	53.090	–
12	(Portugal) Filipa Martins	13.566	14.166	12.800	12.333	52.865	Q
13	(Netherlands) Lieke Wevers	13.400	13.233	13.400	12.800	52.833	Q
14	(Germany) Elisabeth Seitz	13.700	14.233	12.133	12.766	52.832	Q
15	(Germany) Kim Bui	13.400	13.633	12.425	13.333	52.791	Q
16	(France) Marine Boyer	13.733	13.100	13.233	12.166	52.232	Q
17	(Ukraine) Anastasiia Bachynska	13.833	12.133	13.133	12.966	52.065	Q
18	(Italy) Alice D'Amato	13.800	13.966	11.666	12.100	51.532	–
19	(Latvia) Elīna Vihrova	13.300	12.700	13.233	12.266	51.499	Q
20	(Sweden) Tonya Paulsson	13.516	12.966	12.600	12.233	51.315	Q
21	(Finland) Maisa Kuusikko	13.800	13.566	12.133	11.700	51.199	Q
22	(Poland) Marta Pihan-Kulesza	13.400	12.066	13.133	12.433	51.032	Q
23	(Finland) Ada Hautala	13.333	12.766	12.466	12.333	50.898	Q
24	(Slovakia) Barbora Mokošová	12.966	13.400	12.166	12.166	50.698	Q
25	(France) Sheyen Petit	13.000	11.900	12.866	12.833	50.599	–
26	(Russia) Elena Gerasimova	13.266	13.800	11.600	11.833	50.499	–
27	(Republic of Ireland) Emma Slevin	13.500	12.933	12.033	11.966	50.432	Q
28	(United Kingdom) Phoebe Jakubczyk	13.333	11.466	12.700	12.866	50.365	–
29	(Hungary) Csenge Bácskay	13.933	12.400	12.066	11.866	50.265	Q
30	(Israel) Lihie Raz	13.433	12.066	12.266	12.333	50.098	Q
31	(Netherlands) Naomi Visser	13.033	11.933	12.400	12.566	49.932	R1
32	(Hungary) Zója Székely	13.166	11.833	12.233	12.433	49.665	R2
33	(Belgium) Jutta Verkest	13.366	12.933	10.466	12.833	49.598	R3

==== Vault ====
Rank	Gymnast	Vault 1				Vault 2				Total	Qual.
Rank	Gymnast	D Score	E Score	Pen.	Score 1	D Score	E Score	Pen.	Score 2	Total	Qual.
1	(United Kingdom) Jessica Gadirova	5.4	9.300		14.700	5.2	9.133		14.333	14.516	Q
2	(Russia) Angelina Melnikova	5.4	9.200		14.600	5.2	9.100		14.300	14.450	Q
3	(Switzerland) Giulia Steingruber	5.8	9.233		15.033	4.6	9.266		13.866	14.449	Q
4	(Azerbaijan) Marina Nekrasova	5.0	8.833		13.833	5.2	8.933		14.133	13.983	Q
5	(Hungary) Csenge Bácskay	5.0	8.933		13.933	4.8	8.800		13.600	13.766	Q
6	(Ukraine) Anastasiia Motak	5.4	8.733	0.100	14.033	4.8	8.600		13.400	13.716	Q
7	(Slovenia) Tjaša Kysselef	5.0	8.733		13.733	4.8	8.733		13.533	13.633	Q
8	(Hungary) Sára Péter	5.4	8.766	0.100	14.066	4.4	8.666		13.066	13.566	Q
9	(Germany) Sarah Voss	4.6	9.000		13.600	4.6	8.833		13.433	13.516	R1
10	(Austria) Jasmin Mader	5.0	8.833		13.833	4.6	8.500		13.100	13.466	R2
11	(Latvia) Elīna Vihrova	4.6	8.700		13.300	4.6	8.966		13.566	13.433	R3

==== Uneven bars ====
Rank	Gymnast	D Score	E Score	Pen.	Total	Qual.
1	(Russia) Angelina Melnikova	6.2	8.425		14.625	Q
2	(Russia) Vladislava Urazova	6.1	8.400		14.500	Q
3	(Germany) Elisabeth Seitz	6.2	8.033		14.233	Q
4	(Russia) Viktoria Listunova	6.0	8.166		14.166	–
4	(Portugal) Filipa Martins	6.0	8.166		14.166	Q
6	(Sweden) Jonna Adlerteg	6.0	8.000		14.000	Q
7	(Italy) Giorgia Villa	5.7	8.266		13.966	Q
8	(United Kingdom) Amelie Morgan	5.8	8.166		13.966	Q
9	(Italy) Alice D'Amato	5.9	8.066		13.966	Q
10	(Belgium) Fien Enghels	5.6	8.300		13.900	R1
11	(Russia) Elena Gerasimova	5.9	7.900		13.800	–
12	(United Kingdom) Jessica Gadirova	5.4	8.300		13.700	R2
13	(Ukraine) Diana Varinska	5.6	8.066		13.666	R3

==== Balance beam ====
Rank	Gymnast	D Score	E Score	Pen.	Total	Qual.
1	(Romania) Larisa Iordache	6.1	7.366		13.466	Q
2	(Netherlands) Sanne Wevers	5.3	8.133		13.433	Q
3	(United Kingdom) Amelie Morgan	5.4	8.033		13.433	Q
4	(Netherlands) Lieke Wevers	5.2	8.200		13.400	Q
5	(Italy) Martina Maggio	5.2	8.166		13.366	Q
6	(France) Mélanie de Jesus dos Santos	5.4	7.966		13.366	Q
7	(Latvia) Elīna Vihrova	5.2	8.033		13.233	Q
8	(France) Marine Boyer	5.5	7.733		13.233	Q
9	(Poland) Marta Pihan-Kulesza	5.4	7.733		13.133	R1
10	(Ukraine) Anastasiia Bachynska	5.6	7.533		13.133	R2
11	(Russia) Vladislava Urazova	5.6	7.433		13.033	R3

==== Floor ====
Rank	Gymnast	D Score	E Score	Pen.	Total	Qual.
1	(Russia) Angelina Melnikova	6.0	8.300		14.300	Q
2	(Russia) Viktoria Listunova	5.6	8.433		14.033	Q
3	(United Kingdom) Jessica Gadirova	5.5	8.366		13.866	Q
4	(Italy) Vanessa Ferrari	5.7	7.933		13.633	Q
5	(Switzerland) Giulia Steingruber	5.3	8.166		13.466	Q
6	(Romania) Larisa Iordache	5.7	8.000	0.300	13.400	Q
7	(Italy) Martina Maggio	5.3	8.133	0.100	13.333	Q
8	(Russia) Vladislava Urazova	5.2	8.133		13.333	–
9	(Germany) Kim Bui	5.3	8.033		13.333	Q
10	(Romania) Maria Ceplinschi	5.3	7.966		13.266	R1
11	(France) Carolann Héduit	5.1	8.000		13.100	R2
12	(United Kingdom) Alice Kinsella	5.1	7.933		13.033	R3
