= Gymnastics at the 2019 European Games – Women's vault =

The women's artistic gymnastics vault final at the 2019 European Games was held at the Minsk Arena on June 30.

== Qualification ==
Qualification took place on June 27. Sára Péter from Hungary qualified in first, followed by Azerbaijan's Marina Nekrasova and Angelina Melnikova of Russia.

The reserves were:

1. Dominika Ponížilová (CZE)
2. Elīna Vihrova (LAT)
3. Denisa Golgotă (ROU)

== Medalists ==
	Gold	Silver	Bronze
Vault	Teja Belak (SLO)	Angelina Melnikova (RUS)	Sára Péter (HUN)

== Results ==
Oldest and youngest competitors

	Name	Country	Date of birth	Age
Youngest	Sára Péter	Hungary	July 6, 2002	16 years, 11 months and 24 days
Oldest	Gabriela Janik	Poland	March 10, 1993	26 years, 3 months and 20 days

Rank	Gymnast	Vault 1				Vault 2				Total
Rank	Gymnast	D Score	E Score	Pen.	Score 1	D Score	E Score	Pen.	Score 2	Total
1st place, gold medalist(s)	Teja Belak (SLO)	5.400	9.033		14.433	5.000	9.133		14.133	14.283
2nd place, silver medalist(s)	Angelina Melnikova (RUS)	5.400	8.800	0.100	14.100	5.200	8.966		14.166	14.133
3rd place, bronze medalist(s)	Sára Péter (HUN)	5.400	8.933		14.333	5.000	8.800		13.800	14.066
4	Gabriela Janik (POL)	4.800	8.833		13.633	4.800	8.966		13.766	13.699
5	Ofir Netzer (ISR)	4.800	8.900		13.700	4.800	8.833		13.633	13.666
6	Marina Nekrasova (AZE)	5.400	7.600	0.100	12.900	5.200	8.833		14.033	13.466
