= Tjaša Kysselef =

Slovenian artistic gymnast (born 1993)

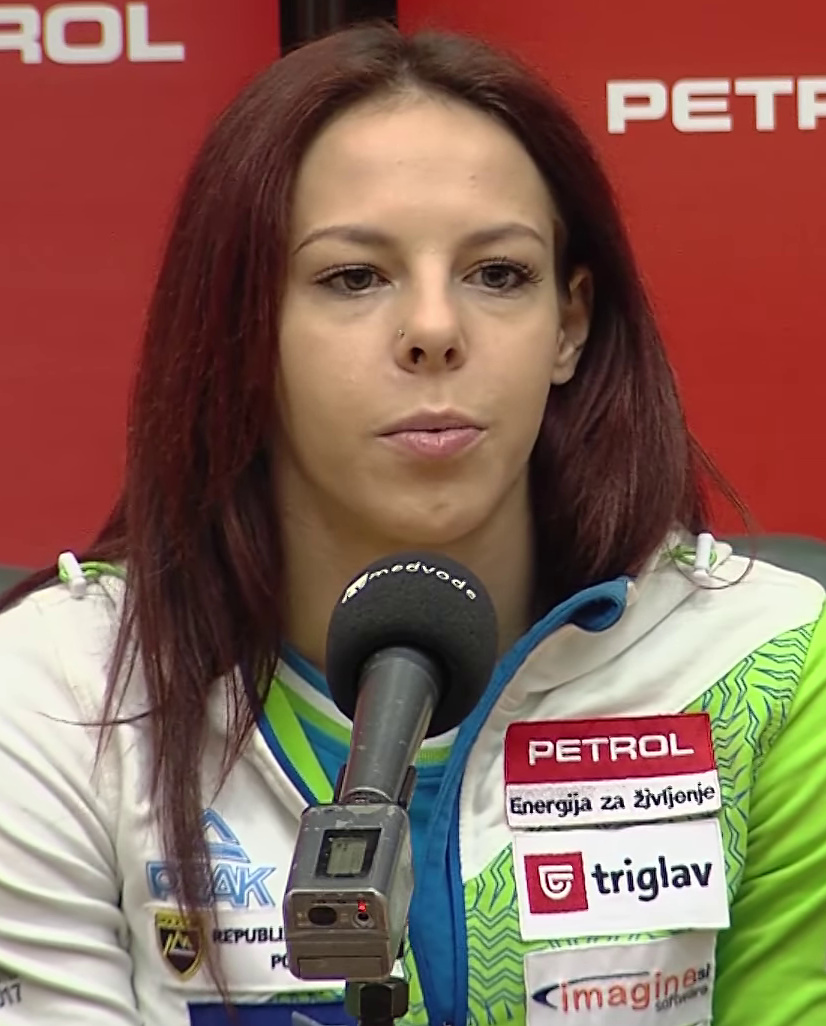
- Kysselef in 2019

Personal information
- Nickname: Kisla
- Born: 27 April 1993 (age 33) Ljubljana, Slovenia

Gymnastics career
- Discipline: Women's artistic gymnastics
- Country represented: Slovenia; (2008–present (SLO))
- Club: GD Zelena Jama
- Head coach: Andrej Mavric
Medal record
Representing Slovenia
Women's artistic gymnastics
Mediterranean Games
| Silver medal – second place | 2018 Tarragona | Vault |
FIG World Cup
| Event | 1st | 2nd | 3rd |
|---|---|---|---|
| World Cup | 3 | 3 | 4 |
| World Challenge Cup | 1 | 6 | 7 |
| Total | 4 | 9 | 11 |

Tjaša Kysselef (born 27 April 1993) is a Slovenian artistic gymnast and a member of the Slovenian national team. Throughout her career, she has primarily competed as a vault specialist and has been successful on the FIG World Cup circuit. She has represented Slovenia at seven World Championships: 2009, 2010, 2015, 2017, 2018, 2019 and 2021. She is the 2018 Mediterranean Games vault silver medalist.

== Career ==
=== 2009–2010 ===
Kysselef won a silver medal on the vault at the 2009 Doha World Cup. She then competed at the 2009 World Championships and finished 55th in the all-around during the qualification round. She won a vault bronze medal at the 2010 Ostrava World Cup. Then at the 2010 World Championships, she finished 93rd in the all-around during the qualification round. Additionally, she helped the Slovenian team finish 26th.

=== 2015–2016 ===
Kysselef won a vault silver medal at the 2015 Cottbus World Cup behind Oksana Chusovitina. She finished 96th in the all-around during the qualification round of the 2015 World Championships.

At the 2016 Baku World Challenge Cup, Kysselef won the vault silver medal behind Oksana Chusovitina. She then won bronze medals at the World Challenge Cup stages in Doha, Cottbus, and Ljubljana. Then at the Osijek World Challenge Cup, she won the vault silver medal behind Ellie Downie. She was the first reserve for the vault final at the 2016 European Championships.

=== 2017–2018 ===
Kysselef won the vault bronze medal at the 2017 Osijek World Challenge Cup behind Hungarians Boglárka Dévai and Zsófia Kovács. She also won the bronze medal at the Cottbus World Cup.

Kysselef won the vault title at the 2018 Melbourne World Cup, and she won a bronze medal on the floor exercise. She then won the vault bronze medal at the Baku World Cup. She competed at the 2018 Mediterranean Games and won the vault silver medal behind Egypt's Nancy Taman. At the 2018 European Championships, she was the first reserve for the vault final. At the Osijek World Challenge Cup, she won the vault silver medal, and she won the bronze medal at the Paris World Challenge Cup.

=== 2019–2021 ===
Kysselef won the vault bronze medal at the 2019 Osijek World Challenge Cup. She then won the silver medal behind teammate Teja Belak at the Mersin World Challenge Cup. At the 2019 European Championships, she was the third reserve for the vault final.

At the 2021 European Championships, Kysselef qualified for the vault final and finished fifth. She won the vault title at the 2021 Koper World Challenge Cup. She then won the silver medal at the Mersin World Challenge Cup behind Csenge Bácskay.

=== 2022–2023 ===
Kysselef won the vault gold medal at the 2022 Cottbus World Cup, and she also won at the World Cup stage in Cairo. She finished fourth in the vault final at the 2022 Mediterranean Games. At the Osijek World Challenge Cup, she won the vault bronze medal. She then won the silver medal at the Koper World Challenge Cup behind Zsófia Kovács.

=== 2024–2025 ===
Kysselef won the vault title at the 2024 Antalya World Challenge Cup. She then won the bronze medal at the Osijek World Challenge Cup behind Coline Devillard and Gréta Mayer.

Kysselef won the vault silver medal behind teammate Teja Belak at the 2025 Cottbus World Cup. She then won the bronze medal behind Oksana Chusovitina and Belak at the Baku World Cup. She won another silver medal behind Belak at the Doha World Cup.

== Personal life ==
Kysselef works as a gymnastics coach and judge to fund her training.
