= Anastasiia Bachynska =

Ukrainian artistic gymnast (born 2003)

Anastasiia Bachynska Анастасія Бачинська
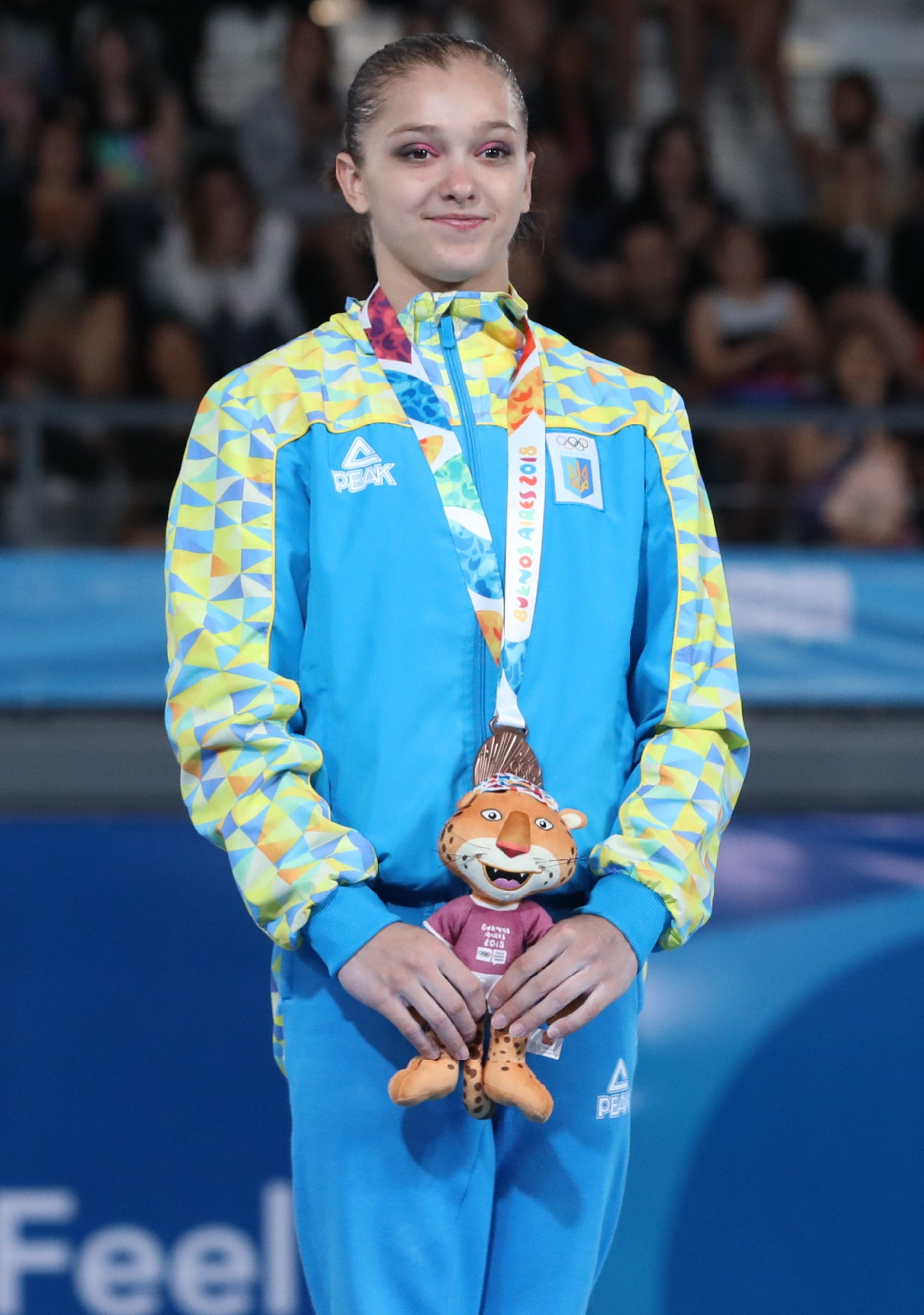
- Bachynska at the 2018 Youth Olympics

Personal information
- Full name: Anastasiia Yuriivna Bachynska
- Alternative name: Anastasia/Anastasiya
- Nickname: Bachyna
- Born: 4 August 2003 (age 23) Ternopil, Ukraine

Gymnastics career
- Discipline: Women's artistic gymnastics
- Country represented: Ukraine; (2017–2022)
- Club: Children's and Youth Sport School No. 2 of the City of Ternopil
- Gym: Koncha-Zaspa Olympic Training and Sports Center
- Head coaches: Anna Lev; Oksana Pershina
- Former coach: Tetiana Gerashchenko
- Choreographer: Nadia Ostapenko
- Retired: 15 August 2022
Medal record
Representing Ukraine
European Games
Gold medal – first place	2019 Minsk	Floor Exercise
European Championships
Gold medal – first place	2020 Mersin	Team
Bronze medal – third place	2021 Basel	Balance Beam
Youth Olympic Games
Bronze medal – third place	2018 Buenos Aires	All-Around
Bronze medal – third place	2018 Buenos Aires	Floor Exercise
Gymnasiade
Gold medal – first place	2018 Marrakesh	All-Around
Gold medal – first place	2018 Marrakesh	Vault
Gold medal – first place	2018 Marrakesh	Balance Beam
Silver medal – second place	2018 Marrakesh	Team
FIG World Cup
Event	1st	2nd	3rd
Apparatus World Cup	1	1	1
World Challenge Cup	1	1	0
Total	2	2	1

Anastasiia Yuriivna Bachynska (Ukrainian: Анастасія Юріївна Бачинська, born 4 August 2003) is a Ukrainian bodybuilder and former artistic gymnast. She is the 2019 European Games floor exercise champion, the 2021 European balance beam bronze medalist, and the 2018 Youth Olympic all-around and floor exercise bronze medalist. She was also a member of the gold medal-winning team at the 2020 European Championships.

== Early life ==
Bachynska was born in Ternopil, Ternopil Oblast, Ukraine on 4 August 2003. She began gymnastics in 2007. She comes from a large family and is the second oldest of four children; her older brother is a programmer, her younger brother is a musician and her younger sister is an artist. Her father Yurii Bachynskyi was killed in battle during the Russo-Ukrainian War.

== Junior gymnastics career ==
Bachynska made her international debut at the France Top 12 meet in March 2017. She later competed at the Stella Zakharova Cup, sweeping the junior events.

In 2018, Bachynska was selected to represent Ukraine at the 2018 Youth Olympics. She qualified in first place to the all-around and floor exercise finals, second on vault, uneven bars, and balance beam. During the all-around final she finished third behind Giorgia Villa of Italy and Amelie Morgan of Great Britain after falling on floor exercise. During event finals Bachynska won bronze on floor exercise (behind Villa and Morgan), placed fourth on vault (behind Villa, Csenge Bácskay of Hungary, and Emma Spence of Canada) and sixth on uneven bars and balance beam. It was later revealed that Bachynska had competed at the Youth Olympic Games with a collarbone injury and was advised by doctors to rest for two months afterwards.

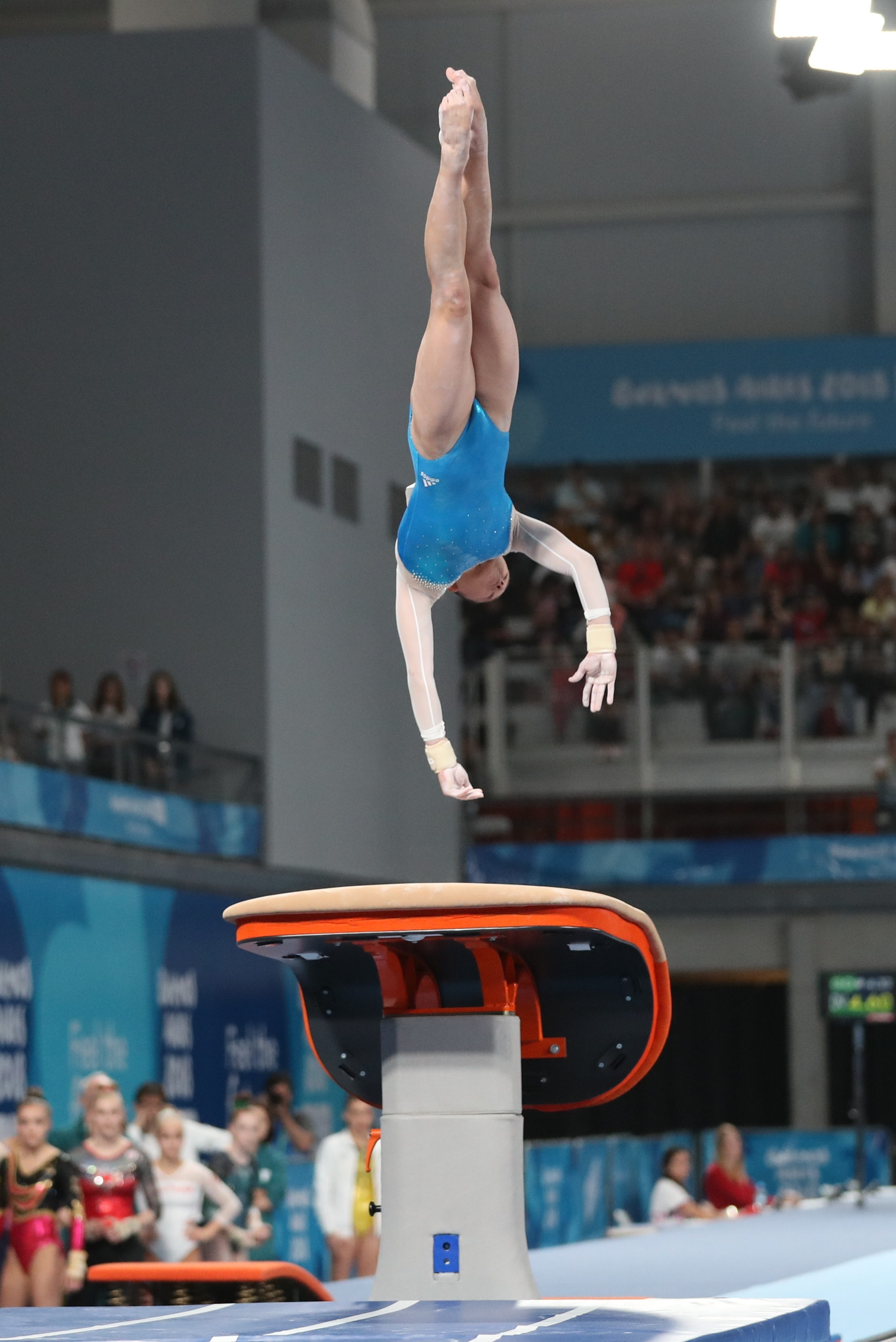
Vault Final

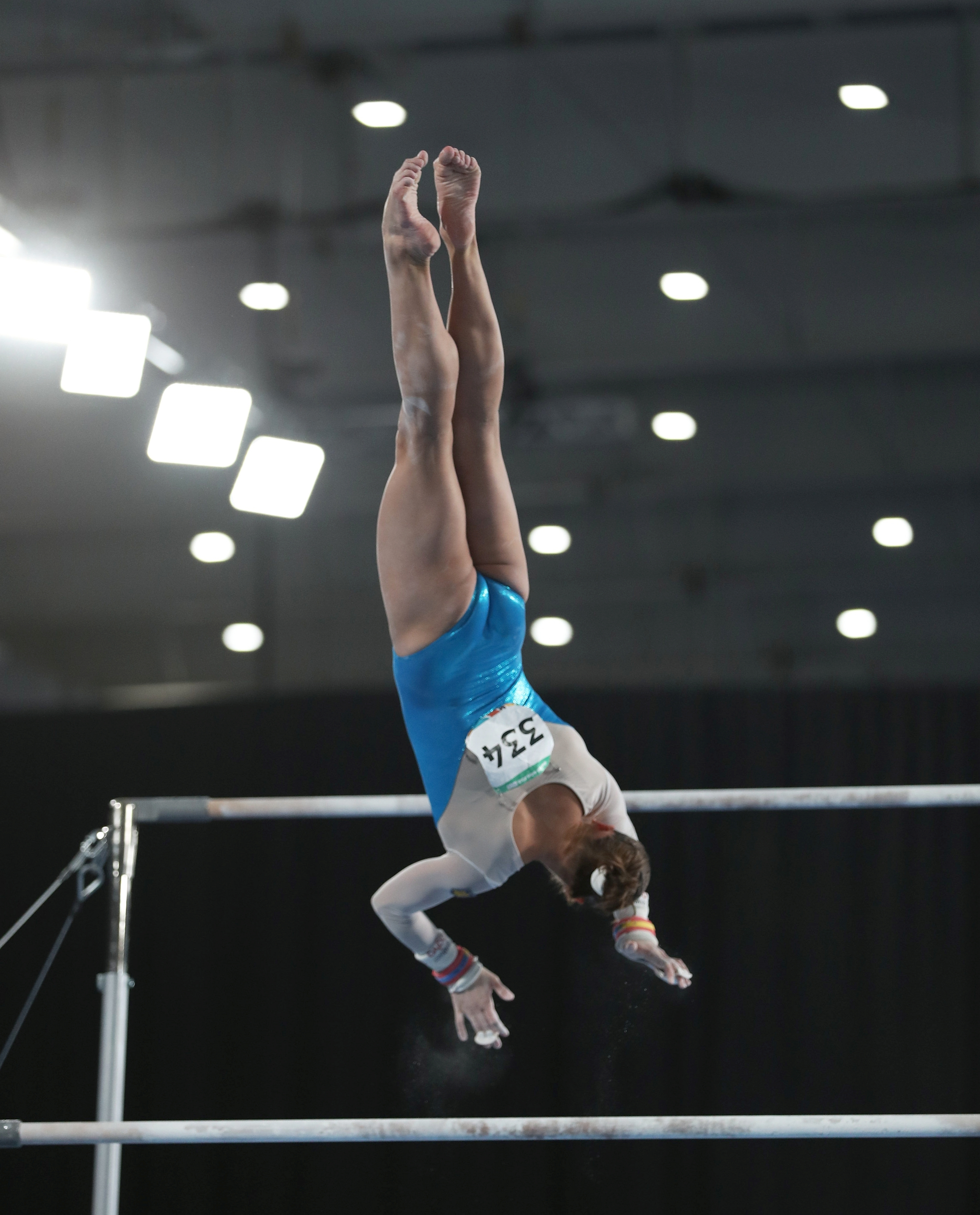
Uneven Bars Final

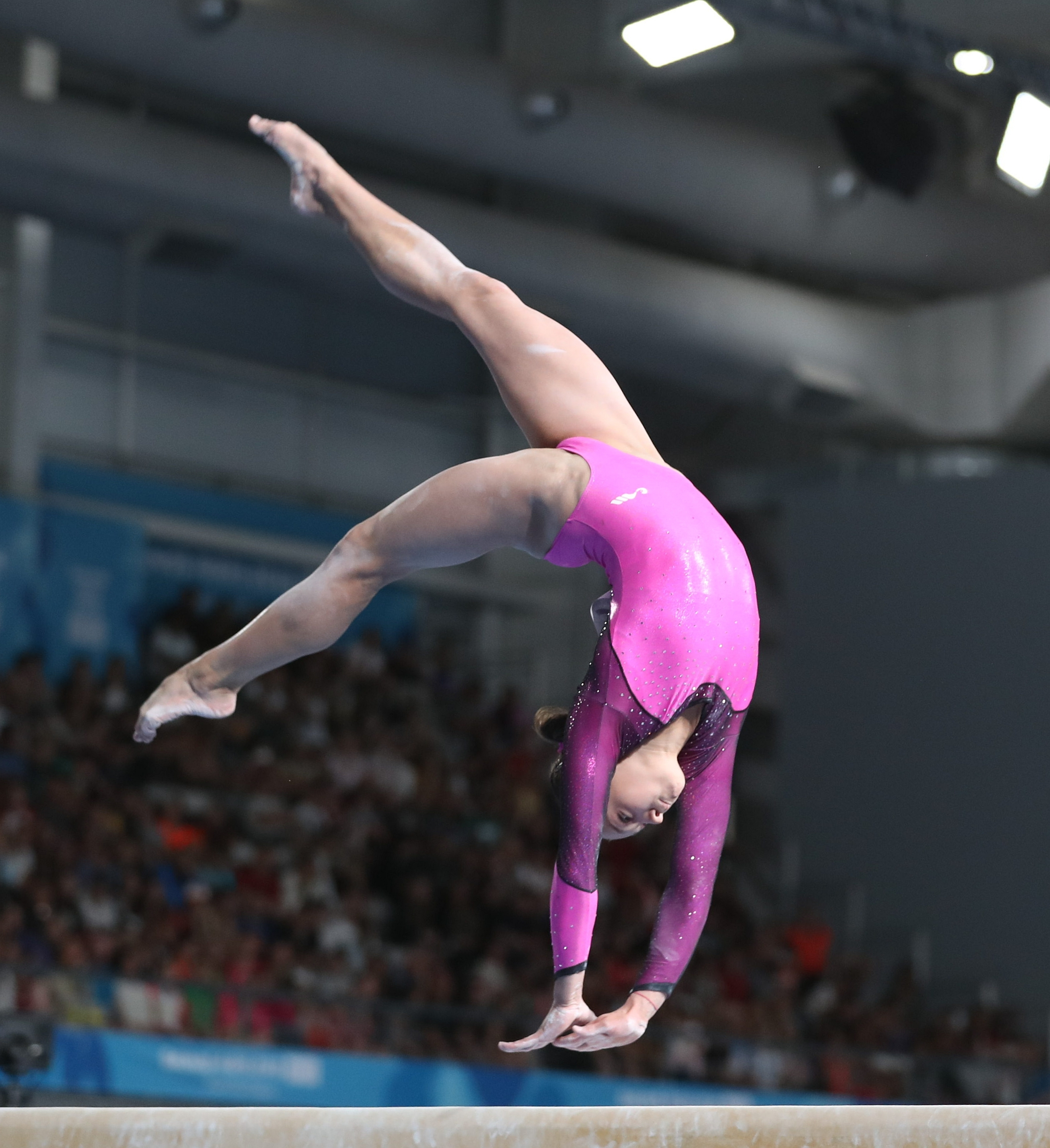
Balance Beam Final

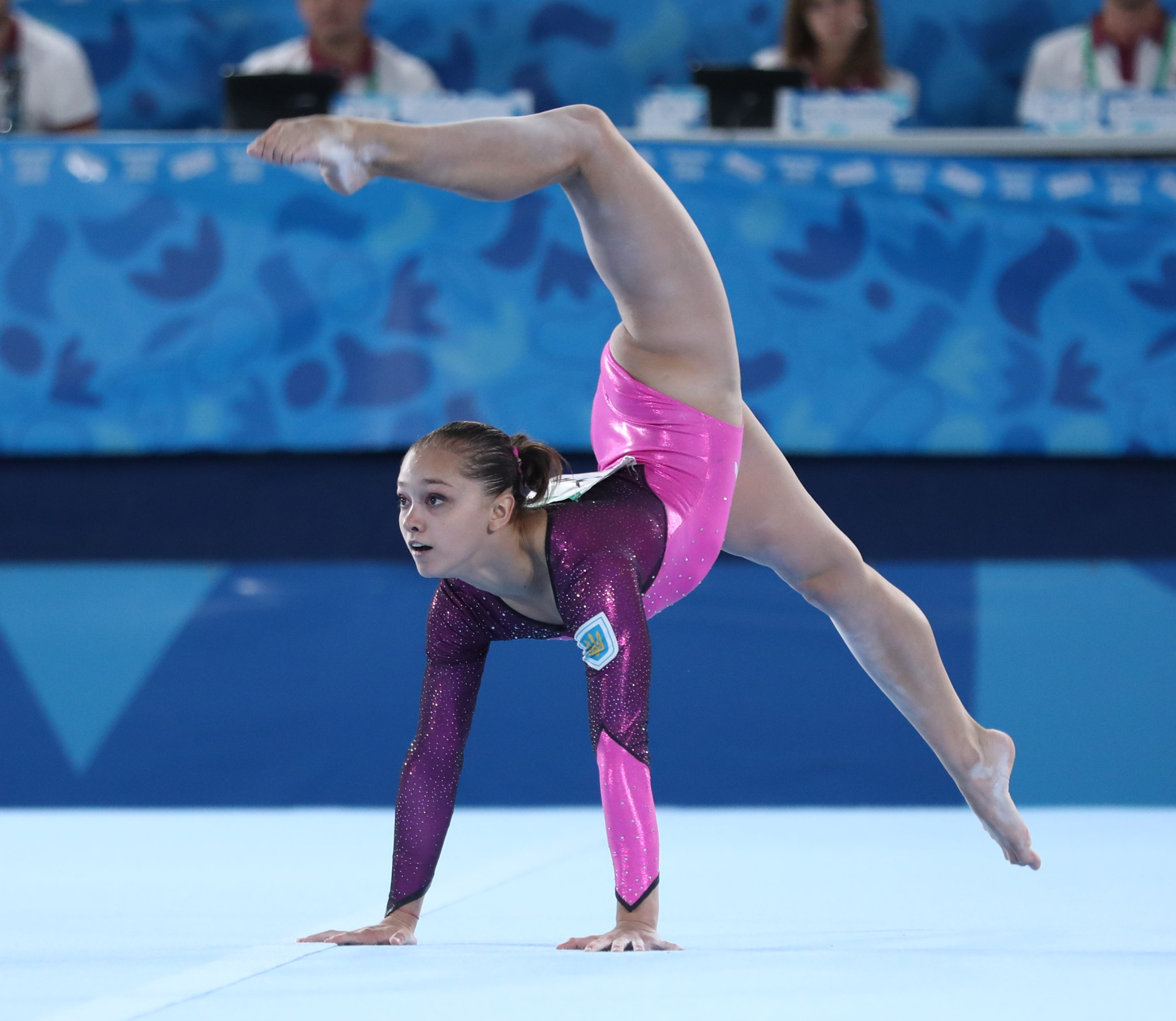
Floor Exercise Final

Bachynska at the 2018 Youth Olympics

== Senior gymnastics career ==
=== 2019 ===
Bachynska turned senior in 2019 and made her debut at the Ukrainian Championships. She finished second behind Angelina Radivilova. She later competed at the Baku World Cup where she qualified to the uneven bars and balance beam finals. She finished seventh in the uneven bars final and fourth in the balance beam final, incurring a 0.5 penalty for having her coach present on the podium. In April Bachynska competed at the 2019 European Championships where she placed fifth in the all-around and seventh on the balance beam.

In June Bachynska competed at the European Games alongside Diana Varinska and Angelina Radivilova, where she qualified to the all-around in fourth place and the floor exercise final in second. During the individual all-around final she suffered mishaps on the uneven bars and the floor exercise and she finished in 14th place. During the floor exercise final she performed cleanly and won gold.

After her success at the European Games, Bachynska received an apartment from the mayor of Ternopil. She was also awarded the Order of Princess Olga by the President of Ukraine, Volodymyr Zelenskyy.

In September Bachynska competed at the Paris Challenge Cup where she won silver on balance beam behind Anastasia Agafonova of Russia and placed sixth on uneven bars.

In October Bachynska competed at the 2019 World Championships where she finished the all-around with a score of 52.165 and did not qualify to any event finals nor was Ukraine able to qualify a team to the 2020 Olympic Games. Due to teammate Diana Varinska scoring higher than her, Bachynska was not able to qualify as an individual to the 2020 Olympics either.

In November Bachynska competed at the Cottbus World Cup where she placed fifth on balance beam but won gold on floor exercise.

=== 2020 ===
In late January Bachynska was listed on a nominative roster that was released for the Melbourne World Cup, taking place on 20–22 February. While there she qualified to the uneven bars and balance beam finals where she placed seventh and third respectively. She later competed at the Baku World Cup; during qualifications she finished seventh on vault, sixth on uneven bars, and third on balance beam and therefore qualified to the event finals. However event finals were canceled due to the COVID-19 pandemic in Azerbaijan.

In December Bachynska competed at the European Championships. During qualifications she helped Ukraine qualify second to the team final behind Romania and individually she qualified to the balance beam final. During the team final Romania suffered many mishaps which allowed Ukraine to win team gold.

=== 2021 ===
Bachynska competed at the 2021 European Championships in Basel where she qualified to the all-around final and was the second reserve for the balance beam final. During the all-around final she placed 20th. Bachynska was able to compete in the balance beam final after top qualifier Larisa Iordache withdrew due to a kidney infection and first reserve Marta Pihan-Kulesza withdrew due to an injury sustained during the all-around final. Bachynska performed a clean routine and finished third behind Mélanie de Jesus dos Santos and Sanne Wevers.

Bachynksa next competed at the Varna World Challenge Cup where she won gold on the balance beam and placed sixth on the uneven bars. In June she competed at the Cairo World Challenge Cup where she finished eighth on balance beam.

At the World Championships Bachynska qualified to the all-around and floor exercise finals where she finished tenth and seventh respectively.

=== 2022 ===
In February Russia invaded Ukraine. During the ongoing war Bachynska and her family fled their home country for Beaucaire, France, where Bachynska had been a member of their club, Gym Flip, and competed with them in France's Top 12 competitions.

On 15 August Bachynska announced her retirement from the sport.

== Bodybuilding career ==
Bachynska is currently a fitness coach in her native town Ternopil. In November 2025, she took part in the Ukrainian Bodybuilding Championships.

== Competitive history ==
Year	Event	Team	AA	VT	UB	BB	FX
Junior
2017	France Top 12	8	29				
2017	Stella Zakharova Cup	1st place, gold medalist(s)	1st place, gold medalist(s)	1st place, gold medalist(s)	1st place, gold medalist(s)	1st place, gold medalist(s)	1st place, gold medalist(s)
2017	Gym Festival Trnava		1st place, gold medalist(s)	3rd place, bronze medalist(s)	2nd place, silver medalist(s)	1st place, gold medalist(s)	2nd place, silver medalist(s)
2017	Euro Youth Olympic Festival	12	11		5	4	6
2017	Ukrainian Championships		2nd place, silver medalist(s)	1st place, gold medalist(s)	2nd place, silver medalist(s)	4	1st place, gold medalist(s)
2017	Top 12 Series 1			1st place, gold medalist(s)	3rd place, bronze medalist(s)	1st place, gold medalist(s)	1st place, gold medalist(s)
2018	Top 12 Series 4			1st place, gold medalist(s)	3rd place, bronze medalist(s)	1st place, gold medalist(s)	1st place, gold medalist(s)
2018	Gymnasiade	2nd place, silver medalist(s)	1st place, gold medalist(s)	1st place, gold medalist(s)		1st place, gold medalist(s)	
2018	Gym Festival Trnava		1st place, gold medalist(s)	1st place, gold medalist(s)	1st place, gold medalist(s)	1st place, gold medalist(s)	4
2018	Youth Olympic Games Qualifier		1st place, gold medalist(s)				
2018	European Championships	8	11	4			
2018	Youth Olympic Games		3rd place, bronze medalist(s)	4	6	6	3rd place, bronze medalist(s)
Senior
2019	Ukrainian Championships		2nd place, silver medalist(s)	1st place, gold medalist(s)	2nd place, silver medalist(s)	1st place, gold medalist(s)	1st place, gold medalist(s)
2019	Baku World Cup				7	4	
2019	European Championships		5			7	
2019	European Games		14				1st place, gold medalist(s)
2019	Paris Challenge Cup				6	2nd place, silver medalist(s)	
2019	Cottbus World Cup					5	1st place, gold medalist(s)
2020	Melbourne World Cup				7	3rd place, bronze medalist(s)	
2020	Baku World Cup			(Note: Bachynska qualified to the VT, UB, and BB event finals; however event finals were canceled)			
2020	European Championships	1st place, gold medalist(s)				4	
2021
2021	European Championships		20			3rd place, bronze medalist(s)	
2021	Varna Challenge Cup				6	1st place, gold medalist(s)	
2021	Cairo Challenge Cup					8	
2021	Osijek Challenge Cup					4	8
2021	Doha World Cup				2nd place, silver medalist(s)	7	4
2021	Mersin Challenge Cup			7	4	4	4
2021	World Championships		10				7
