= Bianka Schermann =

Hungarian artistic gymnast

- Born: 26 June 2003 (age 23) Budapest, Hungary

Gymnastics career
- Discipline: Women's artistic gymnastics
- Country represented: Hungary; (2017–present)
- Club: MTK Budapest
- Head coach: Mariann Botyanszky
Medal record
Women's artistic gymnastics
Representing Hungary
FIG World Cup
Event	1st	2nd	3rd
World Challenge Cup	0	1	0

Bianka Schermann (born 26 June 2003) is a Hungarian artistic gymnast and a member of the Hungary women's national gymnastics team. She competed at the 2019 World Championships and the 2019 European Games, and took the silver medal on vault at the 2021 Cairo World Challenge Cup.

== Personal life ==
Schermann was born on 26 June 2003 in Budapest. She is the older sister of figure skater Regina Schermann. Bianka speaks English and Mandarin in addition to Hungarian.

== Career ==
=== Junior ===
In June 2017, Schermann placed fourth in the all-around at the Gym Festival Trnava in Slovakia, where she also took the bronze medal in the junior uneven bars final. In July, Schermann was selected to the Hungarian team for the 2017 European Youth Olympic Festival alongside Csenge Bácskay and Nóra Fehér. The team finished fourth behind Russia, Italy and Germany. Individually, Schermann placed ninth in the all-around and seventh on floor exercise. Later that year, Schermann competed at the Olympic Hopes Cup, placing ninth in the all-around and sixth on vault. At the Hungarian Master Championships, Schermann won the all-around, also taking the gold on vault and floor, silver on beam and bronze on the uneven bars.

In May 2018, Schermann competed at the 2018 Gymnasiade in Morocco, where the Hungarian team of Schermann, Nóra Fehér, Csenge Bácskay, Sára Péter and Zója Székely won the gold medal. Schermann also tied for the bronze medal on the floor exercise. Schermann represented Hungary at the 2018 European Championships, where she finished sixteenth in the junior all-around competition.

=== Senior ===
Schermann made her international senior debut at the 2019 DTB Team Challenge in Germany, where she finished thirteenth in the all-around and seventh with the Hungarian team. In June 2019, Schermann was selected to compete at the 2019 European Games in Minsk. She qualified to the all-around final where she placed ninth. In September, Schermann competed at the Szombathely World Challenge Cup, finishing sixth in both the uneven bars and floor exercise finals. Schermann was selected to the Hungarian team for the 2019 World Championships alongside Dorina Böczögő, Zsófia Kovács, Noémi Makra and Sára Péter. The team finished eighteenth in qualifications. Individuallly, Schermann placed 44th in the all-around and did not advance to the finals.

Schermann missed the 2020 European Championships due to injury.

In May 2021, Schermann competed at the Varna World Challenge Cup in Bulgaria, where she finished sixth in the vault final. In June, she competed at the Cairo World Challenge Cup in Egypt, where she took the silver medal in the vault final behind Nancy Taman. She also qualified to the floor exercise final, where she placed eighth. At the Flanders International Team Challenge (FIT Challenge), Schermann contributed to the Hungarian team's ninth-place finish.

== Competitive history ==
Competitive history of Bianka Schermann at the junior level
Year	Event	Team	AA	VT	UB	BB	FX
2017	Elek Matolay Memorial		3rd place, bronze medalist(s)	1st place, gold medalist(s)	1st place, gold medalist(s)	5	4
2017	Zelena Jama Open		5				1st place, gold medalist(s)
2017	Gym Festival Trnava		4		3rd place, bronze medalist(s)		
2017	Slovak Junior Friendly	1st place, gold medalist(s)	1st place, gold medalist(s)		2nd place, silver medalist(s)	2nd place, silver medalist(s)	1st place, gold medalist(s)
2017	European Youth Olympic Festival	4	9				7
2017	Olympic Hopes Cup		9	6			
2017	Hungarian Master Championships		1st place, gold medalist(s)	1st place, gold medalist(s)	3rd place, bronze medalist(s)	2nd place, silver medalist(s)	1st place, gold medalist(s)
2018	Gymnasiade	1st place, gold medalist(s)					3rd place, bronze medalist(s)
2018	Elek Matolay Memorial		2nd place, silver medalist(s)	1st place, gold medalist(s)	4	1st place, gold medalist(s)	6
2018	Youth Olympic Games Qualifier		9				
2018	Budapest Friendly	1st place, gold medalist(s)	1st place, gold medalist(s)	1st place, gold medalist(s)	2nd place, silver medalist(s)	3rd place, bronze medalist(s)	3rd place, bronze medalist(s)
2018	European Championships	9	16				
2018	Hungarian Championships		1st place, gold medalist(s)	1st place, gold medalist(s)	1st place, gold medalist(s)	1st place, gold medalist(s)	1st place, gold medalist(s)
2018	Győr Friendly	1st place, gold medalist(s)		3rd place, bronze medalist(s)			
2018	Hungarian Master Championships		5	4	6	6	

Competitive history of Bianka Schermann at the senior level
Year	Event	Team	AA	VT	UB	BB	FX
2019	Hungarian National League Championships				7	2nd place, silver medalist(s)	
2019	DTB Team Challenge	7	13				
2019	Elek Matolay Memorial		2nd place, silver medalist(s)		3rd place, bronze medalist(s)	7	
2019	International GymSport		10	1st place, gold medalist(s)		3rd place, bronze medalist(s)	6
2019	Gym Festival Trnava		1st place, gold medalist(s)	1st place, gold medalist(s)	1st place, gold medalist(s)	3rd place, bronze medalist(s)	2nd place, silver medalist(s)
2019	European Games		9				
2019	Hungarian Championships		3rd place, bronze medalist(s)		2nd place, silver medalist(s)	4	5
2019	Szombathely World Challenge Cup				6		6
2019	2nd Heerenveen Friendly	4	10				
2019	World Championships	18	44				
2019	Hungarian Master Championships		7	2nd place, silver medalist(s)	2nd place, silver medalist(s)	5	
2020	Hungarian Championships		6		6	5	
2020	Hungarian Master Championships	2nd place, silver medalist(s)	4	3rd place, bronze medalist(s)	3rd place, bronze medalist(s)	3rd place, bronze medalist(s)	
2021	Hungarian Team Championships	3rd place, bronze medalist(s)	8				
2021	Hungarian Event Championships					8	
2021	Varna World Challenge Cup			6			
2021	Cairo World Challenge Cup			2nd place, silver medalist(s)			8
2021	FIT Challenge	9					
2022	Doha World Cup				6		5
2022	Baku World Cup					7	7
