= Sára Péter =

Hungarian artistic gymnast (born 2002)

- Full name: Sára Eszter Péter
- Born: 6 July 2002 (age 24) Budapest, Hungary

Gymnastics career
- Discipline: Women's artistic gymnastics
- Country represented: Hungary
- Club: Postas SE
- Head coach: Imre Draskoczy
Medal record
Women's artistic gymnastics
Representing Hungary
European Games
Bronze medal – third place	2019 Minsk	Vault
FIG World Cup
Event	1st	2nd	3rd
Apparatus World Cup	0	0	1
World Challenge Cup	0	1	0
Total	0	1	1

Sára Eszter Péter (born 6 July 2002) is a Hungarian artistic gymnast. She is the 2019 European Games bronze medalist on the vault and is a four-time European Championships vault finalist. She won a silver medal on the vault at the 2019 Paris World Challenge Cup.

== Gymnastics career ==
At the junior level, Péter won the silver medal in the all-around at the 2017 Hungarian Championships.

=== 2018 ===
Péter became age-eligible for senior international competition in 2018. She competed at the 2018 Gymnasiade where the Hungarian team of Péter, Nóra Fehér, Csenge Bácskay, Bianka Schermann, Zoja Szekely won the gold medal. Péter won the bronze medal on the vault. She then won a bronze medal in the all-around at the Elek Matolay Memorial. At the Koper World Challenge Cup, she finished seventh on the vault and floor exercise and eighth on the balance beam. Then at the Guimaraes World Challenge Cup, she finished seventh on the vault.

Péter competed at the 2018 European Championships alongside Noémi Makra, Dorina Böczögő, Boglárka Dévai, and Nóra Fehér. They finished sixth in the qualification round and qualified for the team final, where they finished eighth. Individually, Péter was the second reserve for the vault final. She then became the Hungarian national champion on the vault. She was selected for the 2018 World Championships with Dorina Böczögő, Nóra Fehér, Zsofia Kovacs, and Noémi Makra, and they finished 17th in the team qualification round.

=== 2019 ===
At the European Championships, Péter finished seventh in the vault event final. Then at the European Games, she won the bronze medal on vault behind Teja Belak and Angelina Melnikova. She competed at the Paris World Challenge Cup and won the silver medal on vault behind Oksana Chusovitina. At the Hungarian Championships, she won the silver medal on the floor exercise behind Dorina Böczögő and placed sixth on the vault. She competed at the World Championships, and the Hungarian team of Péter, Zsófia Kovács, Noémi Makra, and Bianka Schermann finished 18th.

=== 2020–2025 ===
At the 2020 Hungarian Championships, Péter finished fourth on the vault and fifth on the floor exercise. She qualified for the vault final at the 2021 European Championships and finished eighth. She won a silver medal on the vault at the 2021 Hungarian Championships behind Csenge Bácskay and a bronze medal on the balance beam.

Péter placed sixth on the floor exercise at the 2022 Elek Matolay Memorial. She finished sixth on the vault at the 2024 Antalya World Challenge Cup. At the 2024 Elek Matolay Memorial, she won a bronze medal on the vault. Then at the 2024 European Championships, she finished eighth in the vault final. She then won a silver medal on the vault at the 2024 RomGym Trophy behind Ana Bărbosu.

Péter finished seventh on the floor exercise at the 2025 Antalya World Cup.
