= Derin =

Derin, meaning "deep", is a Turkish unisex given name and surname. It may refer to:

- Derin (given name), Turkish given name

== Given name ==
- Derin Atakan (born 2006), Turkish kitesurfer
- Derin Erdoğan (born 2002), Turkish basketball player
- Derin Kumuk (born 2008), Turkish rower
- Derin Seale, Australian filmmaker
- Derin Tanrıyaşükür (2006–), Turkish artistic gymnast
- Derin Young, Australian producer and songwriter

== Surname ==
- Zafer Derin, Turkish archaeologist, worked on excavations at the Yeşilova Höyük site
- Zihni Derin (1880–1965), Turkish agriculturalist
