= Daniela Batrona =

Ukrainian artistic gymnast

Daniela Batrona Даніела Батрона
- Full name: Daniela Oleksandrivna Batrona
- Born: September 5, 2006 (age 20) Zdolbuniv, Rivne Oblast, Ukraine

Gymnastics career
- Discipline: Women's artistic gymnastics
- Country represented: Ukraine; (2018–2022)
- Club: Rivne CYSS No. 1
Medal record
Women's artistic gymnastics
Representing Ukraine
FIG World Cup
Event	1st	2nd	3rd
Apparatus World Cup	1	1	2
Total	1	1	2

Daniela Oleksandrivna Batrona (Ukrainian: Даніела Олександрівна Батрона, born 5 September 2006) is a Ukrainian artistic gymnast. She was a member of the silver medal-winning team at the 2020 Junior European Championships.

== Early life ==
Batrona was born in Zdolbuniv, Rivne Oblast, Ukraine on 5 September 2006.

== Gymnastics career ==
=== 2020–21 ===
Batrona competed at the Ukrainian Youth Championships where she finished first in the all-around and posted top-3 scores on all apparatuses. She was selected to represent Ukraine at the 2020 European Championships. While there she helped Ukraine finish second as a team behind Romania and individually she won bronze in the all-around behind Romanian gymnasts Ana Bărbosu and Maria Ceplinschi.

In May 2021 Batrona competed at the Ukraine International Cup where she helped her team finish second behind France. Individually she placed third in the all-around, second on vault, and first on uneven bars.

=== 2022 ===
Batrona turned senior in 2022. She made her senior international debut at the Cottbus World Cup in February. On the first day of qualifications Russia launched a full-scale invasion of Batrona's home country of Ukraine. Despite news of the war she won gold on balance beam and placed fourth on the uneven bars. Batrona next competed at the Doha World Cup where she qualified to the uneven bars and floor exercise finals. During the uneven bars final she placed third behind Russian athletes Viktoria Listunova and Maria Minaeva. The next day she won silver on floor exercise behind Minaeva. At the Cairo World Cup Batrona qualified to the uneven bars, balance beam, and floor exercise finals. She won bronze on balance beam and placed fourth on the other two apparatuses. Batrona finished the World Cup circuit competing at the Baku World Cup. She finished third on balance beam behind Sarah Voss and Lorette Charpy.

== Competitive history ==
Competitive history of Daniela Batrona
Year	Event	Team	AA	VT	UB	BB	FX
2018	Gym Festival Trnava		8				
2020	Ukrainian Youth Championships		1st place, gold medalist(s)	3rd place, bronze medalist(s)	1st place, gold medalist(s)	1st place, gold medalist(s)	2nd place, silver medalist(s)
2020	Junior European Championships	2nd place, silver medalist(s)	3rd place, bronze medalist(s)		8		4
2021	Ukraine International Cup	2nd place, silver medalist(s)	3rd place, bronze medalist(s)	2nd place, silver medalist(s)	1st place, gold medalist(s)		
2022	Cottbus World Cup				4	1st place, gold medalist(s)	
2022	Doha World Cup				3rd place, bronze medalist(s)		2nd place, silver medalist(s)
2022	Cairo World Cup				4	3rd place, bronze medalist(s)	4
2022	Baku World Cup					3rd place, bronze medalist(s)	
