= Anastasiia Motak =

Ukrainian artistic gymnast

Anastasiia Motak Анастасія Мотак
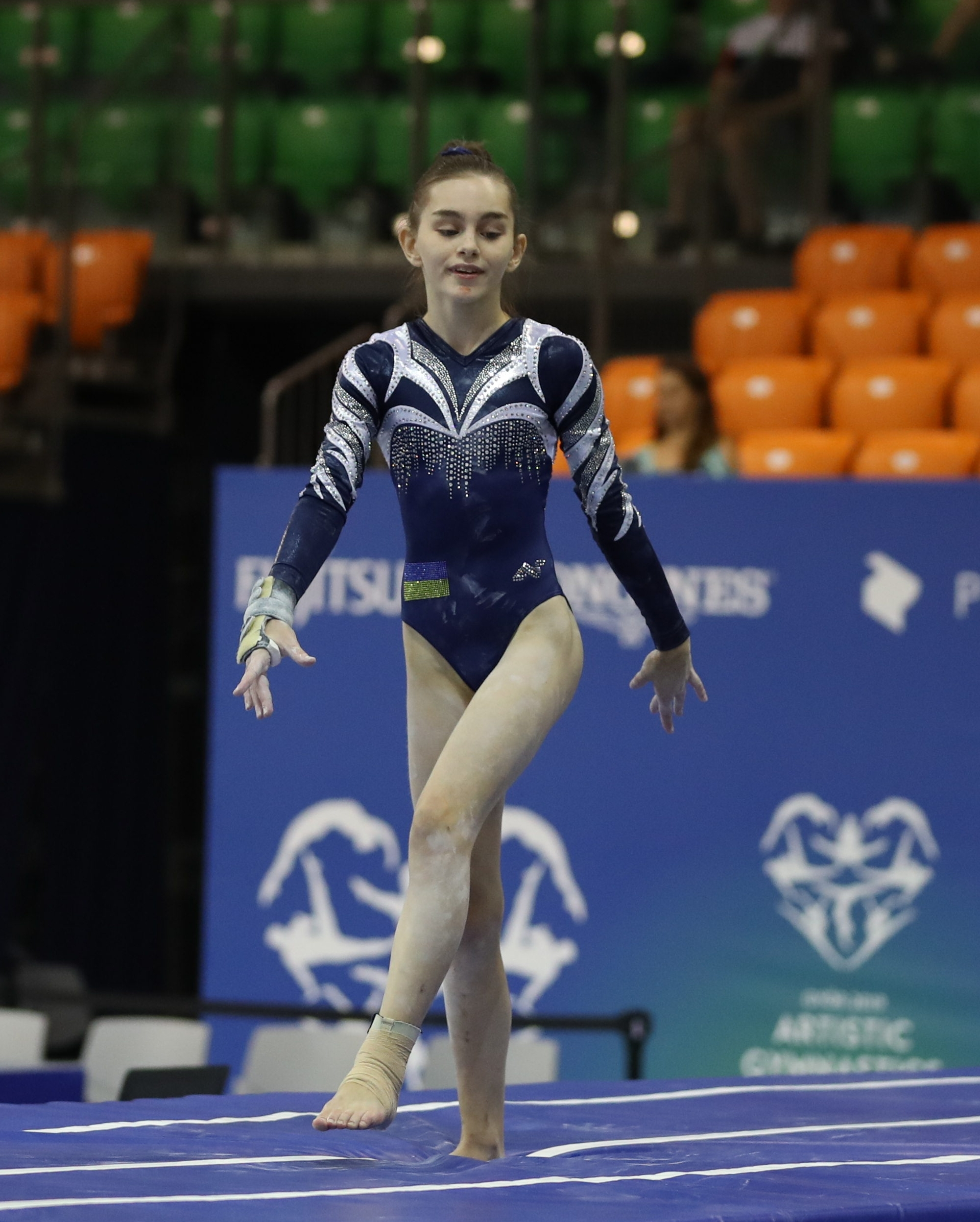
- Motak at the 2019 Junior World Championships

Personal information
- Full name: Anastasiia Maksimivna Motak
- Alternative name: Anastasia/Anastasiya
- Nickname: Nastya
- Born: November 12, 2004 (age 21) Zhytomyr, Ukraine

Gymnastics career
- Discipline: Women's artistic gymnastics
- Country represented: Ukraine; (2018–2021)
- Club: Children's and Youth Sports School No. 16 of the City of Kharkiv
- Gym: Koncha-Zaspa Olympic Training and Sports Center
- Head coaches: Oleg Ostapenko; Yulia Kaiukova
- Former coach: Olena Beliatska
- Choreographer: Nadia Ostapenko
Medal record
Women's artistic gymnastics
Representing Ukraine
European Championships
| Gold medal – first place | 2020 Mersin | Team |
| Bronze medal – third place | 2020 Mersin | Vault |
| Bronze medal – third place | 2020 Mersin | Balance Beam |
FIG World Cup
Event / 1st / 2nd / 3rd; World Challenge Cup / 0 / 1 / 0

Anastasiia Maksymivna Motak (Ukrainian: Анастасія Максимівна Мотак, born 12 November 2004) is a Ukrainian artistic gymnast. She is the 2020 Ukrainian National Champion and was a member of the gold medal-winning team at the 2020 European Championships.

== Early life ==
Motak was born in Zhytomyr, Zhytomyr Oblast, Ukraine on 12 November 2004. She began gymnastics in 2008 in Kharkiv.

== Gymnastics career ==
=== 2019 ===
Motak competed at the Ukrainian National Championships where she placed third amongst junior athletes. In April she competed at the Stella Zakharova Cup where her team placed fifth. Individually she placed 10th in the all-around but won silver on vault. Later that month Motak competed at the European Games Test Event where she placed first in the all-around and on vault and fourth on balance beam and floor exercise.

In June Motak competed at the inaugural Junior World Championships. She only qualified to the vault event final where she placed fourth behind American Kayla DiCello, Jennifer Gadirova of Great Britain, and Vladislava Urazova of Russia. She ended the season competing at the European Youth Olympic Festival where she won silver on vault behind Viktoria Listunova of Russia.

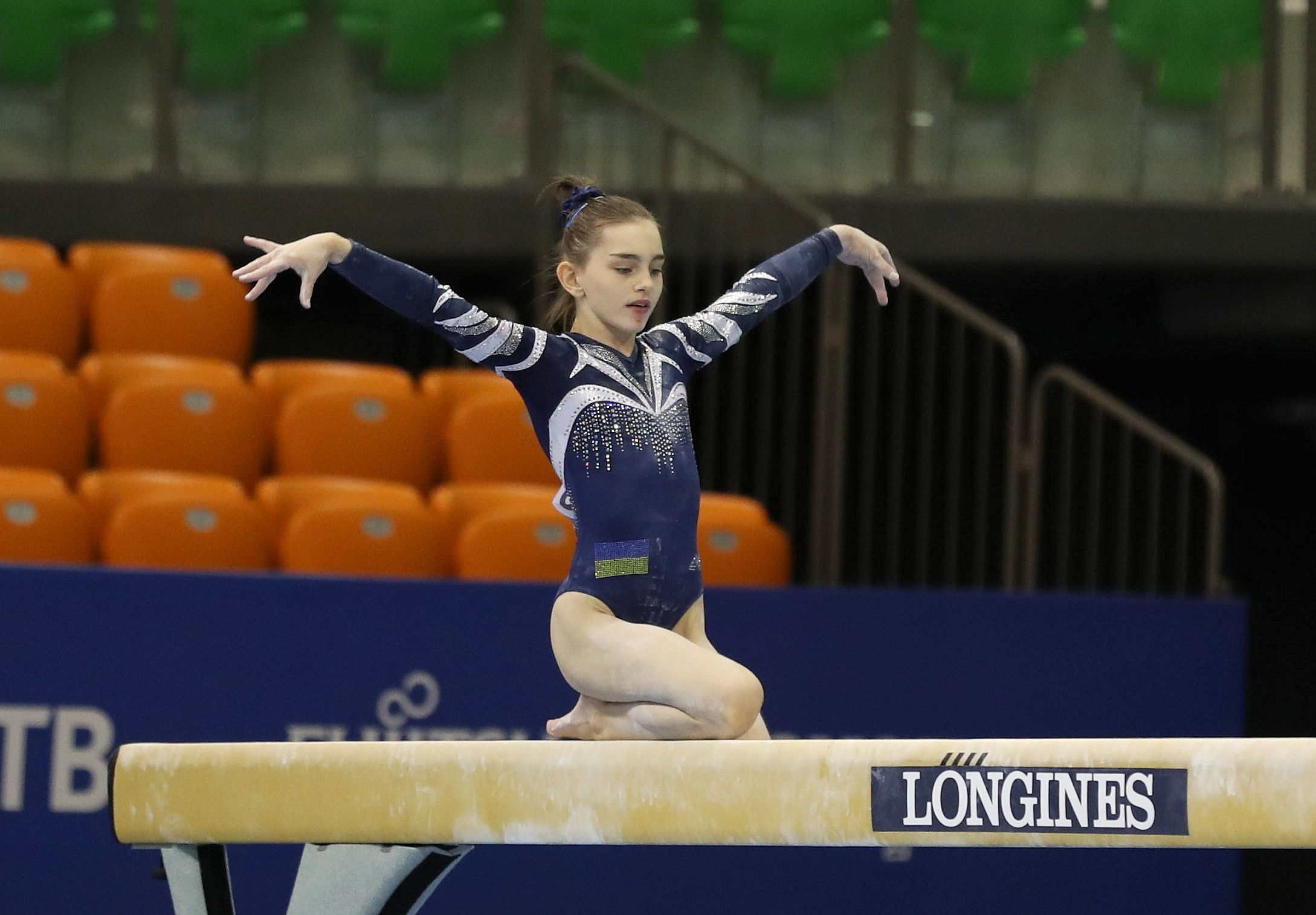
Team / All-Around Final

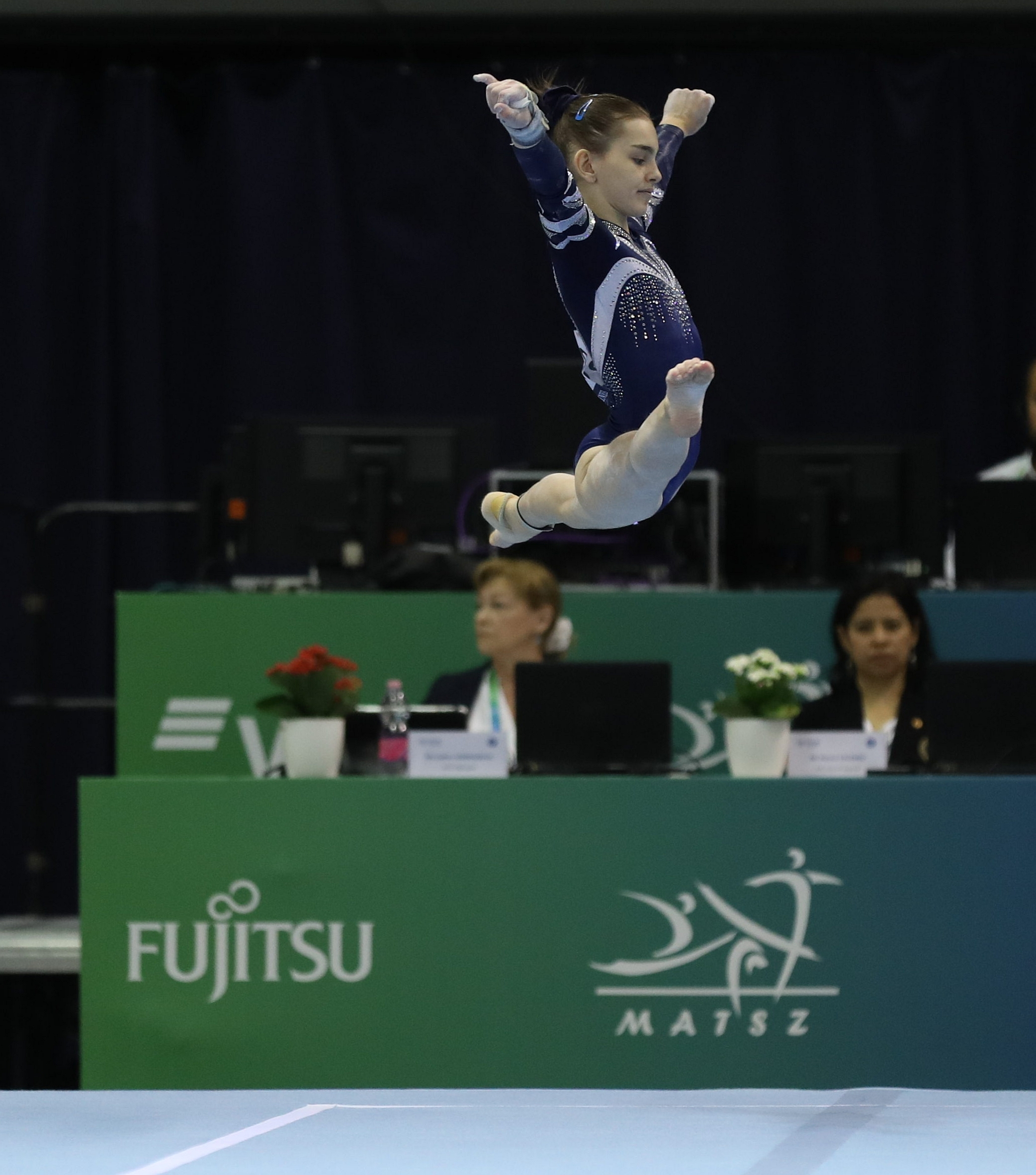
Team / All-Around Final

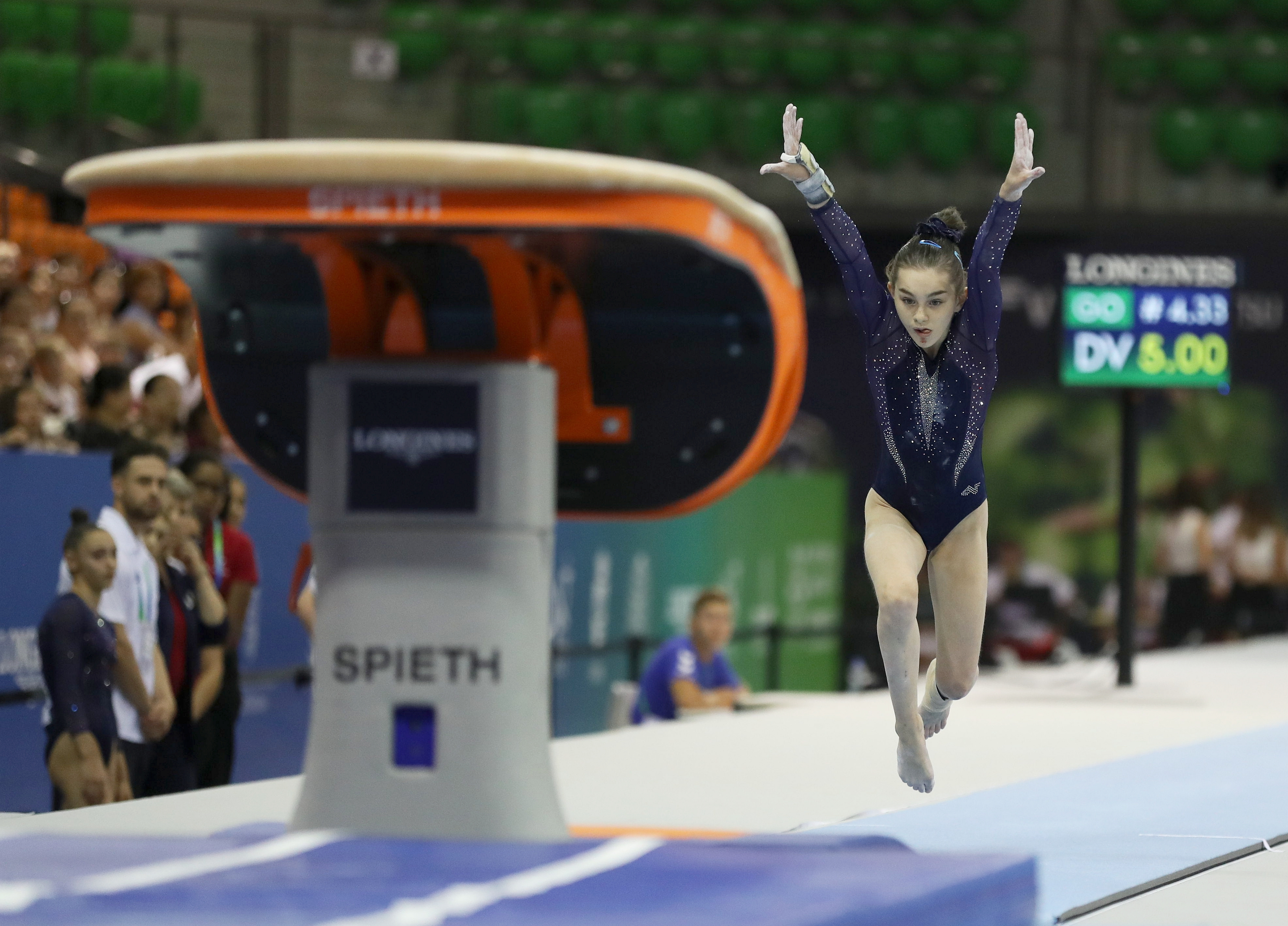
Vault Final

Motak at the 2019 Junior World Championships

=== 2020 ===
Motak became age-eligible for senior competition in 2020. In September Motak competed at the Ukrainian National Championships as a first year senior. She won the all-around and placed first on balance beam and placed second on vault and uneven bars. The following month she competed at the Szombathely Challenge Cup where she won silver on vault behind Hungarian Boglárka Dévai.

In December Motak competed at the European Championships alongside Anastasiia Bachynska, Yelyzaveta Hubareva, Angelina Radivilova, and Diana Varinska. During qualifications she helped Ukraine qualify second to the team final behind Romania, and individually she qualified to the vault, uneven bars, and balance beam finals. During the team final Romania suffered mishaps, and Ukraine won team gold. During event finals Motak won bronze on vault (behind Zsófia Kovács and Larisa Iordache) and on balance beam (behind Iordache and Silviana Sfiringu) and placed fifth on uneven bars.

=== 2021–22 ===
In April Motak competed at the European Championships. She qualified to the vault final and finished in fourth place. In the fall she had moved to Poland where her parents live and competed there at an internal team competition.

Motak was not included on the Ukrainian national team for 2022.

== Competitive history ==
| Year | Event | Team | AA | VT | UB | BB | FX |
Junior
| 2018 | Tournoi International | | 10 | | | | 6 |
| 2019 | Ukrainian Championships | | 3rd place, bronze medalist(s) | | | | |
| 2019 | Stella Zakharova Cup | 5 | 10 | 2nd place, silver medalist(s) | | | |
| 2019 | Euro Games Test Event | | 1st place, gold medalist(s) | 1st place, gold medalist(s) | | 4 | 4 |
| 2019 | Junior World Championships | | | 4 | | | |
| 2019 | Euro Youth Olympic Festival | 10 | | 2nd place, silver medalist(s) | | | |
Senior
| 2020 | Ukrainian Championships | | 1st place, gold medalist(s) | 2nd place, silver medalist(s) | 2nd place, silver medalist(s) | 1st place, gold medalist(s) | |
| 2020 | Szombathely Challenge Cup | | | 2nd place, silver medalist(s) | | | |
| 2020 | European Championships | 1st place, gold medalist(s) | | 3rd place, bronze medalist(s) | 5 | 3rd place, bronze medalist(s) | |
2021
| 2021 | European Championships | | | 4 | | | |
| 2021 | Varna Challenge Cup | | | 8 | | | |
