= Radivilov =

Radivilov (Ukrainian: Радівілов) is a Ukrainian masculine surname, its feminine counterpart is Radivilova. It may refer to

- Angelina Radivilova (born 1991), Ukrainian gymnast
- Ihor Radivilov (born 1992), Ukrainian gymnast, husband of Angelina
