= Derin (given name) =

- Pronunciation: Turkish pronunciation: [deˈɾin]
- Gender: Unisex
- Language: Turkish

Origin
- Origin: Proto-Turkic
- Derivation: derin
- Meaning: Deep
- Region of origin: Turkey

Other names
- Variant forms: Derinsu, Derinnaz, Derinay

Derin is a unisex given name of Turkish origin meaning "deep". Notable people with the name include:

== Etymology ==
The name comes from the Turkish word derin, meaning "deep", which is derived from the Proto-Turkic *teriŋ.

== Given name ==
- Derin Adeyokunnu, Nigerian film producer and director
- Derin Atakan (born 2006), Turkish kitesurfer
- Derin Erdoğan (born 2002), Turkish basketball player
- Derin Ologbenla (died 1894), Nigerian Yoruba royal
- Derin Seale, Australian filmmaker
- Derin Tanrıyaşükür (born 2006), Turkish artistic gymnast
- Derin Young, Australian producer and songwriter
