= Dilara Yurtdaş =

Turkish artistic gymnast (born 2004)

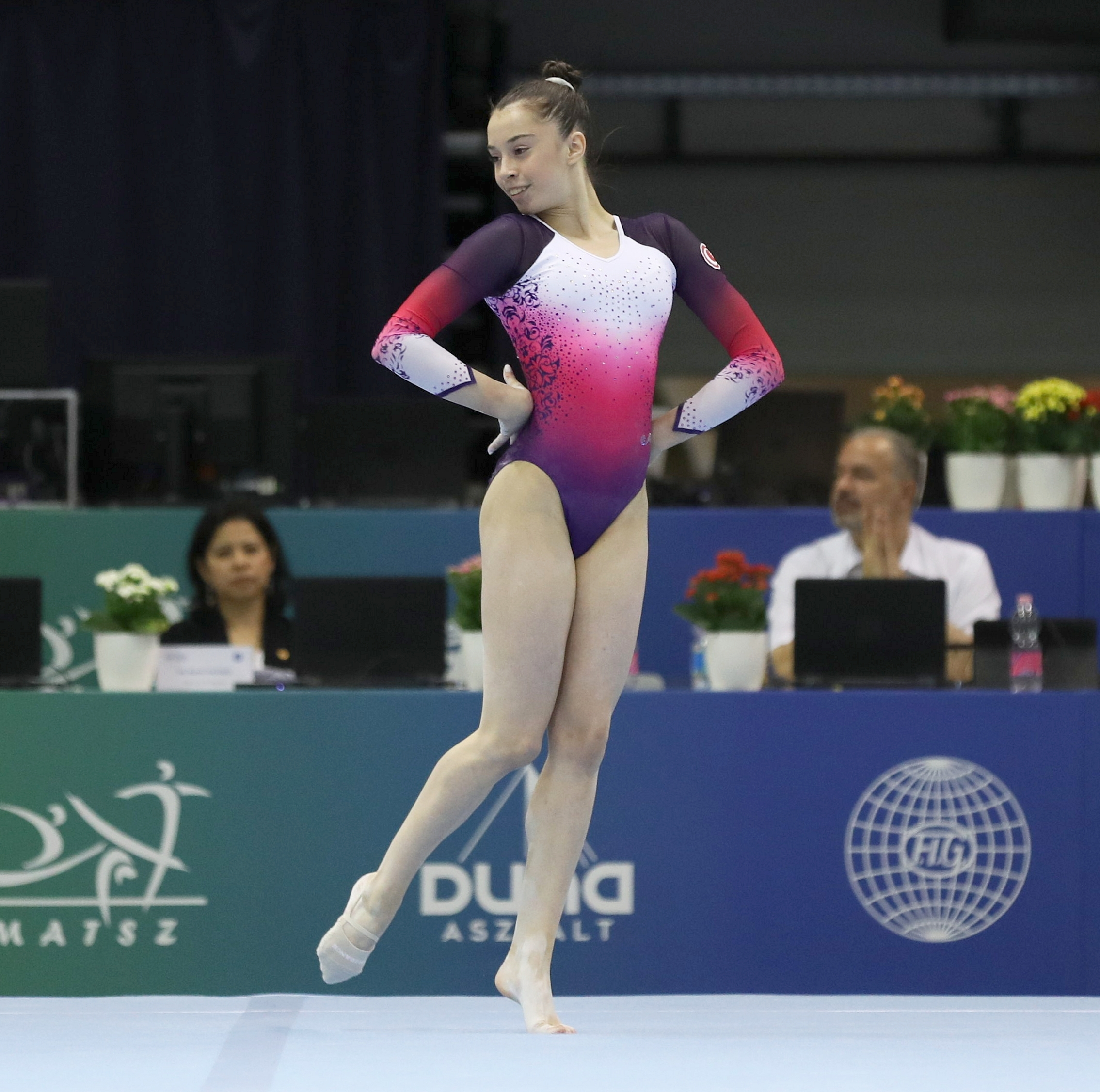
- Yurtdaş at the 2019 Junior World Championships

Personal information
- Born: 2 October 2004 (age 21) Konak, İzmir, Turkey

Gymnastics career
- Discipline: Women's artistic gymnastics
- Country represented: Turkey
- Club: Karşıyaka Belediye GSK
- Head coach: Derya Öner Ağan

Dilara Yurtdaş (born 2 October 2004) is a Turkish former artistic gymnast. She competed at the 2020 European Championships and the 2019 Junior World Championships. She is the 2019 Turkish junior all-around champion.

== Gymnastics career ==
Yurtdaş competed for the Beden Terbiyesi S.K. club in İzmir in 2015, before she transferred to İzmir Karşıyaka Belediye GSK.

=== Junior ===
Yurtdaş finished fourth in the junior all-around at the 2017 Turkish Championships and won the uneven bars silver medal behind Nazlı Savranbaşı. She then placed eighth in the all-around at the 2018 Turkish Championships and won the balance beam title. At the 2018 Gym Festival Trnava in Slovakia, she won a silver medal on the floor exercise. The Turkish team finished 13th at the 2018 Junior European Championships, and Yurtdaş finished 46th in the all-around.

Yurtdaş won the junior all-around title at the 2019 Turkish Championships. At the 2019 Stella Zakharova Cup in Kyiv, Ukraine, she won the bronze medal ion the floor exercise and the silver medal in the all-around, and the silver medal with her teammates. Then at the 2019 Gym Festival Trnava in Slovakia, she won the gold medal on the floor exercise. She then competed at the 2019 Junior World Championships alongside Ceren Biner and Bilge Tarhan, and they finished 21st in the team competition. Yurtdaş placed 43rd in the individual all-around.

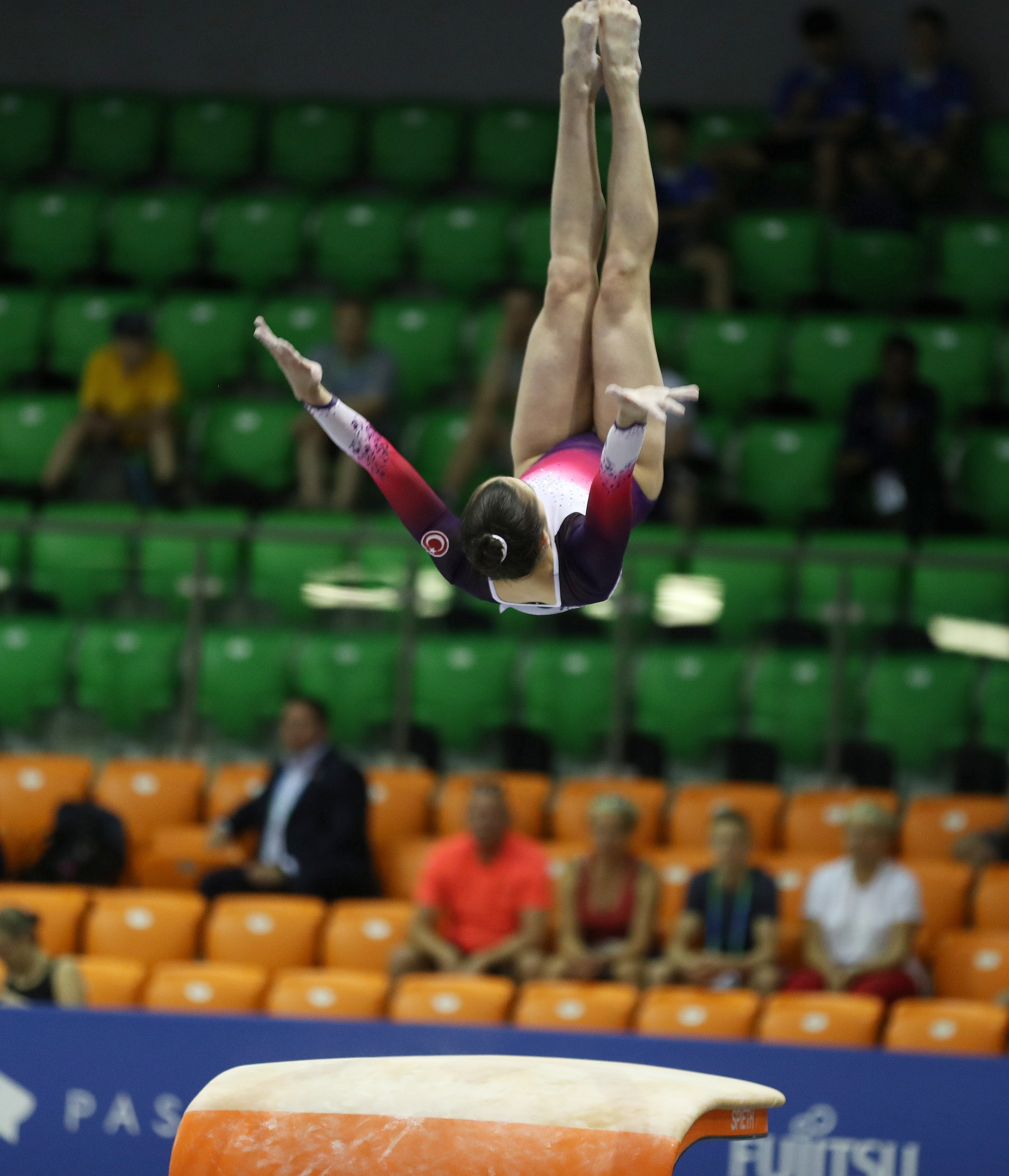
Vault

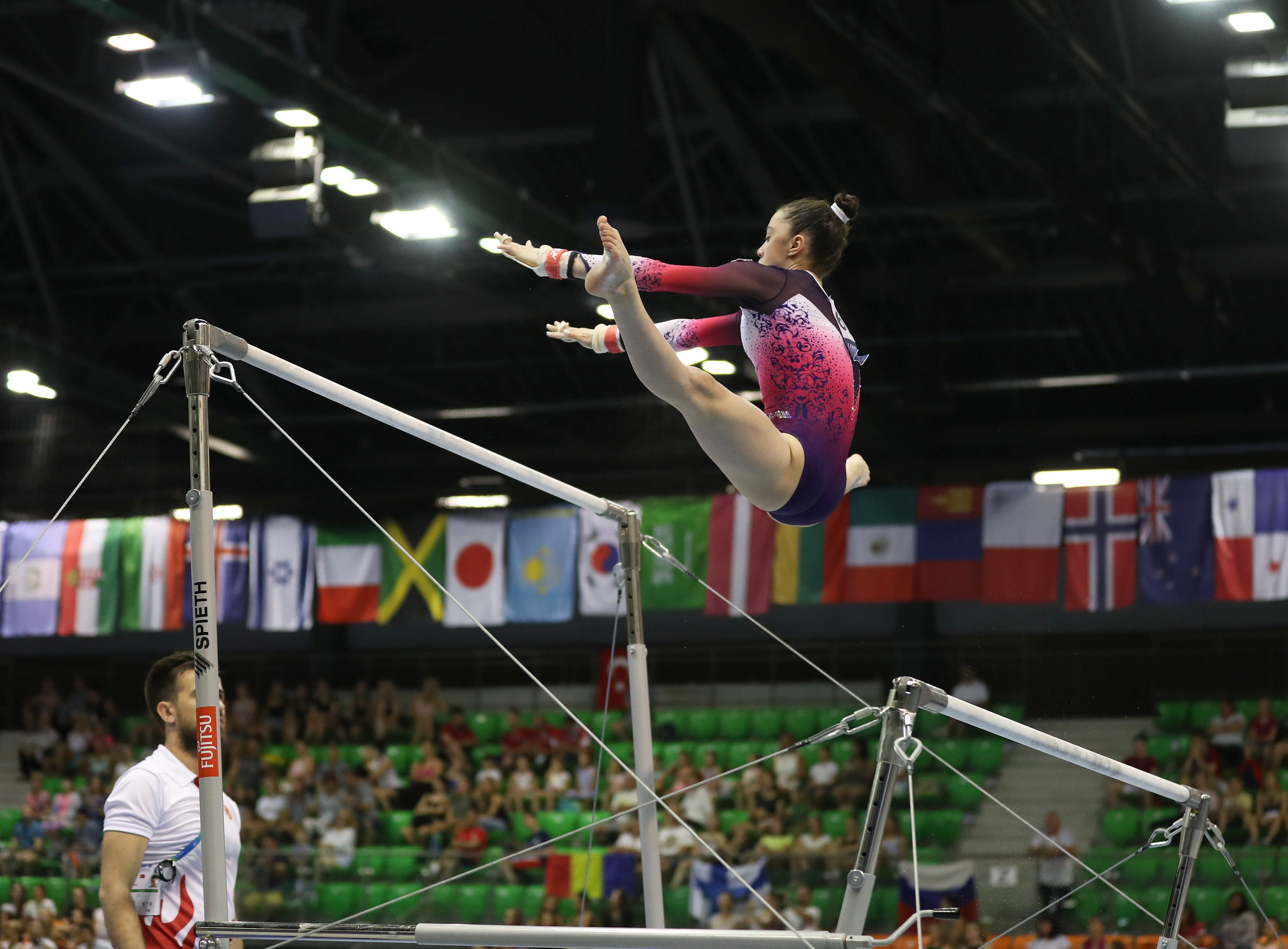
Uneven bars

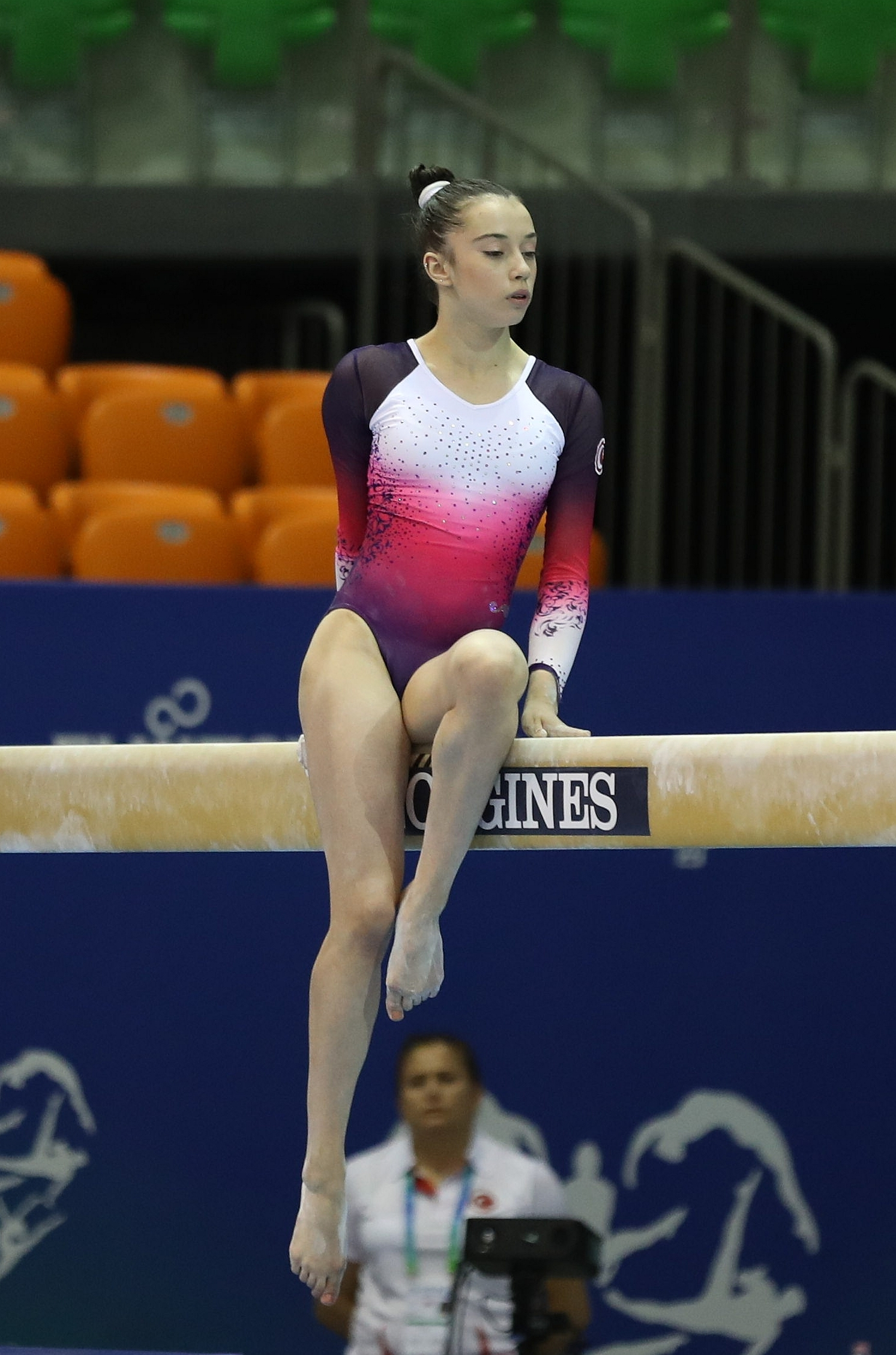
Balance beam

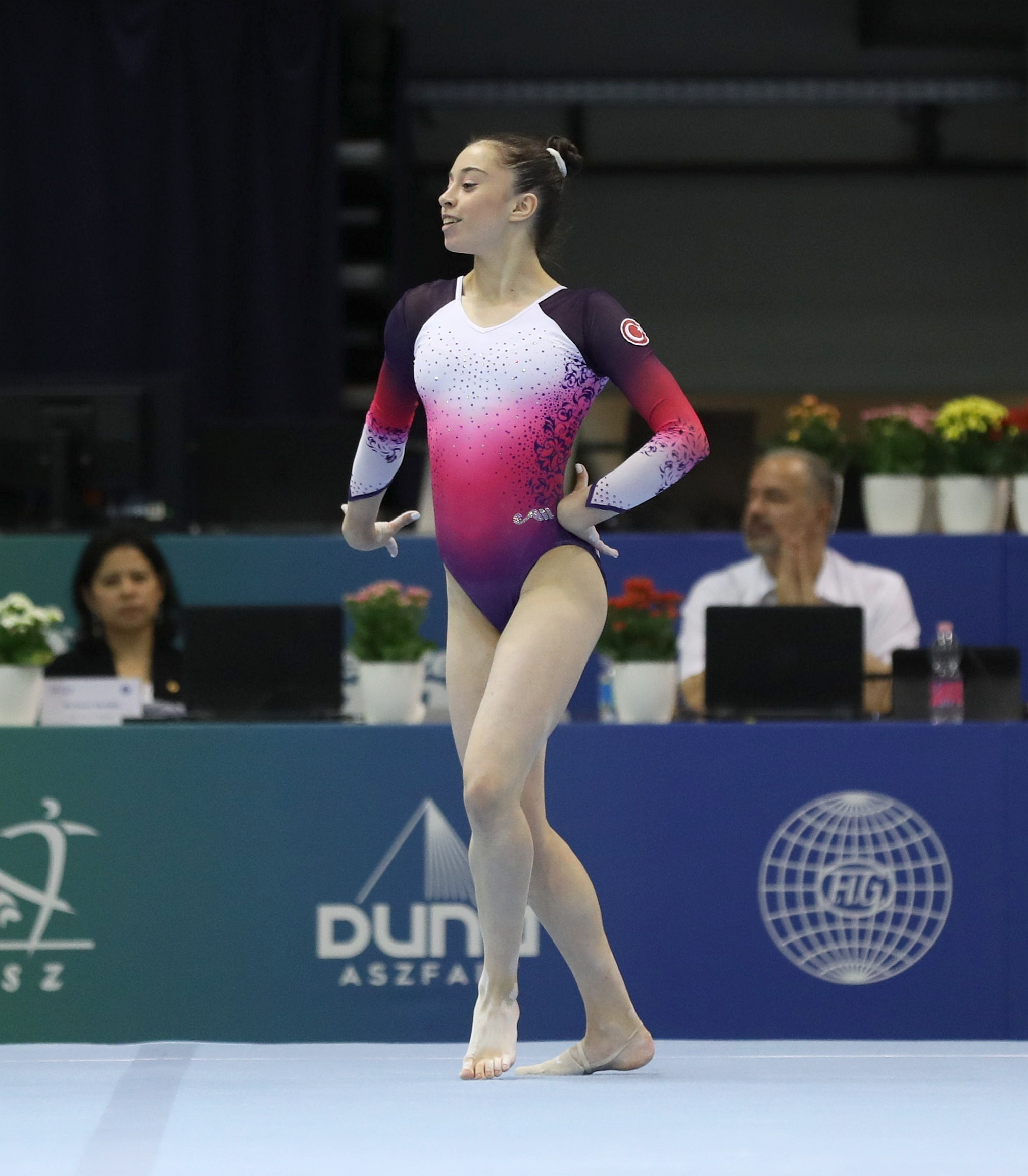
Floor exercise

Yurtdaş at the 2019 Junior World Championships

Yurtdaş competed at the 2019 European Youth Olympic Festival with the Turkish team that finished 18th. At the 2019 Mediterranean Championships in Cagliari, Italy, she won the bronze medal in the all-around and silver medals in the balance beam, floor exercise, and team events.

=== Senior ===
Yurtdaş became age-eligible for senior competitions in 2020. At the 2020 Turkish Championships, she won the all-around silver medal behind Nazlı Savranbaşı. She competed at the 2020 European Championships alongside Cemre Kendirci, Göksu Üçtaş Şanlı, Ece Yağmur Yavuz, and Bilge Tarhan, and they finished fourth in the team final. Individually, she qualified for the vault final and finished sixth. She only competed on the uneven bars at the 2021 Turkish Championships and won the gold medal. This was the final competition of her career.
