= 2020 European Women's Artistic Gymnastics Championships =

- Venue: Mersin Gymnastics Hall
- Location: Mersin, Turkey
- Start date: 17 December 2020
- End date: 20 December 2020
- Competitors: 90 (46 senior & 44 junior) from 15 nations

The 33rd European Women's Artistic Gymnastics Championships were held from 17 to 20 December 2020 in Mersin, Turkey. The competition was originally scheduled to be held from 30 April to 3 May 2020 in Paris, France, but it was rescheduled due to the COVID-19 pandemic. Baku, Azerbaijan was announced as the replacement host for 17 to 20 December, before the event was relocated to Mersin. Originally an Olympic qualifying event, the competition was undesignated as such in light of the ongoing pandemic, so as to avoid pressuring member federations to attend if they were not willing to do so.

Only 15 nations opted to send athletes, as the majority of countries withdrew out of concerns regarding the COVID-19 pandemic in Europe and for this reason, this edition of the European Artistic Gymnastics Championships is informally referred to by many as the 'Fake Euros'. European Gymnastics barred the Polish Gymnastics Federation from sending any athletes due to outstanding financial obligations resulting from their hosting the 2019 edition of the event.

== Schedule ==
| Date | Session | Time | Subdivisions |
|---|---|---|---|
| Thursday, 17 December | Opening Ceremony | 14:00 – 14:30 | – |
| Thursday, 17 December | Senior Qualification for Team & Individual Apparatus Finals | 14:45 – 16:25 | Subdivision 1 |
| Thursday, 17 December | Senior Qualification for Team & Individual Apparatus Finals | 16:45 – 18:25 | Subdivision 2 |
| Friday, 18 December | Junior Team & All-Around Finals and Qualification for Individual Apparatus Finals | 14:00 – 15:40 | Subdivision 1 |
| Friday, 18 December | Junior Team & All-Around Finals and Qualification for Individual Apparatus Finals | 16:00 – 17:40 | Subdivision 2 |
| Saturday, 19 December | Senior Team Final | 15:30 – 17:30 | Top 6 from qualifications |
| Sunday, 20 December | Junior Individual Apparatus Finals | 10:00 – 13:00 | Vault, Uneven bars, Balance beam, Floor |
| Sunday, 20 December | Senior Individual Apparatus Finals | 15:00 – 17:45 | Vault, Uneven bars, Balance beam, Floor |
All times listed in local time (UTC+03:00).

== Medals summary ==
=== Medalists ===
| Event | Gold | Silver | Bronze |
Senior
| Team | Ukraine; Anastasiia Bachynska; Yelyzaveta Hubareva; Anastasiia Motak; Angelina Radivilova; Diana Varinska | Romania; Antonia Duță; Larisa Iordache; Silviana Sfiringu; Ioana Stănciulescu; Daniela Trică | Hungary; Csenge Bácskay; Dorina Böczögő; Zsófia Kovács; Mirtill Makovits; Zója Székely |
| Vault | (Hungary) Zsófia Kovács | (Romania) Larisa Iordache | (Ukraine) Anastasiia Motak |
| Uneven bars | (Hungary) Zsófia Kovács | (Hungary) Zója Székely | (Slovakia) Barbora Mokošová |
| Balance beam | (Romania) Larisa Iordache | (Romania) Silviana Sfiringu | (Ukraine) Anastasiia Motak |
| Floor | (Romania) Larisa Iordache | (Turkey) Göksu Üçtaş Şanlı | (Israel) Lihie Raz |
Junior
| Team | Romania; Ana Bărbosu; Maria Ceplinschi; Andreea Preda; Iulia Trestianu; Ana Turcu | Ukraine; Daniela Batrona; Viktoriia Ivanenko; Yuliia Kasianenko; Daria Lyska | Hungary; Kira Balázs; Flora Beke; Gréta Mayer; Nóra Peresztegi; Anna Szmirnov |
| All-around | (Romania) Ana Bărbosu | (Romania) Maria Ceplinschi | (Ukraine) Daniela Batrona |
| Vault | (Romania) Ana Bărbosu | (Bulgaria) Valentina Georgieva | (Ukraine) Daria Lyska |
| Uneven bars | (Romania) Ana Bărbosu | (Croatia) Sara Šulekić | (Turkey) Derin Tanrıyaşükür |
| Balance beam | (Romania) Ana Bărbosu | (Hungary) Gréta Mayer | (Romania) Andreea Preda |
| Floor | (Romania) Ana Bărbosu | (Romania) Maria Ceplinschi | (Hungary) Gréta Mayer |

=== Medal standings ===
==== Overall ====
* Host nation (Turkey)

| Rank | Nation | Gold | Silver | Bronze | Total |
|---|---|---|---|---|---|
| 1 | Romania (ROU) | 8 | 5 | 1 | 14 |
| 2 | Hungary (HUN) | 2 | 2 | 3 | 7 |
| 3 | Ukraine (UKR) | 1 | 1 | 4 | 6 |
| 4 | Turkey (TUR)* | 0 | 1 | 1 | 2 |
| 5 | Bulgaria (BUL) | 0 | 1 | 0 | 1 |
| 5 | Croatia (CRO) | 0 | 1 | 0 | 1 |
| 7 | Israel (ISR) | 0 | 0 | 1 | 1 |
| 7 | Slovakia (SVK) | 0 | 0 | 1 | 1 |
| Totals (8 entries) | | 11 | 11 | 11 | 33 |

==== Senior ====
* Host nation (Turkey)

| Rank | Nation | Gold | Silver | Bronze | Total |
|---|---|---|---|---|---|
| 1 | Romania (ROU) | 2 | 3 | 0 | 5 |
| 2 | Hungary (HUN) | 2 | 1 | 1 | 4 |
| 3 | Ukraine (UKR) | 1 | 0 | 2 | 3 |
| 4 | Turkey (TUR)* | 0 | 1 | 0 | 1 |
| 5 | Israel (ISR) | 0 | 0 | 1 | 1 |
| 5 | Slovakia (SVK) | 0 | 0 | 1 | 1 |
| Totals (6 entries) | | 5 | 5 | 5 | 15 |

==== Junior ====
* Host nation (Turkey)

| Rank | Nation | Gold | Silver | Bronze | Total |
|---|---|---|---|---|---|
| 1 | Romania (ROU) | 6 | 2 | 1 | 9 |
| 2 | Hungary (HUN) | 0 | 1 | 2 | 3 |
| 2 | Ukraine (UKR) | 0 | 1 | 2 | 3 |
| 4 | Bulgaria (BUL) | 0 | 1 | 0 | 1 |
| 4 | Croatia (CRO) | 0 | 1 | 0 | 1 |
| 6 | Turkey (TUR)* | 0 | 0 | 1 | 1 |
| Totals (6 entries) | | 6 | 6 | 6 | 18 |

== Senior results ==
=== Team competition ===
Only six teams advanced to the team final rather than the traditional eight. Ukraine won its first-ever team title, while qualification leader Romania faltered to score five points lower than in qualifications and narrowly finish in second. Hungary's bronze medal is the nation's first in the team event.

Oldest and youngest competitors

| | Name | Country | Date of birth | Age |
|---|---|---|---|---|
| Youngest | Anastasiia Motak | Ukraine | 12 November 2004 | 16 years, 1 month and 7 days |
| Oldest | Tijana Korent | Croatia | 27 April 1989 | 31 years, 7 months and 22 days |

| Rank | Team | Vault (gymnastics) | Uneven bars | Balance beam | Floor (gymnastics) | Total |
|---|---|---|---|---|---|---|
| 1st place, gold medalist(s) | Ukraine | 40.866 (2) | 39.099 (2) | 37.066 (2) | 37.632 (2) | 154.663 |
| 1st place, gold medalist(s) | Anastasiia Bachynska | 13.533 | 12.833 | 12.700 | | 154.663 |
| 1st place, gold medalist(s) | Yelyzaveta Hubareva | 13.333 | | | 12.533 | 154.663 |
| 1st place, gold medalist(s) | Anastasiia Motak | 14.000 | 13.033 | 11.833 | | 154.663 |
| 1st place, gold medalist(s) | Angelina Radivilova | | | | 12.633 | 154.663 |
| 1st place, gold medalist(s) | Diana Varinska | | 13.233 | 12.533 | 12.466 | 154.663 |
| 2nd place, silver medalist(s) | Romania | 41.866 (1) | 35.066 (3) | 38.965 (1) | 38.599 (1) | 154.496 |
| 2nd place, silver medalist(s) | Antonia Duță | | | | 12.800 | 154.496 |
| 2nd place, silver medalist(s) | Larisa Iordache | 14.166 | 13.100 | 14.133 | 12.766 | 154.496 |
| 2nd place, silver medalist(s) | Silviana Sfiringu | 14.200 | 12.166 | 12.366 | | 154.496 |
| 2nd place, silver medalist(s) | Ioana Stănciulescu | 13.500 | 9.800 | | 13.033 | 154.496 |
| 2nd place, silver medalist(s) | Daniela Trică | | | 12.466 | | 154.496 |
| 3rd place, bronze medalist(s) | Hungary | 40.800 (3) | 40.466 (1) | 34.466 (4) | 35.865 (4) | 151.597 |
| 3rd place, bronze medalist(s) | Csenge Bácskay | 13.300 | | 10.700 | | 151.597 |
| 3rd place, bronze medalist(s) | Dorina Böczögő | 13.300 | | | 12.666 | 151.597 |
| 3rd place, bronze medalist(s) | Zsófia Kovács | 14.200 | 14.200 | 12.533 | | 151.597 |
| 3rd place, bronze medalist(s) | Mirtill Makovits | | 12.866 | 11.233 | 11.033 | 151.597 |
| 3rd place, bronze medalist(s) | Zója Székely | | 13.400 | | 12.166 | 151.597 |
| 4 | Turkey | 38.532 (5) | 34.465 (4) | 34.699 (3) | 36.099 (3) | 143.975 |
| 4 | Cemre Kendirci | | 10.566 | 10.833 | 12.033 | 143.975 |
| 4 | Bilge Tarhan | 13.266 | 11.733 | 12.100 | 12.033 | 143.975 |
| 4 | Göksu Üçtaş Şanlı | | | 11.766 | 12.033 | 143.975 |
| 4 | Ece Yağmur Yavuz | 11.800 | | | | 143.975 |
| 4 | Dilara Yurtdaş | 13.466 | 12.166 | | | 143.975 |
| 5 | Czech Republic | 39.266 (4) | 34.233 (5) | 32.499 (6) | 34.532 (5) | 140.530 |
| 5 | Natálie Brabcová | | | | | 140.530 |
| 5 | Magdalena Coufalová | 12.966 | | | 11.466 | 140.530 |
| 5 | Sabina Hálová | | 11.433 | 9.533 | | 140.530 |
| 5 | Aneta Holasová | 13.200 | 11.600 | 11.466 | 11.833 | 140.530 |
| 5 | Dominika Ponížilová | 13.100 | 11.200 | 11.500 | 11.233 | 140.530 |
| 6 | Croatia | 37.899 (6) | 30.299 (6) | 34.065 (5) | 34.499 (6) | 136.732 |
| 6 | Ana Đerek | | | 12.066 | 11.166 | 136.732 |
| 6 | Petra Furač | 12.733 | 10.466 | 10.833 | 11.433 | 136.732 |
| 6 | Tijana Korent | 13.033 | | | | 136.732 |
| 6 | Tina Zelčić | | 8.400 | | | 136.732 |
| 6 | Christina Zwicker | 12.133 | 11.433 | 11.166 | 11.900 | 136.732 |

=== Vault ===
Oldest and youngest competitors

| | Name | Country | Date of birth | Age |
|---|---|---|---|---|
| Youngest | Anastasiia Motak | Ukraine | 12 November 2004 | 16 years, 1 month and 8 days |
| Oldest | Tijana Korent | Croatia | 27 April 1989 | 31 years, 7 months and 23 days |

| Position | Gymnast | Vault 1 | | | | Vault 2 | | | | Total |
| Position | Gymnast | D Score | E Score | Pen. | Score 1 | D Score | E Score | Pen. | Score 2 | Total |
|---|---|---|---|---|---|---|---|---|---|---|
| 1st place, gold medalist(s) | (Hungary) Zsófia Kóvacs | 5.4 | 8.950 | | 14.350 | 4.8 | 8.950 | | 13.750 | 14.050 |
| 2nd place, silver medalist(s) | (Romania) Larisa Iordache | 5.4 | 8.800 | | 14.200 | 4.8 | 8.750 | | 13.550 | 13.875 |
| 3rd place, bronze medalist(s) | (Ukraine) Anastasiia Motak | 5.4 | 8.850 | | 14.250 | 4.8 | 8.650 | | 13.450 | 13.850 |
| 4 | (Hungary) Csenge Bácksay | 5.0 | 8.700 | | 13.700 | 4.8 | 8.800 | | 13.600 | 13.650 |
| 5 | (Romania) Ioana Stănciulescu | 5.4 | 8.750 | | 14.150 | 4.2 | 8.800 | | 13.000 | 13.575 |
| 6 | (Turkey) Dilara Yurtdaş | 4.6 | 9.000 | | 13.600 | 4.6 | 8.750 | | 13.350 | 13.475 |
| 7 | (Latvia) Elina Vihrova | 4.6 | 8.800 | | 13.400 | 4.6 | 8.500 | | 13.100 | 13.250 |
| 8 | (Croatia) Tijana Korent | 4.6 | 8.600 | | 13.200 | 4.6 | 8.650 | | 13.250 | 13.225 |

=== Uneven bars ===
Oldest and youngest competitors

| | Name | Country | Date of birth | Age |
|---|---|---|---|---|
| Youngest | Anastasiia Motak | Ukraine | 12 November 2004 | 16 years, 1 month and 8 days |
| Oldest | Larisa Iordache | Romania | 19 June 1996 | 24 years, 6 months and 1 day |

| Position | Gymnast | D Score | E Score | Penalty | Total |
|---|---|---|---|---|---|
| 1st place, gold medalist(s) | (Hungary) Zsófia Kóvacs | 5.7 | 8.150 | | 13.850 |
| 2nd place, silver medalist(s) | (Hungary) Zója Székely | 5.8 | 7.750 | | 13.550 |
| 3rd place, bronze medalist(s) | (Slovakia) Barbora Mokošová | 5.5 | 7.800 | | 13.300 |
| 4 | (Romania) Larisa Iordache | 5.5 | 7.750 | | 13.250 |
| 5 | (Ukraine) Anastasiia Motak | 5.7 | 7.550 | | 13.250 |
| 6 | (Croatia) Christina Zwicker | 4.4 | 8.150 | | 12.550 |
| 7 | (Ukraine) Yelyzaveta Hubareva | 5.5 | 6.850 | | 12.350 |
| 8 | (Latvia) Elina Vihrova | 5.0 | 6.350 | | 11.350 |

=== Balance beam ===
Oldest and youngest competitors

| | Name | Country | Date of birth | Age |
|---|---|---|---|---|
| Youngest | Anastasiia Motak | Ukraine | 12 November 2004 | 16 years, 1 month and 8 days |
| Oldest | Elisa Hämmerle | Austria | 10 December 1995 | 25 years and 10 days |

| Position | Gymnast | D Score | E Score | Penalty | Total |
|---|---|---|---|---|---|
| 1st place, gold medalist(s) | (Romania) Larisa Iordache | 6.0 | 8.000 | | 14.000 |
| 2nd place, silver medalist(s) | (Romania) Silviana Sfiringu | 6.0 | 7.800 | | 13.800 |
| 3rd place, bronze medalist(s) | (Ukraine) Anastasiia Motak | 5.8 | 7.400 | 0.100 | 13.100 |
| 4 | (Ukraine) Anastasiia Bachynska | 5.7 | 7.400 | | 13.100 |
| 5 | (Latvia) Elina Vihrova | 5.2 | 7.550 | | 12.750 |
| 6 | (Turkey) Bilge Tarhan | 5.1 | 7.550 | | 12.650 |
| 7 | (Croatia) Christina Zwicker | 4.7 | 7.400 | | 12.100 |
| 8 | (Austria) Elisa Hämmerle | 4.3 | 5.600 | | 9.900 |

=== Floor ===
Oldest and youngest competitors

| | Name | Country | Date of birth | Age |
|---|---|---|---|---|
| Youngest | Antonia Duță | Romania | 8 October 2004 | 16 years, 2 months and 12 days |
| Oldest | Göksu Üçtaş Şanlı | Turkey | 30 August 1990 | 30 years, 3 months and 20 days |

| Position | Gymnast | D Score | E Score | Penalty | Total |
|---|---|---|---|---|---|
| 1st place, gold medalist(s) | (Romania) Larisa Iordache | 5.6 | 7.850 | | 13.450 |
| 2nd place, silver medalist(s) | (Turkey) Göksu Üçtaş Şanlı | 4.8 | 8.300 | | 13.100 |
| 3rd place, bronze medalist(s) | (Israel) Lihie Raz | 4.9 | 7.850 | | 12.750 |
| 4 | (Ukraine) Diana Varinska | 4.7 | 7.950 | | 12.650 |
| 5 | (Romania) Antonia Duță | 4.9 | 7.800 | 0.100 | 12.600 |
| 6 | (Ukraine) Angelina Radivilova | 5.0 | 7.600 | | 12.600 |
| 7 | (Hungary) Zója Székely | 4.4 | 8.100 | 0.300 | 12.200 |
| 8 | (Hungary) Dorina Böczögő | 4.9 | 7.200 | | 12.100 |

== Junior results ==
=== Team competition ===
| Rank | Team | Vault (gymnastics) | Uneven bars | Balance beam | Floor (gymnastics) | Total |
|---|---|---|---|---|---|---|
| 1st place, gold medalist(s) | Romania | 41.466 (1) | 37.266 (1) | 37.699 (1) | 40.032 (1) | 156.643 |
| 1st place, gold medalist(s) | Ana Bărbosu | 14.400 | 13.433 | 13.033 | 13.733 | 156.643 |
| 1st place, gold medalist(s) | Maria Ceplinschi | 13.633 | 11.900 | 11.800 | 13.166 | 156.643 |
| 1st place, gold medalist(s) | Andreea Preda | 13.266 | | 12.866 | 13.133 | 156.643 |
| 1st place, gold medalist(s) | Iulia Trestianu | 13.433 | 11.933 | 11.800 | 12.700 | 156.643 |
| 1st place, gold medalist(s) | Ana Turcu | | | | | 156.643 |
| 2nd place, silver medalist(s) | Ukraine | 40.232 (2) | 33.332 (5) | 35.199 (2) | 37.232 (2) | 145.995 |
| 2nd place, silver medalist(s) | Daniela Batrona | 13.366 | 12.133 | 11.633 | 12.700 | 145.995 |
| 2nd place, silver medalist(s) | Viktoriia Ivanenko | 13.000 | 9.833 | 9.333 | 11.666 | 145.995 |
| 2nd place, silver medalist(s) | Yuliia Kasianenko | 12.933 | 9.600 | 11.833 | 12.066 | 145.995 |
| 2nd place, silver medalist(s) | Daria Lyska | 13.866 | 11.366 | 11.733 | 12.466 | 145.995 |
| 3rd place, bronze medalist(s) | Hungary | 38.166 (5) | 34.932 (3) | 34.165 (5) | 36.165 (3) | 143.428 |
| 3rd place, bronze medalist(s) | Kira Balázs | 13.433 | 11.566 | 11.366 | 11.666 | 143.428 |
| 3rd place, bronze medalist(s) | Flora Beke | | 11.300 | 11.066 | | 143.428 |
| 3rd place, bronze medalist(s) | Gréta Mayer | 12.933 | 9.366 | 11.733 | 12.933 | 143.428 |
| 3rd place, bronze medalist(s) | Nóra Peresztegi | | | | 11.566 | 143.428 |
| 3rd place, bronze medalist(s) | Anna Szmirnov | 11.800 | 12.066 | 10.200 | 10.400 | 143.428 |
| 4 | Turkey | 38.232 (4) | 35.232 (2) | 34.265 (4) | 34.265 (7) | 141.994 |
| 4 | Sevgi Kayışoğlu | 12.733 | 11.000 | 12.266 | 11.366 | 141.994 |
| 4 | Beyza Özen | 13.033 | 11.733 | 8.933 | | 141.994 |
| 4 | Kardelen Paryaz | | | | 11.266 | 141.994 |
| 4 | Derin Tanrıyaşükür | 12.366 | 11.866 | 10.933 | 11.133 | 141.994 |
| 4 | Bengisu Yıldız | 12.466 | 11.633 | 11.066 | 11.633 | 141.994 |
| 5 | Croatia | 39.166 (3) | 34.766 (4) | 31.966 (7) | 36.065 (4) | 141.963 |
| 5 | Antea Ercegović | 13.200 | | | 11.833 | 141.963 |
| 5 | Nika Kukuljan Frleta | 11.933 | 12.133 | 9.500 | 11.966 | 141.963 |
| 5 | Emi Matoščević | | 9.833 | 10.433 | | 141.963 |
| 5 | Katarina Strinić | 12.700 | 10.233 | 10.933 | 11.366 | 141.963 |
| 5 | Sara Šulekić | 13.266 | 12.400 | 10.600 | 12.266 | 141.963 |
| 6 | Czech Republic | 37.365 (7) | 33.132 (6) | 34.899 (3) | 35.333 (5) | 140.729 |
| 6 | Nela Tereza Kaplanová | 12.966 | | | 11.700 | 140.729 |
| 6 | Lucie Maříková | 12.233 | 10.566 | 11.666 | 10.533 | 140.729 |
| 6 | Sára Procházková | | 10.566 | 9.800 | | 140.729 |
| 6 | Nela Štěpandová | 11.966 | 11.300 | 11.600 | 12.233 | 140.729 |
| 6 | Lucie Trnková | 12.166 | 11.266 | 11.633 | 11.400 | 140.729 |
| 7 | Slovenia | 37.899 (6) | 28.499 (7) | 32.432 (6) | 34.000 (8) | 132.830 |
| 7 | Živa Konič | 12.233 | 10.100 | 10.133 | 10.800 | 132.830 |
| 7 | Lea Koren | 12.133 | 8.866 | 10.766 | | 132.830 |
| 7 | Tia Pavlin Zakovšek | 11.800 | 8.600 | 11.033 | 11.000 | 132.830 |
| 7 | Zala Trtnik | 13.533 | 9.533 | 10.633 | 12.200 | 132.830 |
| 8 | Bulgaria | 36.566 (8) | 27.700 (8) | 30.065 (8) | 34.732 (6) | 129.063 |
| 8 | Viktoria Chakova | 11.633 | 8.000 | 10.533 | 11.533 | 129.063 |
| 8 | Valentina Georgieva | 12.533 | 10.800 | 9.966 | 11.633 | 129.063 |
| 8 | Viktoria Glavtcheva | 12.400 | 8.900 | 9.566 | 11.566 | 129.063 |
| 8 | Darina Nachina | 11.166 | | 8.600 | 10.700 | 129.063 |

=== Individual all-around ===
| Position | Gymnast | Vault (gymnastics) | Uneven bars | Balance beam | Floor (gymnastics) | Total |
|---|---|---|---|---|---|---|
| 1st place, gold medalist(s) | (Romania) Ana Bărbosu | 14.400 | 13.433 | 13.033 | 13.733 | 54.599 |
| 2nd place, silver medalist(s) | (Romania) Maria Ceplinschi | 13.633 | 11.900 | 11.800 | 13.166 | 50.499 |
| – | (Romania) Iulia Trestianu | 13.433 | 11.933 | 11.800 | 12.700 | 49.866 |
| 3rd place, bronze medalist(s) | (Ukraine) Daniela Batrona | 13.366 | 12.133 | 11.633 | 12.700 | 49.832 |
| 4 | (Ukraine) Daria Lyska | 13.866 | 11.366 | 11.733 | 12.466 | 49.431 |
| 5 | (Croatia) Sara Šulekić | 13.266 | 12.400 | 10.600 | 12.266 | 48.532 |
| 6 | (Hungary) Kira Balázs | 13.433 | 11.566 | 11.366 | 11.666 | 48.031 |
| 7 | (Turkey) Sevgi Kayışoğlu | 12.733 | 11.000 | 12.266 | 11.366 | 47.365 |
| 8 | (Czech Republic) Nela Štěpandová | 11.966 | 11.300 | 11.600 | 12.233 | 47.099 |
| 9 | (Hungary) Gréta Mayer | 12.933 | 9.366 | 11.733 | 12.933 | 46.965 |
| 10 | (Turkey) Bengisu Yıldız | 12.466 | 11.633 | 11.066 | 11.633 | 46.798 |
| 11 | (Czech Republic) Lucie Trnková | 12.166 | 11.266 | 11.633 | 11.400 | 46.465 |
| – | (Ukraine) Yuliia Kasianenko | 12.933 | 9.600 | 11.833 | 12.066 | 46.432 |
| – | (Turkey) Derin Tanrıyaşükür | 12.366 | 11.866 | 10.933 | 11.133 | 46.298 |
| 12 | (Slovenia) Zala Trtnik | 13.533 | 9.533 | 10.633 | 12.200 | 45.899 |
| 13 | (Croatia) Nika Kukuljan Frleta | 11.933 | 12.133 | 9.500 | 11.966 | 45.532 |
| – | (Croatia) Katarina Strinić | 12.700 | 10.233 | 10.933 | 11.366 | 45.232 |
| – | (Czech Republic) Lucie Maříková | 12.233 | 10.566 | 11.666 | 10.533 | 44.998 |
| 14 | (Bulgaria) Valentina Georgieva | 12.533 | 10.800 | 9.966 | 11.633 | 44.932 |
| – | (Hungary) Anna Szmirnov | 11.800 | 12.066 | 10.200 | 10.400 | 44.466 |
| 15 | (Latvia) Anastasija Ananjeva | 12.466 | 9.200 | 11.033 | 11.433 | 44.132 |
| 16 | (Malta) Tara Vella Clark | 12.266 | 8.066 | 12.200 | 11.500 | 44.032 |
| – | (Ukraine) Viktoriia Ivanenko | 13.000 | 9.833 | 9.333 | 11.666 | 43.832 |
| 17 | (Slovenia) Živa Konič | 12.233 | 10.100 | 10.133 | 10.800 | 43.266 |
| – | (Slovenia) Tia Pavlin Zakovšek | 11.800 | 8.600 | 11.033 | 11.000 | 42.433 |
| 18 | (Bulgaria) Viktoria Glavtcheva | 12.400 | 8.900 | 9.566 | 11.566 | 42.432 |
| – | (Bulgaria) Viktoria Chakova | 11.633 | 8.000 | 10.533 | 11.533 | 41.699 |
| 19 | (Azerbaijan) Milana Minakovskaya | 12.066 | 7.466 | 7.866 | 11.400 | 38.798 |
| 20 | (Latvia) Marija Protasenko | 10.866 | 7.600 | 9.933 | 9.533 | 37.932 |

=== Vault ===
| Position | Gymnast | Vault 1 | | | | Vault 2 | | | | Total |
| Position | Gymnast | D Score | E Score | Pen. | Score 1 | D Score | E Score | Pen. | Score 2 | Total |
|---|---|---|---|---|---|---|---|---|---|---|
| 1st place, gold medalist(s) | (Romania) Ana Bărbosu | 5.4 | 8.850 | | 14.250 | 4.8 | 8.900 | | 13.700 | 13.975 |
| 2nd place, silver medalist(s) | (Bulgaria) Valentina Georgieva | 5.0 | 8.900 | | 13.900 | 4.6 | 9.100 | | 13.700 | 13.800 |
| 3rd place, bronze medalist(s) | (Ukraine) Daria Lyska | 5.4 | 8.850 | 0.100 | 14.150 | 5.0 | 7.850 | 0.300 | 12.550 | 13.350 |
| 4 | (Turkey) Beyza Özen | 4.4 | 8.700 | | 13.100 | 4.8 | 8.750 | | 13.550 | 13.325 |
| 5 | (Romania) Maria Ceplinschi | 4.6 | 8.850 | | 13.450 | 4.2 | 8.700 | | 12.900 | 13.175 |
| 6 | (Croatia) Sara Šulekić | 4.6 | 8.750 | | 13.350 | 4.2 | 8.800 | | 13.000 | 13.175 |
| 7 | (Croatia) Antea Ercegović | 4.6 | 8.700 | | 13.300 | 4.2 | 8.600 | | 12.800 | 13.050 |
| 8 | (Hungary) Kira Balázs | 4.6 | 8.650 | | 13.250 | 4.0 | 8.800 | | 12.800 | 13.025 |

=== Uneven bars ===
| Position | Gymnast | D Score | E Score | Penalty | Total |
|---|---|---|---|---|---|
| 1st place, gold medalist(s) | (Romania) Ana Bărbosu | 5.6 | 7.850 | | 13.450 |
| 2nd place, silver medalist(s) | (Croatia) Sara Šulekić | 4.5 | 7.900 | | 12.400 |
| 3rd place, bronze medalist(s) | (Turkey) Derin Tanrıyaşükür | 4.5 | 7.550 | | 12.050 |
| 4 | (Turkey) Bezya Özen | 4.2 | 7.400 | | 11.600 |
| 5 | (Hungary) Anna Szmirnov | 4.3 | 7.150 | | 11.450 |
| 6 | (Croatia) Nika Kukuljan Frleta | 4.2 | 6.500 | | 10.700 |
| 7 | (Romania) Iulia Trestianu | 4.9 | 5.650 | | 10.550 |
| 8 | (Ukraine) Daniela Batrona | 4.9 | 4.500 | | 9.400 |

=== Balance beam ===
| Position | Gymnast | D Score | E Score | Penalty | Total |
|---|---|---|---|---|---|
| 1st place, gold medalist(s) | (Romania) Ana Bărbosu | 5.1 | 8.000 | | 13.100 |
| 2nd place, silver medalist(s) | (Hungary) Gréta Mayer | 5.5 | 7.600 | | 13.100 |
| 3rd place, bronze medalist(s) | (Romania) Andreea Preda | 4.7 | 8.000 | | 12.700 |
| 4 | (Ukraine) Daria Lyska | 5.1 | 7.500 | | 12.600 |
| 5 | (Turkey) Sevgi Kayışoğlu | 5.1 | 7.400 | | 12.500 |
| 6 | (Ukraine) Yuliia Kasianenko | 5.3 | 6.950 | | 12.250 |
| 7 | (Czech Republic) Lucie Maříková | 4.4 | 6.650 | | 11.050 |
| 8 | (Malta) Tara Vella Clark | 4.1 | 5.250 | | 9.350 |

=== Floor ===
| Position | Gymnast | D Score | E Score | Penalty | |
|---|---|---|---|---|---|
| 1st place, gold medalist(s) | (Romania) Ana Bărbosu | 5.4 | 7.850 | | 13.250 |
| 2nd place, silver medalist(s) | (Romania) Maria Ceplinschi | 4.8 | 8.100 | | 12.900 |
| 3rd place, bronze medalist(s) | (Hungary) Gréta Mayer | 4.9 | 7.850 | | 12.750 |
| 4 | (Ukraine) Daniela Batrona | 4.7 | 7.750 | | 12.450 |
| 5 | (Slovenia) Zala Trtnik | 4.5 | 7.900 | | 12.400 |
| 6 | (Ukraine) Daria Lyska | 4.9 | 7.450 | | 12.350 |
| 7 | (Czech Republic) Nela Štěpandová | 4.2 | 8.000 | | 12.200 |
| 8 | (Croatia) Sara Šulekić | 4.4 | 7.400 | | 11.800 |

== Qualification ==
=== Senior ===
==== Team competition ====
Due to the smaller competition roster, the team final was reduced to six teams.

| Rank | Team | Vault (gymnastics) | Uneven bars | Balance beam | Floor (gymnastics) | Total | Qual. |
|---|---|---|---|---|---|---|---|
| 1 | Romania | 41.799 (2) | 38.332 (2) | 39.599 (1) | 39.766 (1) | 159.496 | Q |
| 1 | Antonia Duță | | 11.966 | | 13.200 | 159.496 | Q |
| 1 | Larisa Iordache | 13.933 | 13.566 | 13.633 | 13.433 | 159.496 | Q |
| 1 | Silviana Sfiringu | 14.166 | 12.266 | 13.100 | 13.133 | 159.496 | Q |
| 1 | Ioana Stănciulescu | 13.700 | 12.500 | 12.500 | 13.066 | 159.496 | Q |
| 1 | Daniela Trică | 13.466 | | 12.866 | | 159.496 | Q |
| 2 | Ukraine | 41.565 (3) | 37.866 (3) | 37.866 (2) | 37.599 (2) | 154.896 | Q |
| 2 | Anastasiia Bachynska | 13.766 | 11.366 | 13.000 | 12.033 | 154.896 | Q |
| 2 | Yelyzaveta Hubareva | 13.533 | 12.666 | | | 154.896 | Q |
| 2 | Anastasiia Motak | 14.266 | 12.700 | 12.733 | 11.600 | 154.896 | Q |
| 2 | Angelina Radivilova | 13.233 | | 12.133 | 13.066 | 154.896 | Q |
| 2 | Diana Varinska | | 12.500 | 11.966 | 12.500 | 154.896 | Q |
| 3 | Hungary | 41.865 (1) | 40.066 (1) | 35.366 (4) | 36.832 (3) | 154.129 | Q |
| 3 | Csenge Bácskay | 13.766 | 12.000 | 10.566 | | 154.129 | Q |
| 3 | Dorina Böczögő | 13.566 | | 11.600 | 12.633 | 154.129 | Q |
| 3 | Zsófia Kovács | 14.533 | 14.133 | 11.766 | | 154.129 | Q |
| 3 | Mirtill Makovits | | 12.600 | 12.000 | 11.733 | 154.129 | Q |
| 3 | Zója Székely | 13.300 | 13.333 | | 12.466 | 154.129 | Q |
| 4 | Turkey | 40.166 (4) | 35.132 (4) | 35.232 (5) | 36.599 (4) | 147.129 | Q |
| 4 | Cemre Kendirci | 13.166 | 11.833 | 11.333 | 12.033 | 147.129 | Q |
| 4 | Bilge Tarhan | 13.300 | 11.066 | 12.366 | 12.166 | 147.129 | Q |
| 4 | Göksu Üçtaş Şanlı | | | 11.533 | 12.400 | 147.129 | Q |
| 4 | Ece Yağmur Yavuz | 13.400 | 10.666 | | | 147.129 | Q |
| 4 | Dilara Yurtdaş | 13.466 | 12.233 | 9.966 | 10.400 | 147.129 | Q |
| 5 | Czech Republic | 39.899 (5) | 33.099 (5) | 33.999 (7) | 35.232 (5) | 142.229 | Q |
| 5 | Natálie Brabcová | | 9.933 | 9.733 | | 142.229 | Q |
| 5 | Magdalena Coufalová | 13.066 | | | 11.766 | 142.229 | Q |
| 5 | Sabina Hálová | 12.533 | 11.500 | 11.100 | 11.300 | 142.229 | Q |
| 5 | Aneta Holasová | 13.400 | 8.166 | 11.766 | 11.500 | 142.229 | Q |
| 5 | Dominika Ponížilová | 13.433 | 11.666 | 11.133 | 11.966 | 142.229 | Q |
| 6 | Croatia | 38.266 (6) | 32.366 (7) | 34.766 (6) | 34.666 (6) | 140.064 | Q |
| 6 | Ana Đerek | | | 11.466 | 11.433 | 140.064 | Q |
| 6 | Petra Furač | 12.500 | 10.533 | 11.033 | 11.233 | 140.064 | Q |
| 6 | Tijana Korent | 13.433 | | | | 140.064 | Q |
| 6 | Tina Zelčić | | 9.233 | 11.200 | | 140.064 | Q |
| 6 | Christina Zwicker | 12.333 | 12.600 | 12.100 | 12.000 | 140.064 | Q |
| 7 | Luxembourg | 37.366 (8) | 32.866 (6) | 35.565 (3) | 33.632 (8) | 139.429 | R1 |
| 7 | Chiara Castellucci | 13.200 | 9.833 | 11.666 | 10.900 | 139.429 | R1 |
| 7 | Céleste Mordenti | 12.133 | 12.133 | 11.833 | 11.366 | 139.429 | R1 |
| 7 | Lola Schleich | 12.033 | 10.900 | 12.066 | 11.366 | 139.429 | R1 |
| 8 | Latvia | 37.732 (7) | 30.166 (8) | 33.966 (8) | 33.998 (7) | 135.862 | R2 |
| 8 | Anna Ločmele | 12.300 | 8.400 | 11.233 | 10.033 | 135.862 | R2 |
| 8 | Arina Oļenova | 10.966 | | 9.366 | 11.666 | 135.862 | R2 |
| 8 | Zane Petrova | 11.966 | 9.266 | 10.000 | 11.366 | 135.862 | R2 |
| 8 | Elina Vihrova | 13.466 | 12.500 | 12.733 | 10.966 | 135.862 | R2 |

==== Vault ====
| Rank | Gymnast | Vault 1 | | | | Vault 2 | | | | Total | Qual. |
| Rank | Gymnast | D Score | E Score | Pen. | Score 1 | D Score | E Score | Pen. | Score 2 | Total | Qual. |
|---|---|---|---|---|---|---|---|---|---|---|---|
| 1 | (Hungary) Zsófia Kovács | 5.4 | 9.133 | | 14.533 | 4.8 | 8.766 | | 13.566 | 14.049 | Q |
| 2 | (Ukraine) Anastasiia Motak | 5.4 | 8.866 | | 14.266 | 4.8 | 8.800 | | 13.600 | 13.933 | Q |
| 3 | (Romania) Larisa Iordache | 5.4 | 8.533 | | 13.933 | 4.8 | 8.700 | | 13.500 | 13.716 | Q |
| 4 | (Hungary) Csenge Bácskay | 5.0 | 8.766 | | 13.766 | 4.8 | 8.800 | | 13.600 | 13.683 | Q |
| 5 | (Turkey) Dilara Yurtdaş | 4.6 | 8.866 | | 13.466 | 4.6 | 8.800 | | 13.400 | 13.433 | Q |
| 6 | (Romania) Ioana Stănciulescu | 5.4 | 8.600 | 0.300 | 13.700 | 4.2 | 8.866 | | 13.066 | 13.383 | Q |
| 7 | (Latvia) Elina Vihrova | 4.6 | 8.866 | | 13.466 | 4.6 | 8.700 | | 13.300 | 13.383 | Q |
| 8 | (Croatia) Tijana Korent | 4.6 | 8.833 | | 13.433 | 4.6 | 8.733 | | 13.333 | 13.383 | Q |
| 9 | (Turkey) Bilge Tarhan | 5.0 | 8.400 | 0.100 | 13.300 | 4.6 | 8.700 | | 13.300 | 13.300 | R1 |
| 10 | (Czech Republic) Dominika Ponížilová | 4.8 | 8.733 | 0.100 | 13.433 | 4.6 | 8.600 | 0.100 | 13.100 | 13.266 | R2 |
| 11 | (Israel) Lihie Raz | 4.6 | 8.833 | | 13.433 | 4.2 | 8.800 | | 13.000 | 13.216 | R3 |

==== Uneven bars ====
| Rank | Gymnast | D Score | E Score | Pen. | Total | Qual. |
|---|---|---|---|---|---|---|
| 1 | (Hungary) Zsófia Kovács | 5.7 | 8.433 | | 14.133 | Q |
| 2 | (Slovakia) Barbora Mokošová | 5.5 | 8.066 | | 13.566 | Q |
| 2 | (Romania) Larisa Iordache | 5.5 | 8.066 | | 13.566 | Q |
| 4 | (Hungary) Zója Székely | 5.8 | 7.533 | | 13.333 | Q |
| 5 | (Ukraine) Anastasiia Motak | 5.7 | 7.000 | | 12.700 | Q |
| 6 | (Ukraine) Yelyzaveta Hubareva | 5.7 | 6.966 | | 12.666 | Q |
| 7 | (Croatia) Christina Zwicker | 4.4 | 8.200 | | 12.600 | Q |
| 8 | (Hungary) Mirtill Makovits | 5.0 | 7.600 | | 12.600 | – |
| 9 | (Latvia) Elina Vihrova | 5.1 | 7.400 | | 12.500 | Q |
| 10 | (Ukraine) Diana Varinska | 5.4 | 7.100 | | 12.500 | – |
| 10 | (Romania) Ioana Stănciulescu | 5.4 | 7.100 | | 12.500 | R1 |
| 12 | (Austria) Elisa Hämmerle | 4.9 | 7.433 | | 12.333 | R2 |
| 13 | (Romania) Silviana Sfiringu | 5.8 | 6.466 | | 12.266 | – |
| 14 | (Turkey) Dilara Yurtdaş | 4.5 | 7.733 | | 12.233 | R3 |

==== Balance beam ====
| Rank | Gymnast | D Score | E Score | Pen. | Total | Qual. |
|---|---|---|---|---|---|---|
| 1 | (Romania) Larisa Iordache | 6.0 | 7.633 | | 13.633 | Q |
| 2 | (Romania) Silviana Sfiringu | 5.4 | 7.700 | | 13.100 | Q |
| 3 | (Ukraine) Anastasiia Bachynska | 5.7 | 7.300 | | 13.000 | Q |
| 4 | (Romania) Daniela Trică | 5.0 | 7.866 | | 12.866 | – |
| 5 | (Latvia) Elina Vihrova | 5.2 | 7.533 | | 12.733 | Q |
| 6 | (Ukraine) Anastasiia Motak | 5.8 | 7.033 | 0.100 | 12.733 | Q |
| 7 | (Romania) Ioana Stănciulescu | 5.2 | 7.300 | | 12.500 | – |
| 8 | (Turkey) Bilge Tarhan | 5.1 | 7.266 | | 12.366 | Q |
| 9 | (Ukraine) Angelina Radivilova | 5.4 | 6.733 | | 12.133 | – |
| 10 | (Croatia) Christina Zwicker | 4.7 | 7.400 | | 12.100 | Q |
| 11 | (Austria) Elisa Hämmerle | 4.3 | 7.766 | | 12.066 | Q |
| 12 | (Luxembourg) Lola Schleich | 4.5 | 7.566 | | 12.066 | R1 |
| 13 | (Hungary) Mirtill Makovits | 4.6 | 7.400 | | 12.000 | R2 |
| 14 | (Ukraine) Diana Varinska | 5.1 | 6.866 | | 11.966 | – |
| 15 | (Luxembourg) Céleste Mordenti | 4.6 | 7.233 | | 11.833 | R3 |

==== Floor ====
| Rank | Gymnast | D Score | E Score | Pen. | Total | Qual. |
|---|---|---|---|---|---|---|
| 1 | (Romania) Larisa Iordache | 5.7 | 7.833 | 0.100 | 13.433 | Q |
| 2 | (Romania) Antonia Duță | 5.0 | 8.200 | | 13.200 | Q |
| 3 | (Romania) Silviana Sfiringu | 5.5 | 7.633 | | 13.133 | – |
| 4 | (Romania) Ioana Stănciulescu | 5.5 | 7.866 | 0.300 | 13.066 | – |
| 5 | (Ukraine) Angelina Radivilova | 5.2 | 7.866 | | 13.066 | Q |
| 6 | (Israel) Lihie Raz | 4.9 | 8.033 | | 12.933 | Q |
| 7 | (Hungary) Dorina Böczögő | 4.8 | 7.833 | | 12.633 | Q |
| 8 | (Ukraine) Diana Varinska | 4.7 | 7.900 | 0.100 | 12.500 | Q |
| 9 | (Hungary) Zója Székely | 4.4 | 8.066 | | 12.466 | Q |
| 10 | (Turkey) Göksu Üçtaş Şanlı | 4.7 | 8.000 | 0.300 | 12.400 | Q |
| 11 | (Slovakia) Barbora Mokošová | 4.4 | 7.900 | | 12.300 | R1 |
| 12 | (Austria) Elisa Hämmerle | 4.4 | 8.066 | 0.200 | 12.266 | R2 |
| 13 | (Slovenia) Lucija Hribar | 4.3 | 7.900 | | 12.200 | R3 |

=== Junior ===
==== Vault ====
| Rank | Gymnast | Vault 1 | | | | Vault 2 | | | | Total | Qual. |
| Rank | Gymnast | D Score | E Score | Pen. | Score 1 | D Score | E Score | Pen. | Score 2 | Total | Qual. |
|---|---|---|---|---|---|---|---|---|---|---|---|
| 1 | (Romania) Ana Bărbosu | 5.4 | 9.000 | | 14.400 | 4.8 | 8.900 | | 13.700 | 14.050 | Q |
| 2 | (Ukraine) Daria Lyska | 5.4 | 8.566 | 0.100 | 13.866 | 5.0 | 8.866 | | 13.866 | 13.866 | Q |
| 3 | (Romania) Maria Ceplinschi | 4.6 | 9.033 | | 13.633 | 4.2 | 8.833 | | 13.033 | 13.333 | Q |
| 4 | (Turkey) Beyza Özen | 4.4 | 8.633 | | 13.033 | 4.8 | 8.600 | | 13.400 | 13.216 | Q |
| 5 | (Bulgaria) Valentina Georgieva | 5.0 | 7.533 | | 12.533 | 4.6 | 9.100 | | 13.700 | 13.116 | Q |
| 6 | (Romania) Andreea Preda | 4.6 | 8.666 | | 13.266 | 4.0 | 8.900 | | 12.900 | 13.083 | – |
| 7 | (Hungary) Kira Balázs | 4.6 | 8.833 | | 13.433 | 4.0 | 8.700 | | 12.700 | 13.066 | Q |
| 8 | (Croatia) Sara Šulekić | 4.6 | 8.666 | | 13.266 | 4.2 | 8.666 | | 12.866 | 13.066 | Q |
| 9 | (Croatia) Antea Ercegović | 4.6 | 8.700 | 0.100 | 13.200 | 4.2 | 8.700 | | 12.900 | 13.050 | Q |
| 10 | (Slovenia) Zala Trtnik | 4.6 | 8.933 | | 13.533 | 3.5 | 8.766 | | 12.266 | 12.899 | R1 |
| 11 | (Hungary) Gréta Mayer | 4.2 | 8.733 | | 12.933 | 4.0 | 8.800 | | 12.800 | 12.866 | R2 |
| 12 | (Czech Republic) Nela Tereza Kaplanová | 4.2 | 8.766 | | 12.966 | 4.0 | 8.733 | | 12.733 | 12.849 | R3 |

==== Uneven bars ====
| Rank | Gymnast | D Score | E Score | Pen. | Total | Qual. |
|---|---|---|---|---|---|---|
| 1 | (Romania) Ana Bărbosu | 5.4 | 8.033 | | 13.433 | Q |
| 2 | (Croatia) Sara Šulekić | 4.5 | 7.900 | | 12.400 | Q |
| 3 | (Croatia) Nika Kukuljan Frleta | 4.3 | 7.833 | | 12.133 | Q |
| 4 | (Ukraine) Daniela Batrona | 5.1 | 7.033 | | 12.133 | Q |
| 5 | (Hungary) Anna Szmirnov | 4.4 | 7.666 | | 12.066 | Q |
| 6 | (Romania) Iulia Trestianu | 4.8 | 7.133 | | 11.933 | Q |
| 7 | (Romania) Maria Ceplinschi | 3.9 | 8.000 | | 11.900 | – |
| 8 | (Turkey) Derin Tanrıyaşükür | 4.5 | 7.366 | | 11.866 | Q |
| 9 | (Turkey) Beyza Özen | 4.0 | 7.733 | | 11.733 | Q |
| 10 | (Turkey) Bengisu Yıldız | 3.7 | 7.933 | | 11.633 | – |
| 11 | (Hungary) Kira Balázs | 4.1 | 7.466 | | 11.566 | R1 |
| 12 | (Ukraine) Daria Lyska | 5.1 | 6.266 | | 11.366 | R2 |
| 13 | (Czech Republic) Nela Štěpandová | 3.5 | 7.800 | | 11.300 | R3 |

==== Balance beam ====
| Rank | Gymnast | D Score | E Score | Pen. | Total | Qual. |
|---|---|---|---|---|---|---|
| 1 | (Romania) Ana Bărbosu | 5.1 | 7.933 | | 13.033 | Q |
| 2 | (Romania) Andreea Preda | 4.7 | 8.166 | | 12.866 | Q |
| 3 | (Turkey) Sevgi Kayışoğlu | 5.0 | 7.266 | | 12.266 | Q |
| 4 | (Malta) Tara Vella Clark | 4.8 | 7.400 | | 12.200 | Q |
| 5 | (Ukraine) Yuliia Kasianenko | 5.4 | 6.433 | | 11.833 | Q |
| 6 | (Romania) Maria Ceplinschi | 4.5 | 7.300 | | 11.800 | – |
| 7 | (Romania) Iulia Trestianu | 4.8 | 7.000 | | 11.800 | – |
| 8 | (Ukraine) Daria Lyska | 5.2 | 6.533 | | 11.733 | Q |
| 9 | (Hungary) Gréta Mayer | 5.3 | 6.433 | | 11.733 | Q |
| 10 | (Czech Republic) Lucie Maříková | 4.5 | 7.166 | | 11.666 | Q |
| 11 | (Czech Republic) Lucie Trnková | 4.7 | 6.933 | | 11.633 | R1 |
| 12 | (Ukraine) Daniela Batrona | 5.2 | 6.433 | | 11.633 | – |
| 13 | (Czech Republic) Nela Štěpandová | 4.8 | 6.800 | | 11.600 | – |
| 14 | (Hungary) Kira Balázs | 4.4 | 6.966 | | 11.366 | R2 |
| 15 | (Hungary) Flora Beke | 4.5 | 6.566 | | 11.066 | – |
| 16 | (Turkey) Bengisu Yıldız | 4.8 | 6.266 | | 11.066 | R3 |

==== Floor ====
| Rank | Gymnast | D Score | E Score | Pen. | Total | Qual. |
|---|---|---|---|---|---|---|
| 1 | (Romania) Ana Bărbosu | 5.4 | 8.333 | | 13.733 | Q |
| 2 | (Romania) Maria Ceplinschi | 4.8 | 8.366 | | 13.166 | Q |
| 3 | (Romania) Andreea Preda | 4.9 | 8.233 | | 13.133 | – |
| 4 | (Hungary) Gréta Mayer | 4.9 | 8.033 | | 12.933 | Q |
| 5 | (Ukraine) Daniela Batrona | 4.7 | 8.000 | | 12.700 | Q |
| 6 | (Romania) Iulia Trestianu | 4.8 | 7.900 | | 12.700 | – |
| 7 | (Ukraine) Daria Lyska | 4.9 | 7.566 | | 12.466 | Q |
| 8 | (Croatia) Sara Šulekić | 4.4 | 7.866 | | 12.266 | Q |
| 9 | (Czech Republic) Nela Štěpandová | 4.2 | 8.033 | | 12.233 | Q |
| 10 | (Slovenia) Zala Trtnik | 4.5 | 7.700 | | 12.200 | Q |
| 11 | (Ukraine) Yuliia Kasianenko | 4.7 | 7.366 | | 12.066 | – |
| 12 | (Croatia) Nika Kukuljan Frleta | 4.5 | 7.466 | | 11.966 | R1 |
| 13 | (Croatia) Antea Ercegović | 4.3 | 7.533 | | 11.833 | – |
| 14 | (Czech Republic) Nela Tereza Kaplanová | 4.1 | 7.600 | | 11.700 | R2 |
| 15 | (Ukraine) Viktoriia Ivanenko | 4.0 | 7.666 | | 11.666 | – |
| 16 | (Hungary) Kira Balázs | 4.3 | 7.366 | | 11.666 | R3 |
