= Yelyzaveta Hubareva =

Ukrainian artistic gymnast

Yelyzaveta Hubareva Єлизавета Губарєва
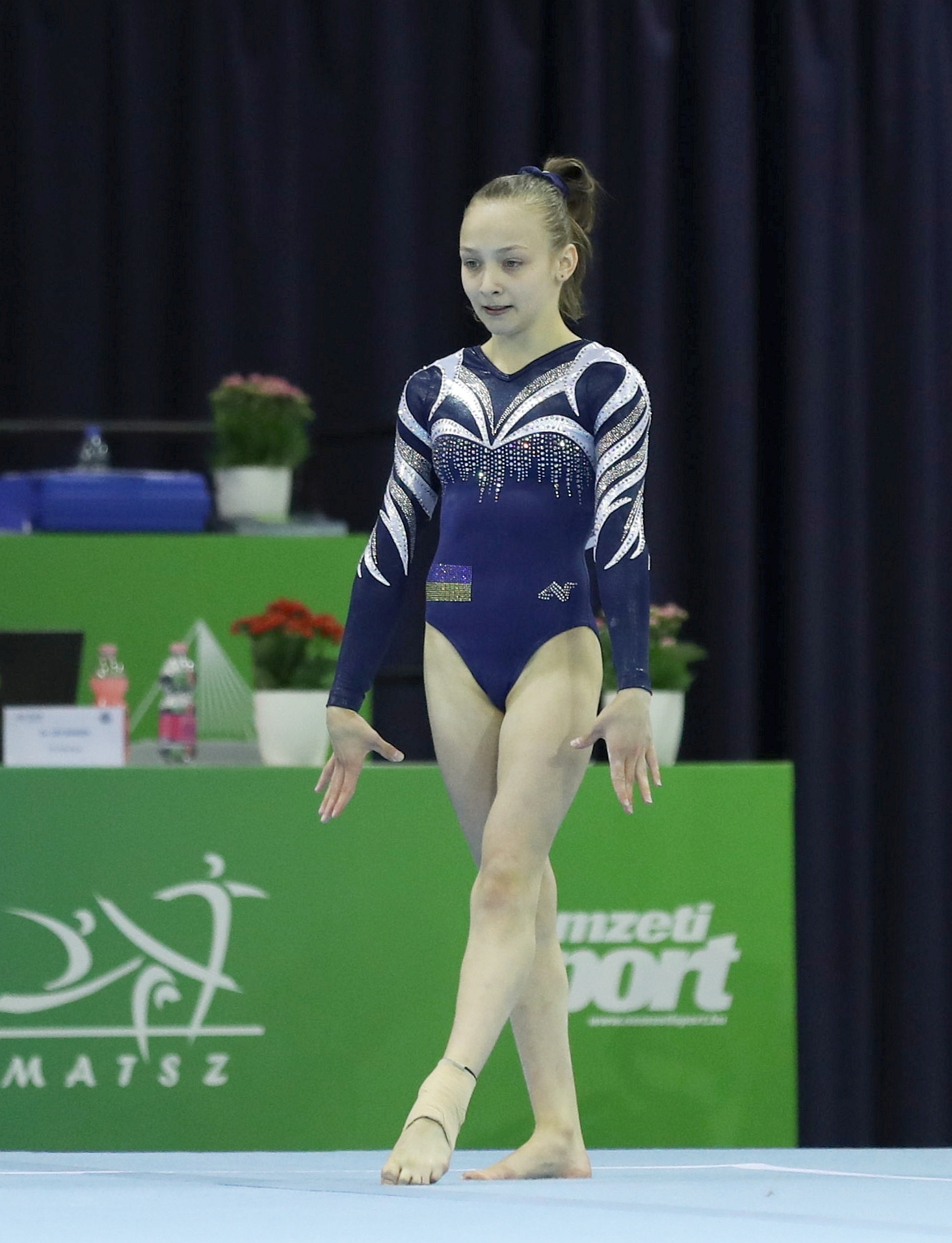
- Hubareva at the 2019 Junior World Artistic Gymnastics Championships

Personal information
- Full name: Yelyzaveta Serhiyivna Hubareva
- Alternative name: Elizaveta Gubareva
- Nickname: Liza
- Born: June 16, 2004 (age 22) Donetsk, Ukraine

Gymnastics career
- Discipline: Women's artistic gymnastics
- Country represented: Ukraine; (2018–present)
- Club: Children's and Youth Sports School of the City of Dnipro
- Gym: Koncha-Zaspa Olympic Training and Sports Center
- Head coaches: Oleg Ostapenko; Yulia Kaiukova
- Former coach: Yulia Hubareva
- Choreographer: Nadia Ostapenko
Medal record
Women's artistic gymnastics
Representing Ukraine
European Championships
| Gold medal – first place | 2020 Mersin | Team |
FIG World Cup
| Event | 1st | 2nd | 3rd |
|---|---|---|---|
| World Challenge Cup | 0 | 1 | 0 |
| Total | 0 | 1 | 0 |

Yelyzaveta Serhiyivna Hubareva (Ukrainian: Єлизавета Сергіївна Губарєва, born 16 June 2004) is a Ukrainian artistic gymnast. She was a member of the gold medal-winning team at the 2020 European Championships.

== Early life ==
Hubareva was born in Donetsk, Donetsk Oblast, Ukraine on 16 June 2004. She began gymnastics in 2010 after being introduced to the sport by her mother, who would become her first coach.

== Gymnastics career ==
=== 2019 ===
In March Hubareva competed at the Ukrainian Championships. She placed second in the all-around. She would later compete at the Stella Zakharova Cup, winning gold on floor exercise.

In June Hubareva competed at the inaugural Junior World Championships held in Győr, Hungary alongside Anastasia Motak and Daria Murzhak. They finished 13th as a team. They next competed at the European Youth Olympic Festival where they finished 10th as a team.

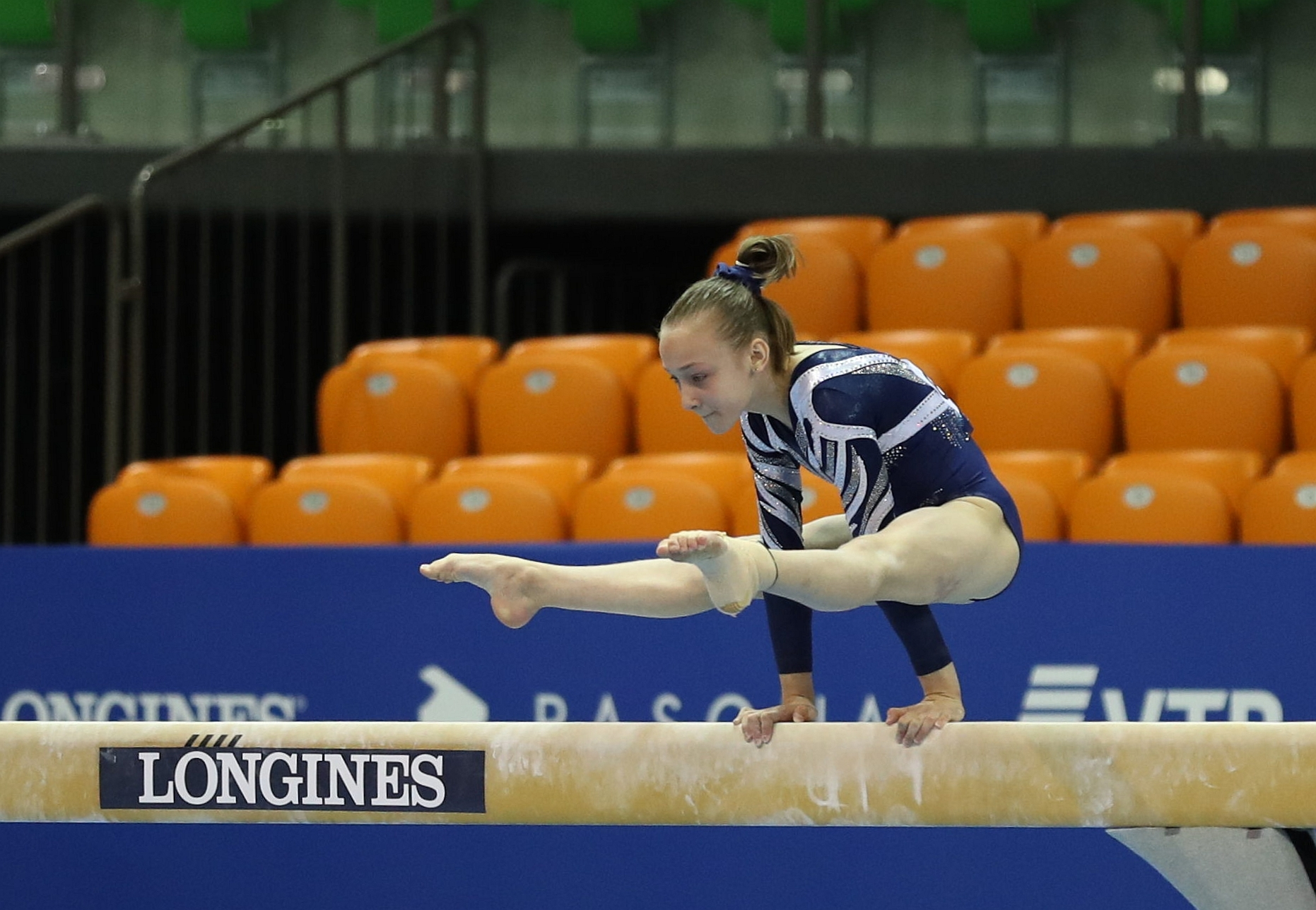
Balance Beam

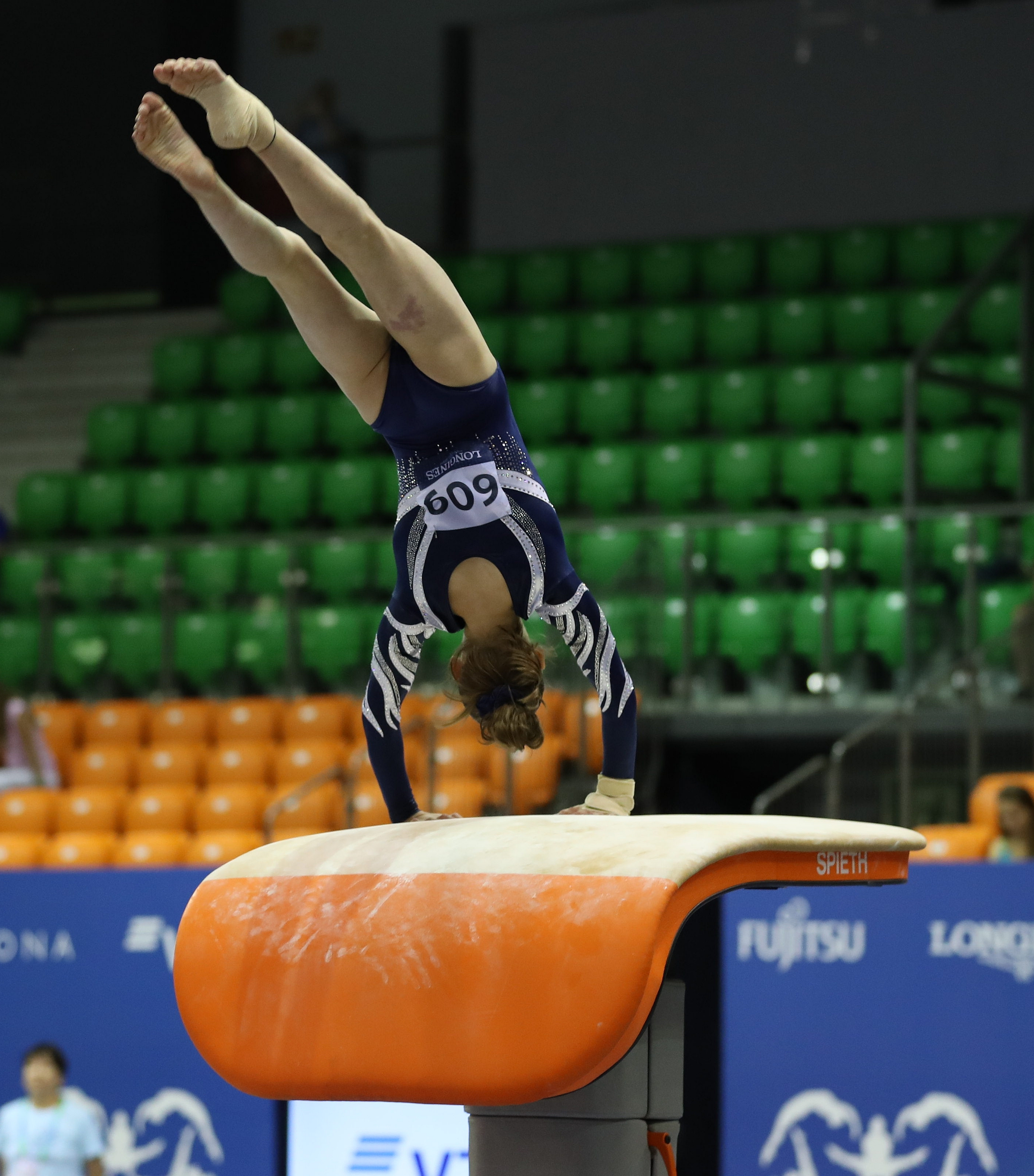
Vault

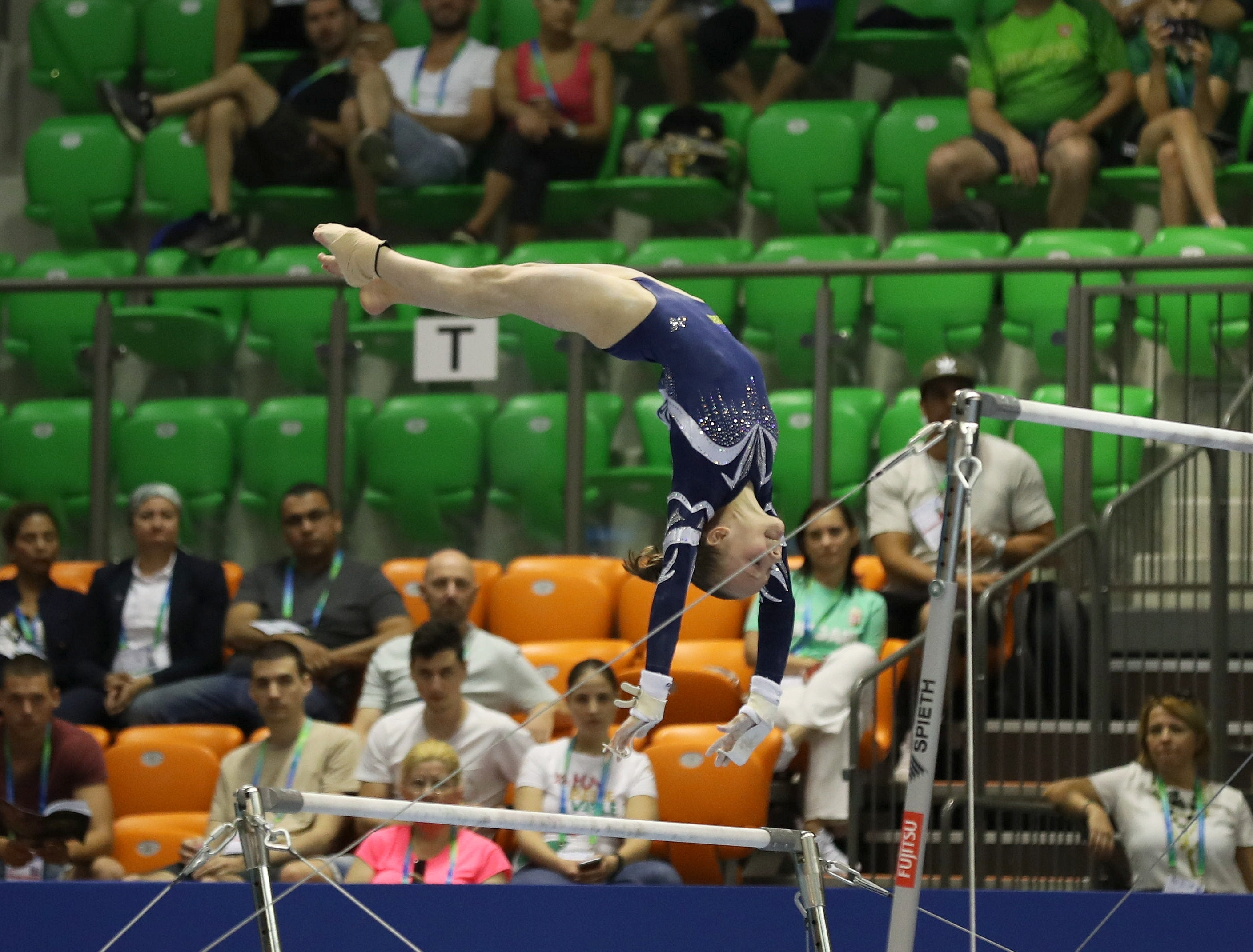
Uneven Bars

Hubareva at the 2019 Junior World Championships

=== 2020 ===
In September Hubareva made her senior debut at the Ukrainian Championships. She placed third in the all-around and second on floor exercise.

In December, Hubareva competed at the European Championships. During the qualification, she helped Ukraine qualify to the team final in second place behind Romania and individually, she qualified to the uneven bars final. During the team final, she competed on the vault and floor exercise, contributing towards Ukraine's gold medal finish ahead of Romania. In the uneven bars final, she finished in seventh place.

=== 2021 ===
Hubareva competed at the World Challenge Cups in Koper and Mersin, winning the silver on the uneven bars in the latter behind Zója Székely. In October Hubareva competed at the World Championships where she placed 14th in the all-around.

In November Hubareva competed at the Arthur Gander Memorial. She placed fourth in the three-event all-around, behind Angelina Melnikova of Russia, Taïs Boura of France, and Ciena Alipio of the United States. Next she competed at the Swiss Cup where she was partnered with Illia Kovtun. They finished second in the competition behind of the Russian team of Nikita Nagornyy and Melnikova.

== Competitive history ==
| Year | Event | Team | AA | VT | UB | BB | FX |
Junior
| 2018 | Stella Zakharova Cup | | 3rd place, bronze medalist(s) | 4 | 2nd place, silver medalist(s) | | 2nd place, silver medalist(s) |
| 2018 | Gym Festival Trnava | | 7 | | 4 | | |
| 2019 | Ukrainian Championships | | 2nd place, silver medalist(s) | | | | |
| 2019 | Stella Zakharova Cup | 5 | 11 | | | | 1st place, gold medalist(s) |
| 2019 | European Games Test Event | | 2nd place, silver medalist(s) | 3rd place, bronze medalist(s) | 6 | 1st place, gold medalist(s) | 1st place, gold medalist(s) |
| 2019 | Gym Festival Trnava | | 2nd place, silver medalist(s) | | 2nd place, silver medalist(s) | | |
| 2019 | Junior World Championships | 13 | | | | | |
| 2019 | Euro Youth Olympic Festival | 10 | | | | | |
Senior
| 2020 | Ukrainian Championships | | 3rd place, bronze medalist(s) | | | | 2nd place, silver medalist(s) |
| 2020 | European Championships | 1st place, gold medalist(s) | | | 7 | | |
| 2021 | Koper Challenge Cup | | | 6 | 6 | | |
| 2021 | Mersin Challenge Cup | | | | 2nd place, silver medalist(s) | 8 | |
| 2021 | World Championships | | 14 | | | | |
| 2021 | Arthur Gander Memorial | | 4 | | | | |
| 2021 | Swiss Cup | 2nd place, silver medalist(s) | | | | | |
2022
| 2022 | World Championships | 23 | | | | | |
| 2023 | Cottbus World Cup | | | | 5 | | |
| 2023 | Doha World Cup | | | | 4 | | |
| 2023 | Baku World Cup | | | | | 6 | |
| 2023 | European Championships | 16 | | | | | |
| 2023 | Cairo World Cup | | | | | | |

== Floor music ==
| Year | Music Title |
|---|---|
| 2018-20 | "La vie est belle" by Nassi |
