= Ukraine women's national artistic gymnastics team =

Women's national sports team

Ukraine
- Continental union: European Union of Gymnastics
- National federation: Ukrainian Federation of Artistic Gymnastics
- Head coach: Igor Radivilov

Olympic Games
- Appearances: 4

World Championships
- Medals: Bronze: 1999

European Championships
- Medals: Gold: 2020; Silver: 2000, 2004; Bronze: 1994, 1996, 1998

The Ukraine women's national artistic gymnastics team represents Ukraine in FIG international competitions.

== History ==
After the fall of the Soviet Union, a handful of former Soviet gymnasts started competing for Ukraine. They participated as a team in the 1996, 2000, and 2004 Olympic Games. In 1999, they won their only World Championships team medal, a bronze.

== Senior roster ==
Name	Birthdate and age	Hometown
Anastasia Aleksandrova	26 June 2008 (age 18)	Cherkasy
Daniela Batrona	5 September 2006 (age 20)	Rivne
Yelizaveta Hubareva	16 June 2004 (age 22)	Dnipro
Polina Diachenko	25 July 2008 (age 18)	Donetsk
Anastasia Zubkova	8 August 2008 (age 18)	Donetsk
Yulia Kasianenko	19 November 2006 (age 20)	Cherkasy
Marherita Kozlovska	7 February 2004 (age 22)	Khmelnytskyi
Marianna Kinyuk	24 August 2008 (age 18)	Ivano-Frankivsk
Ilona Krupa	13 April 2007 (age 19)	Lviv
Anna Lashchevska	20 November 2007 (age 19)	Ivano-Frankivsk
Diana Lobok	9 November 2008 (age 18)	Kyiv
Valeria Osipova	13 August 2001 (age 25)	Kyiv
Diana Savelieva	5 June 2004 (age 22)	Kropyvnytskyi
Diana Stadnik	31 August 2007 (age 19)	Cherkasy
Marta Chefranova	1 February 2008 (age 18)	Ivano-Frankivsk

== Team competition results ==
=== Olympic Games ===
- 1996 — 5th place
  Lilia Podkopayeva, Svetlana Zelepukina, Liubov Sheremeta, Anna Mirgorodskaya, Oksana Knizhnik, Olena Shaparna, Olga Teslenko
- 2000 — 5th place
  Viktoria Karpenko, Tetyana Yarosh, Olga Roshchupkina, Halyna Tyryk, Olha Teslenko, Alona Kvasha
- 2004 — 4th place
  Mirabella Akhunu, Alina Kozich, Iryna Krasnianska, Alona Kvasha, Olga Sherbatykh, Irina Yarotska
- 2008 — 11th place
  Valentyna Holenkova, Alina Kozich, Iryna Krasnianska, Maryna Proskurina, Dariya Zgoba, Anastasia Koval
- 2012 — did not qualify a full team; individual competitor: Natalia Kononenko
- 2016 — did not qualify a full team; individual competitor: Angelina Kysla
- 2020 — did not qualify a full team; individual competitor: Diana Varinska
- 2024 — did not qualify a full team; individual competitor: Anna Lashchevska

=== World Championships ===
- 1994 — 5th place
  Irina Bulakhova, Lilia Podkopayeva, Elena Shapornaya, Natalia Paneteleyeva, Oksana Knizhnik, Tatiana Malaya, Olesia Shulga
- 1995 — 5th place
  Lilia Podkopayeva, Irina Bulakhova, Anna Mirgorodskaya, Olena Shaparna, Oksana Knizhnik, Svetlana Zelepukina, Viktoria Karpenko
- 1997 — 4th place
  Liubov Sheremeta, Olga Teslenko, Inha Shkarupa, Galina Tyryk
- 1999 — bronze medal
  Viktoria Karpenko, Tatiana Yarosh, Inha Shkarupa, Olga Teslenko, Olga Roschupkina, Nataliya Horodny
- 2001 — 6th place
  Natalia Sirobaba, Alona Kvasha, Tatiana Yarosh, Irina Yarotska, Olga Roschupkina
- 2003 — 7th place
  Irina Yarotska, Alina Kozich, Irina Krasnyanska, Alona Kvasha, Marina Proskurina, Natalia Sirobaba
- 2006 — 5th place
  Olga Shcherbatykh, Iryna Krasnianska, Dariya Zgoba, Alina Kozich, Marina Proskurina, Marina Kostiuchenko
- 2007 — 9th place
  Valentyna Holenkova, Anastasia Koval, Alina Kozich, Marina Proskurina, Olga Sherbatykh, Dariya Zgoba
- 2010 — 12th place
  Valentyna Holenkova, Alona Kaydalova, Yevheniya Cherniy, Anastasia Koval, Yana Demyanchuk, Alina Fomenko
- 2011 — did not participate
- 2014 — 27th place (did not qualify for team final)
  Yana Fedorova, Anastasiya Ilnytska, Angelina Kysla, Daria Matveieva, Krystyna Sankova, Olesya Sazonova
- 2015 — did not participate
- 2018 — 20th place (did not qualify for team final)
  Yana Fedorova, Valeria Osipova, Angelina Radivilova, Diana Varinska
- 2019 — 15th place (did not qualify for team final)
  Anastasia Bachynska, Yana Fedorova, Valeria Osipova, Angelina Radivilova, Diana Varinska
- 2022 — 23rd place (did not qualify for team final)
  Yelizaveta Hubareva, Yulia Kasianenko, Marharyta Kozlovska, Valeria Osipova, Diana Savelieva

=== Junior World Championships ===
- 2019 — 13th place
  Yelizaveta Hubareva, Anastasia Motak, Daria Murzhak

== Most decorated gymnasts ==
This list includes all Ukrainian female artistic gymnasts who have won a medal at the Olympic Games or the World Artistic Gymnastics Championships. Medals won as part of the Soviet Union, the Unified Team at the Olympics, or the Commonwealth of Independent States are not included.

Rank	Gymnast	Team	AA	VT	UB	BB	FX	Olympic Total	World Total	Total
1	Lilia Podkopayeva		1996; 1995	1995	1995	1996; 1994; 1995	1996	3	5	8
2	Viktoria Karpenko	1999	1999					0	2	2
3	Olga Roschupkina	1999				1999		0	2	2
3	Irina Yarotska	1999				2002		0	2	2
5	Iryna Krasnianska					2006		0	1	1
6	Nataliya Horodny	1999						0	1	1
6	Tatiana Lysenko		1993					0	1	1
6	Liubov Sheremeta						1996	0	1	1
6	Inga Shkarupa	1999						0	1	1
6	Olga Teslenko	1999						0	1	1
6	Tatiana Yarosh	1999						0	1	1

== See also ==
- List of Olympic female artistic gymnasts for Ukraine
- Ukraine men's national gymnastics team
- Soviet Union women's national artistic gymnastics team
