= Elīna Vihrova =

Latvian artistic gymnast

- Born: 27 June 2002 (age 24) Riga, Latvia

Gymnastics career
- Discipline: Women's artistic gymnastics
- Country represented: Latvia (2016 – present (LAT))
- College team: Penn State Nittany Lions (2021–25)
- Club: RVS-VOC
- Head coach: Igors Vihrovs
Medal record
Women's artistic gymnastics
Representing Latvia
FIG World Cup
Event	1st	2nd	3rd
World Challenge Cup	0	1	1

Elīna Vihrova (born 27 June 2002) is a Latvian artistic gymnast. She is the 2019 Latvian national champion and the 2020 Szombathely Challenge Cup balance beam silver medalist, and has competed at two World Championships (2018, 2019).

== Personal life ==
Vihrova was born 27 June 2002 in Riga to Inna Vihrova and Igors Vihrovs. Her father, Igors, was also an artistic gymnast and is the 2000 Olympic champion on floor. She has a sister, Milana. Vihrova is fluent in Russian and English.

In November 2020, Vihrova signed with Penn State to compete for their gymnastics team, beginning in the fall of 2021.

== Career ==
Vihrova was introduced to the sport from an early age by her father, who continues to be her coach.

=== Junior ===
==== 2016 ====
Vihrova competed at the 2016 European Championships, but did not advance to the all-around or event finals. She then competed at the Voronin Cup, where she placed fifth in the all-around, but won the bronze medal due to the two-per-country rule; the four gymnasts ahead of her – Elena Eremina, Elizaveta Kochetkova, Viktoria Trykina, and Varvara Zubova – all represented Russia. Vihrova also won bronze on floor, as well as finishing seventh on vault, sixth on uneven bars, and fourth on balance beam.

==== 2017 ====
At the 2017 European Youth Summer Olympic Festival, Vihrova and the Latvian team finished in 24th in qualifications. Individually, she placed 24th to advance to the all-around final, where she also finished 24th due to falls on multiple events. Vihrova rebounded at the VTB Cup in October, winning the title over Ukrainians Tetiana Mokliak and Daria Murzhak. She won medals on all four events: gold on vault and beam, silver on floor, and bronze on bars. Vihrova ended the season at the 2017 Voronin Cup, finishing sixth in the all-around (after two-per-country). In the event finals, she won bronze medals on bars and beam and finished fourth on floor.

=== Senior ===
==== 2018 ====
Due to injury, Vihrova competed only on bars at the 2018 Latvian Championships and won the title in event finals. She made her senior debut at the 2018 World Championships, where she did not advance to any finals. Vihrova competed at the Voronin Cup in December and won silvers on vault and floor.

==== 2019 ====
Vihrova opened her season by sweeping the all-around and event titles at the 2019 Tiger Cup. She then repeated the feat at the 2019 Latvian Championships. At the 2019 European Championships in April, Vihrova placed 31st in the all-around in qualifications to finish as the third reserve; she was also the second reserve on floor. She competed later that month as a guest at the Spanish League, competing only on vault and floor. In May, at the 2019 Osijek Challenge Cup, Vihrova placed fifth on bars and sixth on floor. Competing at the 2019 European Games under a one-per country, six-per final (18 in the AA) format, she qualified into the all-around final where she finished 16th. Vihrova was also the second reserve on vault. In September, she competed at the 2019 Szombathely Challenge Cup, finishing fifth on vault and fourth on beam, narrowly missing a medal by 0.100 points.

At the 2019 World Championships, Vihrova missed qualifying for the 2020 Summer Olympics after falling twice on beam. Her score of 47.199 points was less than a point behind the total of final qualifier Tan Sze En of Singapore. Vihrova announced that she intended to continue to pursue other qualification opportunities.

Vihrova completed her international season at the 2019 Cottbus World Cup in November, where she did not reach any event finals. Vihrova ended the year by competing as a guest at the French Top 12 Series.

==== 2020 ====
Vihrova again competed as a guest for the Spanish League, contributing the highest floor score of the day for her host club, as well as vault and bars. She then competed at the Tiger Cup the following month, earning all five golds for the second consecutive year. After the COVID-19 pandemic limited travel and competitive opportunities, Vihrova returned to international competition in October at the 2020 Szombathely Challenge Cup. In addition to winning her first international medal, silver on beam, she finished fourth on bars and sixth on floor.

In November, Vihrova announced her NCAA commitment to Penn State University. She is believed to be the first Latvian to compete in NCAA gymnastics. Vihrova chose Penn State over five other universities and was influenced by her attendance at the nearby Woodward Gymnastics Camp over the past six summers.

In December, at the rescheduled 2020 European Championships, featuring a depleted field due to the COVID-19 pandemic in Europe, Vihrova qualified to three event finals after falling on floor in qualifications. She finished seventh on vault, eight on bars, and fifth on beam.

== Competitive history ==
Year	Event	Team	AA	VT	UB	BB	FX
Junior
2016	European Championships		56				
2016	Voronin Cup		3rd place, bronze medalist(s)	7	6	4	3rd place, bronze medalist(s)
2017	Euro Youth Olympic Festival	24	24				
2017	VTB Cup		1st place, gold medalist(s)	1st place, gold medalist(s)	3rd place, bronze medalist(s)	1st place, gold medalist(s)	2nd place, silver medalist(s)
2017	Voronin Cup		6		3rd place, bronze medalist(s)	3rd place, bronze medalist(s)	4
Senior
2018	Latvian Championships				1st place, gold medalist(s)		
2018	World Championships		74				
2018	Voronin Cup		7	2nd place, silver medalist(s)	5		2nd place, silver medalist(s)
2019	Tiger Cup		1st place, gold medalist(s)	1st place, gold medalist(s)	1st place, gold medalist(s)	1st place, gold medalist(s)	1st place, gold medalist(s)
2019	Latvian Championships		1st place, gold medalist(s)	1st place, gold medalist(s)	1st place, gold medalist(s)	1st place, gold medalist(s)	1st place, gold medalist(s)
2019	European Championships		31				
2019	Osijek Challenge Cup				5		6
2019	European Games		16				
2019	Szombathely Challenge Cup			5		4	
2019	World Championships		109				
2020	Tiger Cup		1st place, gold medalist(s)	1st place, gold medalist(s)	1st place, gold medalist(s)	1st place, gold medalist(s)	1st place, gold medalist(s)
2020	Szombathely Challenge Cup				4	2nd place, silver medalist(s)	6
2020	European Championships	8		7	8	5	
2021
2021	European Championships		23			8	
2021	Osijek Challenge Cup			5	7	6	3rd place, bronze medalist(s)
