= Cemre Kendirci =

Turkish artistic gymnast

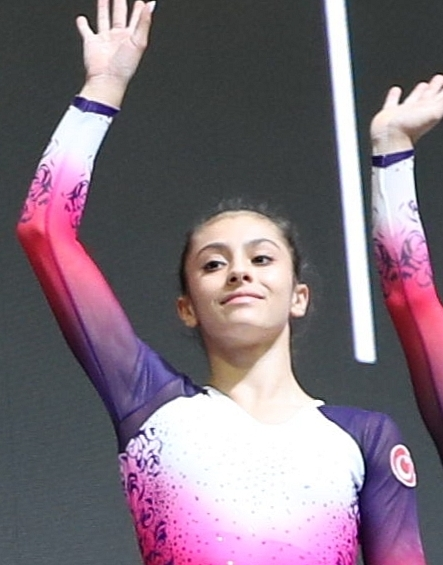
- Kendirci at the 2019 Junior World Championships

Personal information
- Born: 23 September 2004 (age 21) Kadıköy, Istanbul, Turkey

Gymnastics career
- Discipline: Women's artistic gymnastics
- Country represented: Turkey (2016–2021)
- Club: Atlas CSK

Cemre Kendirci (born 23 September 2004) is a Turkish former artistic gymnast. She competed at the 2020 and 2021 European Championships. She is the 2021 Turkish national all-around champion.

== Gymnastics career ==
Kendirci competed at the 2018 Junior European Championships alongside Nazlı Savranbaşı, Yaren Turan, Ece Yağmur Yavuz, and Dilara Yurtdaş, and they finished 13th in the team competition. Individually, she finished 39th in the all-around. She was the alternate for the team that competed at the 2019 Junior World Championships. At the 2019 European Youth Olympic Festival, she was the first reserve for the vault final, and the Turkish team finished 18th. Kendirci won the gold medal on the vault and the silver medal with her teammates at the 2019 Mediterranean Championships held in Cagliari, Italy.

Kendirci became age-eligible for senior competitions in 2020. At the 2020 Turkish Championships, she won the bronze medal in the all-around, and she won the gold medal in the balance beam final. She competed at the 2020 European Championships alongside Dilara Yurtdaş, Göksu Üçtaş Şanlı, Ece Yağmur Yavuz, and Bilge Tarhan, and they finished fourth in the team final.

Kendirci won the all-around title by over a point at the 2021 Turkish Championships. At the 2021 European Championships, she finished 77th in the all-around qualifications and did not advance into any finals. She finished fourth on the vault, seventh on the balance beam, and fourth on the floor exercise at the 2021 Cairo World Challenge Cup. Then at the Mersin World Challenge Cup, she finished eighth in the vault final. She has not competed since 2021.

== Personal life ==
Kendirci was a student of Suadiye Hacı Mustafa Tarman Anatolian High School in Istanbul.
