= 2021 Swiss Cup Zürich =

Artistic gymnastics competition

- Location: Zürich, Switzerland
- Date: November 7, 2021

Medalists
gold medal	(Russia) Angelina Melnikova & Nikita Nagornyy
silver medal	(Ukraine) Yelyzaveta Hubareva & Illia Kovtun
bronze medal	(Italy) Alice D'Amato & Stefano Patron

The 2021 Swiss Cup Zürich took place on November 7 in Zürich, Switzerland. It was the 33rd iteration of the event.

== Participants ==
Team	WAG	MAG
Austria	Marlies Männersdorfer	Alexander Benda
France	Taïs Boura	Léo Saladino
Germany	Kim Bui	Felix Remuta
Italy	Alice D'Amato	Stefano Patron
Russia	Angelina Melnikova	Nikita Nagornyy
Switzerland 1	Stefanie Siegenthaler	Henji Mboyo
Switzerland 2	Lena Bickel	Noe Seifert
Turkey	Göksu Üçtaş Şanlı	Ahmet Önder
Ukraine	Yelyzaveta Hubareva	Illia Kovtun
United States	Olivia Greaves	Yul Moldauer

== Results ==
=== Prelims ===
Rank	Name	Round 1	Round 2	Total
1	Russia			57.625
1	Angelina Melnikova	13.975	14.650	28.625
1	Nikita Nagornyy	14.650	14.350	29.000
2	Switzerland 2			54.550
2	Lena Bickel	12.250	13.050	25.300
2	Noe Seifert	14.850	14.400	29.250
3	Ukraine			54.475
3	Yelyzaveta Hubareva	12.875	13.150	26.025
3	Illia Kovtun	14.150	14.300	28.450
4	Italy			54.275
4	Alice D'Amato	14.000	13.150	27.025
4	Stefano Patron	13.850	13.400	27.250
5	Turkey			53.825
5	Göksu Üçtaş Şanlı	12.725	11.750	24.475
5	Ahmet Önder	14.400	14.950	29.350
6	France			52.750
6	Taïs Boura	13.400	11.750	25.150
6	Léo Saladino	13.200	14.400	27.600
7	Switzerland 1			50.800
7	Stefanie Siegenthaler	12.200	11.700	23.900
7	Henji Mboyo	14.050	12.850	26.900
8	Austria			49.200
8	Marlies Männersdorfer	11.900	11.000	22.900
8	Alexander Benda	13.450	12.850	26.300
9	Germany			23.550
9	Kim Bui	9.800		9.800
9	Felix Remuta	13.750		13.750
10	United States			14.850
10	Olivia Greaves	– (Note: Greaves was injured during warm-up and did not compete.)		–
10	Yul Moldauer	14.850		14.850

the team advanced to the semi-finals

=== Semi-finals ===
Rank	Name	Scores	Total
Russia vs Italy
1	Russia		28.300
1	Angelina Melnikova	13.800	28.300
1	Nikita Nagornyy	14.500	28.300
2	Italy		26.400
2	Alice D'Amato	12.750	26.400
2	Stefano Patron	13.650	26.400
Switzerland vs Ukraine
1	Ukraine		27.400
1	Yelyzaveta Hubareva	13.100	27.400
1	Illia Kovtun	14.300	27.400
2	Switzerland 2		25.900
2	Lena Bickel	12.650	25.900
2	Noe Seifert	13.250	25.900

the team advanced to the finals

=== Finals ===
Rank	Name	Scores	Total
Championships
1st place, gold medalist(s)	Russia		28.400
1st place, gold medalist(s)	Angelina Melnikova	14.550	28.400
1st place, gold medalist(s)	Nikita Nagornyy	13.850	28.400
2nd place, silver medalist(s)	Ukraine		26.150
2nd place, silver medalist(s)	Yelyzaveta Hubareva	11.250	26.150
2nd place, silver medalist(s)	Illia Kovtun	14.900	26.150
Third place
3rd place, bronze medalist(s)	Italy		28.400
3rd place, bronze medalist(s)	Alice D'Amato	14.150	28.400
3rd place, bronze medalist(s)	Stefano Patron	14.250	28.400
4	Switzerland 2		25.450
4	Lena Bickel	12.250	25.450
4	Noe Seifert	13.200	25.450
