= The Eleven O'Clock =

- Poster
- Directed by: Derin Seale
- Written by: Josh Lawson
- Produced by: Karen Bryson; Josh Lawson; Derin Seale
- Starring: Josh Lawson; Damon Herriman
- Cinematography: Matt Toll
- Edited by: Drew Thompson
- Music by: Adrian Sergovich
- Production company: FINCH
- Release date: September 6, 2016 (Los Angeles Short Film Festival)
- Running time: 13 minutes
- Country: Australia
- Language: English

The Eleven O'Clock is a 2016 Australian live-action short film directed by Derin Seale. It was inspired by a sketch from the television series A Bit of Fry and Laurie. It was nominated for an Academy Award for Best Live Action Short Film at the 90th Academy Awards in 2018.

== Plot ==
A session between a psychiatrist and his patient, delusively believing he is the psychiatrist, gets out of hand.

== Cast ==
- Josh Lawson as Terry Phillips
- Damon Herriman as Nathan Klein
- Jessica Donoghue as Linda
- Gregory J. Thorsby as Security Guard
- Eliza Logan as Daisy
- Alyssa McClelland as Donna

== Reception ==
=== Critical response ===
The Eleven O'Clock has an approval rating of 100% on review aggregator website Rotten Tomatoes, based on 10 reviews, and an average rating of 8.80/10 among all critics. On IMDb, the short holds a review score of 7.6, with 960 votes.

=== Awards and nominations ===
- Nominated: Academy Award for Best Live Action Short Film
- Won: Australian Academy of Cinema and Television Arts (AACTA) Award for Best Short Fiction Film
