= Ece Yağmur Yavuz =

Turkish artistic gymnast

- Born: 17 February 2004 (age 22) Buca, İzmir, Turkey

Gymnastics career
- Discipline: Women's artistic gymnastics
- Country represented: Turkey
- Club: Şavkar CSK

Ece Yağmur Yavuz (born 17 February 2004) is a Turkish former artistic gymnast. She competed at the 2020 European Championships in Mersin, Turkey, and at the 2018 Junior European Championships. She is the 2018 Turkish Championships junior all-around silver medalist.

== Gymnastics career ==
Yavuz grew up in Bornova and trained gymnastics at Şavkar CSK in Gaziemir, İzmir.

Yavuz won the silver medal in the junior all-around at the 2018 Turkish Championships, behind Nazlı Savranbaşı. At the 2018 Gym Festival Trnava in Slovakia, she placed tenth in the all-around. She and the Turkish team finished 13th at the 2018 Junior European Championships.

Yavuz only competed on the balance beam and floor exercise at the 2019 Turkish Championships and did not advance into either apparatus final. Then at the 2019 Gym Festival Trnava, she placed seventh in the all-around and finished fourth in the vault final.

Yavuz became age-eligible for senior competitions in 2020. At the 2020 Turkish Championships, she only competed on the uneven bars and balance beam and finished sixth in the uneven bars final. She competed at the 2020 European Championships alongside Cemre Kendirci, Göksu Üçtaş Şanlı, Dilara Yurtdaş, and Bilge Tarhan, and they finished fourth in the team final.

Yavuz only competed on the vault at the 2021 Varna World Challenge Cups and finished 13th in the qualifications. At the 2021 Turkish Team Championships, she won a silver medal with the Şavkar CSK team. Individually, she placed seventh in the all-around and fifth on the uneven bars. She finished tenth in the all-around and eighth in the balance beam final at the 2022 Turkish Championships. This was the final competition of her career.
