= Maria Ceplinschi =

Romanian artistic gymnast

- Full name: Maria Sorana Ceplinschi
- Nickname: Mara
- Born: 12 August 2005 (age 21) Constanța, Romania

Gymnastics career
- Discipline: Women's artistic gymnastics
- Country represented: Romania (2018–present)
- Club: Farul Constanta
- Head coach: Lucian Sandu
- Assistant coach: Gina Gogean
- Former coach: Carmen Traicu
Medal record
Women's artistic gymnastics
Representing Romania
FIG World Cup
Event	1st	2nd	3rd
World Challenge Cup	2	0	0

Maria Sorana Ceplinschi (born 12 August 2005) is a Romanian artistic gymnast.

== Career ==
=== Junior ===
At the 2019 Romanian Junior Championships, Ceplinschi won silver medals on both vault and floor exercise, and she finished fourth in the all-around. Then at the Senior Romanian Championships, she finished twelfth in the all-around, fifth on vault, and seventh on floor exercise. Then at the Horizon Cup, Ceplinschi won gold medals on every event except for the vault.

At the 2020 Romanian Championships, Ceplinschi only competed on vault and uneven bars, and she finished fourth in both event finals. She competed at the 2020 Junior European Championships, and the Romanian team won the gold medal by more than ten points ahead of Ukraine and Hungary. Individually, Ceplinschi won the silver medal in the all-around and on the floor exercise, both behind her teammate Ana Bărbosu.

=== Senior ===
Ceplinschi made her senior international debut at the 2021 European Championships. She was initially the first reserve for the floor exercise event final, but when Larisa Iordache withdrew due to health issues, Ceplinschi was added. She finished fifth with a score of 12.966. At the Mersin Challenge Cup, she won the gold medal on both the balance beam and the floor exercise. She competed at the 2021 World Artistic Gymnastics Championships and qualified for the all-around and floor finals. She finished 16th in the all-around and 6th on floor.

== Competitive history ==
Competitive history of Maria Ceplinschi at the junior level
Year	Event	Team	AA	VT	UB	BB	FX
2017	Junior Romanian Championships		4	3rd place, bronze medalist(s)			2nd place, silver medalist(s)
2019	Gym Festival Trnava		4	3rd place, bronze medalist(s)		2nd place, silver medalist(s)	3rd place, bronze medalist(s)
2019	Petrom Cup		3rd place, bronze medalist(s)				
2019	Junior Romanian Championships		4				
2019	Romanian Championships		12	5			7
2019	Romanian Individual Championships		1st place, gold medalist(s)	2nd place, silver medalist(s)	1st place, gold medalist(s)	1st place, gold medalist(s)	1st place, gold medalist(s)
2019	Horizon Cup		1st place, gold medalist(s)				
2019	Top Gym		8	2nd place, silver medalist(s)			
2020	Romanian Championships			4	4		
2020	Junior European Championships	1st place, gold medalist(s)	2nd place, silver medalist(s)				2nd place, silver medalist(s)

Competitive history of Maria Ceplinschi at the senior level
Year	Event	Team	AA	VT	UB	BB	FX
2021
2021	European Championships						5
2021	FIT Challenge	8	23				2nd place, silver medalist(s)
2021	Mersin World Challenge Cup					1st place, gold medalist(s)	1st place, gold medalist(s)
2021	World Championships		16				6
2022	City of Jesolo Trophy	4	12				4
2023	RomGym Trophy	3rd place, bronze medalist(s)					
2023	Romanian Championships		8				2nd place, silver medalist(s)
2024
2024	European Championships	4					
2024	RomGym Trophy		14				
2026
2026	European Championships	11					
