= Derin Seale =

Australian filmmaker

- Occupation(s): Director, screenwriter, editor, producer
- Years active: 1987–present

Derin Seale is an Australian filmmaker, best known for his film, The Eleven O'Clock for which he received an Academy Award for Best Live Action Short Film nomination at the 90th Academy Awards.

== Filmography ==
- 2016: The Eleven O'Clock (Short, director, producer)
- 2003: Cold Mountain (second unit director - as Derin A. Seale)
- 2000: Tulip (Short, editor)
- 1999: The Talented Mr. Ripley (thanks)
- 1998: Static (Short) (writer)
- 1996: The English Patient (video playback operator)
- 1989: Dead Poets Society (thanks)
- 1987: Sons and Daughters (TV Series, actor)
