= Angelina Radivilova =

Ukrainian artistic gymnast

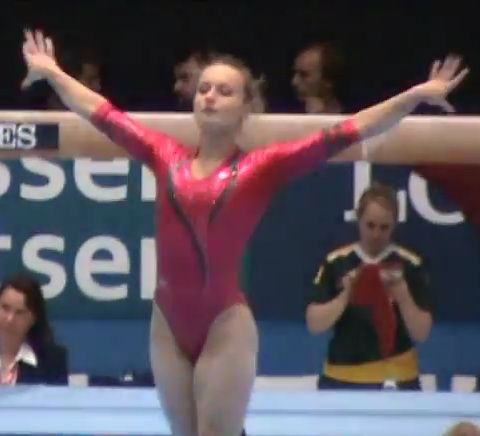
- Radivilova at the 2013 World Championships

Personal information
- Full name: Angelina Anatoliyivna Radivilova
- Alternative name: Angelina Kysla
- Born: 15 February 1991 (age 35) Kiev, Ukrainian SSR, Soviet Union
- Height: 5 ft 2 in (157 cm)
- Spouse: Igor Radivilov (m. 2016)

Gymnastics career
- Discipline: Women's artistic gymnastics
- Country represented: Ukraine
- Club: Dynamo
- Retired: 2020
Medal record
Representing Ukraine
European Championships
| Gold medal – first place | 2020 Mersin | Team |
Summer Universiade
| Silver medal – second place | 2011 Shenzhen | Team |
| Bronze medal – third place | 2011 Shenzhen | Uneven Bars |

Angelina Anatoliyivna Radivilova (née Kysla (Кисла); Ukrainian: Ангеліна Анатоліївна Радівілова; born 15 February 1991) is a Ukrainian former artistic gymnast. She competed at the 2016 Summer Olympics and also competed at the World Artistic Gymnastics Championships in 2011, 2013, 2014, 2015, 2017, 2018, and 2019.

== Personal life ==
Radivilova was born on 15 February 1991 in Kiev. On 4 September 2016, she married fellow Ukrainian gymnast Igor Radivilov.

== Senior career ==
Radivilova made her international senior debut in 2007.

Radivilova and her compatriot Natalia Kononenko qualified for the 2012 Summer Olympics through the test event held in January 2012. However, the National Olympic Committee ruled that only Kononenko could compete in London.

Radivilova won a bronze medal at the Osijek World Cup in 2013. At the 3rd Mexico Open in Acapulco on 30 November 2013, Radivilova finished fifth all-around with an overall score of 53.700. She was chosen by an expert panel as the most elegant gymnast in the competition and was awarded with a white Swarovski leotard worth approximately $10,000. Radivilova competed in this leotard at the 4th Mexico Open in December 2014, placing fifth all-around with an overall score of 52.70. She won a silver medal with Oleg Verniaiev at the Swiss Cup in 2014.

At the 2015 European Games, Radivilova finished 14th in the all-around.

Radivilova competed for Ukraine at the 2016 Summer Olympics, having qualified through the test event held in April. She placed 47th in qualification with an overall score of 52.223.

At the 2017 Baku World Cup, Radivilova finished fifth on uneven bars. At the 2017 Cottbus World Cup, she finished eighth on uneven bars.

At the 2018 Osijek World Challenge Cup, Radivilova finished sixth on vault and eighth on floor. At the 2018 Paris World Challenge Cup, she finished eighth on vault.

At the 2019 Cottbus World Cup, Radivilova finished eighth on vault and eighth on floor. At the 2019 Osijek World Challenge Cup, she won the silver medal on vault, finished fourth on bars, and won the gold medal on balance beam. At the 2019 Szombathely World Challenge Cup, she won the bronze medal on vault.

At the 2020 Melbourne World Cup, Radivilova finished fourth on vault. At the 2020 Szombathely World Challenge Cup, she won the bronze medal on vault and the gold medal on floor. At the 2020 European Championships, she won a gold medal with Ukraine in the team competition and finished sixth on floor. Radivilova then retired from competition and became a gymnastics coach.

== See also ==
- List of Olympic female artistic gymnasts for Ukraine
