= Derin Tanrıyaşükür =

Turkish artistic gymnast (born 2006)

- Born: 21 October 2006 (age 19) Kadıköy, Istanbul, Turkey

Gymnastics career
- Discipline: Women's artistic gymnastics
- Country represented: Turkey (2019–present)
- College team: Alabama Crimson Tide (2026–2029)
- Club: Istanbul BS BLD SK
Medal record
Women's artistic gymnastics
Representing Turkey
Junior European Championships
Bronze medal – third place	2020 Mersin	Uneven bars

Derin Tanrıyaşükür (born 21 October 2006) is a Turkish artistic gymnast. She won a bronze medal on the uneven bars at the 2020 Junior European Championships.

== Gymnastics career ==
=== Junior ===
In 2019, Tanrıyaşükür won gold medals on the uneven bars and floor exercise and the bronze medal in the all-around at the Züri-Oberland Cup in Switzerland. At the 2020 Turkish Championships, she won the junior all-around bronze medal. She competed with the Turkish team that finished fourth at the 2020 Junior European Championships in Mersin. Then, in the uneven bars final, she won a bronze medal behind Ana Bărbosu and Sara Šulekić. She only competed on the balance beam at the 2021 Turkish Championships and won the silver medal behind Bengisu Yildiz.

=== Senior ===
Tanrıyaşükür became age-eligible for senior international competitions in 2022. She competed at the 2022 Gymnasiade and won a bronze medal with the Turkish team. She then won a bronze medal in the all-around at the Turkish Championships. In the event finals, she won silver medals on the uneven bars and floor exercise and a bronze medal on the balance beam. She advanced to the uneven bars final at the Mersin World Challenge Cup and finished fifth.

Tanrıyaşükür competed with the Turkish team that finished 14th at the 2023 European Championships. Then at the Varna World Challenge Cup, she finished sixth in the uneven bars final. She then placed eighth on the uneven bars at the Mersin World Challenge Cup. She competed on the uneven bars at the 2023 World Championships and did not advance beyond the qualification round.

Tanrıyaşükür won the all-around silver medal at the 2024 Turkish Team Championships. In the event finals, she won the gold medal on the floor exercise and the silver medal on the balance beam. She finished 39th in the all-around at the 2024 European Championships and helped the Turkish team finish 21st.

Tanrıyaşükür committed to join the Alabama Crimson Tide gymnastics team starting in the 2026 season.

== Competitive history ==
Competitive history of Derin Tanrıyaşükür at the junior level
Year	Event	Team	AA	VT	UB	BB	FX
2019
2019	Züri-Oberland Cup		3rd place, bronze medalist(s)		1st place, gold medalist(s)		1st place, gold medalist(s)
2020
2020	Turkish Championships		3rd place, bronze medalist(s)		8		
2020	Junior European Championships	4			3rd place, bronze medalist(s)		
2021
2021	Turkish Championships					2nd place, silver medalist(s)	

Competitive history of Derin Tanrıyaşükür at the senior level
Year	Event	Team	AA	VT	UB	BB	FX
2022
2022	Gymnasiade	3rd place, bronze medalist(s)					8
2022	Turkish Championships		3rd place, bronze medalist(s)		2nd place, silver medalist(s)	3rd place, bronze medalist(s)	2nd place, silver medalist(s)
2022	Mersin World Challenge Cup				5		
2023
2023	European Championships	14					
2023	Varna World Challenge Cup				6		
2023	Mersin World Challenge Cup				8		
2024
2024	Turkish Team Championships		2nd place, silver medalist(s)			2nd place, silver medalist(s)	1st place, gold medalist(s)
2024	European Championships	21	39				
