= Bettina Lili Czifra =

Hungarian artistic gymnast (born 2007)

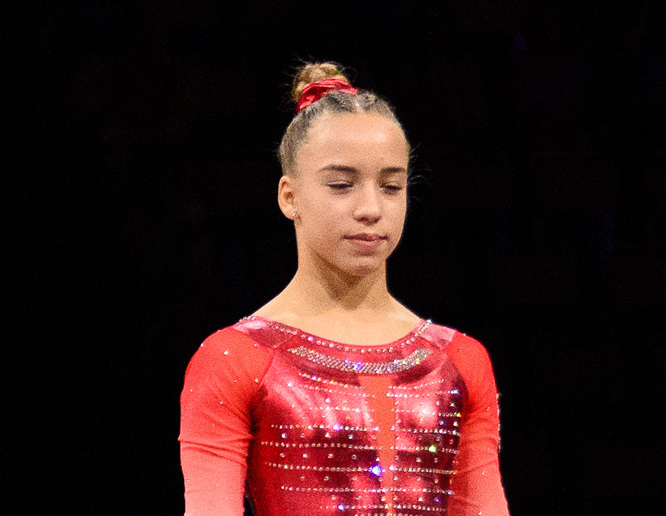
- Czifra at the 2022 European Championships

Personal information
- Full name: Bettina Lili Czifra
- Nickname: Lili
- Born: 20 April 2007 (age 19) Budapest, Hungary

Gymnastics career
- Discipline: Women's artistic gymnastics
- Country represented: Hungary; (2021–present)
- Club: DKSE
- Head coaches: Janos Trenka (club); Imre Draskoczy (national team)
Medal record
Artistic gymnastics
Representing Hungary
European Championships
Silver medal – second place	2025 Leipzig	Uneven bars
FIG World Cup
Event	1st	2nd	3rd
World Challenge Cup	1	1	1
Total	1	1	1

Bettina Lili Czifra (born 20 April 2007) is a Hungarian artistic gymnast. She is the 2025 European silver medalist on the uneven bars and is the 2023 Hungarian all-around champion. She represented Hungary at the 2024 Summer Olympics.

== Early life ==
Bettina Lili Czifra was born in Budapest, Hungary, on 20 April 2007. She began gymnastics when she was nine years old.

== Junior gymnastics career ==
=== 2021 ===
Czifra began the 2021 season at the Hungarian Super Team Championships, helping her club win the gold medal. Then at the Junior Hungarian Event Championships, she won silver on uneven bars and bronze on balance beam. She then won the all-around bronze medal at the Junior Hungarian Championships where she also won the uneven bars title. She made her international debut at the Gym Festival Trnava, winning the all-around silver medal behind Slovakia's Lucia Dobrocka. In the event finals, she won gold on floor exercise, silver on balance beam, and bronze on uneven bars. Then at the Olympic Hopes Cup held in Liberec, Czech Republic, she won the all-around bronze medal and helped the Hungarian team win the gold medal.

=== 2022 ===
Czifra began the season at the Elek Matolay Memorial where she won the all-around gold medal. She then won the all-around silver medal at the Tata Junior Friendly behind Romania's Gabriela Vănoagă. She won the all-around, uneven bars, balance beam, and floor exercise titles at the Junior Hungarian Championships. She also won the all-around gold medal at the Salamunov Memorial, helping the Hungarian team win the gold medal.

Czifra competed at the European Youth Olympic Festival where she finished twelfth in the all-around. She next competed at the Junior European Championships where she once again placed twelfth in the all-around. Additionally, she qualified for the balance beam where she finished seventh. At the Vera Caslavska Grand Prix, she helped the Hungarian team win the bronze medal, and she won silver on uneven bars and bronze on floor exercise. She finished the season at the Hungarian Masters Championships, where she won the all-around silver medal behind Gréta Mayer. In the event finals, she won the gold medal on floor exercise and the bronze medal on uneven bars.

== Senior gymnastics career ==
=== 2023 ===
Czifra became age-eligible for senior competition in 2023. At the Hungarian Team Championships, she helped her club finish second, and she finished third in the all-around. Then at the Elek Matolay Memorial, she won the all-around silver medal behind teammate Gréta Mayer. She competed at the European Championships where she helped Hungary finish fourth as a team. At the Varna World Challenge Cup, she won her first FIG World Cup medal- a gold on balance beam. Then at the Szombathely World Challenge Cup, she won silver on floor exercise and bronze on uneven bars. She won the all-around, balance beam, and floor exercise titles at the Hungarian Championships.

Czifra competed at the World Championships alongside Csenge Bácskay, Gréta Mayer, Zója Székely, and Nikolett Szilágyi; they finished fifteenth as a team during qualifications. Individually, Czifra was the third reserve for the all-around final. Although the Hungarian team did not qualify a full team to the 2024 Olympic Games, Czifra earned an individual berth as the highest placing Hungarian gymnast and sixth highest placing all-arounder not part of a qualified team. She finished her season at the Hungarian Masters Championships, where she won gold medals on balance beam and floor exercise.

=== 2024 ===
Czifra competed at the 2024 Olympic Games. She qualified to the individual all-around final where she ultimately finished twenty-first.

=== 2025 ===
In May 2025, Czifra competed at the 2025 European Championships, competing on vault, uneven bars, and balance beam. She qualified for the uneven bars final in seventh place. In the final, she achieved a career-high score of 14.100, winning the silver medal behind Nina Derwael of Belgium and ahead of Ana Bărbosu of Romania.

Czifra was part of the Hungarian team at the 2025 World Championships, alongside teammates Zója Székely and Gréta Mayer. She competed on uneven bars and was third reserve for the uneven bars final.

== Competitive history ==
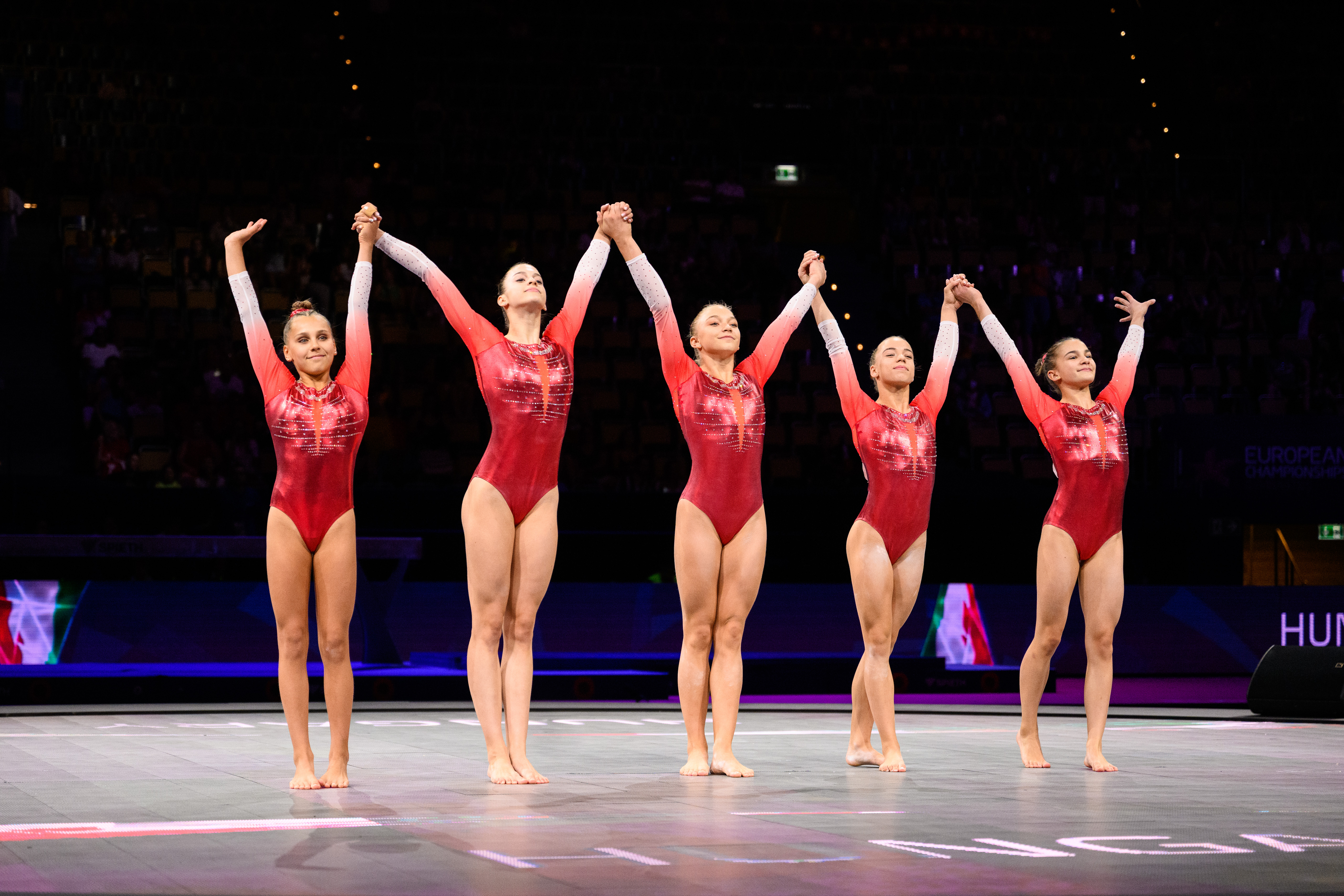
Czifra (second from the right) with the Hungarian team at the 2022 Junior European Championships

Competitive history of Bettina Lili Czifra at the junior level
Year	Event	Team	AA	VT	UB	BB	FX
2020	Hungarian Championships		5			2nd place, silver medalist(s)	3rd place, bronze medalist(s)
2021	Hungarian Super Team Championships	1st place, gold medalist(s)	9				
2021	Hungarian Event Championships				2nd place, silver medalist(s)	3rd place, bronze medalist(s)	4
2021	Hungarian Junior Championships		3rd place, bronze medalist(s)		1st place, gold medalist(s)	6	2nd place, silver medalist(s)
2021	Gym Festival Trnava		2nd place, silver medalist(s)		3rd place, bronze medalist(s)	2nd place, silver medalist(s)	1st place, gold medalist(s)
2021	Olympic Hopes Cup	1st place, gold medalist(s)	3rd place, bronze medalist(s)				
2022	Elek Matolay Memorial		1st place, gold medalist(s)		1st place, gold medalist(s)	2nd place, silver medalist(s)	2nd place, silver medalist(s)
2022	Tata Junior Friendly	2nd place, silver medalist(s)	2nd place, silver medalist(s)				
2022	Hungarian Junior Championships		1st place, gold medalist(s)	8	1st place, gold medalist(s)	1st place, gold medalist(s)	1st place, gold medalist(s)
2022	Salamunov Memorial	1st place, gold medalist(s)	1st place, gold medalist(s)	2nd place, silver medalist(s)	1st place, gold medalist(s)		1st place, gold medalist(s)
2022	European Youth Olympic Festival	10	12				
2022	European Championships	9	12			7	
2022	Věra Čáslavská Grand Prix	3rd place, bronze medalist(s)	5		2nd place, silver medalist(s)		3rd place, bronze medalist(s)
2022	Hungarian Masters Championships		2nd place, silver medalist(s)		3rd place, bronze medalist(s)	6	1st place, gold medalist(s)

Competitive history of Bettina Lili Czifra at the senior level
Year	Event	Team	AA	VT	UB	BB	FX
2023	Hungarian Team Championships	2nd place, silver medalist(s)	3rd place, bronze medalist(s)		3rd place, bronze medalist(s)	2nd place, silver medalist(s)	9
2023	Elek Matolay Memorial		2nd place, silver medalist(s)		2nd place, silver medalist(s)		2nd place, silver medalist(s)
2023	European Championships	4					
2023	Varna World Challenge Cup					1st place, gold medalist(s)	
2023	Szombathely World Challenge Cup				3rd place, bronze medalist(s)	8	2nd place, silver medalist(s)
2023	Hungarian Championships		1st place, gold medalist(s)		3rd place, bronze medalist(s)	1st place, gold medalist(s)	1st place, gold medalist(s)
2023	World Championships	15	R3				
2023	Hungarian Masters Championships				4	1st place, gold medalist(s)	1st place, gold medalist(s)
2024	RomGym Trophy		9			4	5
2024	Olympic Games		21				
2025
2025	European Championships	8			2nd place, silver medalist(s)		
2025	World Championships	—N/a			R3		
2026
2026	European Championships	14					
2026	Szombathely World Challenge Cup				6		
