= Hungary women's national artistic gymnastics team =

National sports team

Hungary
- Continental union: European Union of Gymnastics

Olympic Games
- Medals: Silver: 1948, 1952, 1956; Bronze: 1936, 1972
- Appearances: 12

World Championships
- Medals: Silver: 1934, 1954; Bronze: 1974

European Championships
- Medals: Bronze: 2020

The Hungary women's national artistic gymnastics team represents Hungary in FIG international competitions.

== History ==
Hungary has won the silver medal in the Olympic team competition three-times: 1948, 1952, and 1956.

== Senior roster ==
Name	Birth date and age	Hometown
Csenge Bácskay	April 14, 2003 (age 23)	Budapest
Dorina Böczögő	February 15, 1992 (age 34)	Orosháza
Bettina Lili Czifra	April 20, 2007 (age 19)	Dunaújváros
Boglárka Dévai	November 12, 1999 (age 27)	Szombathely
Zsófia Kovács	April 6, 2000 (age 26)	Dunaújváros
Mirtill Makovits	March 30, 2004 (age 22)	Dunaújváros
Gréta Mayer	September 26, 2006 (age 20)	Dunaújváros
Sára Péter	July 6, 2002 (age 24)	Budapest
Bianka Schermann	June 26, 2003 (age 23)	Budapest
Zója Székely	May 5, 2003 (age 23)	Budapest
Nikolett Szilágyi	September 25, 2005 (age 21)	Debrecen
Hanna Szujó	February 15, 2004 (age 22)	Békéscsaba

== Team competition results ==
=== Olympic Games ===
Year	Position	Squad
1936	bronze medal	Margit Csillik, Margit Kalocsai, Ilona Madary, Gabriella Mészáros, Margit Nagy-Sándor, Olga Törös, Judit Tóth, Eszter Voit
1948	silver medal	Erzsébet Balázs, Irén Daruházi-Karcsics, Anna Fehér, Erzsébet Gulyás-Köteles, Margit Nagy-Sándor, Edit Perényi-Weckinger, Olga Tass, Mária Zalai-Kövi
1952	silver medal	Irén Daruházi-Karcsics, Erzsébet Gulyás-Köteles, Ágnes Keleti, Margit Korondi, Andrea Molnár-Bodó, Edit Perényi-Weckinger, Olga Tass, Mária Zalai-Kövi
1956	silver medal	Erzsébet Gulyás-Köteles, Ágnes Keleti, Alice Kertész, Margit Korondi, Andrea Molnár-Bodó, Olga Tass
1960	7th place	Mária Bencsik, Anikó Ducza, Klára Förstner, Judit Füle, Katalin Müller, Olga Tass
1964	5th place	Anikó Ducza, Gyöngyi Mák-Kovács, Katalin Makray, Katalin Müller, Márta Tolnai, Mária Tressel
1968	5th place	Ágnes Bánfai, Ilona Békési, Anikó Ducza, Katalin Makray, Katalin Müller, Márta Tolnai
1972	bronze medal	Ilona Békési, Mónika Császár, Márta Kelemen, Anikó Kéry, Krisztina Medveczky, Zsuzsa Nagy
1976	4th place	Márta Egervári, Márta Kelemen, Mária Lővey, Krisztina Medveczky, Éva Óvári, Margit Tóth
1980	5th place	Lenke Almási, Erika Csányi, Márta Egervári, Erika Flander, Erzsébet Hanti, Éva Óvári
1984	—N/a	did not participate due to boycott
1988	8th place	Zsuzsa Csisztu, Andrea Ladányi, Ágnes Miskó, Zsuzsanna Miskó, Eszter Óváry, Beáta Storczer
1992	6th place	Bernadett Balázs, Ildikó Balog, Kinga Horváth, Andrea Molnár, Krisztina Molnár, Henrietta Ónodi
1996	9th place	Ildikó Balog, Nikolett Krausz, Andrea Molnár, Adrienn Nyeste, Henrietta Ónodi, Eszter Óváry, Adrienn Varga

=== World Championships ===
Year	Position	Squad
1934	silver medal	
1954	silver medal	Eva Banati, Ilona Bánhegyi Milanovits, Irén Daruházi-Karcsics, Erzsébet Gulyás-Köteles, Ágnes Keleti, Alice Kertész, Edit Perényi-Weckinger, Olga Tass
1958	5th place	
1962	4th place	
1966	5th place	
1970	6th place	Ágnes Bánfai, Ilona Békési, Mária Gál, Margit Horváth, Márta Kelemen, Zsuzsa Nagy
1974	bronze medal	Ágnes Bánfai, Mónika Császár, Márta Egervári, Zsuzsa Matulai, Krisztina Medveczky, Zsuzsa Nagy
1989	9th place	
1991	8th place	
1994	11th place	
1997	10th place	
2010	23rd place	
2011	20th place	
2014	20th place	Dorina Böczögő, Tünde Csillag, Luca Diveky, Enikő Horváth, Noémi Makra, Eszter Romhányi
2015	18th place	Dorina Böczögő, Boglárka Dévai, Luca Diveky, Kitti Honti, Enikő Horváth, Noémi Makra
2018	17th place	Dorina Böczögő, Nora Feher, Zsófia Kovács, Noémi Makra, Sára Péter
2019	18th place	Dorina Böczögő, Zsófia Kovács, Noémi Makra, Sára Péter, Bianka Schermann
2022	14th place	Csenge Bácskay, Zsófia Kovács, Gréta Mayer, Zója Székely, Nikolett Szilágyi
2023	15th place	Csenge Bácskay, Bettina Lili Czifra, Gréta Mayer, Zója Székely, Nikolett Szilágyi
2026	—N/a	did not qualify full team

== Most decorated gymnasts ==
This list includes all Hungarian female artistic gymnasts who have won at least four medals at the Olympic Games or the World Artistic Gymnastics Championships combined or at least one individual medal. Medals won in the Team Portable Apparatus at the 1952 or 1956 Olympic Games are located under the Team column and are designated with an asterisk (*).

Rank	Gymnast	Team	AA	VT	UB	BB	FX	Olympic Total	World Total	Total
1	Ágnes Keleti	1956*; 1952; 1956; 1952*; 1954	1956		1956; 1952; 1954	1956; 1954	1952; 1956	10	3	13
2	Margit Korondi	1956*; 1952; 1956; 1952*	1952		1952	1952	1952	8	0	8
3	Olga Tass	1956*; 1948; 1952; 1956; 1952*; 1954		1956				6	1	7
4	Erzsébet Gulyás-Köteles	1956*; 1948; 1952; 1956; 1952*; 1954						5	1	6
5	Henrietta Ónodi			1992; 1992; 1991			1992; 1992	2	3	5
6	Andrea Molnár-Bodó	1956*; 1952; 1956; 1952*						4	0	4
7	Edit Perényi-Weckinger	1948; 1952; 1952*; 1954						3	1	4
8	Margit Kalocsai	1936; 1934	1934					1	2	3
9	Anikó Ducza					1962	1964	1	1	2
9	Márta Egervári	1974			1976			1	1	2
11	Katalin Makray				1964			1	0	1

== Hall of Famers ==
The following Hungarian gymnasts have been inducted into the International Gymnastics Hall of Fame:

- Ágnes Keleti (2002)
- Henrietta Ónodi (2010)
- Margit Korondi (2021)
- Olga Tass (2021)

== See also ==
- List of Olympic female artistic gymnasts for Hungary
