= Gréta Mayer =

Hungarian artistic gymnast

- Full name: Gréta Mayer
- Born: 26 September 2006 (age 19) Dunaújváros, Hungary

Gymnastics career
- Discipline: Women's artistic gymnastics
- Country represented: Hungary; (2017–present)
- Club: DKSE
Medal record
Artistic gymnastics
Representing Hungary
FIG World Cup
Event	1st	2nd	3rd
Apparatus World Cup	1	0	2
World Challenge Cup	1	7	5
Total	2	7	7

Gréta Mayer (born 26 September 2006) is a Hungarian artistic gymnast. She is a three-time European junior medalist.

== Early life ==
Gréta Mayer was born in Dunaújváros, Hungary on 26 September 2006.

== Gymnastics career ==
=== Espoir: 2017–19 ===
Mayer competed at the 2017 Tournoi International where she placed third in the all-around behind Italians Angela Andreoli and Giulia Messali. She next competed at the Hungarian Master Championships where she placed seventh in the all-around, third on balance beam, and fourth on floor exercise.

In May 2018 Mayer competed at the Elek Matolay Memorial where she placed first in the espoir all-around and on vault, uneven bars, and balance beam. She placed sixth on floor exercise. In June she competed at Gym Festival Trnava where she placed second in the all-around behind Dagmara Pyzio of Poland.

Mayer began the 2019 season competing at the Elek Matolay Memorial where she won silver on vault and balance beam behind Sabrina Voinea and on floor exercise behind Amalia Puflea. Mayer next competed at the Hungarian Master Championships where she placed first in the all-around.

=== Junior: 2020–21 ===
Mayer competed at the 2020 Hungarian Championships where she placed first in the all-around. At the Hungarian Master Championships she placed second in the joint all-around behind senior competitor Zsófia Kovács. In December she competed at the European Championships where she helped Hungary place third as a team. Individually she placed ninth in the all-around but won silver on balance beam behind Ana Bărbosu and bronze on floor exercise behind Bărbosu and Maria Ceplinschi.

Throughout 2021 Mayer competed at the Hungarian Super Team Championships, the Hungarian Event Championships, and the Hungarian Masters Championships. Internationally she competed at the Olympic Hopes Cup in November where she helped Hungary finish first as a team and individually she placed first on floor exercise.

=== Senior: 2022 ===
Mayer turned senior in 2022. She competed at the Gymnasiade where she helped Hungary finish second as a team behind France. Individually she placed third in the all-around behind Léa Franceries and Lucie Henna and third on vault behind Franceries and Ceren Biner. She also finished seventh on floor exercise. Mayer competed at various World Challenge Cups throughout the year, winning silver medals in Varna and Szomabethely and bronze medals in Koper and Szombathely. In August Mayer competed at the European Championships alongside Zsófia Kovács, Zója Székely, Csenge Bácskay, and Mirtill Makovits. They finished seventh as a team and qualified a full team to compete at the upcoming World Championships. Individually Mayer finished 18th in the all-around.

== Competitive history ==
Competitive history of Gréta Mayer at the espoir level
Year	Event	Team	AA	VT	UB	BB	FX
2017	Tournoi International		3rd place, bronze medalist(s)	2nd place, silver medalist(s)	3rd place, bronze medalist(s)	3rd place, bronze medalist(s)	3rd place, bronze medalist(s)
2017	Hungarian Master Championships		7			3rd place, bronze medalist(s)	4
2018	Elek Matolay Memorial		1st place, gold medalist(s)	1st place, gold medalist(s)	1st place, gold medalist(s)	1st place, gold medalist(s)	6
2018	Gym Festival Trnava		5			3rd place, bronze medalist(s)	
2019	Elek Matolay Memorial			2nd place, silver medalist(s)		2nd place, silver medalist(s)	2nd place, silver medalist(s)
2019	Hungarian Master Championships		1st place, gold medalist(s)	2nd place, silver medalist(s)	1st place, gold medalist(s)	1st place, gold medalist(s)	1st place, gold medalist(s)

Competitive history of Gréta Mayer at the junior level
Year	Event	Team	AA	VT	UB	BB	FX
2020	Hungarian Championships		1st place, gold medalist(s)	2nd place, silver medalist(s)	3rd place, bronze medalist(s)	1st place, gold medalist(s)	2nd place, silver medalist(s)
2020	Hungarian Master Championships	1st place, gold medalist(s)	2nd place, silver medalist(s)	5	4	2nd place, silver medalist(s)	
2020	European Championships	3rd place, bronze medalist(s)	9			2nd place, silver medalist(s)	3rd place, bronze medalist(s)
2021	Super Team Championships	1st place, gold medalist(s)	2nd place, silver medalist(s)				
2021	Hungarian Event Championships			1st place, gold medalist(s)	3rd place, bronze medalist(s)	1st place, gold medalist(s)	1st place, gold medalist(s)
2021	Olympic Hopes Cup	1st place, gold medalist(s)					1st place, gold medalist(s)
2021	Hungarian Masters Championships					1st place, gold medalist(s)	4

Competitive history of Gréta Mayer at the senior level
Year	Event	Team	AA	VT	UB	BB	FX
2022	Elek Matolay Memorial		3rd place, bronze medalist(s)	2nd place, silver medalist(s)		1st place, gold medalist(s)	7
2022	Gymnasiade	2nd place, silver medalist(s)	3rd place, bronze medalist(s)	3rd place, bronze medalist(s)			7
2022	Varna Challenge Cup			4			2nd place, silver medalist(s)
2022	Koper Challenge Cup			4		3rd place, bronze medalist(s)	3rd place, bronze medalist(s)
2022	Austrian Team Challenge	1st place, gold medalist(s)	5				
2022	Hungarian Championships		3rd place, bronze medalist(s)	2nd place, silver medalist(s)		1st place, gold medalist(s)	1st place, gold medalist(s)
2022	European Championships	7	18				
2022	Paris Challenge Cup			8			7
2022	Szombathely Challenge Cup			3rd place, bronze medalist(s)		3rd place, bronze medalist(s)	2nd place, silver medalist(s)
2022	World Championships	14					
2023
2023	European Championships	4					
2023	Varna Challenge Cup			2nd place, silver medalist(s)			
2023	World Championships	15					
2024	Antalya Challenge Cup			3rd place, bronze medalist(s)		7	
2024	Osijek Challenge Cup			2nd place, silver medalist(s)			4
2024	Szombathely Challenge Cup			2nd place, silver medalist(s)			2nd place, silver medalist(s)
2025	Baku World Cup					3rd place, bronze medalist(s)	
2025	Antalya World Cup			6		WD	
2025	Doha World Cup			3rd place, bronze medalist(s)		1st place, gold medalist(s)	
2025	European Championships	8	14	8			
2025	Szombathely World Challenge Cup			2nd place, silver medalist(s)		3rd place, bronze medalist(s)	
2025	World Championships	—N/a	18				
2026
2026	European Championships	14		7			
2026	Szombathely World Challenge Cup			1st place, gold medalist(s)			
