= Nikolett Szilágyi =

Hungarian artistic gymnast

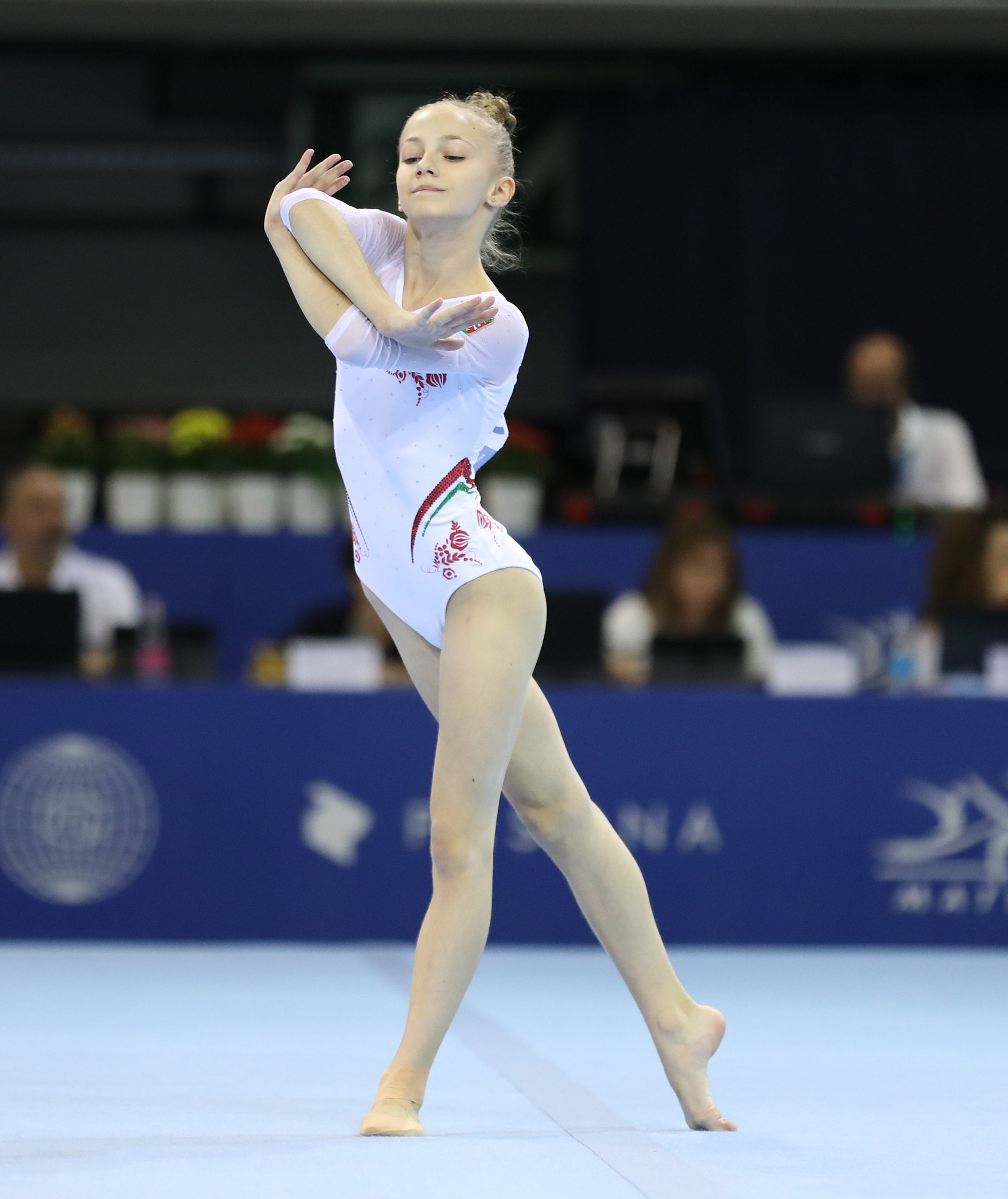
- Szilágyi at the 2019 Junior World Championships

Personal information
- Full name: Nikolett Szilágyi
- Nickname: Niki
- Born: 25 September 2005 (age 21) Debrecen, Hungary

Gymnastics career
- Discipline: Women's artistic gymnastics
- Country represented: Hungary; (2017–present)
- Club: Ujpesti Torna Egylet
- Head coaches: Jozsef Kaptay (club); Imre Draskoczy (national team)
- Assistant coach: Ildiko Harangozo
Medal record
Artistic gymnastics
Representing Hungary
FIG World Cup
| Event | 1st | 2nd | 3rd |
|---|---|---|---|
| World Challenge Cup | 0 | 1 | 1 |
| Total | 0 | 1 | 1 |

Nikolett Szilágyi (born 25 September 2005) is a Hungarian artistic gymnast who represented Hungary at the inaugural Junior World Championships.

== Early life ==
Nikolett Szilágyi was born in Debrecen, Hungary on 25 September 2005.

== Junior gymnastics career ==
=== 2017–18 ===
In April 2017 Szilágyi competed at the Elek Matolay Memorial where she placed first in the all-around in her age division.

In June 2018 Szilágyi competed at Gym Festival Trnava where she placed third in the all-around. She next competed at the Olympic Hopes Cup where she helped Hungary finish first as a team. Individually she placed fifth in the all-around, fourth on balance beam, and fifth on floor exercise.

=== 2019 ===
Szilágyi began the year competing at the Elek Matolay Memorial, International GymSport, and Gym Festival Trnava. She was selected to represent Hungary at the inaugural Junior World Championships alongside Mirtill Makovits and Hanna Szujó; they finished sixteenth as a team. Szilágyi ended the year competing at the Olympic Hopes Cup where she helped Hungary finish third. Individually she fourteenth in the all-around but won bronze on balance beam.

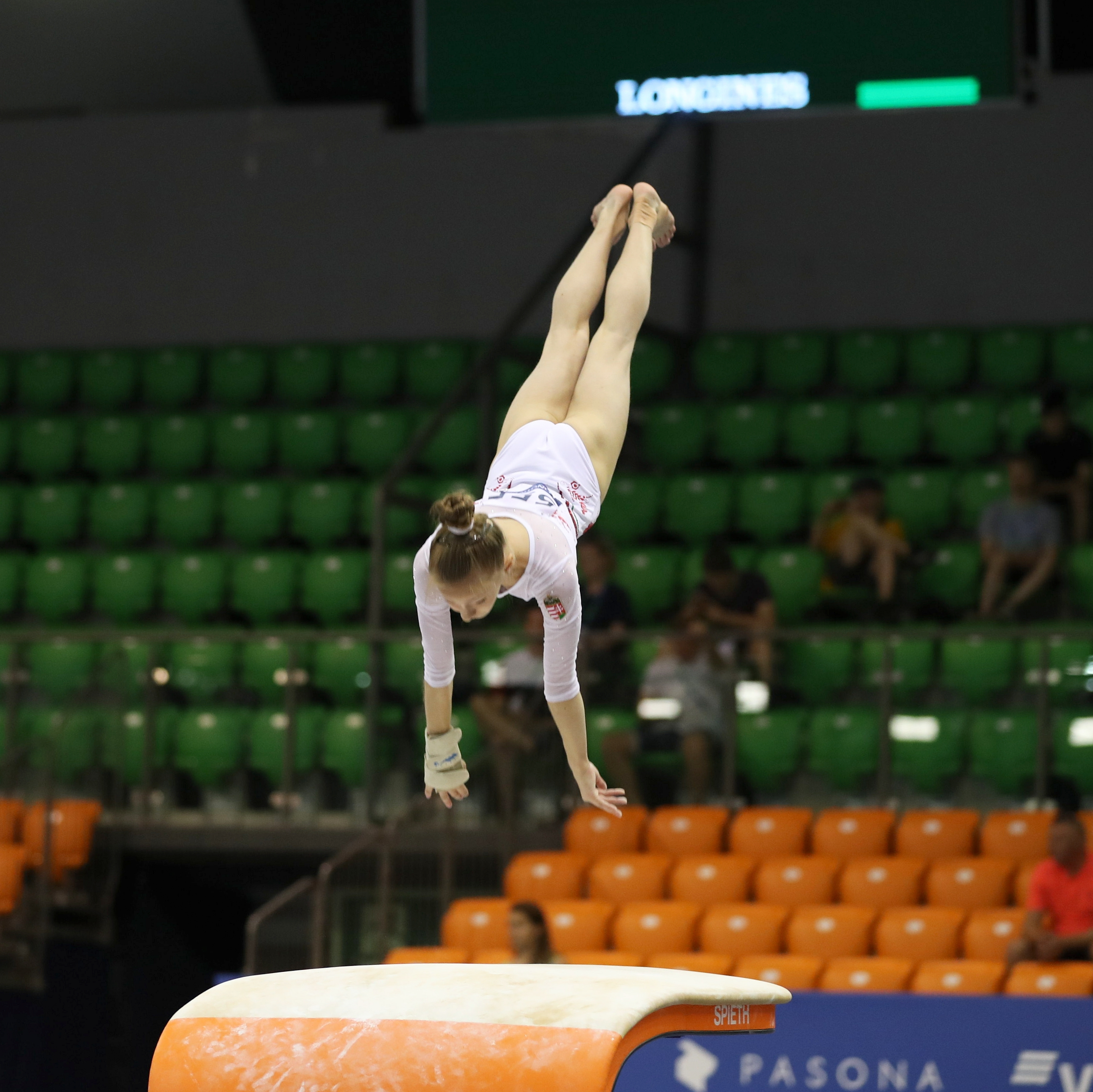
Vault

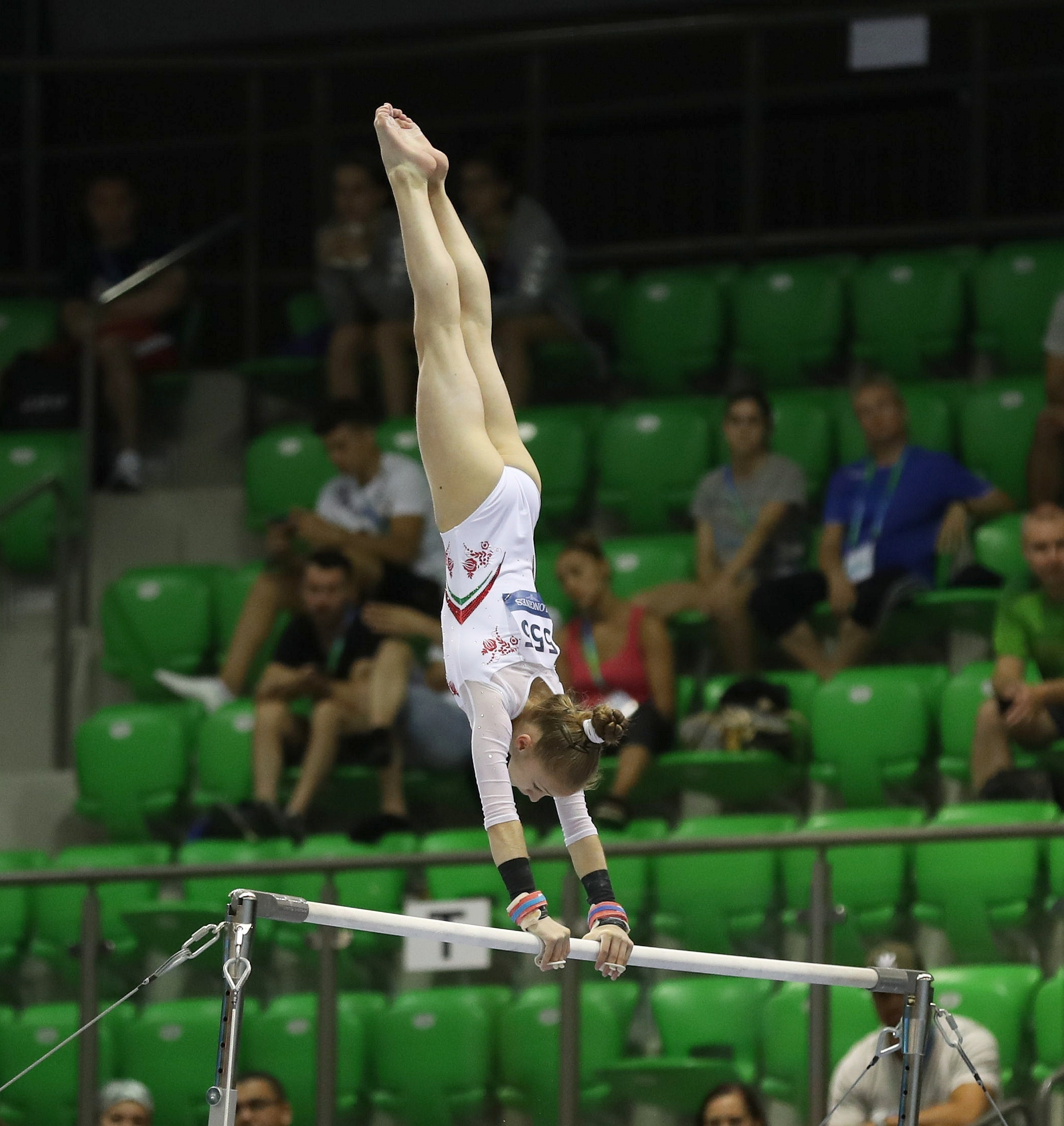
Uneven Bars

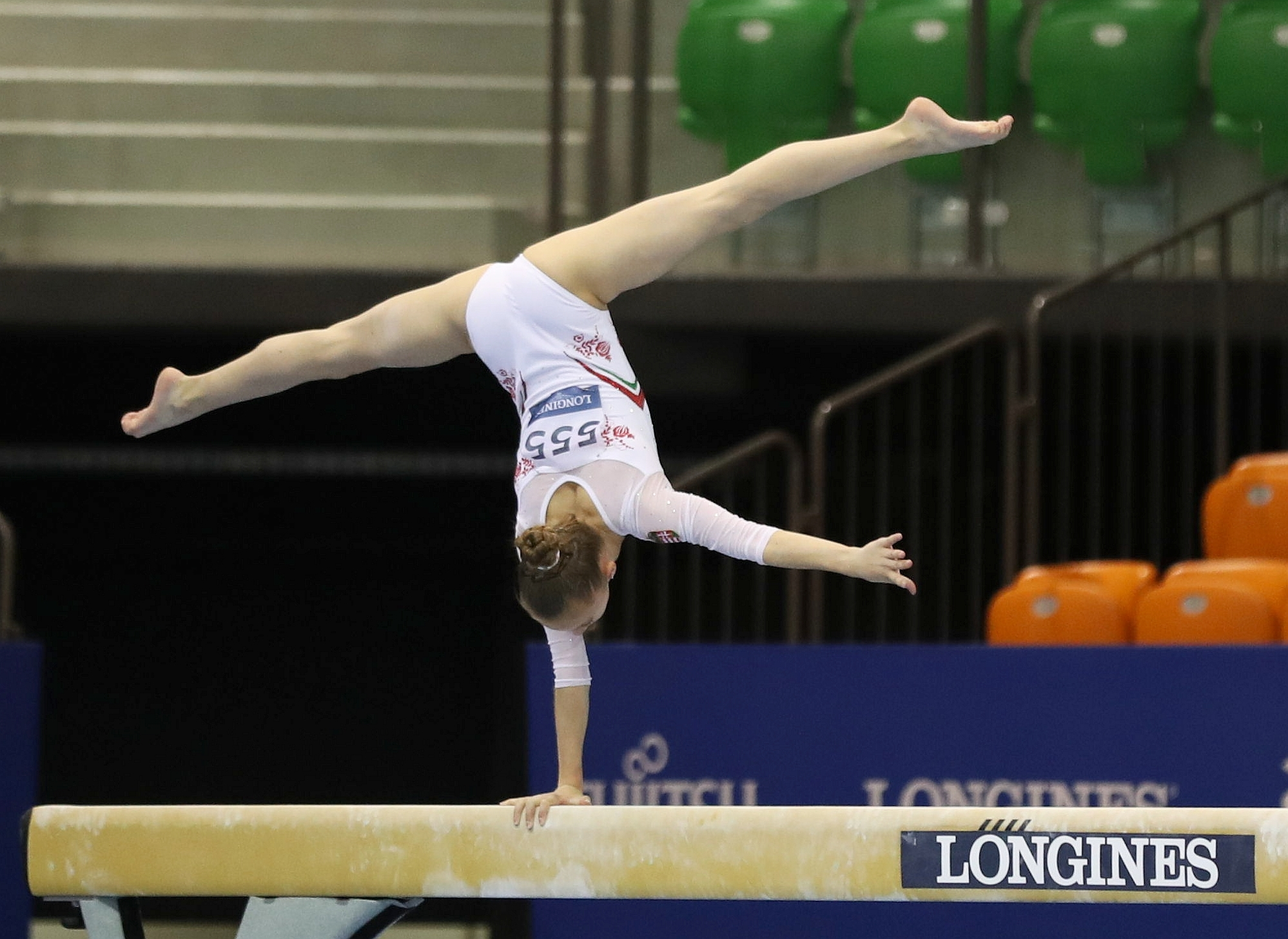
Balance Beam

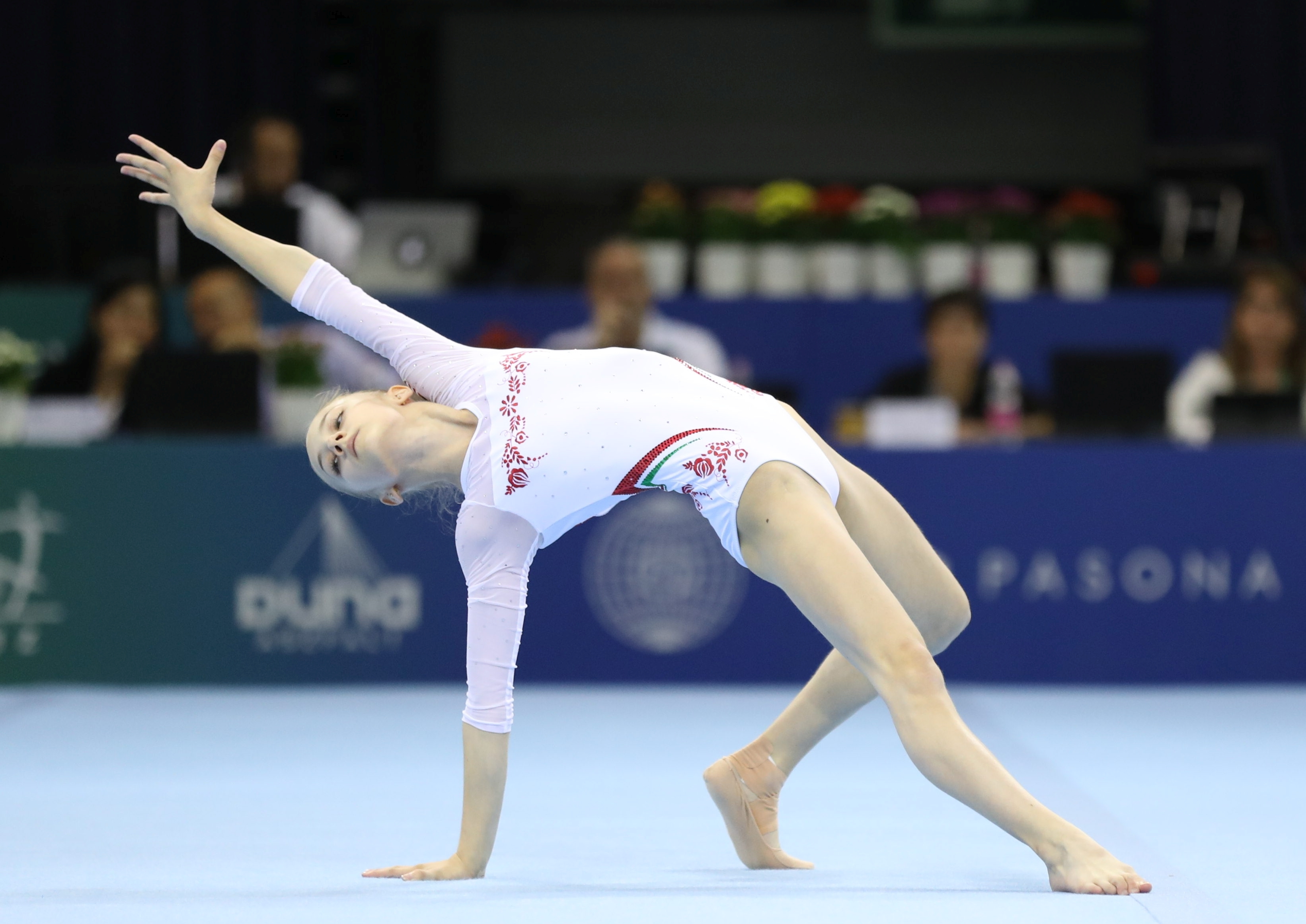
Floor Exercise

Szilágyi at the 2019 Junior World Championships

== Senior gymnastics career ==
=== 2021 ===
Szilágyi turned senior in 2021. She competed at the Hungarian Super Team Championships and the Hungarian Event Championships. At the Gym Festival Trnava Szilágyi finished first in the all-around, vault, and floor exercise and third on uneven bars and balance beam. At the Hungarian Championships she placed second in the all-around behind Dorina Böczögö. Szilágyi was selected to represent Hungary at the 2021 World Championships alongside Csenge Bácskay, Zója Székely, and Zsófia Kovács.

== Competitive history ==
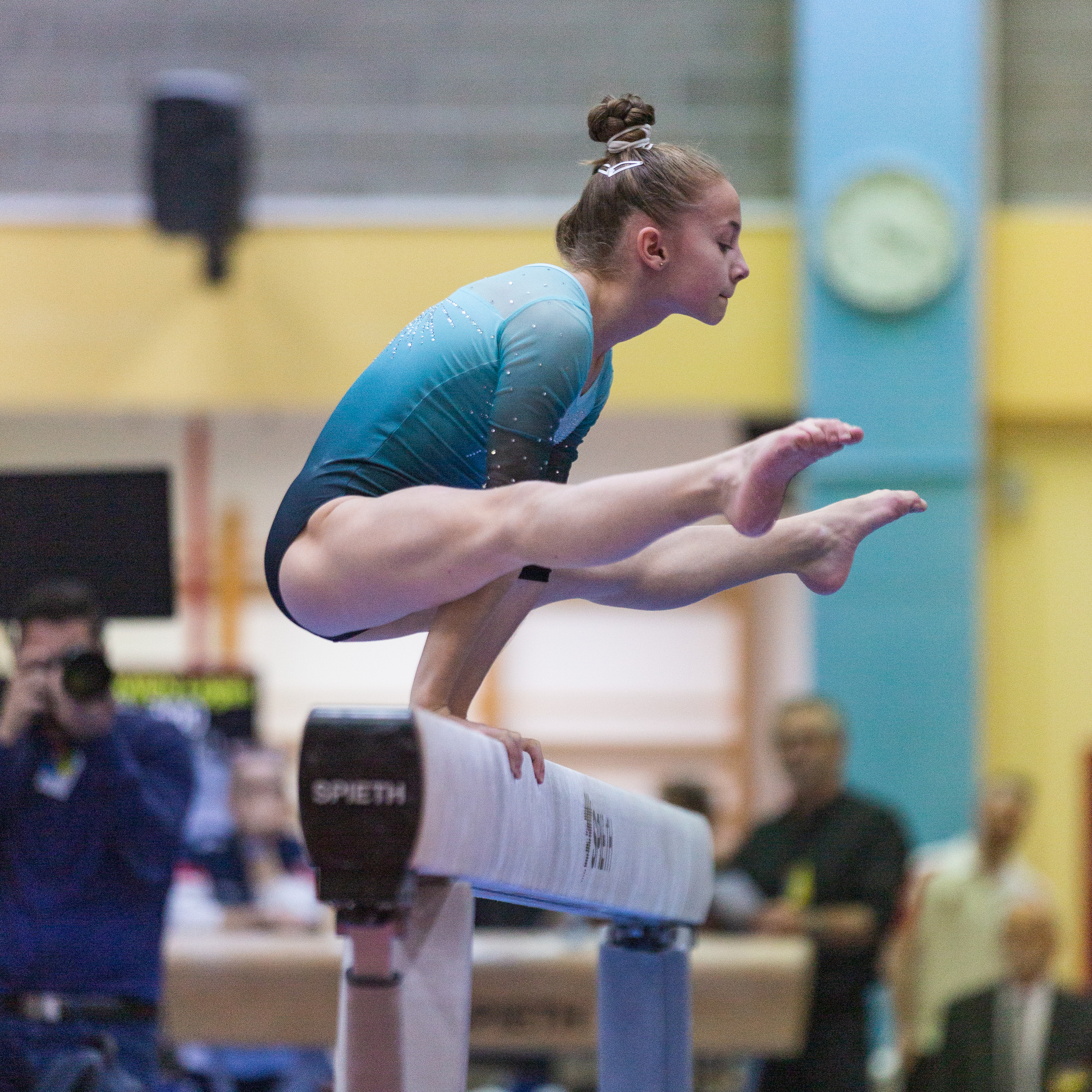
Szilágyi at the 2019 Olympic Hopes Cup

Competitive history of Nikolett Szilágyi at the junior level
| Year | Event | Team | AA | VT | UB | BB | FX |
|---|---|---|---|---|---|---|---|
| 2017 | Elek Matolay Memorial | | 1st place, gold medalist(s) | | | | |
| 2018 | Gym Festival Trnava | | 3rd place, bronze medalist(s) | | | | |
| 2018 | Olympic Hopes Cup | | 1st place, gold medalist(s) | 5 | | 4 | 5 |
| 2019 | Elek Matolay Memorial | | 2nd place, silver medalist(s) | | 8 | 1st place, gold medalist(s) | 1st place, gold medalist(s) |
| 2019 | International GymSport | | 9 | | | | |
| 2019 | Gym Festival Trnava | | 8 | 2nd place, silver medalist(s) | | | 2nd place, silver medalist(s) |
| 2019 | Junior World Championships | 16 | | | | | |
| 2019 | Hungarian Master Championships | | 8 | | | 2nd place, silver medalist(s) | 3rd place, bronze medalist(s) |
| 2019 | Olympic Hopes Cup | 3rd place, bronze medalist(s) | 14 | | | 3rd place, bronze medalist(s) | |

Competitive history of Nikolett Szilágyi at the senior level
| Year | Event | Team | AA | VT | UB | BB | FX |
|---|---|---|---|---|---|---|---|
| 2021 | Super Team Championships | 5 | 5 | | | | |
| 2021 | Hungarian Event Championships | | | | 5 | 2nd place, silver medalist(s) | 3rd place, bronze medalist(s) |
| 2021 | Gym Festival Trnava | | 1st place, gold medalist(s) | 1st place, gold medalist(s) | 3rd place, bronze medalist(s) | 3rd place, bronze medalist(s) | 1st place, gold medalist(s) |
| 2021 | Hungarian Championships | | 2nd place, silver medalist(s) | 6 | 5 | 1st place, gold medalist(s) | 2nd place, silver medalist(s) |
| 2022 | Baku World Cup | | | | | 8 | |
| 2022 | Paris Challenge Cup | | | | | 7 | |
| 2022 | World Championships | 14 | | | | | |
| 2023 | Hungarian Team Championships | | | 4 | 7 | 5 | 6 |
| 2023 | Elek Matolay Memorial | | 5 | | | | |
| 2023 | European Championships | 4 | | | | | |
| 2023 | Osijek World Challenge Cup | | | | | 8 | |
| 2023 | Mersin World Challenge Cup | | | | 6 | 3rd place, bronze medalist(s) | 4 |
| 2023 | Hungarian Championships | | 5 | 5 | 6 | 5 | 3rd place, bronze medalist(s) |
| 2023 | World Championships | 15 | | | | | |
| 2023 | Hungarian Masters Championships | | | | 3rd place, bronze medalist(s) | 2nd place, silver medalist(s) | |
| 2024 | Hungarian Championships | 7 | | | | | 4 |
| 2024 | Elek Matolay Memorial | | | | 4 | | |
| 2024 | European Championships | 10 | | | | | |
| 2024 | Hungarian Event Championships | | | | 3rd place, bronze medalist(s) | 6 | |
| 2025 | Hungarian Championships | 5 | 7 | | 6 | | |
| 2025 | Hungarian Team & Event Championships | 5 | 6 | | 8 | 4 | 4 |
| 2026 | Varna World Challenge Cup | | | | | 2nd place, silver medalist(s) | |
| 2026 | Koper World Challenge Cup | | | | | | 8 |
| 2026 | World Championships | | | | | 147 | 133 |
