= Zsuzsa Csisztu =

Hungarian artistic gymnast

- Full name: Zsuzsanna Csisztu
- Born: February 15, 1970 (age 56) Pilisborosjenő, Hungary

Gymnastics career
- Discipline: Women's artistic gymnastics
- Country represented: Hungary; (1982–92 (Hungary))
- College team: Minnesota Golden Gophers (1990–1992)

Zsuzsa Csisztu (born February 15, 1970) is a Hungarian former artistic gymnast. She competed at the 1988 Summer Olympics. In 1992 she started her cooperation with television and has worked as a TV presenter and actress since then.
