= 2023 European Artistic Gymnastics Championships =

10th European Men's and Women's Artistic Gymnastics Championships
- Venue: Antalya Sports Hall
- Location: Antalya, Turkey
- Start date: 11 April 2023
- End date: 16 April 2023
- Competitors: 319 from 39 nations

The 10th European Men's and Women's Artistic Gymnastics Championships was held from 11 to 16 April 2023 in Antalya, Turkey. This was the 45th European championships in total for men, and 35th in total for women (including the separate men's and women's championships held in even numbered years). The competition was a qualifying event for the 2023 World Championships. There were 39 nations represented by 319 athletes - 176 men and 143 women. Great Britain topped the medal table with four golds, four silvers and one bronze medal.

== Competition schedule ==
Date	Session	Time	Subdivisions
Tuesday, 11 April
Tuesday, 11 April	Men's Team Final and Qualification for Individual Finals	10:00 – 12:55	Subdivision 1
Tuesday, 11 April	Men's Team Final and Qualification for Individual Finals	14:00 – 16:55	Subdivision 2
Tuesday, 11 April	Men's Team Final and Qualification for Individual Finals	17:30 – 20:15	Subdivision 3
Wednesday, 12 April	Women's Team Final and Qualification for Individual Finals	10:00 – 12:00	Subdivision 1
Wednesday, 12 April	Women's Team Final and Qualification for Individual Finals	13:30 – 15:30	Subdivision 2
Wednesday, 12 April	Women's Team Final and Qualification for Individual Finals	16:00 – 18:00	Subdivision 3
Wednesday, 12 April	Women's Team Final and Qualification for Individual Finals	18:30 – 20:30	Subdivision 4
Thursday, 13 April	Men's Individual All-Around Final	16:00 – 18:45	Top 24 from qualifications
Friday, 14 April	Women's Individual All-Around Final	16:00 – 18:00	Top 24 from qualifications
Saturday, 15 April	Individual Apparatus Finals	13:30 – 16:10	MAG: Floor, Pommel horse, Rings
Saturday, 15 April	Individual Apparatus Finals	13:30 – 16:10	WAG: Vault, Uneven bars
Sunday, 16 April	Individual Apparatus Finals	13:00 – 15:40	MAG: Vault, Parallel bars, Horizontal bar
Sunday, 16 April	Individual Apparatus Finals	13:00 – 15:40	WAG: Balance beam, Floor
All times listed in local time (UTC+03:00).

== Medals summary ==
=== Medalists ===
Event	Gold	Silver	Bronze
Men
Team	Italy; Yumin Abbadini; Lorenzo Minh Casali; Matteo Levantesi; Marco Lodadio; Mario Macchiati	Turkey; Ferhat Arıcan; Adem Asil; Mehmet Koşak; Ahmet Önder; Kerem Şener	(United Kingdom) Great Britain; Jake Jarman; Joshua Nathan; Adam Tobin; Courtney Tulloch; Luke Whitehouse
All-around	(Turkey) Adem Asil	(United Kingdom) Jake Jarman	(Ukraine) Illia Kovtun
Floor	(United Kingdom) Luke Whitehouse	(Israel) Artem Dolgopyat	(Germany) Milan Hosseini
Pommel horse	(Republic of Ireland) Rhys McClenaghan	(Belgium) Maxime Gentges	(Armenia) Artur Davtyan
Rings	(Turkey) Adem Asil	(Armenia) Vahagn Davtyan	(Greece) Eleftherios Petrounias
Vault	(Armenia) Artur Davtyan	(United Kingdom) Jake Jarman	(Ukraine) Igor Radivilov
Parallel bars	(Ukraine) Illia Kovtun	(Turkey) Ferhat Arıcan	(Spain) Thierno Diallo
Horizontal bar	(Croatia) Tin Srbić	(Italy) Carlo Macchini	(Ukraine) Illia Kovtun
Women
Team	(United Kingdom) Great Britain; Ondine Achampong; Becky Downie; Georgia-Mae Fenton; Jessica Gadirova; Alice Kinsella	Italy; Angela Andreoli; Alice D'Amato; Asia D'Amato; Manila Esposito; Giorgia Villa	Netherlands; Eythora Thorsdottir; Vera van Pol; Sanna Veerman; Naomi Visser; Sanne Wevers
All-around	(United Kingdom) Jessica Gadirova	(Hungary) Zsófia Kovács	(Italy) Alice D'Amato
Vault	(France) Coline Devillard	(Italy) Asia D'Amato	(Belgium) Lisa Vaelen
Uneven bars	(Italy) Alice D'Amato	(United Kingdom) Becky Downie	(Germany) Elisabeth Seitz
Balance beam	(Netherlands) Sanne Wevers	(Italy) Manila Esposito	(Hungary) Zsófia Kovács
Floor	(United Kingdom) Jessica Gadirova	(United Kingdom) Alice Kinsella	(Romania) Sabrina Voinea

=== Medal standings ===
==== Overall ====
* Host nation (Turkey)

Rank	Nation	Gold	Silver	Bronze	Total
1	Great Britain (GBR)	4	4	1	9
2	Italy (ITA)	2	4	1	7
3	Turkey (TUR)*	2	2	0	4
4	Armenia (ARM)	1	1	1	3
5	Ukraine (UKR)	1	0	3	4
6	Netherlands (NED)	1	0	1	2
7	Croatia (CRO)	1	0	0	1
7	France (FRA)	1	0	0	1
7	Ireland (IRL)	1	0	0	1
10	Belgium (BEL)	0	1	1	2
10	Hungary (HUN)	0	1	1	2
12	Israel (ISR)	0	1	0	1
13	Germany (GER)	0	0	2	2
14	Greece (GRE)	0	0	1	1
14	Romania (ROU)	0	0	1	1
14	Spain (ESP)	0	0	1	1
Totals (16 entries)		14	14	14	42

==== Men ====
Rank	Nation	Gold	Silver	Bronze	Total
1	Turkey (TUR)*	2	2	0	4
2	Great Britain (GBR)	1	2	1	4
3	Armenia (ARM)	1	1	1	3
4	Italy (ITA)	1	1	0	2
5	Ukraine (UKR)	1	0	3	4
6	Croatia (CRO)	1	0	0	1
6	Ireland (IRL)	1	0	0	1
8	Belgium (BEL)	0	1	0	1
8	Israel (ISR)	0	1	0	1
10	Germany (GER)	0	0	1	1
10	Greece (GRE)	0	0	1	1
10	Spain (ESP)	0	0	1	1
Totals (12 entries)		8	8	8	24

==== Women ====
Rank	Nation	Gold	Silver	Bronze	Total
1	Great Britain (GBR)	3	2	0	5
2	Italy (ITA)	1	3	1	5
3	Netherlands (NED)	1	0	1	2
4	France (FRA)	1	0	0	1
5	Hungary (HUN)	0	1	1	2
6	Belgium (BEL)	0	0	1	1
6	Germany (GER)	0	0	1	1
6	Romania (ROU)	0	0	1	1
Totals (8 entries)		6	6	6	18

== Men's results ==
=== Team ===
Oldest and youngest competitors

	Name	Country	Date of birth	Age
Youngest	Daniel Carrion Caro	Spain	30 December 2004	18 years, 3 months and 12 days
Oldest	Andreas Toba	Germany	7 October 1990	32 years, 6 months and 4 days

28 nations took part in the men's team competition with no qualification round. The following were the top eight teams.

Rank	Team	Floor (gymnastics)	Pommel horse	Rings (gymnastics)	Vault (gymnastics)	Parallel bars	Horizontal bar	Total
1st place, gold medalist(s)	Italy	40.965	41.265	41.599	42.899	42.832	39.966	249.526
1st place, gold medalist(s)	Yumin Abbadini	13.966	14.266	13.500				249.526
1st place, gold medalist(s)	Lorenzo Minh Casali	13.633		13.466	14.466	14.133	13.400	249.526
1st place, gold medalist(s)	Matteo Levantesi		12.866			14.733	13.400	249.526
1st place, gold medalist(s)	Marco Lodadio			14.633	14.233			249.526
1st place, gold medalist(s)	Mario Macchiati	13.366	14.133		14.200	13.966	13.166	249.526
2nd place, silver medalist(s)	Turkey	40.832	39.233	42.666	43.199	42.633	39.699	248.262
2nd place, silver medalist(s)	Adem Asil	13.766	12.700	15.033	14.966	14.000	13.200	248.262
2nd place, silver medalist(s)	Ferhat Arıcan		13.800		14.033	15.100		248.262
2nd place, silver medalist(s)	Ahmet Önder	13.600			14.200		13.266	248.262
2nd place, silver medalist(s)	Mehmet Koşak	13.466	12.733	14.200				248.262
2nd place, silver medalist(s)	Kerem Şener			13.433		13.533	13.233	248.262
3rd place, bronze medalist(s)	Great Britain	41.699	40.132	41.166	43.332	40.866	39.766	246.961
3rd place, bronze medalist(s)	Jake Jarman	13.833	13.633	13.233	14.766	14.400	13.233	246.961
3rd place, bronze medalist(s)	Courtney Tulloch			14.733		13.333		246.961
3rd place, bronze medalist(s)	Luke Whitehouse	14.100	12.966					246.961
3rd place, bronze medalist(s)	Adam Tobin			13.200	14.466		13.200	246.961
3rd place, bronze medalist(s)	Joshua Nathan	13.766	13.533		14.100	13.133	13.333	246.961
4	Switzerland	42.033	40.132	40.099	41.699	43.400	38.966	246.329
4	Noe Seifert	14.300	12.966		13.933	14.700	12.600	246.329
4	Florian Langenegger	13.700	13.466	13.266	14.033		13.000	246.329
4	Eddy Yusof		13.700	13.833		14.400		246.329
4	Taha Serhani				13.733	14.300		246.329
4	Moreno Kratter	14.033		13.000			13.366	246.329
5	Germany	40.033	40.466	40.232	42.432	42.200	39.166	244.529
5	Nils Dunkel	13.000	13.600	13.333		14.000	12.800	244.529
5	Andreas Toba		13.200	13.633	14.000		13.166	244.529
5	Nick Klessing			13.266	14.266			244.529
5	Lucas Kochan	13.433			14.166	14.000		244.529
5	Pascal Brendel	13.600	13.666			14.200	13.200	244.529
6	Spain	40.065	39.433	41.232	42.100	41.400	39.399	243.629
6	Néstor Abad		13.233	13.766	13.700	13.900	13.733	243.629
6	Thierno Diallo	13.566	13.200		13.800	14.700	13.000	243.629
6	Daniel Carrion Caro	13.666						243.629
6	Adrià Vera		13.000	13.333		12.800	12.666	243.629
6	Rayderley Zapata	12.833		14.133	14.600			243.629
7	France	41.299	36.833	40.532	42.333	42.700	39.632	243.329
7	Jim Zona	13.433	13.133	13.200	13.900		13.133	243.329
7	Léo Saladino		11.400		14.433	14.100		243.329
7	Mathias Philippe	13.766		13.866		14.200	13.366	243.329
7	Lucas Desanges	14.100	12.300		14.000		13.133	243.329
7	Cameron-Lie Bernard			13.466		14.400		243.329
8	Belgium	40.133	40.232	39.466	42.732	41.399	39.166	243.128
8	Noah Kuavita				14.433	13.800		243.128
8	Luka Van den Keybus	13.633		13.000		13.633	12.800	243.128
8	Maxime Gentges	13.000	14.166			13.966	13.500	243.128
8	Víctor Martínez		12.866	13.300	14.466		12.866	243.128
8	Takumi Onoshima	13.500	13.200	13.166	13.833			243.128

=== Individual all-around ===
Oldest and youngest competitors

	Name	Country	Date of birth	Age
Youngest	Botond Molnár	Hungary	3 September 2004	18 years, 7 months and 10 days
Oldest	Artur Davtyan	Armenia	8 August 1992	30 years, 8 months and 5 days

Rank	Gymnast	Floor (gymnastics)	Pommel horse	Rings (gymnastics)	Vault (gymnastics)	Parallel bars	Horizontal bar	Total
1st place, gold medalist(s)	(Turkey) Adem Asil	13.933	13.166	15.033	15.100	14.300	13.433	84.965
2nd place, silver medalist(s)	(United Kingdom) Jake Jarman	14.366	13.166	13.133	15.266	14.266	13.266	83.463
3rd place, bronze medalist(s)	(Ukraine) Illia Kovtun	13.900	12.966	13.500	13.200	15.433	14.033	83.032
4	(Armenia) Artur Davtyan	13.000	13.933	13.966	15.100	13.666	13.000	82.665
5	(Switzerland) Noe Seifert	13.666	13.333	13.366	14.033	14.333	13.933	82.664
6	(Italy) Yumin Abbadini	13.766	14.100	13.266	13.566	14.000	13.466	82.164
7	(Switzerland) Florian Langenegger	14.100	13.833	13.033	14.400	13.566	12.933	81.865
8	(Germany) Pascal Brendel	13.500	13.966	12.866	13.933	13.666	13.233	81.164
9	(Italy) Lorenzo Minh Casali	13.800	12.800	13.500	14.100	14.066	12.866	81.132
10	(Spain) Thierno Diallo	13.200	13.200	12.833	13.600	14.033	13.033	79.899
11	(Finland) Elias Koski	13.400	13.966	13.166	13.800	12.533	12.933	79.798
12	(Belgium) Víctor Martínez	13.666	13.033	12.466	14.333	13.233	13.000	79.731
13	(Spain) Néstor Abad	12.633	13.000	13.666	13.000	13.833	13.400	79.532
14	(Hungary) Botond Molnár	13.333	12.333	12.833	14.466	13.366	13.133	79.464
15	(Netherlands) Casimir Schmidt	13.133	12.200	13.900	13.100	13.733	13.366	79.432
16	(France) Léo Saladino	13.866	12.333	13.466	14.633	13.966	11.133	79.397
17	(Hungary) Krisztofer Mészáros	13.900	12.666	13.233	14.100	14.266	11.133	79.298
18	(Belgium) Luka Van den Keybus	13.900	11.500	12.400	14.400	13.466	13.433	79.099
19	(United Kingdom) Joshua Nathan	13.800	11.400	12.933	13.800	13.700	13.400	79.033
20	(Finland) Oskar Kirmes	13.300	13.200	13.200	12.533	13.200	13.166	78.599
21	(Turkey) Ahmet Önder	13.766	11.233	12.100	14.100	13.300	13.766	78.265
22	(Israel) Ilia Liubimov	13.033	11.800	11.833	13.900	13.600	13.433	77.599
23	(Romania) Gabriel Burtănete	13.233	12.733	13.500	11.966	13.266	11.666	76.364
24	(Norway) Sofus Heggemsnes	13.266	11.800	13.100	13.100	12.900	11.366	75.532

- (Israel) Artem Dolgopyat withdrew and was replaced by first reserve (Norway) Sofus Heggemsnes.
- (Lithuania) Robert Tvorogal withdrew and was replaced by second reserve (Israel) Ilia Liubimov.

=== Floor exercise ===
Oldest and youngest competitors

	Name	Country	Date of birth	Age
Youngest	Harry Hepworth	Great Britain	7 December 2003	19 years, 4 months and 8 days
Oldest	Artem Dolgopyat	Israel	16 June 1997	25 years, 9 months and 30 days

Rank	Gymnast	D Score	E Score	Pen.	Total
1st place, gold medalist(s)	(United Kingdom) Luke Whitehouse	6.5	8.400		14.900
2nd place, silver medalist(s)	(Israel) Artem Dolgopyat	6.1	8.566		14.666
3rd place, bronze medalist(s)	(Germany) Milan Hosseini	5.9	8.300		14.200
4	(United Kingdom) Harry Hepworth	6.4	7.800		14.200
5	(France) Benjamin Osberger	5.5	8.300		13.800
6	(Ukraine) Illia Kovtun	5.9	7.833		13.733
7	(France) Lucas Desanges	5.7	7.766	0.100	13.366
8	(Switzerland) Noe Seifert	5.7	7.100		12.800

=== Pommel horse ===
Oldest and youngest competitors

	Name	Country	Date of birth	Age
Youngest	Illia Kovtun	Ukraine	10 August 2003	19 years, 4 months and 7 days
Oldest	Matvei Petrov	Albania	16 July 1990	32 years, 8 months and 30 days

Rank	Gymnast	D Score	E Score	Pen.	Total
1st place, gold medalist(s)	(Republic of Ireland) Rhys McClenaghan	6.4	8.266		14.666
2nd place, silver medalist(s)	(Belgium) Maxime Gentges	6.2	8.366		14.566
3rd place, bronze medalist(s)	(Armenia) Artur Davtyan	5.7	8.566		14.266
4	(Netherlands) Loran de Munck	6.5	7.766		14.266
5	(Ukraine) Illia Kovtun	6.0	8.233		14.233
6	(Italy) Yumin Abbadini	5.7	8.466		14.166
7	(Czech Republic) Radomír Sliž	5.6	8.000		13.600
8	(Albania) Matvei Petrov	5.8	7.466		13.266

=== Rings ===
Oldest and youngest competitors

	Name	Country	Date of birth	Age
Youngest	Sokratis Pilakouris	Cyprus	16 April 1999	23 years, 11 months and 30 days
Oldest	Vahagn Davtyan	Armenia	19 August 1988	34 years, 7 months and 27 days

Rank	Gymnast	D Score	E Score	Pen.	Total
1st place, gold medalist(s)	(Turkey) Adem Asil	6.3	8.633		14.933
2nd place, silver medalist(s)	(Armenia) Vahagn Davtyan	6.0	8.733		14.733
3rd place, bronze medalist(s)	(Greece) Eleftherios Petrounias	6.3	8.433		14.733
4	(Italy) Marco Lodadio	6.3	8.366		14.666
5	(Azerbaijan) Nikita Simonov	6.2	8.366		14.566
6	(United Kingdom) Courtney Tulloch	6.2	8.266		14.466
7	(Armenia) Artur Avetisyan	6.0	8.433		14.433
8	(Cyprus) Sokratis Pilakouris	6.0	8.233		14.233

=== Vault ===
Oldest and youngest competitors

	Name	Country	Date of birth	Age
Youngest	Harry Hepworth	Great Britain	7 December 2003	19 years, 4 months and 9 days
Oldest	Artur Davtyan	Armenia	8 August 1992	30 years, 8 months and 8 days

Rank	Gymnast	Vault 1				Vault 2				Total
Rank	Gymnast	D Score	E Score	Pen.	Score 1	D Score	E Score	Pen.	Score 2	Total
1st place, gold medalist(s)	(Armenia) Artur Davtyan	5.6	9.300		14.900	5.6	9.566		15.166	15.033
2nd place, silver medalist(s)	(United Kingdom) Jake Jarman	6.0	9.300	0.100	15.200	5.6	9.233		14.833	15.016
3rd place, bronze medalist(s)	(Ukraine) Igor Radivilov	5.6	9.300		14.900	5.6	9.100	0.100	14.600	14.750
4	(Romania) Gabriel Burtanete	5.6	8.733		14.333	5.6	8.966		14.566	14.449
5	(Turkey) Adem Asil	6.0	9.166		15.166	5.6	8.033	0.100	13.533	14.349
6	(Switzerland) Luca Giubellini	5.6	8.900		14.500	5.2	8.800	0.100	13.900	14.200
7	(United Kingdom) Harry Hepworth	5.6	9.166		14.766	5.6	7.933	0.300	13.233	13.999
8	(Poland) Sebastian Gawronski	5.2	8.800	0.100	13.900	5.6	7.866	0.100	13.366	13.633

=== Parallel bars ===
Oldest and youngest competitors

	Name	Country	Date of birth	Age
Youngest	Illia Kovtun	Ukraine	10 August 2003	19 years, 8 months and 6 days
Oldest	Andrei Muntean	Romania	30 January 1993	30 years, 2 months and 17 days

Rank	Gymnast	D Score	E Score	Pen.	Total
1st place, gold medalist(s)	(Ukraine) Illia Kovtun	6.6	8.566		15.166
2nd place, silver medalist(s)	(Turkey) Ferhat Arıcan	6.5	8.433		14.933
3rd place, bronze medalist(s)	(Spain) Thierno Diallo	6.4	8.333		14.733
4	(Romania) Andrei Muntean	5.9	8.500		14.400
5	(France) Cameron-Lie Bernard	6.2	8.166		14.366
6	(Switzerland) Eddy Yusof	5.9	7.566		13.466
7	(Switzerland) Noe Seifert	6.3	7.066		13.366
8	(Italy) Matteo Levantesi	5.6	7.533		13.133
9	(United Kingdom) Jake Jarman	5.6	7.466		13.066

=== Horizontal bar ===
Oldest and youngest competitors

	Name	Country	Date of birth	Age
Youngest	Illia Kovtun	Ukraine	10 August 2003	19 years, 8 months and 6 days
Oldest	Néstor Abad	Spain	29 March 1993	30 years and 18 days

Rank	Gymnast	D Score	E Score	Pen.	Total
1st place, gold medalist(s)	(Croatia) Tin Srbić	5.9	8.333		14.233
2nd place, silver medalist(s)	(Italy) Carlo Macchini	6.3	7.900		14.200
3rd place, bronze medalist(s)	(Ukraine) Illia Kovtun	5.7	8.266		13.966
4	(Spain) Néstor Abad	5.3	8.366		13.666
5	(Hungary) Krisztofer Mészáros	5.6	8.066		13.666
6	(Lithuania) Robert Tvorogal	5.8	7.300		13.100
7	(Norway) Sofus Heggemsnes	5.5	7.433		12.933
8	(Hungary) Krisztián Balázs	5.1	7.400		12.500

== Women's results ==
=== Team ===
Oldest and youngest competitors

	Name	Country	Date of birth	Age
Youngest	Sabrina Voinea	Romania	4 June 2007	15 years, 10 months and 8 days
Oldest	Sanne Wevers	Netherlands	17 September 1991	31 years, 6 months and 26 days

27 nations took part in the women's team competition with no qualification round. The following were the top eight teams.

Rank	Team	Vault (gymnastics)	Uneven bars	Balance beam	Floor (gymnastics)	Total
1st place, gold medalist(s)	Great Britain	41.999	42.198	39.732	40.532	164.428
1st place, gold medalist(s)	Ondine Achampong	13.966		13.366	13.166	164.428
1st place, gold medalist(s)	Becky Downie		14.366			164.428
1st place, gold medalist(s)	Georgia-Mae Fenton		13.966			164.428
1st place, gold medalist(s)	Jessica Gadirova	14.200	13.866	13.600	13.900	164.428
1st place, gold medalist(s)	Alice Kinsella	13.833		12.766	13.466	164.428
2nd place, silver medalist(s)	Italy	41.499	42.832	38.366	38.932	161.629
2nd place, silver medalist(s)	Angela Andreoli				13.000	161.629
2nd place, silver medalist(s)	Alice D'Amato	14.000	14.500	13.033	13.366	161.629
2nd place, silver medalist(s)	Asia D'Amato	13.933	14.166	12.500		161.629
2nd place, silver medalist(s)	Manila Esposito	13.566		12.833	12.566	161.629
2nd place, silver medalist(s)	Giorgia Villa		14.166			161.629
3rd place, bronze medalist(s)	Netherlands	40.599	41.099	38.199	38.999	158.896
3rd place, bronze medalist(s)	Eythora Thorsdottir	13.866	13.533	12.000	12.600	158.896
3rd place, bronze medalist(s)	Vera van Pol	13.600			12.733	158.896
3rd place, bronze medalist(s)	Sanna Veerman		13.100			158.896
3rd place, bronze medalist(s)	Naomi Visser	13.133	14.466	12.766	13.666	158.896
3rd place, bronze medalist(s)	Sanne Wevers			13.433		158.896
4	Hungary	40.232	40.898	37.865	37.632	156.627
4	Bettina Lili Czifra		12.566		12.133	156.627
4	Zsófia Kovács	14.166	14.266	13.533	13.266	156.627
4	Gréta Mayer	13.200		12.566		156.627
4	Zója Székely	12.866	14.066	11.766	12.233	156.627
4	Nikolett Szilágyi					156.627
5	Romania	39.899	39.032	38.033	39.333	156.297
5	Ana Bărbosu		13.600	12.800	13.233	156.297
5	Lilia Cosman	13.166	12.666			156.297
5	Amalia Ghigoarță	13.133	12.766	13.133	12.400	156.297
5	Andreea Preda			12.100		156.297
5	Sabrina Voinea	13.600			13.700	156.297
6	France	41.099	38.466	37.499	38.232	155.296
6	Marine Boyer	13.333	12.500	12.366	12.733	155.296
6	Coline Devillard	14.366		12.333		155.296
6	Djenna Laroui		13.200		12.866	155.296
6	Silane Mielle		12.766			155.296
6	Morgane Osyssek	13.400		12.800	12.633	155.296
7	Belgium	40.632	40.933	35.432	37.999	154.996
7	Maellyse Brassart	13.333		11.133		154.996
7	Fien Enghels		13.933	12.833		154.996
7	Aberdeen O'Driscoll	13.133			12.833	154.996
7	Lisa Vaelen	14.166	14.000	11.466	12.866	154.996
7	Jutta Verkest		13.000		12.300	154.996
8	Spain	39.399	39.633	36.066	37.999	153.097
8	Laura Casabuena	13.166	13.133	11.800	13.100	153.097
8	Laia Font	13.200		11.533		153.097
8	Maia Llacer					153.097
8	Ana Pérez		13.400	12.733	12.166	153.097
8	Alba Petisco	13.033	13.100		12.733	153.097

=== Individual all-around ===
Oldest and youngest competitors

	Name	Country	Date of birth	Age
Youngest	Alice Vlkova	Czech Republic	30 December 2007	15 years, 3 months and 15 days
Oldest	Eythora Thorsdottir	Netherlands	10 August 1998	24 years, 8 months and 4 days

Rank	Gymnast	Vault (gymnastics)	Uneven bars	Balance beam	Floor (gymnastics)	Total
1st place, gold medalist(s)	(United Kingdom) Jessica Gadirova	14.100	13.466	13.533	13.933	55.032
2nd place, silver medalist(s)	(Hungary) Zsófia Kovács	14.100	13.700	13.833	13.266	54.899
3rd place, bronze medalist(s)	(Italy) Alice D'Amato	14.000	14.400	13.000	13.100	54.500
4	(Belgium) Lisa Vaelen	14.333	13.700	12.933	13.133	54.099
5	(Belgium) Maellyse Brassart	13.333	13.666	13.400	12.466	52.865
6	(Netherlands) Eythora Thorsdottir	13.933	13.200	12.900	12.700	52.733
7	(Netherlands) Naomi Visser	13.266	14.033	12.100	13.200	52.599
8	(United Kingdom) Georgia-Mae Fenton	12.066	13.800	13.100	12.633	51.599
9	(Romania) Ana Bărbosu	13.400	13.133	12.933	12.033	51.499
10	(Spain) Laura Casabuena	13.233	12.900	12.300	12.700	51.133
11	(Spain) Alba Petisco	13.166	12.933	12.500	12.500	51.099
12	(Italy) Manila Esposito	13.600	12.500	13.033	11.800	50.933
13	(France) Morgane Osyssek-Reimer	13.200	12.800	12.633	12.300	50.933
14	(Sweden) Tonya Paulsson	13.266	12.933	12.433	12.166	50.798
15	(Finland) Maisa Kuusikko	13.100	13.266	12.100	12.300	50.766
16	(Germany) Sarah Voss	13.500	12.000	11.966	12.466	49.932
17	(Hungary) Zója Székely	13.000	13.433	10.666	12.233	49.332
18	(Austria) Selina Kickinger	13.166	12.366	12.066	11.633	49.231
19	(Romania) Amalia Ghigoarță	13.000	9.266	12.900	12.733	47.899
20	(Sweden) Emelie Westlund	12.766	12.733	10.233	11.966	47.698
21	(Austria) Bianca Frysak	12.633	12.033	10.600	11.866	47.132
22	(Norway) Maria Tronrud	12.733	12.100	12.566	9.666	47.065
23	(Finland) Kaia Tanskanen	13.200	10.500	10.766	12.500	46.966
24	(Czech Republic) Alice Vlkova	13.100	11.566	9.433	12.233	46.332

- (France) Marine Boyer withdrew and was replaced by second reserve (Austria) Bianca Frysak.

=== Vault ===
Oldest and youngest competitors

	Name	Country	Date of birth	Age
Youngest	Athanasia Mesiri	Greece	13 November 2007	15 years, 5 months and 2 days
Oldest	Coline Devillard	France	9 October 2000	22 years, 6 months and 6 days

Rank	Gymnast	Vault 1				Vault 2				Total
Rank	Gymnast	D Score	E Score	Pen.	Score 1	D Score	E Score	Pen.	Score 2	Total
1st place, gold medalist(s)	(France) Coline Devillard	5.4	8.900		14.300	4.2	9.100		13.300	13.800
2nd place, silver medalist(s)	(Italy) Asia D'Amato	5.0	9.000		14.000	4.8	8.700	0.300	13.200	13.600
3rd place, bronze medalist(s)	(Belgium) Lisa Vaelen	5.4	8.733	0.100	14.033	4.4	8.733		13.133	13.583
4	(Romania) Sabrina Voinea	5.0	8.800		13.800	3.8	8.666	0.100	12.366	13.083
5	(Turkey) Bilge Tarhan	4.2	8.800		13.000	4.0	8.633		12.633	12.816
6	(Turkey) Ceren Biner	4.2	8.866		13.066	3.8	8.666		12.466	12.766
7	(Greece) Athanasia Mesiri	4.2	8.600		12.800	4.0	8.700		12.700	12.750
8	(Denmark) Camille Rasmussen	3.0	8.533		11.533	4.4	8.566		12.966	12.249

=== Uneven bars ===
Oldest and youngest competitors

	Name	Country	Date of birth	Age
Youngest	Lisa Vaelen	Belgium	10 August 2004	18 years, 8 months and 5 days
Oldest	Becky Downie	Great Britain	24 January 1992	31 years, 2 months and 22 days

Rank	Gymnast	D Score	E Score	Pen.	Total
1st place, gold medalist(s)	(Italy) Alice D'Amato	6.2	8.266		14.466
2nd place, silver medalist(s)	(United Kingdom) Becky Downie	6.3	7.933		14.233
3rd place, bronze medalist(s)	(Germany) Elisabeth Seitz	6.1	8.100		14.200
4	(Italy) Giorgia Villa	5.8	8.266		14.066
5	(Hungary) Zsófia Kovács	6.2	7.733		13.933
6	(Hungary) Zója Székely	5.9	7.933		13.833
7	(Belgium) Lisa Vaelen	5.8	7.933		13.733
8	(Netherlands) Naomi Visser	5.7	6.100		11.800

=== Balance beam ===
Oldest and youngest competitors

	Name	Country	Date of birth	Age
Youngest	Amalia Ghigoarță	Romania	28 January 2007	16 years, 2 months and 19 days
Oldest	Sanne Wevers	Netherlands	17 September 1991	31 years, 6 months and 30 days

Rank	Gymnast	D Score	E Score	Pen.	Total
1st place, gold medalist(s)	(Netherlands) Sanne Wevers	5.8	8.000		13.800
2nd place, silver medalist(s)	(Italy) Manila Esposito	5.7	8.000		13.700
3rd place, bronze medalist(s)	(Hungary) Zsófia Kovács	5.9	7.800		13.700
4	(United Kingdom) Ondine Achampong	5.9	7.633		13.533
5	(Italy) Alice D'Amato	5.5	7.800		13.300
6	(Romania) Amalia Ghigoarță	5.0	7.900		12.900
7	(United Kingdom) Jessica Gadirova	5.4	6.766		12.166
8	(Belgium) Fien Enghels	5.0	6.733		11.433

=== Floor exercise ===
Oldest and youngest competitors

	Name	Country	Date of birth	Age
Youngest	Sabrina Voinea	Romania	4 June 2007	15 years, 10 months and 12 days
Oldest	Zsófia Kovács	Hungary	6 April 2000	23 years and 10 days

Rank	Gymnast	D Score	E Score	Pen.	Total
1st place, gold medalist(s)	(United Kingdom) Jessica Gadirova	5.8	8.200		14.000
2nd place, silver medalist(s)	(United Kingdom) Alice Kinsella	5.6	8.066		13.666
3rd place, bronze medalist(s)	(Romania) Sabrina Voinea	5.9	7.666		13.566
4	(Netherlands) Naomi Visser	5.8	7.666		13.466
5	(Italy) Alice D'Amato	5.4	8.033		13.433
6	(Spain) Laura Casabuena	5.2	7.833		13.033
7	(Romania) Ana Bărbosu	5.5	7.300		12.800
8	(Hungary) Zsófia Kovács	5.7	7.333		12.733

== Qualification ==
=== Men's results ===
==== Individual all-around ====
Rank	Gymnast	Floor (gymnastics)	Pommel horse	Rings (gymnastics)	Vault (gymnastics)	Parallel bars	Horizontal bar	Total	Qual.
1	(Ukraine) Illia Kovtun	14.066	14.400	13.733	14.333	14.900	14.000	85.432	Q
2	(Turkey) Adem Asil	13.766	12.700	15.033	14.966	14.000	13.200	83.665	Q
3	(United Kingdom) Jake Jarman	13.833	13.633	13.233	14.766	14.400	13.233	83.098	Q
4	(Armenia) Artur Davtyan	13.400	14.266	13.733	15.000	13.600	12.466	82.465	Q
5	(Netherlands) Casimir Schmidt	13.400	13.200	14.066	14.266	13.800	13.200	81.932	Q
6	(Germany) Pascal Brendel	13.600	13.666	13.100	13.966	14.200	13.200	81.732	Q
7	(Hungary) Krisztofer Mészáros	13.733	12.900	13.333	14.200	13.833	13.700	81.699	Q
8	(Spain) Thierno Diallo	13.566	13.200	12.900	13.800	14.700	13.000	81.166	Q
9	(Italy) Yumin Abbadini	13.966	14.266	13.500	13.733	13.500	12.133	81.098	Q
10	(United Kingdom) Joshua Nathan	13.766	13.533	13.166	14.100	13.133	13.333	81.031	Q
11	(Italy) Lorenzo Minh Casali	13.633	11.900	13.466	14.466	14.133	13.400	80.998	Q
12	(Finland) Elias Koski	13.566	13.500	13.433	13.833	13.533	13.000	80.865	Q
13	(Switzerland) Noe Seifert	14.300	12.966	12.333	13.933	14.700	12.600	80.832	Q
14	(Spain) Néstor Abad	12.500	13.233	13.766	13.700	13.900	13.733	80.832	Q
15	(Switzerland) Florian Langenegger	13.700	13.466	13.266	14.033	13.333	13.000	80.798	Q
16	(Israel) Artem Dolgopyat	14.366	13.066	13.166	13.766	13.333	12.833	80.530	Q
17	(Romania) Gabriel Burtănete	13.366	12.833	13.666	14.600	13.933	12.100	80.498	Q
18	(United Kingdom) Adam Tobin	13.500	12.900	13.200	14.466	12.933	13.200	80.199	–
19	(Hungary) Botond Molnár	13.766	12.566	13.066	14.300	13.466	12.900	80.064	Q
20	(Lithuania) Robert Tvorogal	12.966	13.100	13.133	13.833	13.000	13.700	79.732	Q
21	(Belgium) Víctor Martínez	12.466	12.866	13.300	14.466	13.566	12.866	79.530	Q
22	(Finland) Oskar Kirmes	13.300	13.133	13.233	13.466	13.300	12.900	79.332	Q
23	(Turkey) Ahmet Önder	13.600	12.466	12.700	14.200	12.966	13.266	79.198	Q
24	(France) Léo Saladino	13.366	11.400	12.933	14.433	14.100	12.866	79.098	Q
25	(Belgium) Luka Van den Keybus	13.633	12.366	13.000	13.200	13.633	12.800	78.632	Q
26	(Norway) Sofus Heggemsnes	13.166	10.833	13.033	14.500	13.566	13.500	78.598	R1
27	(Hungary) Krisztián Balázs	12.566	12.633	13.200	13.033	13.200	13.866	78.498	–
28	(Israel) Ilia Liubimov	12.233	13.333	13.066	13.800	12.600	13.233	78.265	R2
29	(Greece) Nikolaos Iliopoulos	12.266	12.333	13.400	13.966	13.266	12.900	78.131	R3

==== Floor exercise ====
Rank	Gymnast	D Score	E Score	Pen.	Total	Qual.
1	(United Kingdom) Harry Hepworth	6.3	8.300		14.600	Q
2	(Israel) Artem Dolgopyat	6.1	8.266		14.366	Q
3	(Switzerland) Noe Seifert	5.7	8.600		14.300	Q
4	(Germany) Milan Hosseini	6.0	8.266		14.266	Q
5	(France) Benjamin Osberger	5.6	8.533		14.133	Q
6	(France) Lucas Desanges	5.7	8.400		14.100	Q
7	(United Kingdom) Luke Whitehouse	6.5	7.700	0.100	14.100	Q
8	(Ukraine) Illia Kovtun	6.1	7.966		14.066	Q
9	(Switzerland) Moreno Kratter	5.8	8.233		14.033	R1
10	(Cyprus) Neofytos Kyriakou	5.3	8.700		14.000	R2
11	(Italy) Yumin Abbadini	5.5	8.466		13.966	R3

==== Pommel horse ====
Rank	Gymnast	D Score	E Score	Pen.	Total	Qual.
1	(Republic of Ireland) Rhys McClenaghan	6.4	8.566		14.966	Q
2	(Netherlands) Loran de Munck	6.5	8.166		14.666	Q
3	(Albania) Matvei Petrov	6.2	8.300		14.500	Q
4	(Ukraine) Illia Kovtun	6.0	8.400		14.400	Q
5	(Czech Republic) Radomir Sliz	5.9	8.466		14.366	Q
6	(Italy) Yumin Abbadini	5.7	8.566		14.266	Q
6	(Armenia) Artur Davtyan	5.7	8.566		14.266	Q
8	(Belgium) Maxime Gentges	6.2	7.966		14.166	Q
9	(Italy) Mario Macchiati	5.5	8.633		14.133	R1
10	(France) Benjamin Osberger	5.6	8.366		13.966	R2
11	(Switzerland) Luca Giubellini	5.9	7.966		13.866	R3

==== Rings ====
Rank	Gymnast	D Score	E Score	Pen.	Total	Qual.
1	(Turkey) Adem Asil	6.3	8.733		15.033	Q
2	(Armenia) Vahagn Davtyan	6.0	8.800		14.800	Q
3	(United Kingdom) Courtney Tulloch	6.2	8.533		14.733	Q
4	(Greece) Eleftherios Petrounias	6.3	8.433		14.733	Q
5	(Armenia) Artur Avetisyan	5.9	8.766		14.666	Q
6	(Azerbaijan) Nikita Simonov	6.2	8.466		14.666	Q
7	(Italy) Marco Lodadio	6.3	8.333		14.633	Q
8	(Cyprus) Sokratis Pilakouris	5.9	8.566		14.466	Q
9	(Ukraine) Igor Radivilov	6.0	8.300		14.300	R1
10	(Turkey) Mehmet Kosak	6.0	8.200		14.200	R2
11	(Spain) Rayderley Zapata	5.5	8.633		14.133	R3

==== Vault ====
Rank	Gymnast	Vault 1				Vault 2				Total	Qual.
Rank	Gymnast	D Score	E Score	Pen.	Score 1	D Score	E Score	Pen.	Score 2	Total	Qual.
1	(Armenia) Artur Davtyan	5.6	9.400		15.000	5.6	9.533		15.133	15.066	Q
2	(United Kingdom) Jake Jarman	6.0	8.766		14.766	5.6	9.400		15.000	14.883	Q
3	(United Kingdom) Harry Hepworth	5.6	9.400		15.000	5.6	9.100		14.700	14.850	Q
4	(Romania) Gabriel Burtanete	5.6	9.100		14.600	5.6	9.200		14.800	14.700	Q
5	(Ukraine) Igor Radivilov	5.6	8.933		14.533	5.6	9.200		14.800	14.666	Q
6	(Poland) Sebastian Gawroński	5.2	9.200		14.400	5.6	8.966		14.566	14.483	Q
7	(Turkey) Adem Asil	6.0	9.066	0.100	14.966	4.8	9.100		13.900	14.433	Q
8	(Switzerland) Luca Giubellini	5.6	9.000	0.100	14.500	5.2	9.033		14.233	14.433	Q
9	(Czech Republic) Ondrej Kalný	5.2	9.233		14.433	5.2	9.100		14.300	14.366	R1
10	(France) Leo Saladino	5.6	8.933	0.100	14.433	5.2	9.000		14.200	14.316	R2
11	(Spain) Rayderley Zapata	5.6	9.000		14.600	4.8	8.933		13.733	14.166	R3

==== Parallel bars ====
Rank	Gymnast	D Score	E Score	Pen.	Total	Qual.
1	(Turkey) Ferhat Arıcan	6.5	8.600		15.100	Q
2	(Ukraine) Illia Kovtun	6.3	8.600		14.900	Q
3	(Italy) Matteo Levantesi	6.2	8.533		14.733	Q
4	(Switzerland) Noe Seifert	6.3	8.400		14.700	Q
5	(Spain) Thierno Diallo	6.4	8.300		14.700	Q
6	(Romania) Andrei Muntean	5.9	8.733		14.633	Q
7	(France) Cameron-Lie Bernard	5.8	8.600		14.400	Q
8	(United Kingdom) Jake Jarman	5.9	8.500		14.400	Q
8	(Switzerland) Eddy Yusof	5.9	8.500		14.400	Q
10	(Switzerland) Taha Serhani	5.6	8.700		14.300	–
11	(Norway) Harald Wibye	5.4	8.866		14.266	R1
12	(Germany) Pascal Brendel	5.7	8.500		14.200	R2
13	(France) Mathias Philippe	6.1	8.100		14.200	R3

==== Horizontal bar ====
Rank	Gymnast	D Score	E Score	Pen.	Total	Qual.
1	(Italy) Carlo Macchini	6.1	8.133		14.233	Q
2	(Ukraine) Illia Kovtun	5.7	8.300		14.000	Q
3	(Croatia) Tin Srbić	5.5	8.466		13.966	Q
4	(Hungary) Krisztián Balázs	5.5	8.366		13.866	Q
5	(Spain) Néstor Abad	5.3	8.433		13.733	Q
6	(Lithuania) Robert Tvorogal	5.5	8.200		13.700	Q
7	(Hungary) Krisztofer Mészáros	5.6	8.100		13.700	Q
8	(Norway) Sofus Heggemsnes	5.3	8.200		13.500	Q
9	(Belgium) Maxime Gentges	5.5	8.000		13.500	R1
10	(Hungary) Dávid Vecsernyés	5.8	7.700		13.500	–
11	(Italy) Lorenzo Minh Casali	5.3	8.100		13.400	R2
12	(Italy) Matteo Levantesi	5.4	8.000		13.400	–
13	(France) Mathias Philippe	5.6	7.766		13.366	R3

=== Women's results ===
==== Individual all-around ====
Rank	Gymnast	Vault (gymnastics)	Uneven bars	Balance beam	Floor (gymnastics)	Total	Qual.
1	(United Kingdom) Jessica Gadirova	14.200	13.866	13.600	13.900	55.566	Q
2	(Hungary) Zsófia Kovács	14.166	14.266	13.533	13.266	55.231	Q
3	(Italy) Alice D'Amato	14.000	14.500	13.033	13.366	54.899	Q
4	(Netherlands) Naomi Visser	13.133	14.466	12.766	13.666	54.031	Q
5	(United Kingdom) Georgia-Mae Fenton	13.733	13.933	12.333	12.900	52.899	Q
6	(United Kingdom) Alice Kinsella	13.833	12.466	12.766	13.466	52.531	–
7	(Belgium) Lisa Vaelen	14.166	14.000	11.466	12.866	52.498	Q
8	(Netherlands) Eythora Thorsdottir	13.866	13.533	12.000	12.600	51.999	Q
9	(Romania) Ana Bărbosu	11.933	13.600	12.800	13.233	51.566	Q
10	(Romania) Amalia Ghigoarță	13.133	12.766	13.133	12.400	51.432	Q
11	(Italy) Manila Esposito	13.566	12.266	12.833	12.566	51.231	Q
12	(Spain) Laura Casabuena	13.166	13.133	11.800	13.100	51.199	Q
13	(France) Marine Boyer	13.333	12.500	12.366	12.733	50.932	Q
14	(Hungary) Zoja Szekely	12.866	14.066	11.766	12.233	50.931	Q
15	(Finland) Kaia Tanskanen	13.033	12.800	12.100	12.700	50.633	Q
16	(Netherlands) Vera Van Pol	13.600	13.066	11.066	12.733	50.465	–
17	(Sweden) Tonya Paulsson	13.300	13.166	12.500	11.400	50.366	Q
18	(Spain) Alba Petisco	13.033	13.100	11.466	12.733	50.332	Q
19	(Sweden) Emelie Westlund	12.900	13.333	11.733	11.866	49.832	Q
20	(Germany) Sarah Voss	13.400	13.266	11.666	11.400	49.732	Q
21	(Finland) Maisa Kuusikko	13.100	12.300	11.966	12.366	49.732	Q
22	(Sweden) Nathalie Westlund	13.033	12.233	11.966	12.200	49.432	–
23	(France) Morgane Osyssek-Reimer	13.400	10.566	12.800	12.633	49.399	Q
24	(Austria) Selina Kickinger	13.300	12.700	11.666	11.733	49.399	Q
25	(Norway) Maria Tronrud	12.833	12.233	11.566	12.666	49.298	Q
26	(Czech Republic) Alice Vlkova	13.200	12.100	11.533	12.400	49.233	Q
27	(Belgium) Maellyse Brassart	13.333	12.633	11.133	12.100	49.199	Q
28	(Slovakia) Barbora Mokosova	12.266	12.566	12.200	12.133	49.165	R1
29	(Austria) Bianca Frysak	12.766	12.633	11.800	11.866	49.065	R2
30	(Germany) Lea Marie Quaas	12.966	12.700	11.100	12.100	48.866	R3

==== Vault ====
Rank	Gymnast	Vault 1				Vault 2				Total	Qual.
Rank	Gymnast	D Score	E Score	Pen.	Score 1	D Score	E Score	Pen.	Score 2	Total	Qual.
1	(France) Coline Devillard	5.4	8.966		14.366	4.2	9.166		13.366	13.866	Q
2	(Belgium) Lisa Vaelen	5.4	8.766		14.166	4.4	8.666		13.066	13.616	Q
3	(Italy) Asia D'Amato	5.0	8.933		13.933	4.2	8.700		12.900	13.416	Q
4	(Denmark) Camille Rasmussen	5.0	8.700		13.700	4.4	8.633		13.033	13.366	Q
5	(Romania) Sabrina Voinea	5.0	8.700	0.100	13.600	4.0	8.733	0.300	12.433	13.016	Q
6	(Greece) Athanasia Mesiri	4.2	8.733		12.933	4.0	8.800		12.800	12.866	Q
7	(Turkey) Bilge Tarhan	4.2	8.600		12.800	4.0	8.733		12.733	12.766	Q
8	(Turkey) Ceren Biner	4.2	8.833		13.033	3.8	8.666		12.466	12.749	Q
9	(Turkey) Bengisu Yildiz	4.2	8.833		13.033	3.8	8.533		12.333	12.683	–
10	(Italy) Angela Andreoli	4.6	8.733	0.300	13.033	3.8	8.466		12.266	12.649	R1
11	(Denmark) Natalie Jensen	4.2	8.533		12.733	3.8	8.466		12.400	12.566	R2
12	(France) Djenna Laroui	3.8	8.666		12.466	3.8	8.733		12.533	12.499	R3

==== Uneven bars ====
Rank	Gymnast	D Score	E Score	Pen.	Total	Qual.
1	(Italy) Alice D'Amato	6.2	8.300		14.500	Q
2	(Netherlands) Naomi Visser	6.1	8.366		14.466	Q
3	(Germany) Elisabeth Seitz	6.1	8.300		14.400	Q
4	(United Kingdom) Becky Downie	6.3	8.066		14.366	Q
5	(Hungary) Zsófia Kovács	6.2	8.066		14.266	Q
6	(Italy) Giorgia Villa	5.8	8.366		14.166	Q
7	(Italy) Asia D'Amato	6.0	8.166		14.166	–
8	(Hungary) Zoja Szekely	5.9	8.166		14.066	Q
9	(Belgium) Lisa Vaelen	5.8	8.200		14.000	Q
10	(Belgium) Fien Enghels	5.8	8.133		13.933	R1
10	(United Kingdom) Georgia-Mae Fenton	5.8	8.133		13.933	R1
12	(United Kingdom) Jessica Gadirova	5.6	8.266		13.866	–
13	(Romania) Ana Bărbosu	6.2	7.400		13.600	R3

==== Balance beam ====
Rank	Gymnast	D Score	E Score	Pen.	Total	Qual.
1	(United Kingdom) Jessica Gadirova	5.8	7.800		13.600	Q
2	(Hungary) Zsófia Kovács	5.7	7.833		13.533	Q
3	(Netherlands) Sanne Wevers	5.9	7.533		13.433	Q
4	(United Kingdom) Ondine Achampong	5.7	7.666		13.366	Q
5	(Romania) Amalia Ghigoarță	5.3	7.833		13.133	Q
6	(Italy) Alice D'Amato	5.3	7.733		13.033	Q
7	(Belgium) Fien Enghels	5.2	7.633		12.833	Q
8	(Italy) Manila Esposito	5.6	7.233		12.833	Q
9	(Romania) Ana Bărbosu	5.3	7.500		12.800	R1
10	(France) Morgane Osyssek-Reimer	5.5	7.300		12.800	R2
11	(Netherlands) Naomi Visser	5.0	7.766		12.766	R3

==== Floor exercise ====
Rank	Gymnast	D Score	E Score	Pen.	Total	Qual.
1	(United Kingdom) Jessica Gadirova	5.8	8.100		13.900	Q
2	(Romania) Sabrina Voinea	6.0	7.700		13.700	Q
3	(Netherlands) Naomi Visser	5.8	7.866		13.666	Q
4	(United Kingdom) Alice Kinsella	5.5	7.966		13.466	Q
5	(Italy) Alice D'Amato	5.4	7.966		13.366	Q
6	(Hungary) Zsófia Kovács	5.7	7.566		13.266	Q
7	(Romania) Ana Bărbosu	5.5	7.733		13.233	Q
8	(United Kingdom) Ondine Achampong	5.3	7.866		13.166	–
9	(Spain) Laura Casabuena	5.2	7.900		13.100	Q
10	(Switzerland) Lena Bickel	5.3	7.733		13.033	R1
11	(Italy) Angela Andreoli	5.5	7.500		13.000	R2
12	(United Kingdom) Georgia-Mae Fenton	5.1	7.800		12.900	–
13	(France) Djenna Laroui	5.0	7.866		12.866	R3
