= Mirtill Makovits =

Hungarian artistic gymnast (born 2004)

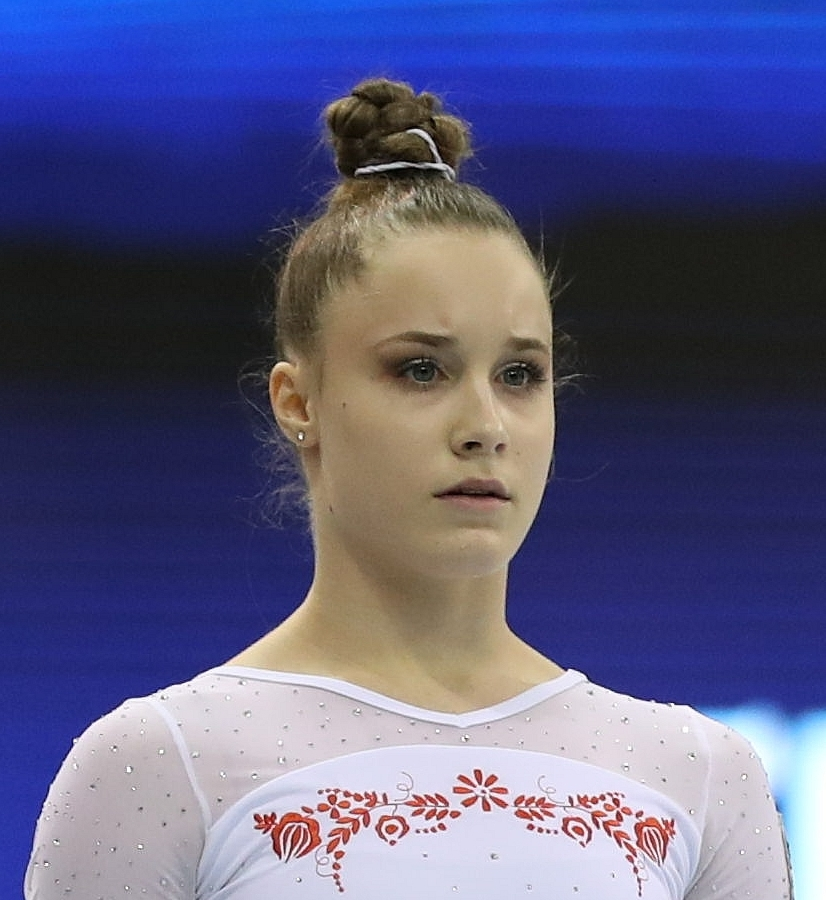
- Makovits at the 2019 Junior World Championships

Personal information
- Born: 30 March 2004 (age 22) Dunaújváros, Hungary

Gymnastics career
- Discipline: Women's artistic gymnastics
- Country represented: Hungary
- Club: Dunaferr
Medal record
Representing Hungary
Women's artistic Gymnastics
European Championships
Bronze medal – third place	2020 Mersin	Team

Mirtill Makovits (born 30 March 2004) is a Hungarian artistic gymnast. She won a bronze medal at the 2020 European Championships with the Hungarian team.

== Career ==
=== Junior ===
Makovits finished 5th in the all-around and 4th on the uneven bars at the 2018 Olympic Hopes Cup in Liberec, Czech Republic. She competed at the 2019 Elek Matolay Memorial where she won the gold medal in the all-around and on the uneven bars, as well as a silver medal on the balance beam. She won the silver medal on the floor exercise behind Lisa Vaelen at the International GymSport in Porto, Portugal. She competed at the 2019 Junior World Championships in Győr with Nikolett Szilágyi and Hanna Szujó, and they finished 16th as a team, and Makovits finished 17th in the all-around. Then she competed at the 2019 European Youth Summer Olympic Festival with Szujo, and they finished 7th as a team, and Makovits finished 10th in the all-around final.

=== Senior ===
Makovits became eligible for senior competition in 2020, although her opportunities to compete internationally were limited due to the COVID-19 pandemic. In October, she won the gold medal on the uneven bars at the National Championships. She competed with Csenge Bácskay, Dorina Böczögő, Zsófia Kovács, and Zója Székely at the 2020 European Championships, and they won the bronze medal in the team final behind Ukraine and Romania. Makovits competed on three events in the team final, scoring 12.866 on the uneven bars, 11.233 on the balance beam, and 11.033 on the floor exercise.

At the 2021 Hungarian Event Championships, Makovits finished 5th on the uneven bars and the floor exercise.

At the 2022 European Championships in Munich, Makovits helped Hungary qualify to the team final, where they finished seventh.
