= Katalin Müller-Száll =

Hungarian gymnast (born 1943)

Personal information
- Nationality: Hungarian
- Born: 13 September 1943 (age 81); Budapest, Hungary

Sport
- Sport: Gymnastics

Katalin Müller-Száll (born 13 September 1943) is a Hungarian gymnast. She competed at the 1960 Summer Olympics, the 1964 Summer Olympics and the 1968 Summer Olympics.
