= Márta Tolnai-Erdős =

Hungarian gymnast

Personal information
- Nationality: Hungarian
- Born: 23 August 1941; Pécs, Hungary
- Died: 5 July 2012 (aged 70); Pécs, Hungary

Sport
- Sport: Gymnastics

Márta Tolnai-Erdős (23 August 1941 – 5 July 2012) was a Hungarian gymnast. She competed at the 1964 Summer Olympics and the 1968 Summer Olympics.
