= Zója Székely =

Hungarian artistic gymnast

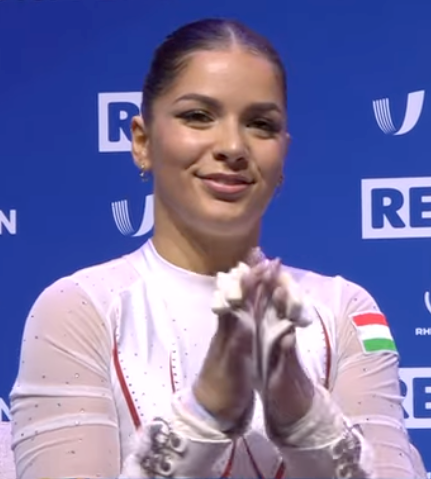
- Székely at the 2025 World University Games

Personal information
- Born: 5 May 2003 (age 23) Budapest, Hungary
- Height: 160 cm (5 ft 3 in)

Gymnastics career
- Discipline: Women's artistic gymnastics
- Country represented: Hungary; (2013–present)
- Club: Postás SE
Medal record
Representing Hungary
Women's artistic Gymnastics
European Championships
Silver medal – second place	2020 Mersin	Uneven bars
Bronze medal – third place	2020 Mersin	Team
World University Games
Silver medal – second place	2025 Rhine-Ruhr	Uneven bars
FIG World Cup
Event / 1st / 2nd / 3rd; World Challenge Cup / 3 / 4 / 2

Zója Székely (born 5 May 2003) is a Hungarian artistic gymnast. She is the 2020 European silver medalist on the uneven bars and bronze medalist with the team. She represented Hungary at the 2024 Summer Olympics.

== Career ==
Székely competed at the 2018 Junior European Championships alongside Bianka Schermann, Csenge Bácskay, Hanna Szujó, and Regina Medved, and they placed ninth in the team competition. Individually, she placed eighteenth in the all-around with a score of 49.999. She also placed sixth in the uneven bars event final with a score of 13.666.

Székely made her senior international debut at the 2019 Doha World Cup where she competed on the uneven bars and balance beam, but she did not qualify for the event finals. She then competed at the 2019 European Championships where she finished fifty-ninth in the all-around during the qualification round. At the 2019 Koper World Cup, she finished fourth on the uneven bars. She was the selected to represent Hungary at the 2019 European Games, and she qualified for the all-around final where she finished seventeenth.

Székely won the gold medal in the all-around at the 2020 Hungarian Championships. She was then selected to compete at the 2020 European Championships alongside Csenge Bácskay, Dorina Böczögő, Zsófia Kovács, and Mirtill Makovits. She won the bronze medal with the team behind Ukraine and Romania. She won the silver medal in the uneven bars event final behind Kovács.

Székely competed at the 2021 European Championships. She was initially the second reserve for the all-around final, but she was put in after Larisa Iordache withdrew due to a kidney infection. She placed sixteenth with a total score of 50.632.

At the 2022 European Championships in Munich, Székely helped Hungary qualify to the team final, where they finished seventh.

For the 2024 Olympic Games Hungary earned one non-nominative Olympic berth. Originally they gave the berth to Zsófia Kovács due to her achieving a higher score on the uneven bars at RomGym Trophy tournament, which was the lone event the Hungarian Gymnastics Federation was using to determine to whom they would give the Olympic berth. However, during podium training at the Olympics, Kovács injured her knee and was unable to compete; Székely was substituted in two days before she had to compete in qualifications. During qualifications Székely only competed on the uneven bars; she placed 34th and did not qualify for the final.

At the 2025 World University Games Székely won silver on uneven bars behind Yang Fanyuwei.

== Competitive history ==
Competitive history of Zója Székely
Year	Event	Team	AA	VT	UB	BB	FX
2020	Szombathely Challenge Cup				6		7
2020	Hungarian Championships		1st place, gold medalist(s)	3rd place, bronze medalist(s)	2nd place, silver medalist(s)		3rd place, bronze medalist(s)
2020	Hungarian Master Championships	3rd place, bronze medalist(s)	3rd place, bronze medalist(s)	6	4		3rd place, bronze medalist(s)
2020	European Championships	3rd place, bronze medalist(s)			2nd place, silver medalist(s)		7
2021	Hungarian Super Team Championships	2nd place, silver medalist(s)	7				
2021	Hungarian Event Championships			3rd place, bronze medalist(s)	2nd place, silver medalist(s)	3rd place, bronze medalist(s)	3rd place, bronze medalist(s)
2021	European Championships		16				
2021	Cairo Challenge Cup				2nd place, silver medalist(s)	5	1st place, gold medalist(s)
2021	FIT Challenge	9			6		
2021	Koper Challenge Cup				2nd place, silver medalist(s)	3rd place, bronze medalist(s)	
2021	Mersin Challenge Cup				1st place, gold medalist(s)		
2021	Hungarian Grand Prix				2nd place, silver medalist(s)	3rd place, bronze medalist(s)	
2021	Hungarian Championships		4	5	1st place, gold medalist(s)		3rd place, bronze medalist(s)
2021	World Championships		R2				
2021	Hungarian Masters Championships	1st place, gold medalist(s)			2nd place, silver medalist(s)	3rd place, bronze medalist(s)	
2022	Elek Matolay Memorial		6	5	2nd place, silver medalist(s)		4
2022	Osijek Challenge Cup				1st place, gold medalist(s)		
2022	Koper Challenge Cup				2nd place, silver medalist(s)		5
2022	Austrian Team Challenge	1st place, gold medalist(s)	12				
2022	Hungarian Championships		2nd place, silver medalist(s)	4	2nd place, silver medalist(s)		6
2022	European Championships	7					
2022	Paris Challenge Cup				8		
2022	Szombathely Challenge Cup				1st place, gold medalist(s)		
2022	Hungarian Event Championships				1st place, gold medalist(s)		
2022	World Championships	14					
2022	Hungarian Masters Championships				1st place, gold medalist(s)		
2023	Hungarian Team Championships	3rd place, bronze medalist(s)	2nd place, silver medalist(s)	2nd place, silver medalist(s)	2nd place, silver medalist(s)	6	4
2023	Elek Matolay Memorial				1st place, gold medalist(s)	2nd place, silver medalist(s)	
2023	European Championships	4	17		6		
2023	Szombathely Challenge Cup				1st place, gold medalist(s)		
2023	Hungarian Championships	3rd place, bronze medalist(s)	2nd place, silver medalist(s)	2nd place, silver medalist(s)	1st place, gold medalist(s)	6	
2023	World Championships	15					
2023	Hungarian Masters Championships		1st place, gold medalist(s)	3rd place, bronze medalist(s)	1st place, gold medalist(s)	5	2nd place, silver medalist(s)
2024	Hungarian Championships	2nd place, silver medalist(s)	2nd place, silver medalist(s)	3rd place, bronze medalist(s)	1st place, gold medalist(s)	3rd place, bronze medalist(s)	
2024	European Championships	10	9		8		
2024	Koper Challenge Cup				2nd place, silver medalist(s)		
2024	RomGym Trophy				6		
2024	Olympic Games				34		
2025
2025	European Championships	8	18		7		
2025	World University Games				2nd place, silver medalist(s)		
2025	Szombathely World Challenge Cup				1st place, gold medalist(s)		
2025	World Championships	—N/a	DNF		8		
