= Zsófia Kovács (gymnast) =

Hungarian artistic gymnast

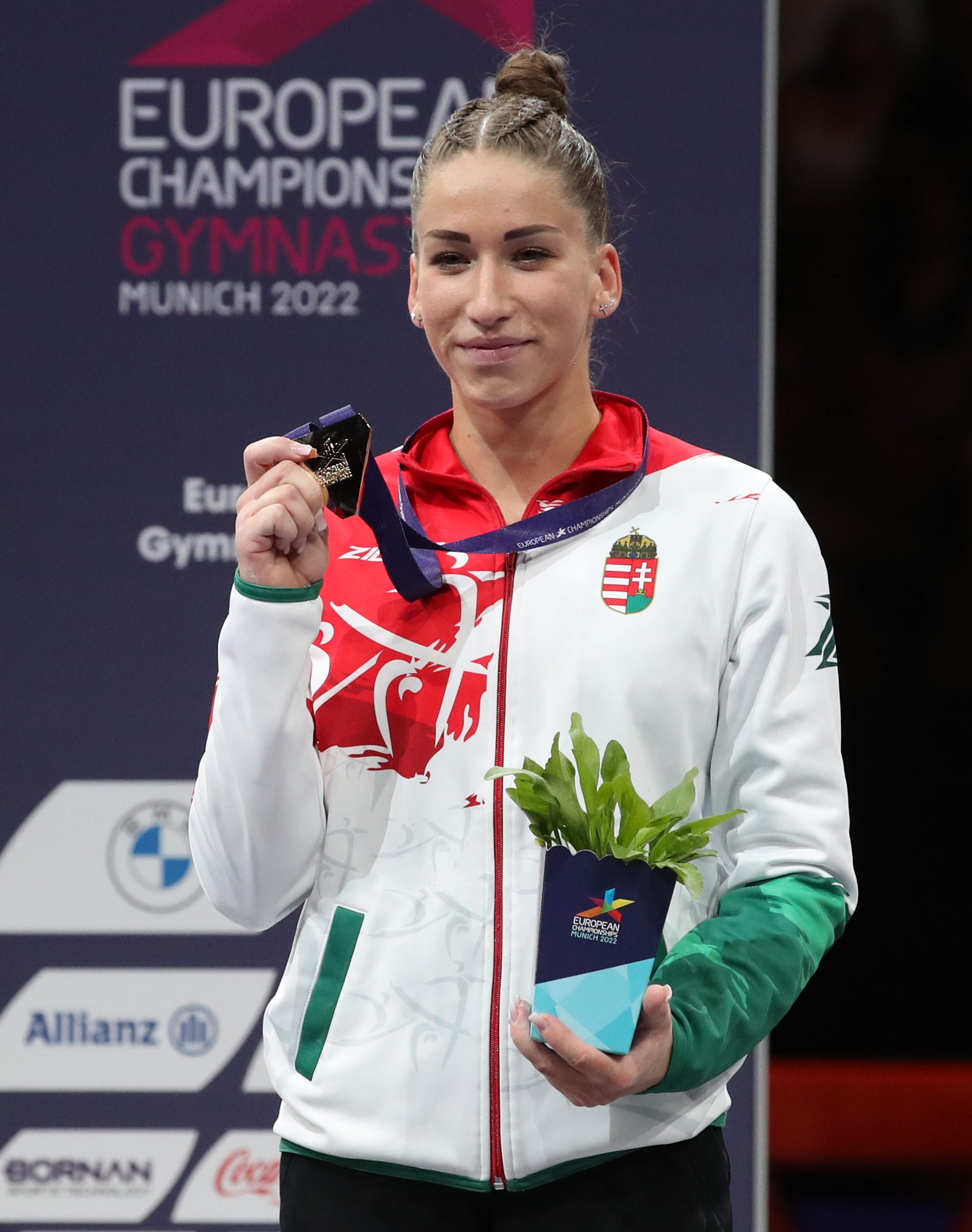
- Kovács at the 2022 European Championships

Personal information
- Born: 6 April 2000 (age 26)
- Height: 1.57 m (5 ft 2 in)

Gymnastics career
- Discipline: Women's artistic gymnastics
- Country represented: Hungary; (2014–present)
Medal record
Artistic gymnastics
Representing Hungary
European Championships
Gold medal – first place	2020 Mersin	Vault
Gold medal – first place	2020 Mersin	Uneven Bars
Gold medal – first place	2022 Munich	Vault
Silver medal – second place	2017 Cluj-Napoca	All-Around
Silver medal – second place	2023 Antalya	All-Around
Bronze medal – third place	2020 Mersin	Team
Bronze medal – third place	2023 Antalya	Balance Beam
FIG World Cup
Event	1st	2nd	3rd
Apparatus World Cup	2	3	1
World Challenge Cup	8	4	3
Total	10	7	4

Zsófia Kovács (Hungarian pronunciation: [ˈʒoːfijɒ ˈkovaːt͡ʃ]; born 6 April 2000) is a Hungarian artistic gymnast who competed at the 2016 and 2020 Olympic Games. She is the 2017 and 2023 European all-around silver medalist, the 2020 European champion on uneven bars, as well as the 2020 and 2022 European champion on vault.

== Early life ==
Kovács was born on 6 April 2000 in Dunaújváros. She started gymnastics at the age of six.

== Junior gymnastics career ==
Kovács competed at the 2014 European Championships where she placed nineteenth in the all-around. At the 2015 European Youth Olympic Festival Kovács finished fifth in the all-around, fourth on vault, and seventh on both uneven bars and balance beam.

== Senior gymnastics career ==
=== 2016 ===
Kovács became age-eligible for senior competition in 2016, and made her senior debut at the Austrian Team Open, where she won the all-around ahead of Giulia Steingruber and Barbora Mokošová. She then competed at the Doha World Challenge Cup, where she took the bronze medal on floor behind Steingruber and Diana Bulimar.

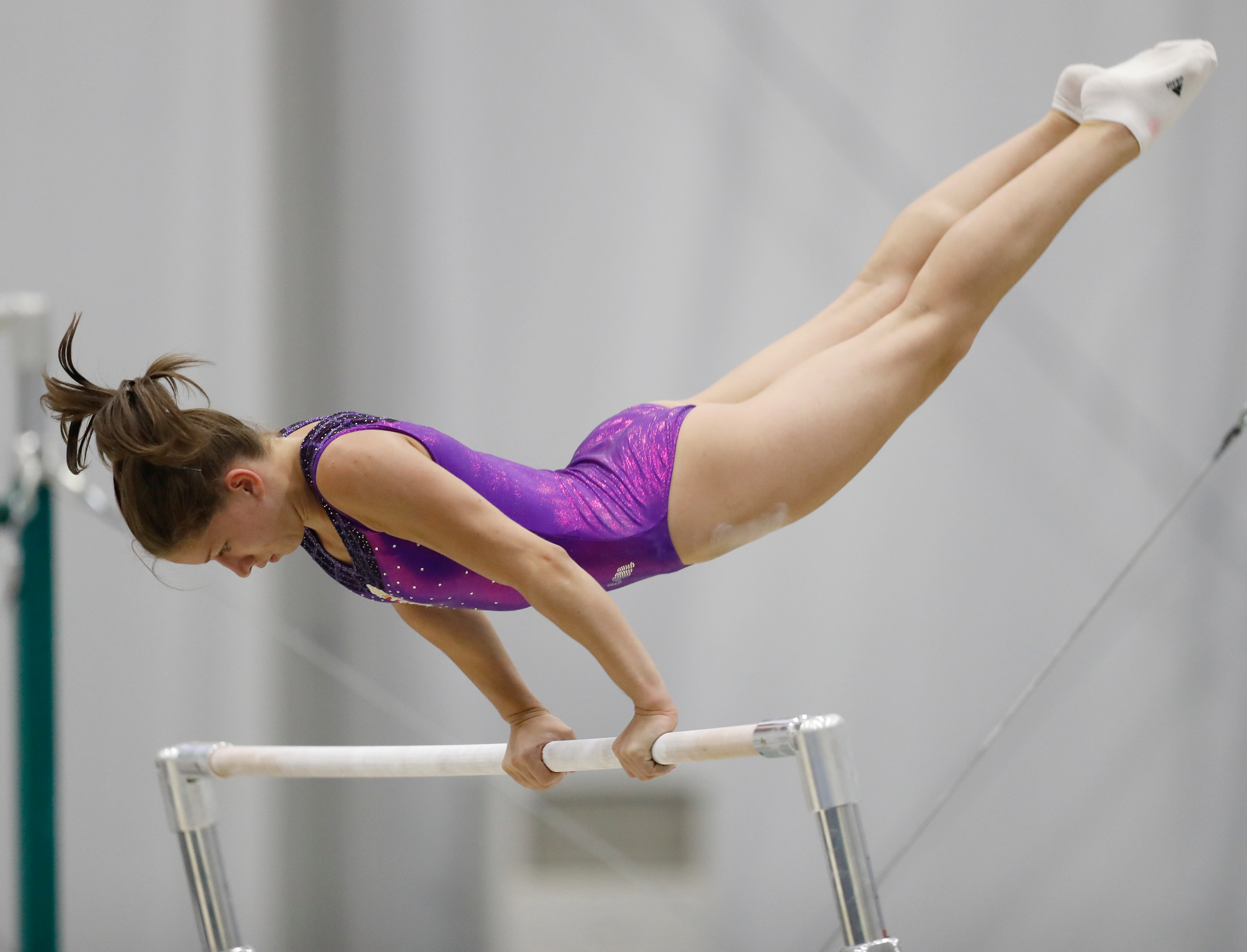
Kovács training at the 2016 Olympics

In April, Kovács competed at the Olympic Test Event in Rio de Janeiro, which served as a qualifier for the 2016 Summer Olympics. She finished fourteenth in the all-around, earning an individual berth for the Olympic Games. In the qualification round of the Olympic Games, Kovács placed 33rd in the all-around and did not advance to any finals.

Following the Olympics, Kovács competed at the Szombathely World Challenge Cup, where she won the bronze medal on the uneven bars. She also competed at the Cottbus World Cup, where she won the gold medals on uneven bars and balance beam, and also picked up the bronze on vault.

Also in 2016, she performed in the German Gymnastics Bundesliga (premier league) for the team TZ DSHS Köln. On the second competition day, she showed the best all-around performance of all gymnasts.

=== 2017–2018 ===
At the 2017 European Championships in Cluj-Napoca, Kovács won the silver medal in the all-around behind Ellie Downie, becoming the first Hungarian woman to land on the podium since Adrienn Varga did so in 1998 when she won vault. Additionally Kovács finished sixth on vault, uneven bars, and balance beam. She also competed at the 2017 World Championships in Montreal, but did not make any finals.

Kovács was forced to miss the 2018 European Championships due to an abdominal injury. However, she competed at the 2018 Szombathely World Challenge Cup, where she won the gold medal on balance beam final. She went on to compete at the 2018 World Championships in Doha, where she qualified to the all-around final, finishing twentieth with a score of 51.765.

=== 2019–2020 ===
In March Kovács competed at the 2019 Stuttgart World Cup and placed ninth in the all-around. In April she had to withdraw from the 2019 European Championships due to a foot injury. She returned to competition at the Koper World Challenge Cup in June, where she won the gold medals on the uneven bars and balance beam. In September, Kovács competed at the Paris World Challenge Cup, where she took the bronze medal on the uneven bars behind Mélanie de Jesus dos Santos and Anastasia Agafonova. In October she competed at the 2019 World Championships in Stuttgart, where she placed thirtieth in the all-around during qualifications. Although she did not qualify to the all-around final, she earned an individual berth to compete at the 2020 Summer Olympics.

Most competitions in 2020 were canceled or postponed due to the global COVID-19 pandemic. In December Kovács competed at the rescheduled 2020 European Championships in Mersin, where the Hungarian team of Kovács, Csenge Bácskay, Dorina Böczögő, Mirtill Makovits, and Zója Székely won the bronze medal behind Ukraine and Romania. The Hungarian team's placement on the podium was the first time in European Championship history. Individually Kovács won gold on vault and uneven bars with scores of 14.050 (the average score of 14.350 and 13.750) and 13.850 respectively.

=== 2021 ===
Kovács competed on the uneven bars and balance beam at the 2021 European Championships, but did not make the finals. At the 2021 Osijek World Challenge Cup she won silver on the uneven bars behind Nina Derwael. She next competed at the Doha World Cup and won silver on the balance beam behind Diana Varinska.

Kovács represented Hungary at the 2020 Summer Olympics in Tokyo, her second Olympic Games. In the qualification round, she qualified to the all-around final, and placed fourteenth on the uneven bars, making her the third reserve for the final. In the all-around final, she finished fourteenth with a score of 53.433.

Kovács then competed at the 2021 World Championships in Kitakyushu, but was limited to the uneven bars due to a leg injury. She qualified to the uneven bars final, where she finished fifth.

=== 2022 ===
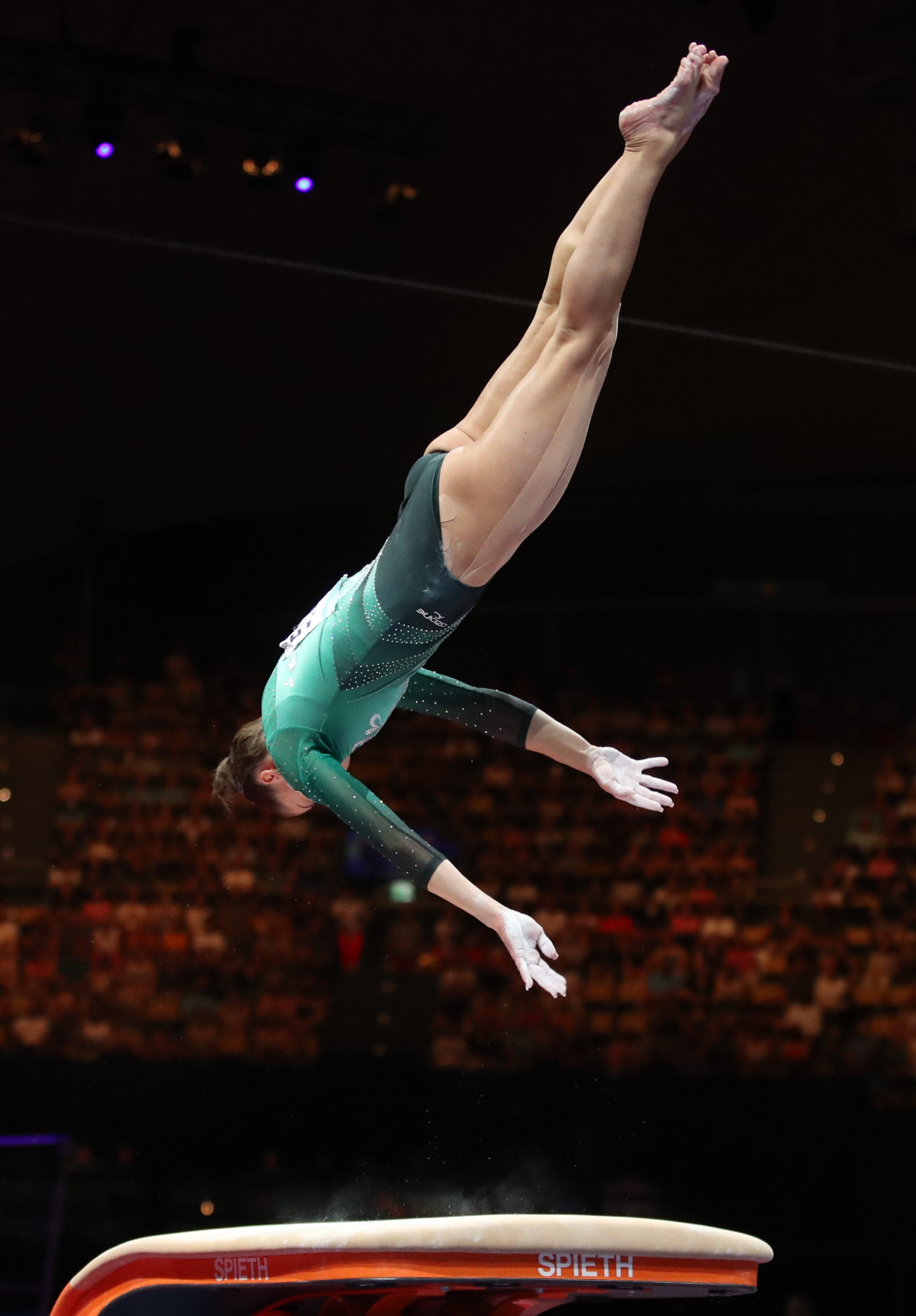
Kovács at the 2022 European Championships

Kovács started her 2022 season at the Cairo World Cup, where she took the silver medal on the balance beam. In June, she competed at the Koper World Challenge Cup, winning three gold medals on vault, uneven bars and balance beam.

In August, Kovács competed at the 2022 European Championships in Munich, where she was considered to be one of the favorites to medal in the all-around. However, in the qualification round of the competition, which also determined the all-around results, she fell twice on the balance beam and also fell on her uneven bars dismount. Despite the falls, she managed to score 52.765, finishing ninth in the all-around. Additionally, she qualified to the vault final in first place as well as the floor exercise final in seventh place, and helped Hungary qualify to the team final. Hungary finished seventh in the team final. In the vault final, Kovács won the gold medal ahead of Asia D'Amato and Aline Friess, winning her second European title on the event. In the floor exercise final, she fell on her third tumbling pass and placed eighth.

At the 2022 World Championships in Liverpool, Kovács was limited to the balance beam due to an abdominal muscle injury. She qualified to the final, where she finished seventh.

=== 2023–2024 ===
At the 2023 European Championships, Kovács helped Hungary finish fourth in the team competition. Additionally, she qualified to the all-around, uneven bars, balance beam, and floor exercise finals. During the all-around final, she won the silver medal behind Jessica Gadirova. During apparatus finals she placed fifth on the uneven bars, eighth on floor exercise, and won the bronze medal on the balance beam.

In September, Kovács tore her ACL and was unable to compete at the 2023 World Championships.

Kovács returned to competition in June 2024 to compete at the RomGym Trophy. During qualifications she scored a 10.600 on the uneven bars and initially did not qualify to the final. However, after Ana Filipa Martins withdrew, Kovács was substituted into the final where she scored 14.200 and won the silver medal Kaylia Nemour. As a result, the Hungarian Gymnastics Federation decided to give their non-nominative Olympic berth to Kovács. During podium training at the 2024 Olympic Games Kovács injured her knee and was unable to compete; she was replaced by Zója Székely.

== Competitive History ==
Competitive history of Zsófia Kovács
Year	Event	Team	AA	VT	UB	BB	FX
2014
2014	Junior European Championships	10	19				
2015	European Youth Olympic Festival	10	5	4	7	7	
2015	AUS-HUN-POL Friendly	3rd place, bronze medalist(s)	4				
2016	Austrian Team Open	2nd place, silver medalist(s)	1st place, gold medalist(s)				
2016	Doha World Cup			4	4	4	3rd place, bronze medalist(s)
2016	Olympic Test Event		14				
2016	National Championships				1st place, gold medalist(s)		
2016	European Championships	8		7	5		
2016	Olympic Games		33				
2016	Szombathely Challenge Cup				3rd place, bronze medalist(s)	4	
2016	2nd Bundesliga		1st place, gold medalist(s)				
2016	3rd Bundesliga		3rd place, bronze medalist(s)				
2016	Cottbus World Cup			3rd place, bronze medalist(s)	1st place, gold medalist(s)	1st place, gold medalist(s)	5
2017	WOGA Classic		2nd place, silver medalist(s)				
2017	Doha World Cup			4	2nd place, silver medalist(s)	8	4
2017	European Championships		2nd place, silver medalist(s)	6	6	6	
2017	Osijek World Cup			2nd place, silver medalist(s)	2nd place, silver medalist(s)	6	
2017	National Championships				1st place, gold medalist(s)	1st place, gold medalist(s)	
2017	Szombathely Challenge Cup				2nd place, silver medalist(s)	2nd place, silver medalist(s)	
2018	Elek Matolay Memorial		1st place, gold medalist(s)			2nd place, silver medalist(s)	1st place, gold medalist(s)
2018	Osijek Challenge Cup						2nd place, silver medalist(s)
2018	Hungarian Championships		3rd place, bronze medalist(s)		3rd place, bronze medalist(s)	3rd place, bronze medalist(s)	
2018	Szombathely Challenge Cup					1st place, gold medalist(s)	
2018	World Championships		20				
2018	Hungarian Masters Championships		1st place, gold medalist(s)		1st place, gold medalist(s)	1st place, gold medalist(s)	2nd place, silver medalist(s)
2018	Joaquin Blume Memorial		2nd place, silver medalist(s)	1st place, gold medalist(s)	2nd place, silver medalist(s)	3rd place, bronze medalist(s)	3rd place, bronze medalist(s)
2019	Stuttgart World Cup		8				
2019	Elek Matolay Memorial		1st place, gold medalist(s)		5	6	
2019	Koper Challenge Cup				1st place, gold medalist(s)	1st place, gold medalist(s)	
2019	Paris Challenge Cup				3rd place, bronze medalist(s)		5
2020
2020	European Championships	3rd place, bronze medalist(s)		1st place, gold medalist(s)	1st place, gold medalist(s)		
2021	Osijek Challenge Cup				2nd place, silver medalist(s)		
2021	Doha World Cup				6	2nd place, silver medalist(s)	5
2021	Olympic Games		14		R3		
2021	World Championships				5		
2022	Cairo World Cup					2nd place, silver medalist(s)	
2022	Koper Challenge Cup			1st place, gold medalist(s)	1st place, gold medalist(s)	1st place, gold medalist(s)	
2022	European Championships	7	9	1st place, gold medalist(s)			8
2022	World Championships					7	
2023
2023	European Championships	4	2nd place, silver medalist(s)		5	3rd place, bronze medalist(s)	8
2023	Varna Challenge Cup				1st place, gold medalist(s)		
2024	RomGym Trophy				2nd place, silver medalist(s)		
2025	Szombathely World Challenge Cup				6		
2026	Koper World Challenge Cup				1st place, gold medalist(s)		
2026	European Championships	14					
