= Dorina Böczögő =

Hungarian artistic gymnast

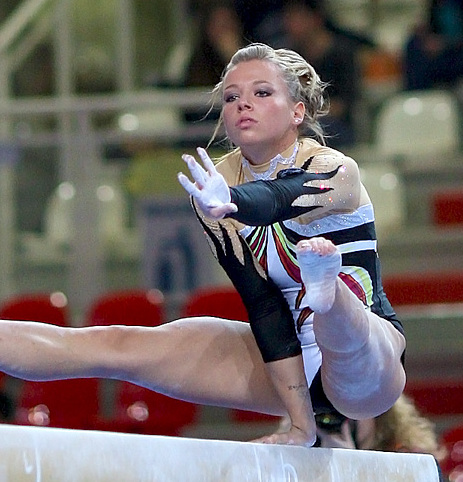
- Böczögő in 2012

Personal information
- Full name: Dorina Böczögő
- Nickname: Dodo
- Born: 15 February 1992 (age 34) Orosháza, Hungary

Gymnastics career
- Discipline: Women's artistic gymnastics
- Country represented: Hungary
Medal record
Artistic gymnastics
Representing Hungary
Event / 1st / 2nd / 3rd; FIG World Cup / 5 / 4 / 5
European Championships
Bronze medal – third place	2020 Mersin	Team

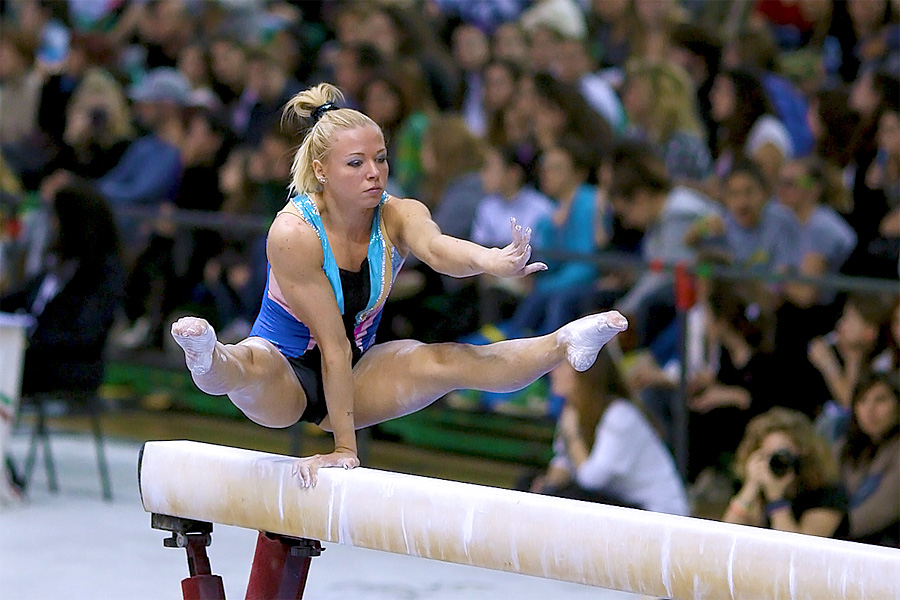
Böczögő performing her one arm press hold during her balance beam mount, 2013.

Dorina Böczögő (born 15 February 1992 in Orosháza) is a Hungarian artistic gymnast who competed at the 2008 and 2012 Summer Olympics. She was a member of the team who won bronze at the 2020 European Championships.

== Career ==
=== 2007–2008 ===
At the 2007 World Championships, Böczögő finished 51st in the all-around with a total score of 55.150. As one of the top nine athletes from a country that had not qualified through team placement, she earned a spot at the 2008 Summer Olympics. It was the first of 8 World Championships she participated in. At the Olympics, Böczögő finished 52nd in the all-around with a total score of 54.450. She finished 12th on vault, and was just 0.013 away from being a reserve for the vault final. Earlier that year, she competed at the European Championships in Clermont-Ferrand, where the Hungarian team finished in thirteenth. She finished seventeenth in the all-around with a total score of 53.300.

Böczögő competed at several World Cup events in 2008. The first was in Doha in March, where she placed fourth on vault. In April, she competed in Maribor and finished eighth on vault. In May, she finished seventh on vault in Tianjin. The first World Cup medal Böczögő won was a bronze on vault in Szombathely on 4 October 2008. She also finished fifth on bars at that event. Böczögő won her first World Cup gold later that month by scoring a 13.675 on vault in Glasgow. She also finished fourth on beam and floor. She once again won gold on vault in Ostrava. She also won a silver medal on floor with a score of 14.200, which was only 0.050 behind gold medalist Jiang Yuyuan of China. These results qualified Böczögő for the 2008 World Cup Final on vault, where she finished fifth.

=== 2009–2011 ===
Böczögő won the 2009 Hungarian national all-around title with a 55.700, more than 3.5 points better than second-place Laura Gombás. She won the national titles on vault, uneven bars, and balance beam, and she won silver on floor behind Tünde Csillag. In November, she competed at the Osijek World Cup, where she finished seventh on vault, fifth on uneven bars, and sixth on floor. At the 2009 World Championships, Böczögő finished 30th in the all-around qualification with a 51.750.

In 2010, Böczögő competed on vault, uneven bars, and floor at the European Championships to help the Hungarian team finish twelfth. In September, she competed at the Ghent World Cup finishing fifth on uneven bars and seventh on floor.

=== 2012–13 ===
At the 2012 Artistic Gymnastics Olympic Test Event, Böczögő and Gombás both qualified to represent Hungary at the 2012 Summer Olympics. However, only one of them could compete, and the NOC decided to send Böczögő. At the 2012 Summer Olympics, Böczögő finished 49th in the all-around with a 50.599.

Böczögő competed at the 2013 European Championships where she placed 22nd in the all-around competition. She next competed at the 2013 Summer Universiade where she placed 9th in the all-around.

She was unable to compete at the 2016 Olympics, as Hungary only qualified one athlete and Zsófia Kovács had achieved better results. Böczögő was injured for most of 2017. She won the Hungarian national title in 2018.

=== 2020-2022 ===
She was a member of the team who won bronze at the 2020 European Championships. This was the first ever medal for Hungary in the team event. She was Hungarian champion in 2021. In 2022, she won gold on floor exercise at the World Cup of Cairo, silver at World Cup of Baku, and at the World Cup of Doha. She ranked first overall in the floor exercise in the 2022 World Cup series. She achieved this despite also coaching Csenge Bácskay while training.

== Competitive history ==
Competitive history of Dorina Böczögő
Year	Event	Team	AA	VT	UB	BB	FX
2007	Leverkusen Cup	3rd place, bronze medalist(s)	1st place, gold medalist(s)				
2007	World Championships		51				
2008	Doha World Cup			4			
2008	European Championships	13	17				
2008	Maribor World Cup			8			
2008	Tianjin World Cup			7			
2008	Olympic Games		52	12			
2008	Szombathely World Cup			3rd place, bronze medalist(s)	5		
2008	Glasgow World Cup			1st place, gold medalist(s)		4	4
2008	Ostrava World Cup			1st place, gold medalist(s)			2nd place, silver medalist(s)
2008	World Cup Final			5			
2009	National Championships		1st place, gold medalist(s)	1st place, gold medalist(s)	1st place, gold medalist(s)	1st place, gold medalist(s)	2nd place, silver medalist(s)
2009	World Championships		30				
2009	Osijek World Cup			7	5		6
2010
2010	European Championships	12					
2010	Ghent World Cup				5		7
2011
2011	European Championships		17				
2011	Ghent World Cup			4			
2012
2012	European Championships		17	8			
2012	Maribor World Cup			2nd place, silver medalist(s)	8	6	
2012	Olympic Games		49				
2012	Éva Kanyó Memorial					1st place, gold medalist(s)	
2013
2013	European Championships		22				
2013	Summer Universiade		9				
2013	Hungarian Grand Prix		2nd place, silver medalist(s)		3rd place, bronze medalist(s)		1st place, gold medalist(s)
2013	World Championships		R4				
2013	Sokol Grand Prix						3rd place, bronze medalist(s)
2014	Doha World Cup			6	5	5	6
2014	Osijek World Cup			7			
2014	National Championships						2nd place, silver medalist(s)
2014	Magyar Grand Prix		1st place, gold medalist(s)		1st place, gold medalist(s)		1st place, gold medalist(s)
2015	Cottbus World Cup				4		6
2015	Ljubljana World Cup				4	6	4
2015	Anadia World Cup				4		1st place, gold medalist(s)
2015	European Games	9	7				
2016	Baku Challenge Cup			4		7	4
2016	Ljubljana Challenge Cup			6	7		3rd place, bronze medalist(s)
2016	Osijek Challenge Cup				7		7
2016	Hungarian Championships		3rd place, bronze medalist(s)	3rd place, bronze medalist(s)	2nd place, silver medalist(s)	2nd place, silver medalist(s)	1st place, gold medalist(s)
2016	Varna Challenge Cup					7	6
2016	European Championships	8					
2016	Hungarian Event Championships			2nd place, silver medalist(s)		3rd place, bronze medalist(s)	1st place, gold medalist(s)
2016	Szombathely Challenge Cup			5			1st place, gold medalist(s)
2016	Joaquim Blume Memorial		5				
2016	Cottbus World Cup			2nd place, silver medalist(s)	2nd place, silver medalist(s)	3rd place, bronze medalist(s)	4
2016	Győr Trophy		1st place, gold medalist(s)	1st place, gold medalist(s)	2nd place, silver medalist(s)	4	1st place, gold medalist(s)
2017	Matsz-Swietelsky Cup				6		1st place, gold medalist(s)
2017	Elek Matolay Memorial					5	
2018	Elek Matolay Memorial		6		6		2nd place, silver medalist(s)
2018	Osijek Challenge Cup				5		5
2018	Koper Challenge Cup				3rd place, bronze medalist(s)		6
2018	Budapest Friendly	1st place, gold medalist(s)	4				
2018	Hungarian Event Championships				2nd place, silver medalist(s)	2nd place, silver medalist(s)	1st place, gold medalist(s)
2018	European Championships	8					
2018	Hungarian Championships		1st place, gold medalist(s)	2nd place, silver medalist(s)	1st place, gold medalist(s)	2nd place, silver medalist(s)	1st place, gold medalist(s)
2018	Szombathely Challenge Cup						1st place, gold medalist(s)
2018	Hungarian Masters Championships		3rd place, bronze medalist(s)	1st place, gold medalist(s)	4	5	1st place, gold medalist(s)
2019	HUN League Championships					6	2nd place, silver medalist(s)
2019	DTB Team Challenge	7					
2019	Elek Matolay Memorial		4				
2019	Hungarian Championships		4	1st place, gold medalist(s)	5	5	1st place, gold medalist(s)
2019	2nd Heerenveen Friendly	4	20				
2019	World Championships	18	69				
2019	Hungarian Master Championships		2nd place, silver medalist(s)	1st place, gold medalist(s)	5	4	2nd place, silver medalist(s)
2020	Hungarian Championships					3rd place, bronze medalist(s)	1st place, gold medalist(s)
2020	Hungarian Master Championships					5	2nd place, silver medalist(s)
2020	European Championships	3rd place, bronze medalist(s)					8
2021	Mersin Challenge Cup			5			2nd place, silver medalist(s)
2022	Doha World Cup			6			3rd place, bronze medalist(s)
2022	Cairo World Cup						1st place, gold medalist(s)
2022	Baku World Cup						2nd place, silver medalist(s)
