= Swiss Cup (gymnastics) =

Annual gymnastics competition

The Swiss Cup or Swiss Cup Zürich is an annual artistic gymnastics competition held in Zürich, Switzerland. The first iteration was held in 1982.

Unlike most artistic gymnastics competitions, the Swiss Cup is a mixed pairs event and features an elimination system. Each team consists of a male and a female gymnast from the same country. Both of them compete on all events of their gender (so the women on vault, beam, uneven bars and floor, and the men on floor, pommel horse, rings, vault, parallel bars and high bar), and their scores are added together.

== Past champions ==
Swiss Cup results
Year	Gold	Silver	Bronze
1982	Soviet Union; Natalia Solovei; Dmitry Bilozerchev	Switzerland; Romi Kessler; Marco Piatti	United States; Michelle Dusserre; Phil Cahoy
1983	Not held		
1984	Romania / Switzerland; Simona Păucă; Daniel Wunderlin		
1985	China; Yang Yanli; Li Ning		
1986	Romania; Ecaterina Szabo; Marian Rizan		
1987	Romania; Daniela Silivaș; Nicusor Pascu		
1988	Romania; Gabriela Potorac; Marius Tobă		
1989	United States; Kim Zmeskal; Lance Ringnald		
1990	Soviet Union; Natalia Lashchenova; Valery Belenky		
1991	United States; Shannon Miller; Scott Keswick		
1992	Belarus; Svetlana Boginskaya; Vitaly Scherbo		
1993	Belarus; Elena Piskun; Vitaly Scherbo		
1994–1999 not held
2000	Russia; Elena Zamolodchikova; Alexei Bondarenko		
2001	Romania; Silvia Stroescu; Marian Drăgulescu		
2002	Romania / Australia; Monica Roșu; Philippe Rizzo		
2003	Romania; Oana Ban; Marian Drăgulescu		
2004	Romania; Cătălina Ponor; Marius Urzică		
2005	China; Han Bing; Teng Haibin	Romania; Sandra Izbașa; Răzvan Șelariu	France; Émilie Le Pennec; Yann Cucherat
2006	Germany / Bulgaria; Oksana Chusovitina; Yordan Yovchev	Romania; Steliana Nistor; Marian Drăgulescu	Switzerland; Ariella Käslin; Niki Böschenstein
2007	Romania; Steliana Nistor; Flavius Koczi	Germany; Oksana Chusovitina; Evgenij Spiridonov	Russia; Svetlana Klyukina; Sergei Korokordin
2008	China; Ning He; Bo Lu	Romania; Sandra Izbașa; Flavius Koczi	Russia; Ksenia Afanasyeva; Maksim Devyatovskiy
2009	Germany; Kim Bui; Matthias Fahrig	Germany; Elisabeth Seitz; Thomas Taranu	Switzerland; Ariella Käslin; Niki Böschenstein
2010	Germany; Elisabeth Seitz; Fabian Hambüchen	Italy; Vanessa Ferrari; Matteo Morandi	Switzerland; Ariella Käslin; Claudio Capelli
2011	Switzerland; Giulia Steingruber; Claudio Capelli	Germany; Elisabeth Seitz; Fabian Hambüchen	Russia; Anna Dementyeva; Nikita Ignatyev
2012	Germany; Elisabeth Seitz; Fabian Hambüchen	Switzerland; Giulia Steingruber; Claudio Capelli	Germany; Kim Bui; Marcel Nguyen
2013	Romania; Larisa Iordache; Andrei Muntean	Germany; Elisabeth Seitz; Fabian Hambüchen	Switzerland; Giulia Steingruber; Claudio Capelli
2014	Russia; Daria Spiridonova; Nikita Ignatyev	Ukraine; Angelina Kysla; Oleg Verniaiev	Germany; Elisabeth Seitz; Fabian Hambüchen
2015	Ukraine; Angelina Kysla; Oleg Verniaiev	Romania; Larisa Iordache; Marius Berbecar	Germany; Pauline Schäfer; Andreas Bretschneider
2016	Ukraine; Angelina Kysla; Oleg Verniaiev	Germany; Kim Bui; Marcel Nguyen	Russia; Angelina Melnikova; Nikita Ignatyev
2017	Switzerland; Giulia Steingruber; Pablo Brägger	Japan; Hitomi Hatakeda; Wataru Tanigawa	Switzerland; Ilaria Käslin; Oliver Hegi
2018	Germany; Elisabeth Seitz; Marcel Nguyen	Russia; Angelina Melnikova; Nikita Nagornyy	(Brazil) (Canada) Pan-America; Jade Barbosa; Cory Paterson
2019	United States; Jade Carey; Allan Bower	Ukraine; Diana Varinska; Oleg Verniaiev	Switzerland; Giulia Steingruber; Oliver Hegi
2020	Not held		
2021	Russia; Angelina Melnikova; Nikita Nagornyy	Ukraine; Yelyzaveta Hubareva; Illia Kovtun	Italy; Alice D'Amato; Stefano Patron
2022	United States; Addison Fatta; Yul Moldauer	Italy; Martina Maggio; Nicola Bartolini	Turkey; Bilge Tarhan; Adem Asil
2023	United States; Jade Carey; Yul Moldauer	Japan; Chiaki Hatakeda; Kazuma Kaya	Brazil; Júlia Soares; Patrick Sampaio
2024	France; Morgane Osyssek; Léo Saladino	Algeria / Switzerland; Kaylia Nemour; Christian Baumann	Germany / Italy; Karina Schönmaier; Mario Macchiati
2026	France; Lorette Charpy; Alizée Letrange; Léo Saladino; Anthony Mansard	Germany; Karina Schönmaier; Charleen Pach; Timo Eder; Milan Hosseini	Switzerland; Lena Bickel; Anastassia Pascu; Florian Langenegger; Noe Seifert
