= Elisabeth Seitz =

German artistic gymnast

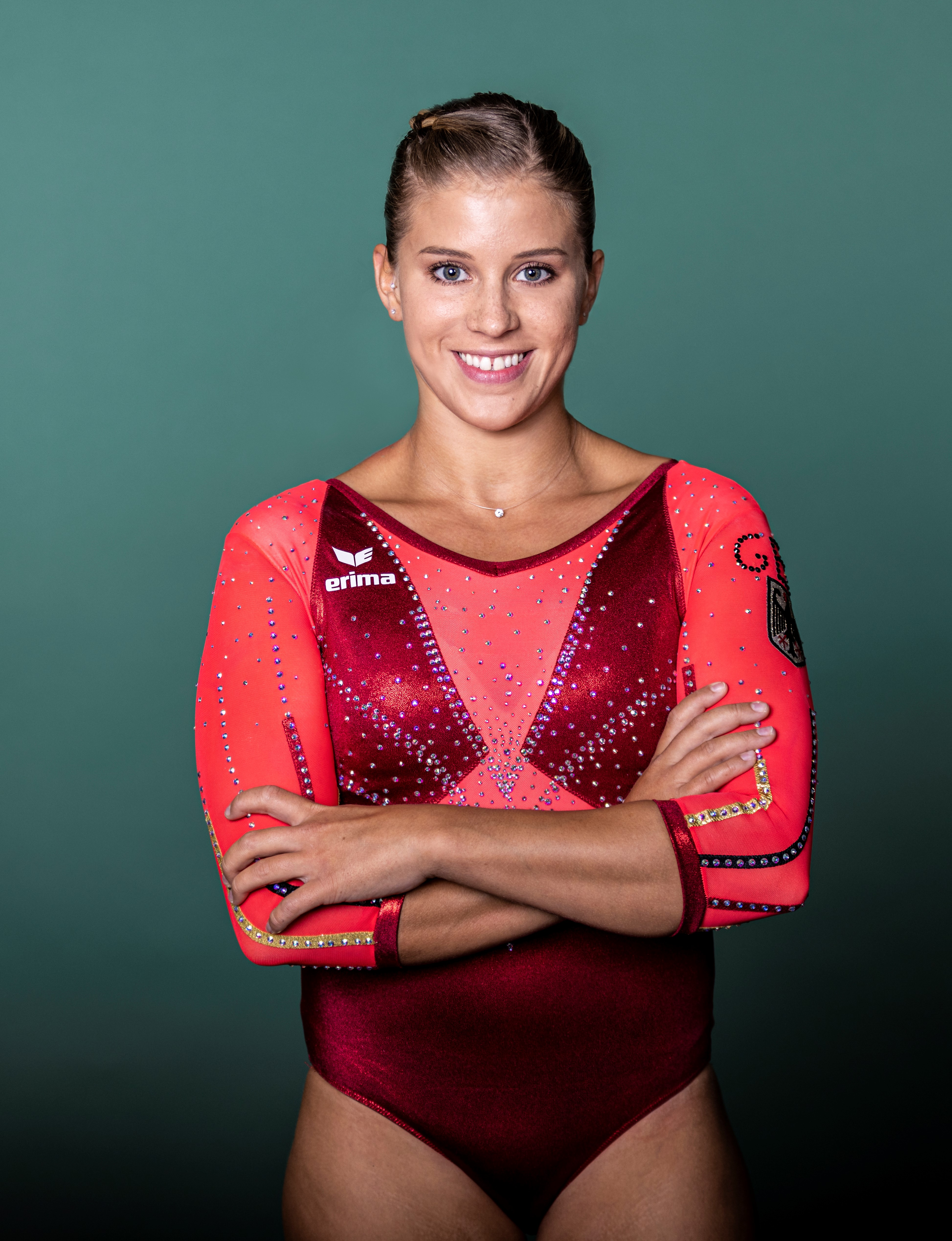
- Seitz in 2021

Personal information
- Full name: Elisabeth Seitz
- Born: 4 November 1993 (age 32) Heidelberg, Germany
- Height: 1.62 m (5 ft 4 in)

Gymnastics career
- Discipline: Women's artistic gymnastics
- Country represented: Germany; (2010–2025)
- Club: MTV Stuttgart
- Eponymous skills: Seitz (E): full-twisting toe-on Shaposhnikova (uneven bars)
- Retired: May 29, 2025
Medal record
Women's artistic gymnastics
Representing Germany
World Championships
| Bronze medal – third place | 2018 Doha | Uneven Bars |
European Games
| Silver medal – second place | 2015 Baku | Team |
European Championships
| Gold medal – first place | 2022 Munich | Uneven Bars |
| Silver medal – second place | 2011 Berlin | All-Around |
| Bronze medal – third place | 2017 Cluj-Napoca | Uneven Bars |
| Bronze medal – third place | 2022 Munich | Team |
| Bronze medal – third place | 2023 Antalya | Uneven Bars |
FIG World Cup
| Event | 1st | 2nd | 3rd |
|---|---|---|---|
| All-Around World Cup | 0 | 4 | 1 |
| Apparatus World Cup | 1 | 0 | 0 |
| World Challenge Cup | 1 | 1 | 1 |
| Total | 2 | 5 | 2 |

Elisabeth Seitz (born 4 November 1993) is a German retired artistic gymnast. She is the 2022 European champion and the 2018 World bronze medalist on the uneven bars. She is one of the only female gymnasts in history to compete the Def (full-twisting Gienger) release, and her eponymous skill, a full-twisting Maloney. Seitz has also had success in the individual all-around event, where she is the 2011 European silver medalist and an eight-time German national champion (2010–13, 2015, 2017–18, 2021). She is a three-time Olympian, representing Germany at the 2012 Summer Olympics in London, the 2016 Summer Olympics in Rio de Janeiro, where she led her team to a sixth-place finish and placed fourth in the uneven bars final, and the 2020 Summer Olympics in Tokyo. In 2022, she was part of the first German team to ever win a European team medal.

== Career ==
=== 2010 ===
Seitz competed at the 2010 World Artistic Gymnastics Championships, alongside Oksana Chusovitina, Lisa Katharina Hill, Joeline Mobius, Pia Tolle, and Giulia Hindermann. The team placed 11th in the qualifications, meaning they didn't advance to the team final. Seitz, however, qualified to the individual all-around final in 15th place, and to the uneven bars final in 6th place. She finished 12th in the all-around, with a score of 56.157 and came in 8th place in the uneven bars final, after falling on her full-twisting Gienger, called a Def, and her toe-on to piked tkatchev, called a Church, and score a 10.466.

=== 2011 ===
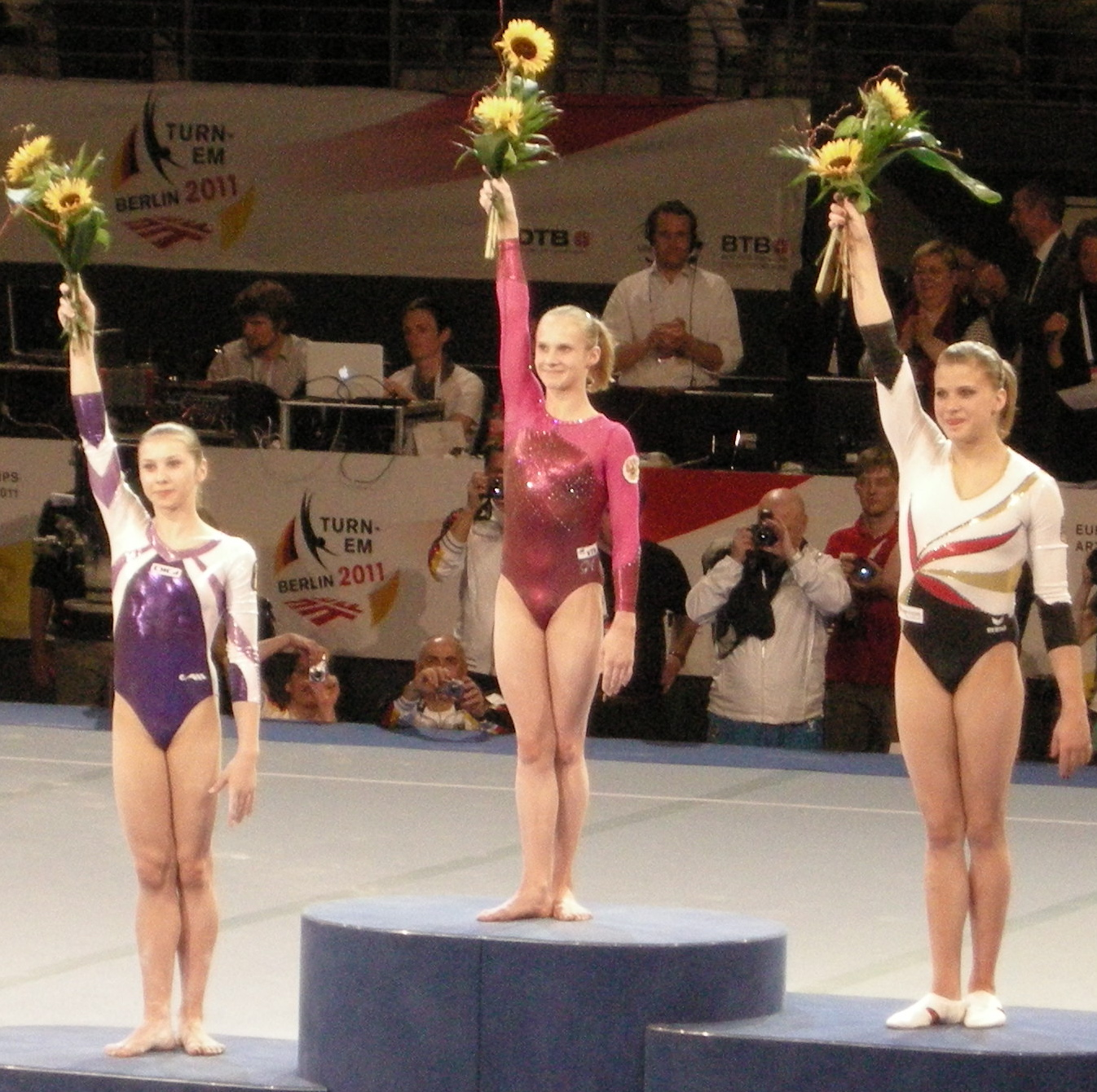
Elisabeth Seitz (right) on the podium at the 2011 European Championships with Amelia Racea (left) and Anna Dementyeva (center)

At the 2011 European Championships, Seitz finished second in the all-around behind Anna Dementyeva with a score of 56.700. She finished 5th in the vault final with a score of 14.187. She finished 5th in the uneven bars final with a score of 14.175.

At the 2011 Switzerland-Germany-Romania Friendly, Seitz contributed scores on vault, bars, and beam towards Germany's second-place finish.

At the 2011 World Championships, Seitz contributed scores on all four apparatus towards Germany's sixth-place finish in the team final. In the individual all-around she finished eleventh with a score of 55.823.

=== 2012 ===
==== 2012 Olympics ====
Germany finished ninth in the team qualification round, so they did not qualify into the final. They were only 0.365 behind Canada. However, Seitz qualified twelfth into the all-around final, and eighth into the uneven bars final. In the individual all-around final, Seitz finished 10th with a score of 57.365. In the uneven bars final, Seitz finished in sixth with a score of 15.266.

In December 2012 she competed at the 2012 World Cup event in Stuttgart and placed second with a total score of 55.566. A week later she competed in Glasgow and again took silver, this time with a score of 54.799.

=== 2013–2014 ===
After the Olympic season, she competed at the 2013 American Cup and the 2013 World Championships, even though she was not fully prepared due to her studies. She continued competing through the 2014 season. Her World Championship chances were questioned due to injuries, but she made the team. However, she competed only on bars where she had a fall. She later competed at the 2014 Arthur Gander Memorial, finally putting together solid routines and snatched the bronze, behind the silver medalist Larisa Iordache and the gold medalist Daria Spiridonova. She won another bronze along with Fabian Hambüchen at the Swiss Cup behind the Russian and Ukrainian teams.

=== 2015 ===
Seitz competed at the 2015 São Paulo World Cup in May where she won bronze on uneven bars behind Shang Chunsong of China and compatriot Sophie Scheder and silver on floor exercise behind Flávia Saraiva of Brazil. Later that month she competed at the Flanders International Team Challenge in Ghent where she helped Germany win gold in the team final and individually she placed thirteenth in the all-around.

In June Seitz was selected to compete at the 2015 European Games with Sophie Scheder and Leah Griesser. The team won a silver medal behind Russia.

In September Seitz competed at the German National Championships where she won gold in the all-around, finishing ahead of Pauline Schäfer and Sophie Scheder. Additionally she won gold on uneven bars, silver on balance beam behind Schäfer, and placed fourth on floor exercise. In October she placed first in the all-around at the German World Trials.

In October Seitz competed at the World Championships alongside Griesser, Lisa Katharina Hill, Schäfer, Scheder, and Pauline Tratz. During qualifications Seitz helped Germany place twelfth and they did not qualify to the team final. Individually Seitz finished twenty-sixth in the all-around qualifications and advanced to the final. There she scored 55.765 which resulted in a tenth-place finish. Seitz ended the season competing at the Swiss Cup, a mixed gender event. She was partnered with Sebastian Krimmer and they finished ninth.

=== 2016 ===
Seitz competed at the Glasgow World Cup in March where she finished second behind MyKayla Skinner of the United States. The following week she competed at the DTB Team Challenge where Germany placed second behind Russia.

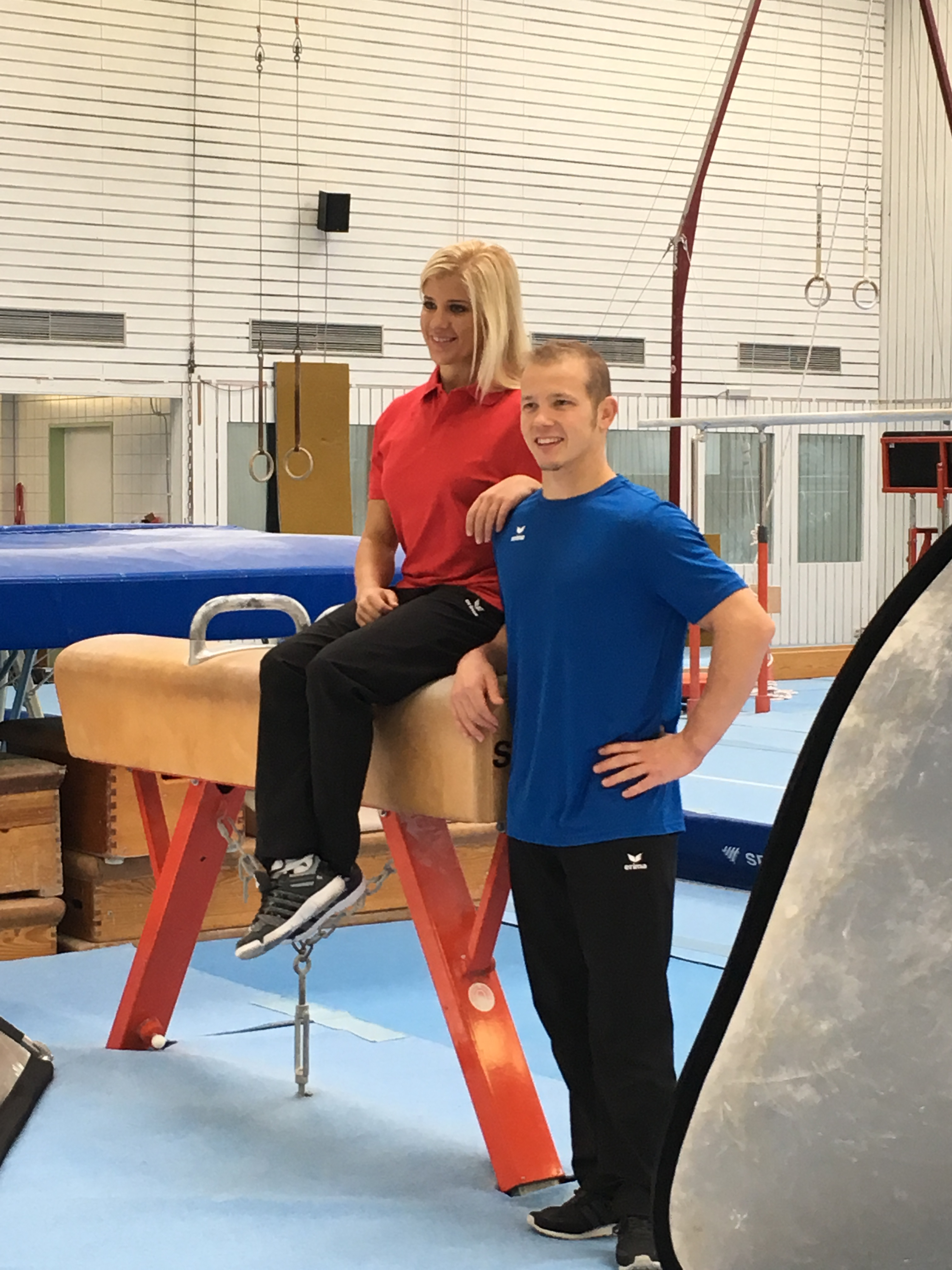
Seitz and Fabian Hambüchen in 2016

In April Seitz competed at the 2016 Test Event, helping her team to finish 2nd behind host team Brazil, qualifying a full team to the Olympic Games. Individually, she won the test event titles on bars ahead of her teammate Sophie Scheder. In June she competed at the German National Championships where she placed second behind Scheder. In July she competed at the Olympic Team Trials where she once again placed second behind Scheder. Seitz was selected as one of the representatives of the German national team in 2016 Summer Olympics together with Kim Bui, Tabea Alt, Pauline Schäfer and Scheder.

At the 2016 Summer Olympics the German team pulled off a surprise top 8 finish to secure a spot in the team final, after Italy suffered three falls on beam and Canada counted falls on bars and beam. Individually, Seitz qualified to both the uneven bars and individual all around finals. In the team final, Seitz competed on bars, beam and floor to help her team to a sixth-place finish. In the all around final, she finished in seventeenth place. In the uneven bars final she placed fourth behind 2012 Olympic Uneven Bars Champion Aliya Mustafina of Russia, 2015 World Uneven Bars Co-Champion Madison Kocian of the United States, and compatriot Scheder.

=== 2017 ===
In March Seitz competed at the DTB Pokal Team Challenge where she helped Germany place second behind Russia. In April Seitz competed at the 2017 European Championships in Cluj-Napoca. She qualified to the uneven bars in joint first with Nina Derwael of Belgium. During the final, however, she missed a connection and finished in third place, tied with Ellie Downie of Great Britain and finishing behind Derwael and Elena Eremina of Russia.

In June Seitz competed at the German National Championships where she won gold in the all-around, on uneven bars, and on balance beam.

In October Seitz competed at the World Championships where she qualified to the all-around and uneven bars finals. She placed ninth in the all-around and fifth on uneven bars. In November she competed at the Swiss Cup, a mixed gender competition where she was partnered with Marcel Nguyen. They finished fifth. Later that month she competed at the Cottbus World Cup where she won gold on uneven bars.

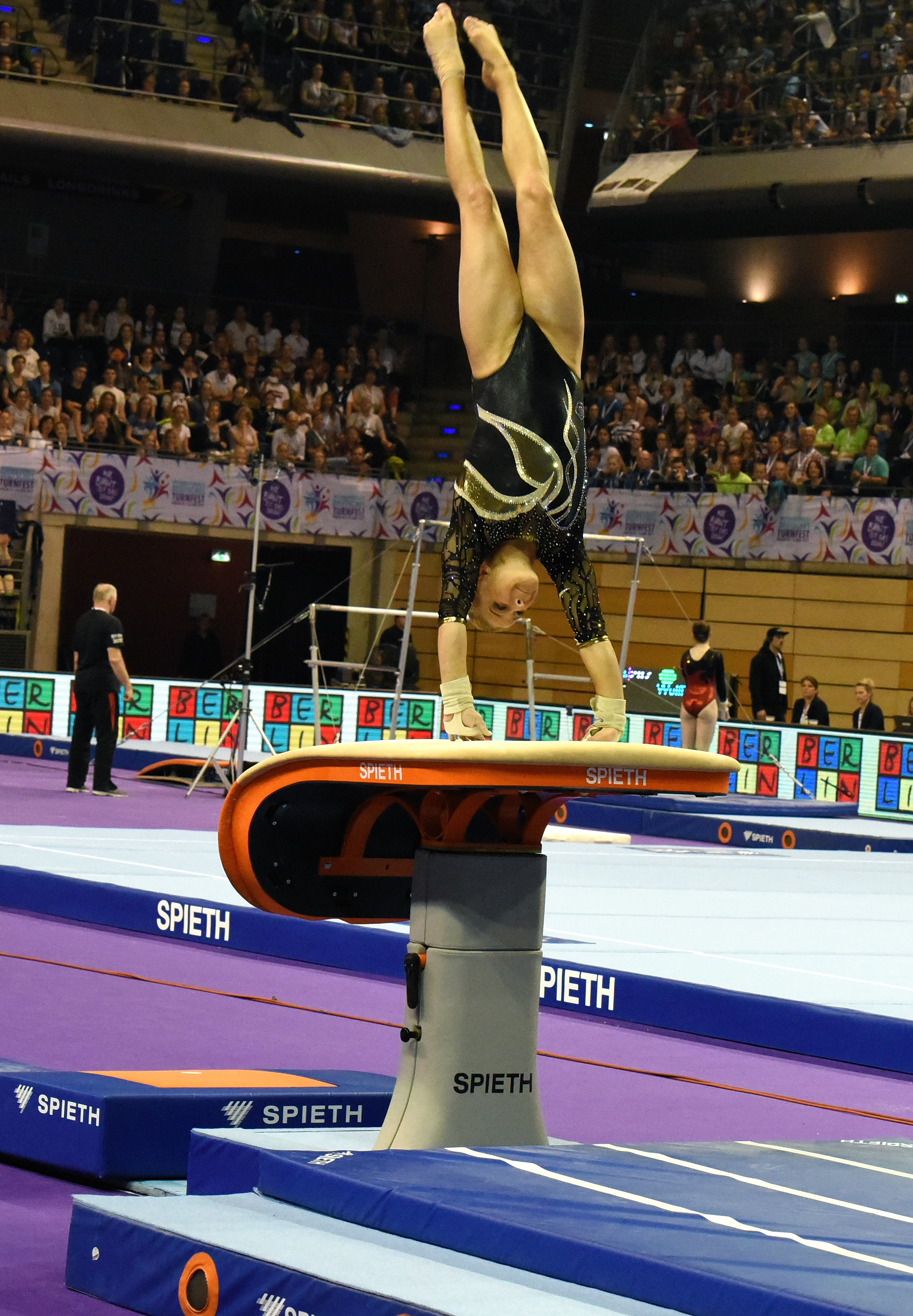
Vault

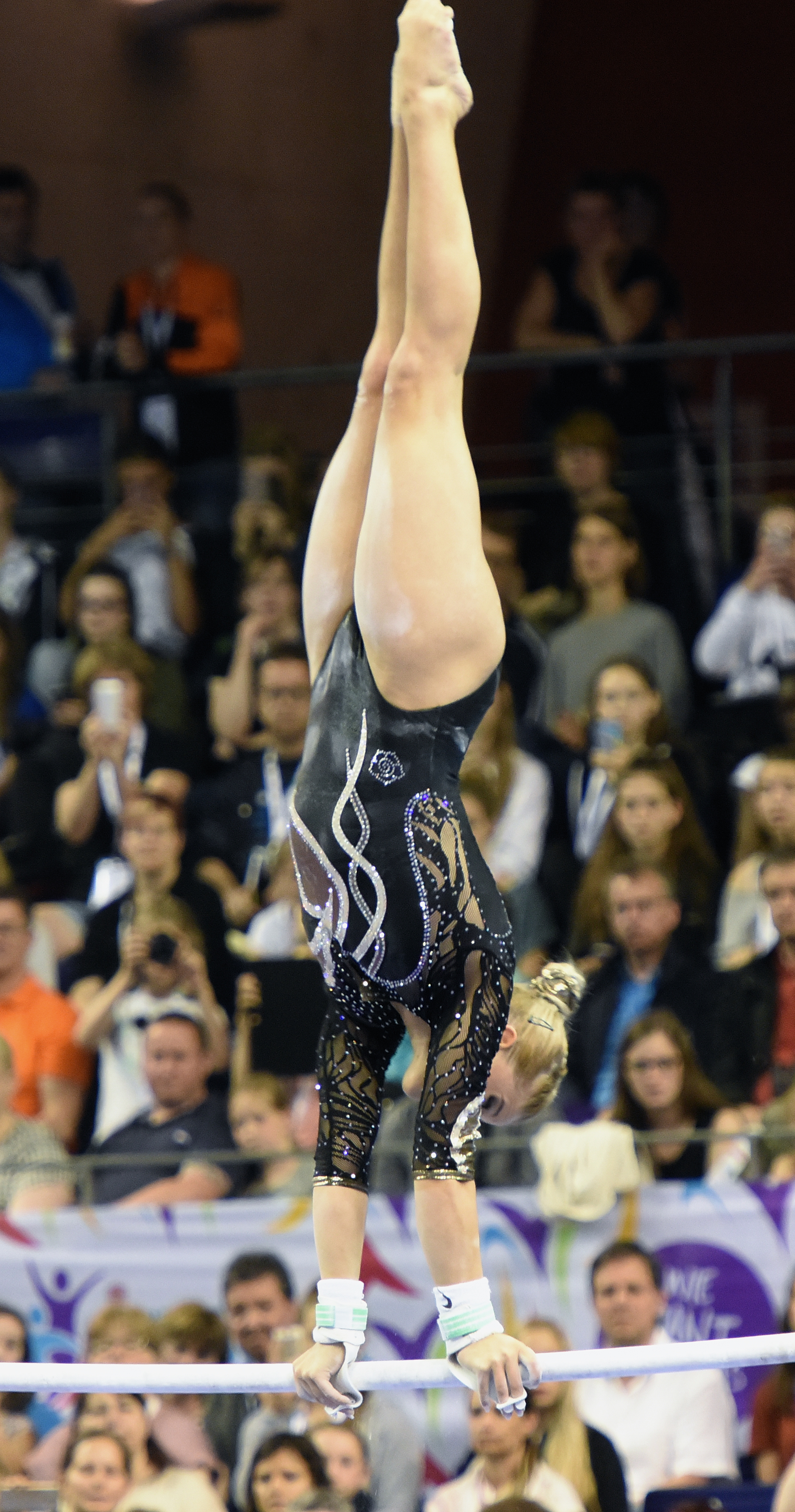
Uneven Bars

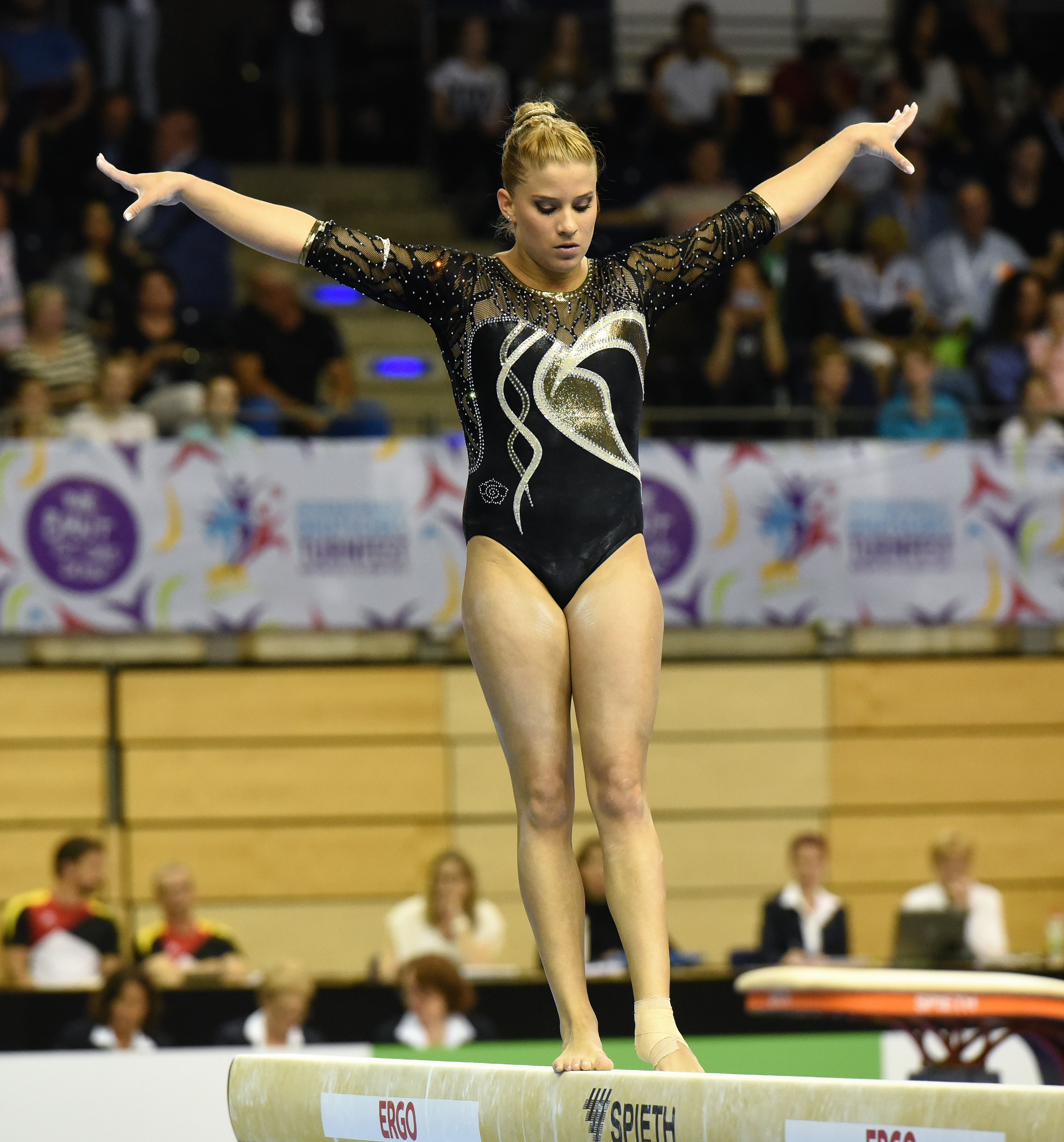
Balance Beam

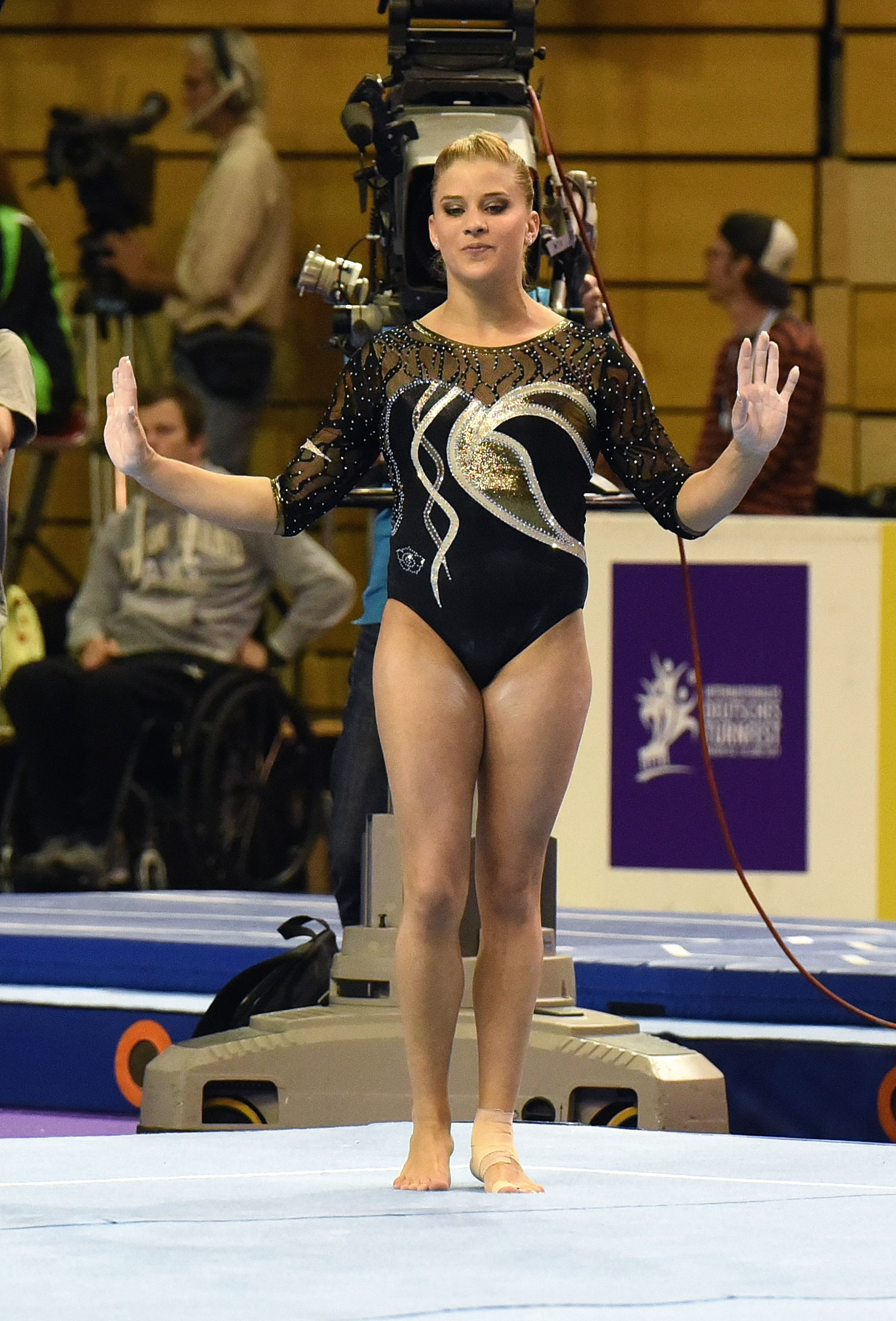
Floor Exercise

Seitz at the 2017 International German Gymnastics Festival

=== 2018 ===
In March Seitz competed at the American Cup where she placed sixth but tied for the highest uneven bars score alongside American Morgan Hurd. Later that month she competed at the Stuttgart World Cup where she placed second behind Zhang Jin of China. She next competed at the Tokyo World Cup where she placed fifth.

In September Seitz competed at the German Championships where she won gold in the all-around and on uneven bars and she won silver on floor exercise behind Leah Griesser.

At the 2018 World Championships Seitz helped Germany qualify to the team final and individually she qualified to the all-around and uneven bars finals. During the team final she contributed scores on vault, uneven bars, and floor exercise towards Germany's eighth-place finish. During the all-around final Seitz placed twenty-first. During the uneven bars final Seitz won the bronze medal behind Nina Derwael of Belgium and Simone Biles of the United States. Afterwards Seitz competed at the Swiss Cup, a unique mixed pairs event where she was partnered with Marcel Nguyen and together they won gold.

=== 2019 ===
In March Seitz competed at the Stuttgart World Cup where she won bronze behind Simone Biles of the United States and Ana Padurariu of Canada. In August she competed at the German Championships where she placed fifth in the all-around, first on uneven bars, and second on floor exercise behind Kim Bui.

In September Seitz was named to the team to compete at the 2019 World Championships in Stuttgart alongside Kim Bui, Emelie Petz, Sarah Voss, and Sophie Scheder. Later that month she competed at a friendly in Worms, Germany where she finished first in the all-around and helped Germany finish first in the team competition.

At the World Championships Seitz competed all four events during qualification and helped Germany place ninth as a team. Although they did not qualify to the team final, they qualified a team to the 2020 Olympic Games in Tokyo. Individually Seitz qualified to the all-around and uneven bars finals. During the all-around final Seitz finished in sixth place and became the highest placing German female gymnast at a World Championships all-around final since Germany's reunification. Additionally she received the second highest uneven bars score of the day behind reigning World Uneven Bar Champion Nina Derwael of Belgium. During the uneven bars final Seitz fell off the apparatus and finished in eighth place.

In November Seitz competed at the Swiss Cup alongside Andy Toba. Together they finished fourth behind the United States (Jade Carey and Allan Bower), Ukraine (Diana Varinska and Oleg Verniaiev), and Switzerland (Giulia Steingruber and Oliver Hegi).

=== 2020 ===
In late January it was announced that Seitz would compete at the Stuttgart World Cup taking place in March. In early February it was announced that she would also compete at the Birmingham World Cup taking place in late March. The Stuttgart World Cup was later canceled due to the COVID-19 pandemic in Germany. Additionally the Birmingham World Cup was canceled due to the COVID-19 pandemic in the United Kingdom.

=== 2021 ===
In April Seitz competed at the European Championships where she qualified to the all-around and uneven bars finals. During the all-around final, in which she placed fifth, Seitz and compatriot Kim Bui wore unitards opposed to the standard leotard that is common in women's artistic gymnastics. While unitards are usually worn for religious reasons, the German gymnasts opted to wear them as a statement "against sexualization in gymnastics". During the uneven bars final Seitz fell off the apparatus and placed seventh.

On June 13 Seitz was selected to represent Germany at the 2020 Summer Olympics alongside Sarah Voss, Kim Bui, and Pauline Schäfer, marking her third Olympic appearance. In qualifications at the Olympic Games Germany finished ninth as a team and did not advance to the finals. However Seitz advanced to both the all-around and uneven bars finals.

=== 2022 ===
In June, Seitz competed at the German Championships, where she took the silver medal in the uneven bars final behind Kim Bui.

In August, Seitz competed at the European Championships in Munich, where she helped Germany qualify to the team final in fourth place. Individually, she also qualified to the uneven bars final in fifth place. In the team final, the German team of Seitz, Kim Bui, Pauline Schäfer, Sarah Voss and Emma Malewski won the bronze medal behind Italy and Great Britain — Germany's first team medal in European Championship history. In the uneven bars final, Seitz won the gold medal ahead of Alice D'Amato and Lorette Charpy with a score of 14.433.

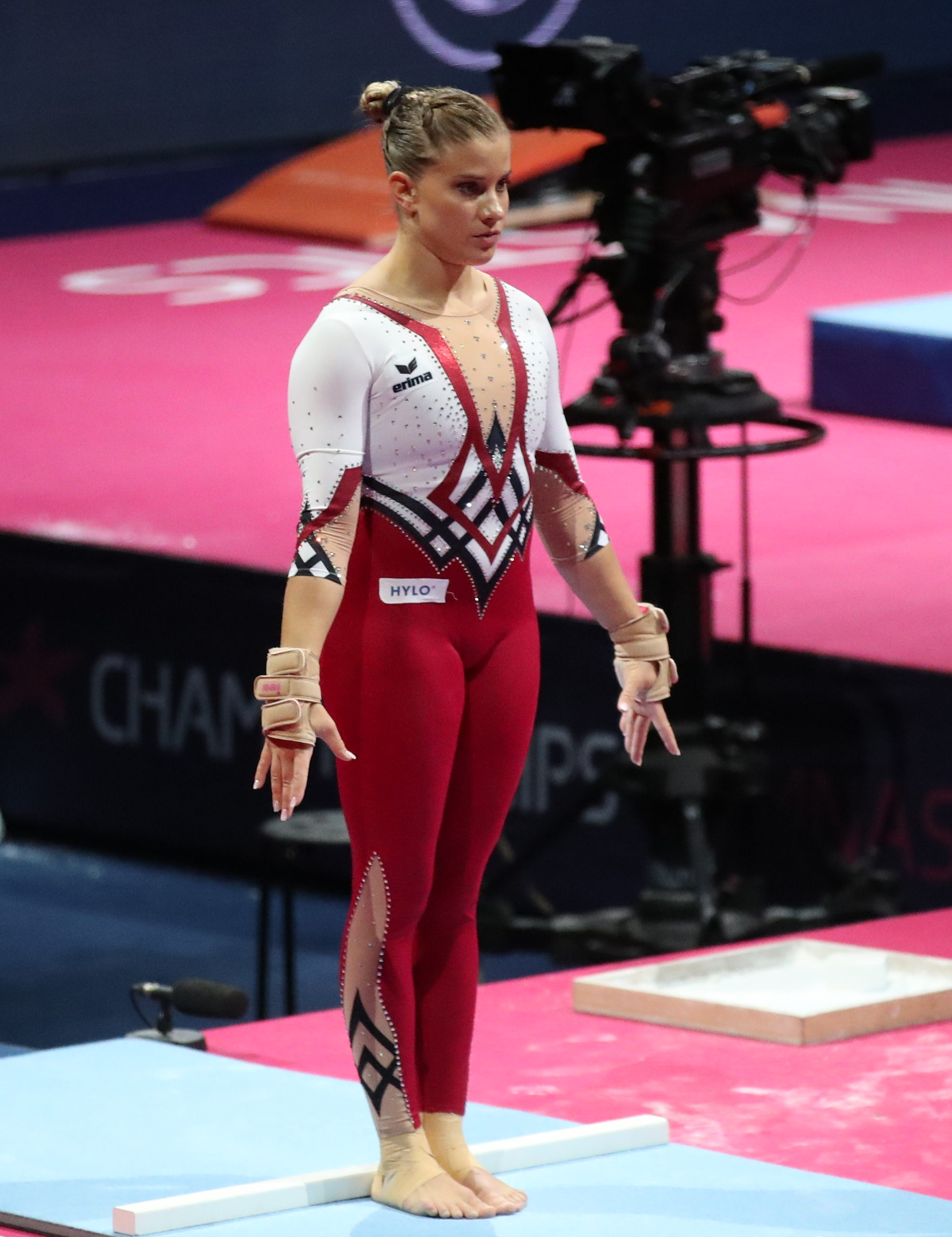
Qualifications

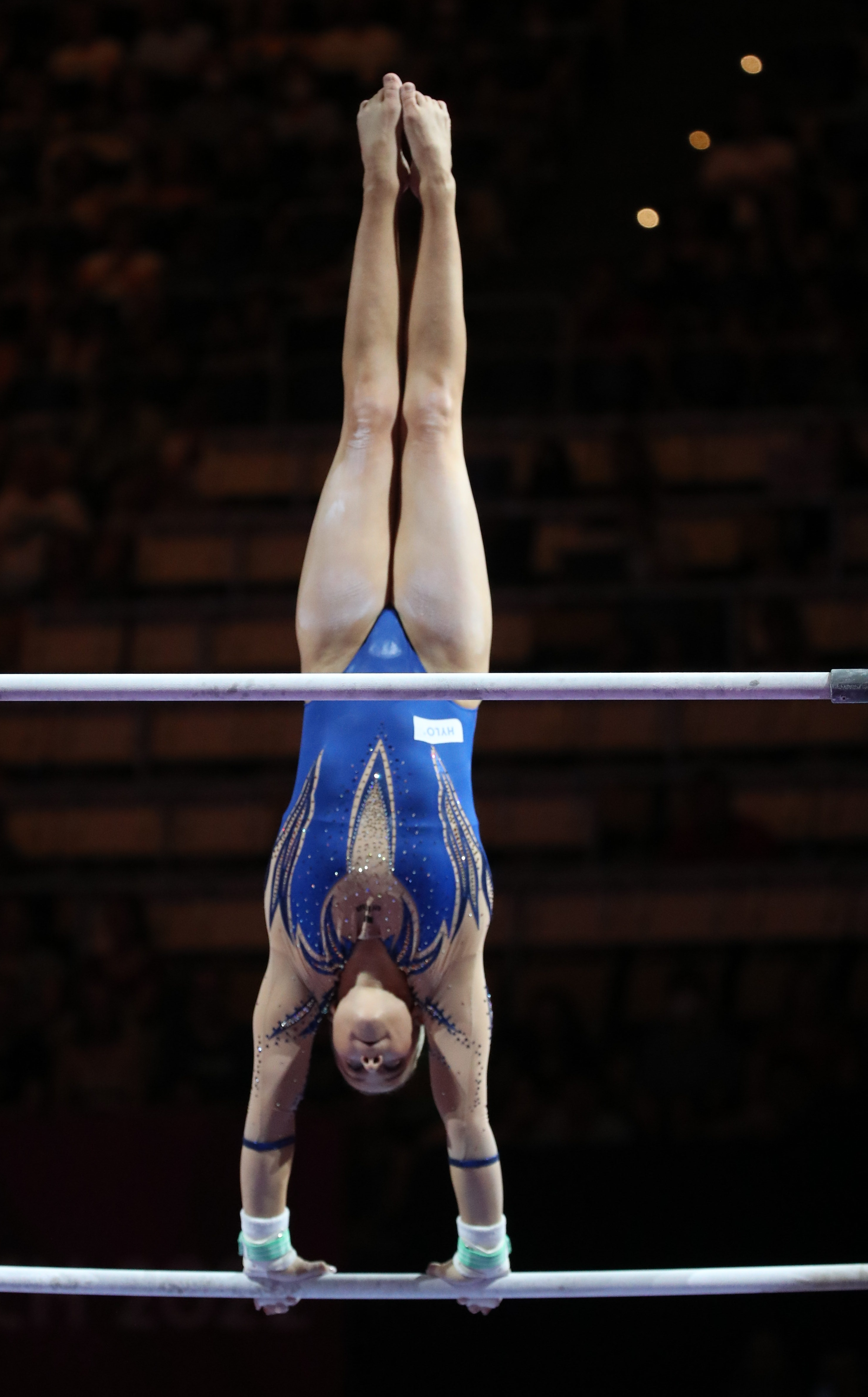
Uneven bars final

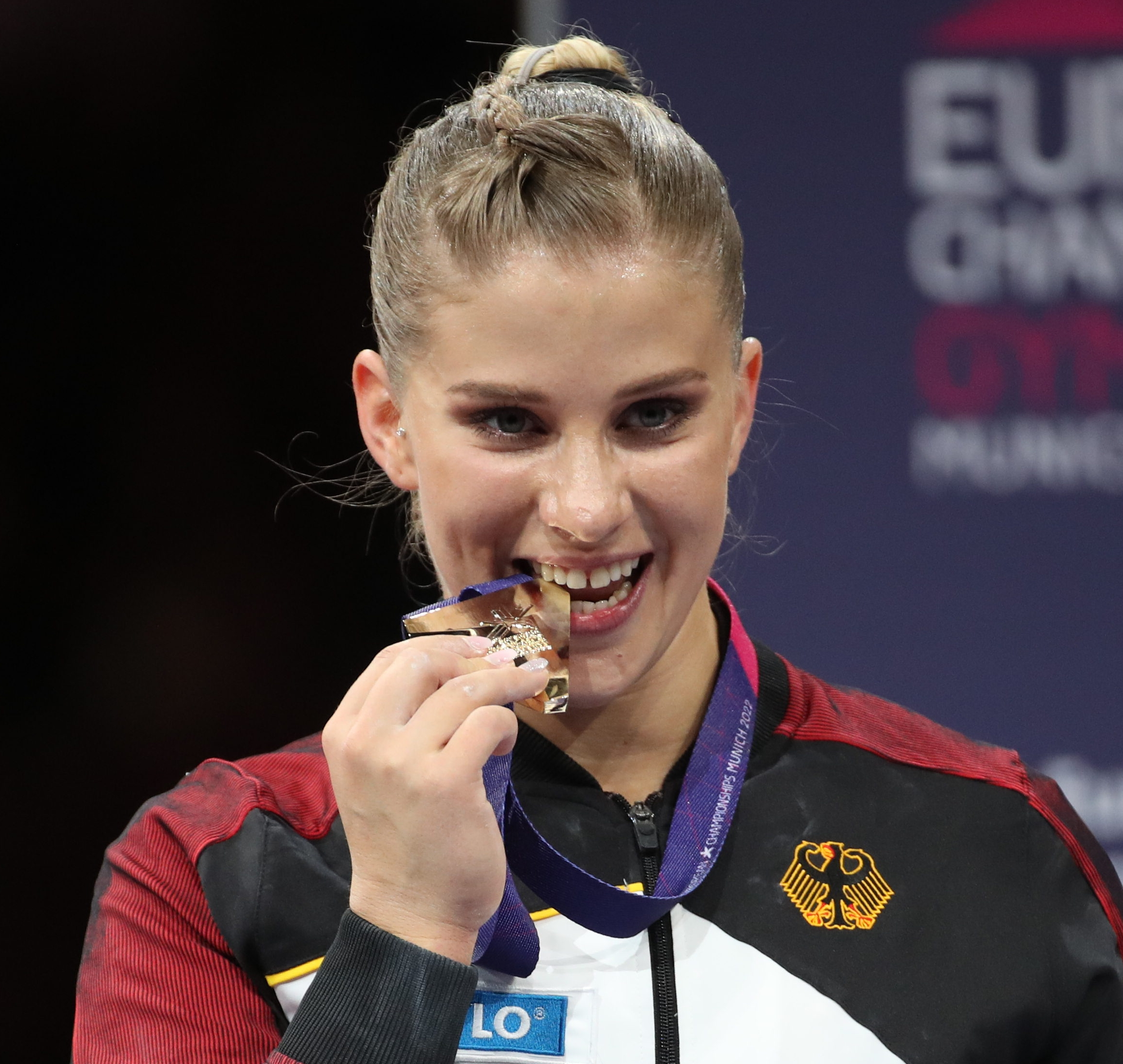
With uneven bars gold medal

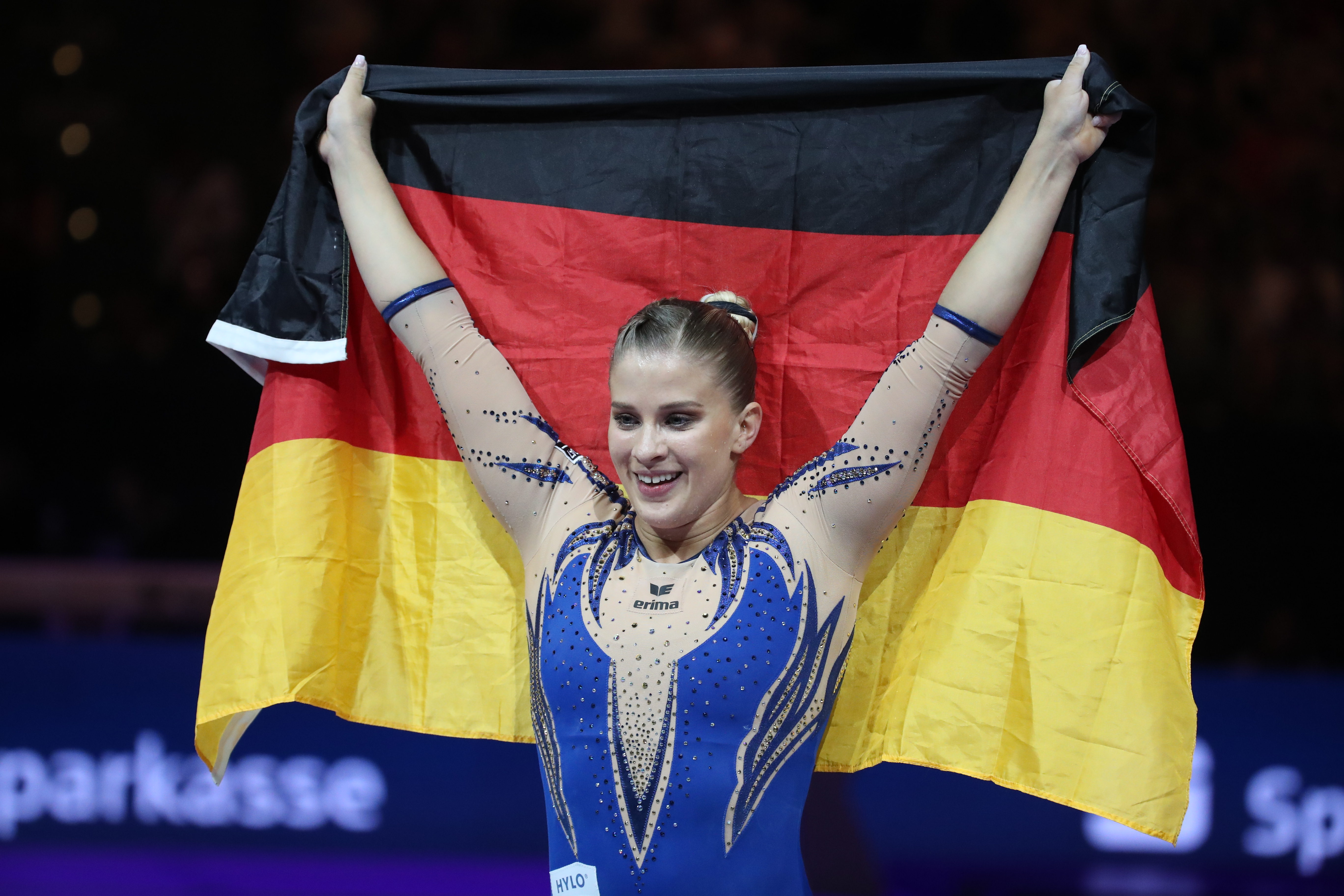
With German flag

Seitz at the 2022 European Championships

=== 2023 ===
Seitz competed at the DTB Pokal Mixed Cup, where she helped the German team take the silver medal behind Japan. She next competed at the European Championships, where she took the bronze medal in the uneven bars final behind Alice D'Amato and Becky Downie. At the German Championships, she won gold in the all-around and on uneven bars as well as bronze on floor exercise. In September, it was announced that Seitz had suffered an Achilles tendon rupture and would miss the World Championships.

=== 2024–2025 ===
Seitz returned to competition in 2024 in hopes of earning Germany's singular non-nominative Olympic berth. In June she competed at the 2024 German national championships where she only competed on the uneven bars; she won the national title on the event. Seitz next competed at the final Olympic qualification event where she finished second on uneven bars behind Helen Kevric. Due to her performance in the all-around and besting Seitz on her single event, Kevric was awarded the Olympic berth and Seitz was named as the alternate.

Seitz had initially intended to compete at the 2025 European Championships in Leipzig but had to withdraw due to a shoulder injury. She announced her retirement from the sport on 29 May.

== Eponymous skill ==
Seitz has one eponymous skill listed in the Code of Points.

| Apparatus | Name | Description | Difficulty (Note: Valid for the 2025–2028 Code of Points) | When Added to the Code of Points |
|---|---|---|---|---|
| Uneven bars | Seitz | Pike sole circle (toe-on) backward through handstand on low bar with full-twist in flight to high bar | E (0.5) | 2011 World Championships |

== Competitive history ==
Competitive history of Elisabeth Seitz
| Year | Event | Team | AA | VT | UB | BB | FX |
|---|---|---|---|---|---|---|---|
| 2009 | German Championships | | 2nd place, silver medalist(s) | | | | |
| 2010 | SUI-GER-ROU Friendly | 2nd place, silver medalist(s) | 6 | | | | |
| 2011 | SUI-GER-ROU Friendly | 2nd place, silver medalist(s) | | | | | |
| 2011 | European Championships | | 2nd place, silver medalist(s) | | | | |
| 2011 | German Championships | | 1st place, gold medalist(s) | 2nd place, silver medalist(s) | 1st place, gold medalist(s) | 5 | 1st place, gold medalist(s) |
| 2011 | World Championships | 6 | 11 | | | | |
| 2012 | Cottbus World Cup | | | | 1st place, gold medalist(s) | | |
| 2012 | GER-GBR-ROU Friendly | 2nd place, silver medalist(s) | 5 | | | | |
| 2012 | German Championships | | 1st place, gold medalist(s) | | 1st place, gold medalist(s) | 4 | 1st place, gold medalist(s) |
| 2012 | Olympic Games | | 10 | | 6 | | |
| 2012 | Swiss Cup | 1st place, gold medalist(s) | | | | | |
| 2012 | Stuttgart World Cup | | 2nd place, silver medalist(s) | | | | |
| 2012 | Glasgow World Cup | | 2nd place, silver medalist(s) | | | | |
| 2013 | American Cup | | 4 | | | | |
| 2013 | World Championships | | 15 | | | | |
| 2014 | Munich Friendly | | 3rd place, bronze medalist(s) | | | | |
| 2014 | Länderkampf Kunstturnen | 1st place, gold medalist(s) | | | | | |
| 2015 | São Paulo World Cup | | | | 3rd place, bronze medalist(s) | | 2nd place, silver medalist(s) |
| 2015 | Flanders Team Challenge | 1st place, gold medalist(s) | 13 | | | | |
| 2015 | European Games | 2nd place, silver medalist(s) | | | | | |
| 2015 | German Championships | | 1st place, gold medalist(s) | | 1st place, gold medalist(s) | 2nd place, silver medalist(s) | 4 |
| 2015 | World Championship Trials | | 1st place, gold medalist(s) | | | | |
| 2015 | Länderkampf Kunstturnen | 2nd place, silver medalist(s) | 4 | | | | |
| 2015 | World Championships | | 10 | | | | |
| 2015 | Swiss Cup | 9 | | | | | |
| 2016 | German National Team Cup | | 3rd place, bronze medalist(s) | | | | |
| 2016 | Glasgow World Cup | | 2nd place, silver medalist(s) | | | | |
| 2016 | DTB Team Challenge | 2nd place, silver medalist(s) | 4 | | | | |
| 2016 | Olympic Test Event | 2nd place, silver medalist(s) | | | 1st place, gold medalist(s) | | |
| 2016 | German Championships | | 2nd place, silver medalist(s) | | 1st place, gold medalist(s) | 3rd place, bronze medalist(s) | 4 |
| 2016 | Olympic Trials | | 2nd place, silver medalist(s) | | | | |
| 2016 | Chemnitz Friendly | | 3rd place, bronze medalist(s) | | | | |
| 2016 | Olympic Games | 6 | 17 | | 4 | | |
| 2017 | German National Team Cup | 2nd place, silver medalist(s) | | | | | |
| 2017 | DTB Pokal Team Challenge | 2nd place, silver medalist(s) | | | | | |
| 2017 | European Championships | | | | 3rd place, bronze medalist(s) | | |
| 2017 | German Championships | | 1st place, gold medalist(s) | | 1st place, gold medalist(s) | 1st place, gold medalist(s) | 6 |
| 2017 | World Championships | | 9 | | 5 | | |
| 2017 | Swiss Cup | 5 | | | | | |
| 2017 | Cottbus World Cup | | | | 1st place, gold medalist(s) | | 6 |
| 2018 | American Cup | | 6 | | | | |
| 2018 | Stuttgart World Cup | | 2nd place, silver medalist(s) | | | | |
| 2018 | Tokyo World Cup | | 5 | | | | |
| 2018 | German Worlds Trial | | 5 | | | | |
| 2018 | German Championships | | 1st place, gold medalist(s) | | 1st place, gold medalist(s) | | 2nd place, silver medalist(s) |
| 2018 | Rüsselsheim Friendly | 1st place, gold medalist(s) | 6 | | | | |
| 2018 | World Championships | 8 | 21 | | 3rd place, bronze medalist(s) | | |
| 2018 | Swiss Cup | 1st place, gold medalist(s) | | | | | |
| 2019 | Stuttgart World Cup | | 3rd place, bronze medalist(s) | | | | |
| 2019 | German Championships | | 5 | | 1st place, gold medalist(s) | | 2nd place, silver medalist(s) |
| 2019 | German World Trials | | 3rd place, bronze medalist(s) | | | | |
| 2019 | World Championships | R1 | 6 | | 8 | | |
| 2019 | Swiss Cup | 4 | | | | | |
2021
| 2021 | European Championships | | 5 | | 7 | | |
| 2021 | German Championships | | 1st place, gold medalist(s) | | 2nd place, silver medalist(s) | | |
| 2021 | Olympic Games | R1 | 9 | | 5 | | |
| 2022 | German Championships | | | | 2nd place, silver medalist(s) | | |
| 2022 | European Championships | 3rd place, bronze medalist(s) | | | 1st place, gold medalist(s) | | |
| 2022 | World Championships | R4 | | | 4 | | |
| 2023 | DTB Pokal Mixed Cup | 2nd place, silver medalist(s) | | | | | |
| 2023 | European Championships | 9 | | | 3rd place, bronze medalist(s) | | |
| 2023 | German Championships | | 1st place, gold medalist(s) | | 1st place, gold medalist(s) | 5 | 3rd place, bronze medalist(s) |
| 2024 | City of Jesolo Trophy | 8 | | | 3rd place, bronze medalist(s) | | |
| 2024 | German Championships | | | | 1st place, gold medalist(s) | | |

== Floor music ==
| Year | Music Title |
|---|---|
| 2010 | Stereo Love by Edward Maya |
| 2012 | Song to the Sea by DJ Antoine, James Gruntz |
