= 2018 Swiss Cup Zürich =

Artistic gymnastics competition

- Location: Zürich, Switzerland
- Date: November 18, 2018

Medalists
gold medal	(Germany) Elisabeth Seitz & Marcel Nguyen
silver medal	(Russia) Angelina Melnikova & Nikita Nagornyy
bronze medal	(Brazil) Jade Barbosa & (Canada) Cory Paterson

The 2018 Swiss Cup Zürich took place on November 18 in Zürich, Switzerland. It was the 31st iteration of the event.

== Participants ==
Team	WAG	MAG
Brazil	Flávia Saraiva	Arthur Mariano
France	Mélanie de Jesus dos Santos	Julien Gobaux
Germany	Elisabeth Seitz	Marcel Nguyen
(Uzbekistan) (Romania) Legends	Oksana Chusovitina	Marian Drăgulescu
Netherlands	Eythora Thorsdottir	Bart Deurloo
(Brazil) (Canada) Pan-America	Jade Barbosa	Cory Paterson
Russia	Angelina Melnikova	Nikita Nagornyy
Switzerland 1	Ilaria Käslin	Oliver Hegi
Switzerland 2	Leonie Meier	Pablo Brägger
Ukraine	Diana Varinska	Oleg Verniaiev

== Results ==
=== Prelims ===
Rank	Name	Round 1	Round 2	Semifinal	Total
1	Russia				84.100
1	Angelina Melnikova	13.350	13.800	13.150	40.300
1	Nikita Nagornyy	14.500	14.750	14.550	43.800
2	Germany				82.200
2	Elisabeth Seitz	14.700	13.000	11.500	39.200
2	Marcel Nguyen	14.000	14.400	14.600	43.000
3	(Brazil) (Canada) Pan-America				80.500
3	Jade Barbosa	13.550	14.000	12.100	39.650
3	Cory Paterson	13.850	13.800	13.200	40.850
4	Ukraine				80.050
4	Diana Varinska	13.600	12.950	11.900	38.450
4	Oleg Verniaiev	13.200	14.700	13.700	41.600
5	(Uzbekistan) (Romania) Legends				78.250
5	Oksana Chusovitina	12.000	14.125	10.500	36.625
5	Marian Drăgulescu	14.125	13.950	13.550	41.625
6	Brazil				77.725
6	Flávia Saraiva	12.200	13.850	11.700	37.750
6	Arthur Mariano	14.175	14.200	11.600	39.975
7	Switzerland 1				53.750
7	Ilaria Käslin	12.650	12.400		25.050
7	Oliver Hegi	14.200	14.500		28.700
8	Netherlands				53.350
8	Eythora Thorsdottir	13.050	12.950		26.000
8	Bart Deurloo	13.800	13.550		27.350
9	France				53.050
9	Mélanie de Jesus dos Santos	12.650	11.800		24.450
9	Julien Gobaux	14.300	14.300		28.600
10	Switzerland 2				52.350
10	Leonie Meier	12.250	11.950		24.200
10	Pablo Brägger	14.450	13.700		28.150

the team advanced to the finals

=== Finals ===
Rank	Name	Scores	Total
1st place, gold medalist(s)	Germany		29.750
1st place, gold medalist(s)	Elisabeth Seitz	14.900	29.750
1st place, gold medalist(s)	Marcel Nguyen	14.850	29.750
2nd place, silver medalist(s)	Russia		29.575
2nd place, silver medalist(s)	Angelina Melnikova	14.125	29.575
2nd place, silver medalist(s)	Nikita Nagornyy	15.450	29.575
3rd place, bronze medalist(s)	(Brazil) (Canada) Pan-America		28.075
3rd place, bronze medalist(s)	Jade Barbosa	14.025	28.075
3rd place, bronze medalist(s)	Cory Paterson	14.050	28.075
