= Sanna Veerman =

Dutch artistic gymnast

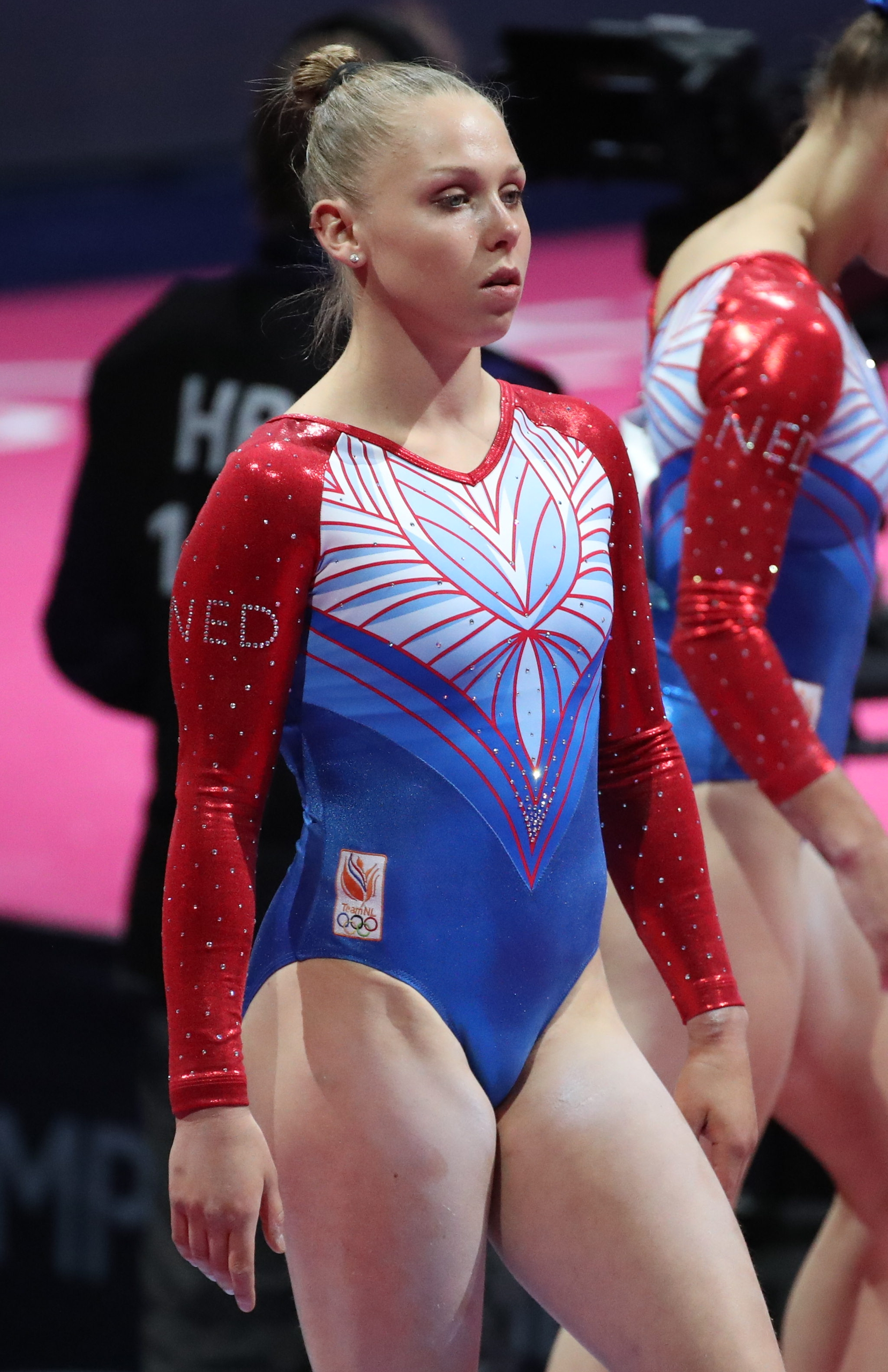
- Veerman at the 2022 European Championships

Personal information
- Born: 29 January 2002 (age 24) Edam-Volendam, Netherlands

Gymnastics career
- Discipline: Women's artistic gymnastics
- Country represented: Netherlands
- Club: Turnz Amsterdam
- Head coaches: Jeroen Jacobs; Wolther Kooistra
Medal record
Representing Netherlands
European Championships
Bronze medal – third place	2023 Antalya	Team
FIG World Cup
Event	1st	2nd	3rd
Apparatus World Cup	0	1	1
World Challenge Cup	0	0	1
Total	0	1	2

Sanna Veerman (born 29 January 2002) is a Dutch artistic gymnast. She was part of the bronze medal-winning Dutch team at the 2023 European Championships.

== Early life ==
Veerman was born on 29 January 2002 in Edam-Volendam. She started gymnastics at the age of six.

== Senior career ==
=== 2022 ===
Veerman competed at the Cottbus World Cup, where she took the silver medal in the uneven bars final behind teammate Tisha Volleman. At the European Championships in Munich, she helped the Netherlands qualify to the team final, where they finished fourth behind Italy, Great Britain, and Germany.

Veerman was named to the Dutch team for the World Championships in Liverpool. The team finished ninth during qualifications, missing out on the team final. Individually, Veerman qualified to the uneven bars final, where she finished fifth.

=== 2023 ===
Veerman began her season in March at the Baku World Cup, where she took the bronze medal in the uneven bars final behind Qiu Qiyuan of China and Giorgia Villa of Italy. She then competed at the DTB Pokal Stuttgart, where she finished second on the uneven bars behind Zoe Miller.

In April, Veerman competed at the European Championships, where she helped the Dutch team take the bronze medal behind Great Britain and Italy.

== Competitive history ==
Year	Event	Team	AA	VT	UB	BB	FX
2018	Dutch Championships		5		2nd place, silver medalist(s)		
2018	Heerenveen Friendly	2nd place, silver medalist(s)	6		6		
2018	Varsenare Friendly	2nd place, silver medalist(s)	9				
2019	American Cup		7				
2019	DTB Team Challenge	3rd place, bronze medalist(s)			2nd place, silver medalist(s)		
2019	European Championships				8		
2019	Heerenveen Friendly	2nd place, silver medalist(s)	14				
2019	2nd Heerenveen Friendly		7		1st place, gold medalist(s)		
2019	Arthur Gander Memorial		6		3rd place, bronze medalist(s)		
2019	Swiss Cup	8					
2021	1st Dutch Olympic Trials		5	3rd place, bronze medalist(s)			
2021	2nd Dutch Olympic Trials		6		3rd place, bronze medalist(s)		
2021	1st Dutch Worlds Trials		3rd place, bronze medalist(s)	3rd place, bronze medalist(s)	2nd place, silver medalist(s)	3rd place, bronze medalist(s)	
2021	1st Dutch Olympic Trials		3rd place, bronze medalist(s)	1st place, gold medalist(s)	1st place, gold medalist(s)		3rd place, bronze medalist(s)
2021	World Championships				31	41	
2021	Gymnova Cup		3rd place, bronze medalist(s)	1st place, gold medalist(s)	1st place, gold medalist(s)		3rd place, bronze medalist(s)
2022	Cottbus World Cup				2nd place, silver medalist(s)	8	
2022	DTB Pokal	5	8		6	3rd place, bronze medalist(s)	
2022	Varna World Challenge Cup				6		
2022	Dutch Championships		4		2nd place, silver medalist(s)	6	
2022	European Championships	4					
2022	Dutch Worlds Trials				3rd place, bronze medalist(s)		
2022	World Championships	9			5		
2023	Baku World Cup				3rd place, bronze medalist(s)		
2023	DTB Pokal	4			2nd place, silver medalist(s)		
2023	European Championships	3rd place, bronze medalist(s)					
2023	World Championships	7			6		
2024
2024	Olympic Games	9			R3		
2025	Osijek World Cup				4		
2025	World Championships				R1		
2026	Koper World Challenge Cup				3rd place, bronze medalist(s)		
2026	European Championships	6			4		
2026	World Championships				R2		
