= 2019 Swiss Cup Zürich =

Artistic gymnastics competition

- Location: Zürich, Switzerland
- Date: November 3, 2019

Medalists
gold medal	(United States) Jade Carey & Allan Bower
silver medal	(Ukraine) Diana Varinska & Oleg Verniaiev
bronze medal	(Switzerland) Giulia Steingruber & Oliver Hegi

The 2019 Swiss Cup Zürich took place on November 3 in Zürich, Switzerland. It was the 32nd iteration of the event.

== Participants ==
Team	WAG	MAG
Canada	Rose-Kaying Woo	René Cournoyer
France	Lorette Charpy	Loris Frasca
Germany	Elisabeth Seitz	Andreas Toba
Netherlands	Sanna Veerman	Casimir Schmidt
Russia	Aleksandra Shchekoldina	Artur Dalaloyan
South Korea	Yeo Seo-jeong	Lee Jun-ho
Switzerland 1	Giulia Steingruber	Oliver Hegi
Switzerland 2	Ilaria Käslin	Pablo Brägger
Ukraine	Diana Varinska	Oleg Verniaiev
United States	Jade Carey	Allan Bower

== Results ==
=== Prelims ===
Rank	Name	Round 1	Round 2	Total
1	United States			56.450
1	Jade Carey	14.600	13.550	28.150
1	Allan Bower	14.100	14.200	28.300
2	Switzerland 1			55.950
2	Giulia Steingruber	13.950	14.550	28.500
2	Oliver Hegi	13.300	14.150	27.450
3	Ukraine			55.800
3	Diana Varinska	14.250	11.950	26.200
3	Oleg Verniaiev	14.250	15.350	29.600
4	Germany			55.650
4	Elisabeth Seitz	14.700	13.150	27.850
4	Andreas Toba	14.250	13.600	27.800
5	France			55.275
5	Lorette Charpy	14.050	12.100	26.150
5	Loris Frasca	14.725	14.400	29.125
6	Russia			55.025
6	Aleksandra Shchekoldina	13.025	12.350	25.375
6	Artur Dalaloyan	14.250	15.400	29.650
7	South Korea			54.325
7	Yeo Seo-jeong	14.200	12.650	26.850
7	Lee Jun-ho	14.075	13.400	27.475
8	Netherlands			53.900
8	Sanna Veerman	13.350	12.750	26.100
8	Casimir Schmidt	13.850	13.950	27.800
9	Canada			26.400
9	Rose-Kaying Woo	12.600		12.600
9	René Cournoyer	13.800		13.800
10	Switzerland 2			24.850
10	Ilaria Käslin	11.150		11.150
10	Pablo Brägger	13.700		13.700

the team advanced to the semi-finals

=== Semi-finals ===
Rank	Name	Scores	Total
USA vs Germany
1	United States		27.250
1	Jade Carey	12.950	27.250
1	Allan Bower	14.300	27.250
2	Germany		26.950
2	Elisabeth Seitz	12.700	26.950
2	Andreas Toba	14.250	26.950
Switzerland vs Ukraine
1	Ukraine		27.750
1	Diana Varinska	12.700	27.750
1	Oleg Verniaiev	15.050	27.750
2	Switzerland 1		24.200
2	Giulia Steingruber	11.750	24.200
2	Oliver Hegi	12.450	24.200

the team advanced to the finals

=== Finals ===
Rank	Name	Scores	Total
Championships
1st place, gold medalist(s)	United States		29.075
1st place, gold medalist(s)	Jade Carey	14.625	29.075
1st place, gold medalist(s)	Allan Bower	14.450	29.075
2nd place, silver medalist(s)	Ukraine		27.650
2nd place, silver medalist(s)	Diana Varinska	12.350	27.650
2nd place, silver medalist(s)	Oleg Verniaiev	15.300	27.650
Third place
3rd place, bronze medalist(s)	Switzerland 1		29.250
3rd place, bronze medalist(s)	Giulia Steingruber	14.600	29.250
3rd place, bronze medalist(s)	Oliver Hegi	14.650	29.250
4	Germany		28.850
4	Elisabeth Seitz	14.900	28.850
4	Andreas Toba	13.950	28.850
