= 2023 Swiss Cup Zürich =

Artistic gymnastics competition

- Location: Zürich, Switzerland
- Date: November 5, 2023

Medalists
gold medal	(United States) Jade Carey & Yul Moldauer
silver medal	(Japan) Chiaki Hatakeda & Kazuma Kaya
bronze medal	(Brazil) Júlia Soares & Patrick Sampaio

The 2023 Swiss Cup Zürich took place on November 5 in Zürich, Switzerland. It was the 35th iteration of the event.

== Participants ==
Team	WAG	MAG
Austria	Bianca Frysak	Askhab Matiev
Brazil	Júlia Soares	Patrick Sampaio
France	Mélanie de Jesus dos Santos	Jim Zona
Germany	Pauline Schaefer-Betz	Lukas Dauser
Italy	Manila Esposito	Yumin Abbadini
Japan	Hatakeda Chiaki	Kazuma Kaya
Switzerland 1	Anny Wu	Christian Baumann
Switzerland 2	Stefanie Siegenthaler	Florian Langenegger
Turkey	Bengisu Yildiz	Adem Asil
United States	Jade Carey	Yul Moldauer

== Results ==
=== Prelims ===
Rank	Name	Round 1	Round 2	Total
1	United States			56.250
1	Jade Carey	13.750	13.050	26.800
1	Yul Moldauer	15.200	14.250	29.450
2	Italy			55.600
2	Manila Esposito	13.400	14.150	27.550
2	Yumin Abbadini	14.100	13.950	28.050
3	Japan			55.025
3	Chiaki Hatakeda	12.450	12.875	25.325
3	Kazuma Kaya	15.050	14.650	29.700
4	Brazil			54.700
4	Júlia Soares	13.600	13.100	26.700
4	Patrick Sampaio	14.000	14.000	28.000
5	France			54.350
5	Mélanie de Jesus dos Santos	13.500	14.100	27.600
5	Jim Zona	14.050	12.700	26.750
6	Turkey			53.150
6	Bengisu Yıldız	12.425	12.200	24.625
6	Adem Asil	13.950	14.575	28.525
7	Germany			52.700
7	Pauline Schäfer-Betz	12.850	13.050	25.900
7	Lukas Dauser	14.900	11.900	26.800
8	Switzerland 1			52.150
8	Anny Wu	12.750	11.200	23.950
8	Christian Baumann	15.000	13.200	28.200
9	Austria			25.950
9	Bianca Frysak	12.450		12.450
9	Askhab Matiev	13.500		13.500
10	Switzerland 2			25.650
10	Stefanie Siegenthaler	11.350		11.350
10	Florian Langenegger	14.300		14.300

the team advanced to the semi-finals

=== Semi-finals ===
Rank	Name	Scores	Total
USA vs Brazil
1	United States		27.600
1	Jade Carey	13.200	27.600
1	Yul Moldauer	14.400	27.600
2	Brazil		24.700
2	Júlia Soares	11.150	24.700
2	Patrick Sampaio	13.550	24.700
Japan vs Italy
1	Japan		27.900
1	Chiaki Hatakeda	13.150	27.900
1	Kazuma Kaya	14.750	27.900
2	Italy		27.700
2	Manila Esposito	13.400	27.700
2	Yumin Abbadini	14.300	27.700

the team advanced to the finals

=== Finals ===
Rank	Name	Scores	Total
Championships
1st place, gold medalist(s)	United States		29.050
1st place, gold medalist(s)	Jade Carey	13.700	29.050
1st place, gold medalist(s)	Yul Moldauer	15.350	29.050
2nd place, silver medalist(s)	Japan		28.325
2nd place, silver medalist(s)	Chiaki Hatakeda	13.075	28.325
2nd place, silver medalist(s)	Kazuma Kaya	15.250	28.325
Third place
3rd place, bronze medalist(s)	Brazil		27.350
3rd place, bronze medalist(s)	Júlia Soares	13.000	27.350
3rd place, bronze medalist(s)	Patrick Sampaio	14.350	27.350
4	Italy		26.350
4	Manila Esposito	13.650	26.350
4	Yumin Abbadini	12.700	26.350
