= Diana Varinska =

Ukrainian artistic gymnast

Diana Varinska Діана Варінська
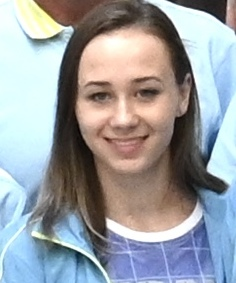
- Varinska in 2021

Personal information
- Full name: Diana Yevhenivna Varinska
- Born: 22 March 2001 (age 25) Kyiv, Ukraine
- Height: 160 cm (5 ft 3 in)

Gymnastics career
- Discipline: Women's artistic gymnastics
- Country represented: Ukraine; (2013–2022)
- Club: Specialised Children's and Youth Sports School "Ukraina"
- Gym: Koncha-Zaspa Olympic Training and Sports Center
- Head coaches: Oleg Ostapenko; Yulia Kaiukova
- Former coach: Tetiana Savitska
- Choreographer: Nadia Ostapenko
- Retired: August 13, 2022
Medal record
Representing Ukraine
European Games
Bronze medal – third place	2019 Minsk	All-Around
Bronze medal – third place	2019 Minsk	Balance Beam
European Championships
Gold medal – first place	2020 Mersin	Team
FIG World Cup
Event	1st	2nd	3rd
World Cup	3	1	1
World Challenge Cup	6	4	3
Total	9	5	4

Diana Yevhenivna Varinska (Ukrainian: Діана Євгенівна Варінська, born 22 March 2001) is a retired Ukrainian artistic gymnast. She is the 2019 European Games all-around and balance beam bronze medalist. Additionally, she was a member of the team that won Ukraine's first European team title at the 2020 European Championships. She represented Ukraine at the 2020 Summer Olympics.

== Junior career ==
In 2015, Varinska competed in the European Youth Olympic Festival. She scored a 53.050 all-around in qualifications, which qualified her to the all-around final, and the uneven bars final. In the all-around, she scored a 51.100, placing 17th. In the uneven bars final, she came 4th, scoring 14.650: a significant improvement on her qualifying bars score of 14.100 and 2.5 points higher than her all-around bars score of 12.150.

2016 brought three international competitions for Varinska. In February, she swept the junior division of the Antonia Koshel Cup competition, held in Minsk, Belarus. Varinska placed first on every apparatus, and also in the all-around. In June, Varinska competed at the 2016 European Women's Artistic Gymnastics Championships, held in Bern, Switzerland. She placed 30th in the all-around competition, with a score of 50.099. She achieved a 13.900 on vault, 11.200 on the uneven bars, 12.366 on the balance beam, and 12.633 on the floor exercise. Varinska did not qualify into any finals. She contributed to the Ukrainian team's 152.787 points, to achieve an 11th-place finish in the team qualification.

Varinska's final international outing in 2016 saw her compete only uneven bars, balance beam, and floor exercise. She competed at the Belarusian Championships, where she qualified for all three finals. She did not, however, compete in those finals as both she and her teammate, Angelina Kysla, were unranked during the qualifications, due to not being Belarusian.

== Senior career ==
=== 2017 ===
Varinska turned 16 in 2017, which qualified her to compete in the senior division of competitions. She began her senior career at the Baku World Cup. She competed only on the uneven bars, qualifying in first place to the final. In the finals, she took the gold medal with a 13.933. The 2017 European Gymnastics Championships saw Varinska compete only on the uneven bars in qualification. She scored a disappointing 12.766 and failed to qualify into the final.

In May, Varinska competed in the Osijek Challenge Cup, held in Osijek, Croatia. She competed on the uneven bars, beam, and floor exercise in qualifications. She qualified into the beam and floor finals, but did not place, coming in 7th on beam and 4th on floor. In June, a video of Varinska's bars routine at the Ukraine Cup, an internal Ukrainian competition, emerged online. Fans were excited by its difficulty and good execution, but noted Varinska's tendency to falter in competition did not guarantee her success on the world stage at the World Championships, to be held in Montreal, Canada. However, she still competed well at these championships, qualifying to the uneven bars final and placing sixth with a clean routine. She hit all of her bar routines throughout the competition.

=== 2018 ===
Throughout the beginning of 2018, Varinska competed at multiple FIG World Cups, winning gold on uneven bars, balance beam, and floor exercise in Osijek. In August she competed at the European Championships where she helped Ukraine finish fifth in the team competition; however she failed to qualify to any individual event finals.

In October, Varinska represented Ukraine at the World Championships in Doha. The Ukrainian team finished 20th in the team qualification. Individually Varinska finished 37th in the all-around qualification and 14th on the balance beam and therefore did not qualify for any event finals.

=== 2019 ===
In March, Varinska competed at both the Baku and Doha World Cups as well as the Stella Zakharova Cup. The following month she competed at the European Championships where she qualified to the all-around final in fifteenth place. During the final she improved her ranking and finished in seventh place. In June, Varinska competed at the second European Games where she qualified to both the all-around and balance beam finals. During the all-around final she won the bronze medal behind Angelina Melnikova of Russia and Lorette Charpy of France. During the balance beam final she once again won bronze, this time behind Nina Derwael of Belgium and Melnikova. In September Varinska competed at the Paris Challenge Cup where she won gold on floor exercise and bronze on balance beam.

Varinska competed at the World Championships in Stuttgart. She helped Ukraine finish fifteenth as a team during qualifications but they did not manage to qualify a team to the Olympic Games. However, Varinska finished twenty-sixth in the all-around and qualified to the final and as an individual to the Olympic Games in Tokyo. During the all-around final Varinska finished in fifteenth place. In late October and November, Varinska competed at the Arthur Gander Memorial, where she won bronze, the Swiss Cup where she and Oleg Verniaiev won silver behind the American team of Jade Carey and Allan Bower, and the Cottbus World Cup where she won silver on the balance beam.

=== 2020 ===
Varinska began the season competing at the Melbourne World Cup where she won gold on uneven bars and placed fourth on balance beam. In March, she competed at the American Cup where she finished in 10th place. Most of the remaining meets scheduled to take place in 2020, including the Olympic Games, where either canceled or postponed until 2021 due to the worldwide COVID-19 pandemic. Varinska returned to competition in October at the Szombathely Challenge Cup where she won gold on uneven bars and placed fifth and fourth on balance beam and floor exercise respectively.

Prior to the European Championships, Varinska tested positive for COVID-19 and did not train for fourteen days as a result. However, she was able to return in time to compete at the European Championships. During qualifications, she helped Ukraine qualify second to the team final behind Romania and individually she qualified to the floor exercise final. During the team final, Ukraine came out and won their first ever team gold medal at a European Championships.

=== 2021 ===
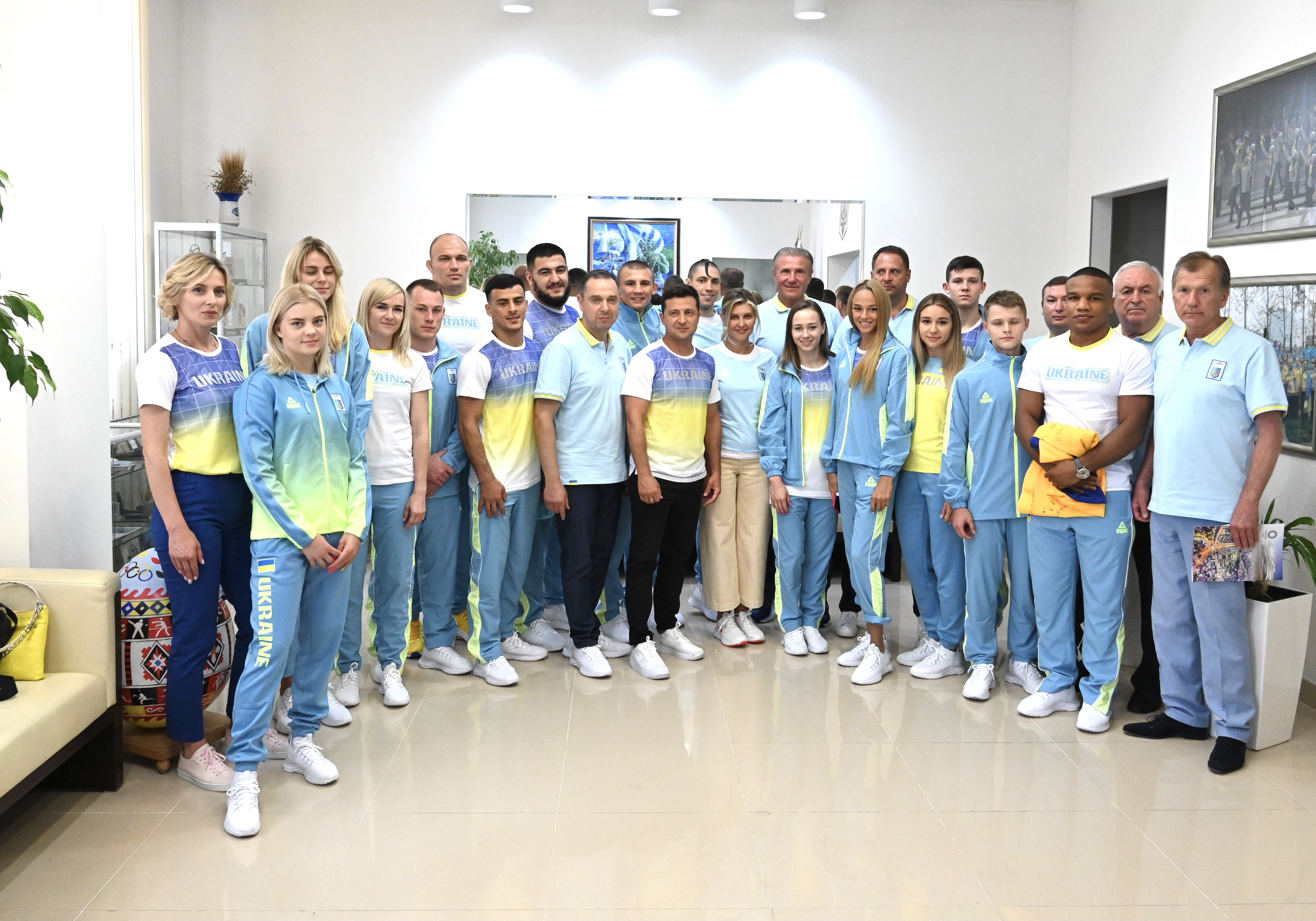
Varinska (standing beside First Lady Olena Zelenska) with other athletes at the Olympic House in Kyiv, 11 July 2021

Varinska represented Ukraine at the 2020 Summer Olympics (postponed to 2021 due to the COVID-19 pandemic). During the qualification round, she placed 62nd with a total score of 49.565. In December Varinska announced her engagement to Kazakh Olympic gymnast Milad Karimi.

=== 2022 ===
Varinska announced her retirement from the sport on August 13.

== Competitive history ==
Year	Event	Team	AA	VT	UB	BB	FX
Junior
2013	KSI Matsz Cup	2nd place, silver medalist(s)	1st place, gold medalist(s)				
2015	Euro Youth Olympic Festival	9	17		4		
2016	Antonia Koshel Cup		1st place, gold medalist(s)				
2016	European Championships	R3					
Senior
2017	Baku World Cup				1st place, gold medalist(s)		
2017	Osijek World Cup					7	4
2017	Paris Challenge Cup				3rd place, bronze medalist(s)		3rd place, bronze medalist(s)
2017	World Championships		14		6		
2017	Arthur Gander Memorial		3rd place, bronze medalist(s)				
2017	Swiss Cup	4					
2017	Cottbus World Cup					7	8
2018	Top 12 Series 4			3rd place, bronze medalist(s)	1st place, gold medalist(s)		
2018	Stella Zakharova Cup		1st place, gold medalist(s)		1st place, gold medalist(s)	1st place, gold medalist(s)	1st place, gold medalist(s)
2018	Osijek Challenge Cup				1st place, gold medalist(s)	1st place, gold medalist(s)	1st place, gold medalist(s)
2018	Ukraine Cup		1st place, gold medalist(s)		3rd place, bronze medalist(s)	1st place, gold medalist(s)	2nd place, silver medalist(s)
2018	European Championships	5			R1		
2018	Paris Challenge Cup				6	4	
2018	Arthur Gander Memorial		6				
2018	Swiss Cup	4					
2018	Cottbus World Cup				6	3rd place, bronze medalist(s)	
2018	Joaquin Blume Memorial		1st place, gold medalist(s)				
2019	Top 12 Semi-Finals			2nd place, silver medalist(s)	2nd place, silver medalist(s)		
2019	Baku World Cup				4		8
2019	Doha World Cup				8		
2019	Stella Zakharova Cup				1st place, gold medalist(s)		
2019	European Championships		7				R1
2019	European Games		3rd place, bronze medalist(s)			3rd place, bronze medalist(s)	
2019	Paris Challenge Cup				8	3rd place, bronze medalist(s)	1st place, gold medalist(s)
2019	World Championships		15				
2019	Arthur Gander Memorial		3rd place, bronze medalist(s)				
2019	Swiss Cup	2nd place, silver medalist(s)					
2019	Cottbus World Cup				4	2nd place, silver medalist(s)	
2020	Melbourne World Cup				1st place, gold medalist(s)	4	
2020	American Cup		10				
2020	Szombathely World Cup				1st place, gold medalist(s)	5	4
2020	European Championships	1st place, gold medalist(s)					4
2021
2021	European Championships				R3		
2021	Varna Challenge Cup				2nd place, silver medalist(s)		7
2021	Cairo Challenge Cup				1st place, gold medalist(s)	2nd place, silver medalist(s)	2nd place, silver medalist(s)
2021	Osijek Challenge Cup					2nd place, silver medalist(s)	
2021	Doha World Cup				4	1st place, gold medalist(s)	
2021	Olympic Games		62				

== Floor music ==
Year	Music Title
2017–2020	"Ave Maria" by Libera & "Immortelle" by Lara Fabian
2020	"Sweet Dreams (Are Made of This)" by Escala
