= Jade Carey =

American artistic gymnast (born 2000)

- Carey at the 2026 U.S. Championships

Personal information
- Full name: Jade Ashtyn Carey
- Born: May 27, 2000 (age 26) Phoenix, Arizona, U.S.

Gymnastics career
- Discipline: Women's artistic gymnastics
- Country represented: United States; (2017–present)
- College team: Oregon State Beavers (2022–2025)
- Gym: Arizona Sunrays
- Head coaches: Brian Carey; Tanya Chaplin
- Assistant coach: Pam Evans
- Choreographer: Betty Okino
- Awards: See awards
Medal record
Event	1st	2nd	3rd
Olympic Games	2	0	1
World Championships	3	3	1
NCAA Championships	0	4	2
Total	5	7	4
Event	1st	2nd	3rd
Vault (OG/WC)	1	2	1
Floor Exercise (OG/WC)	1	1	1
Women's artistic gymnastics
Representing the United States
Olympic Games
Gold medal – first place	2020 Tokyo	Floor Exercise
Gold medal – first place	2024 Paris	Team
Bronze medal – third place	2024 Paris	Vault
World Championships
Gold medal – first place	2019 Stuttgart	Team
Gold medal – first place	2022 Liverpool	Team
Gold medal – first place	2022 Liverpool	Vault
Silver medal – second place	2017 Montreal	Vault
Silver medal – second place	2017 Montreal	Floor Exercise
Silver medal – second place	2019 Stuttgart	Vault
Bronze medal – third place	2022 Liverpool	Floor Exercise
Pan American Championships
Gold medal – first place	2018 Lima	Team
Gold medal – first place	2018 Lima	Vault
Gold medal – first place	2018 Lima	Floor Exercise
FIG World Cup Series
Event	1st	2nd	3rd
Apparatus World Cup	6	1	0
World Challenge Cup	1	1	0
Total	7	2	0
Representing the Oregon State Beavers
NCAA Championships
Silver medal – second place	2022 Fort Worth	Uneven Bars
Silver medal – second place	2023 Fort Worth	Balance Beam
Silver medal – second place	2024 Fort Worth	All-Around
Silver medal – second place	2024 Fort Worth	Floor Exercise
Bronze medal – third place	2024 Fort Worth	Balance Beam
Bronze medal – third place	2025 Fort Worth	Balance Beam

Jade Ashtyn Carey (born May 27, 2000) is an American artistic gymnast. She represented the United States at the 2020 Summer Olympics as an individual, and at the 2024 Summer Olympics as a member of the U.S. women's team, nicknamed the "Golden Girls".

Best known for her abilities on vault and floor exercise, she is the 2020 Olympic champion on floor exercise and the 2024 Olympic bronze medalist on vault. On floor exercise, she is a two-time World medalist (2017 silver, 2022 bronze), the 2018 Pan American Champion, and a four-time American national silver medalist (2017–2019, 2022). On vault, she is the 2022 World champion, a two-time World silver medalist (2017, 2019), the 2018 Pan American champion, and a two-time American national champion (2017, 2022). She has also won nine medals at the FIG World Cup. She was a member of the teams that won gold at the 2024 Olympic Games, the 2019 World Championships, the 2022 World Championships, and the 2018 Pan American Championships.

In NCAA Gymnastics, she competed with the Oregon State Beavers gymnastics team, where she has won seven Pac-12 titles, six medals at the NCAA Championships, and received multiple conference honors. With a total of ten Olympic and World Championship medals, Carey is tied with Aly Raisman as the fifth most decorated U.S. female gymnast of all time.

== Elite gymnastics career ==
In 2016, Carey competed at the Junior Olympics Nationals where she successfully completed a tucked Kasamatsu full on vault, after which it was named The Carey in the J.O. code of points. Carey was invited to her first elite level national team camp in late 2016.

=== 2017 ===
Carey began 2017 as a Level 10 gymnast, which is below elite level in USA Gymnastics. She was invited to The Ranch by national team coordinator Valeri Liukin throughout the start of the year where she qualified for elite status.

Carey made her elite debut at the American Classic at Karolyi Ranch on July 7, 2017. She only competed on vault, floor, and balance beam but placed first on each of those events. Later that month, she competed at the 2017 U.S. Classic and once again only competed on vault, floor, and balance beam. She placed first on vault, where she competed an Amanar and a double-twisting Tsukahara, first on floor, including both a full-twisting double layout (Chusovitina) and double-twisting double tuck (Silivas) in her routine, and fourth on balance beam. In August, Carey participated in the 2017 U.S. National Gymnastics Championships where she won gold on vault and silver on floor exercise, behind Ragan Smith. She was named to the national team for the first time.

In September, Carey was selected to represent the United States at the 2017 World Artistic Gymnastics Championships in Montreal alongside Ragan Smith, Morgan Hurd, and Ashton Locklear. On the first day of competition, Carey competed only on floor and vault. With clean performances on both, she qualified third for the floor exercise final (14.100), behind Smith and Mai Murakami of Japan, and second for the vault final, behind reigning world champion Maria Paseka of Russia.

During event finals, Carey won the silver medal on both vault and floor exercise, once again finishing behind Paseka and Murakami respectively.

=== 2018 ===
Carey competed at the American Classic in early July in Salt Lake City, Utah. She competed her first elite uneven bars routine in addition to her routine on balance beam and placed 10th on each apparatus. On July 28, Carey made her elite all-around debut at the 2018 U.S. Classic. She placed first on vault, where she debuted a Lopez as her new second vault, and second on floor behind Simone Biles, where she debuted a Moors (double-twisting double layout) as her opening pass. However, she only placed 10th all-around due to a fall on uneven bars and a major error on her beam dismount.

In August, Carey competed at the National Championships where she placed sixth in the all-around, earning an automatic national team spot. She also finished third on vault behind Biles and Jordan Chiles, second on floor exercise behind Biles, 15th on uneven bars, and 9th on balance beam. On August 20 Carey was named to the team to compete at the Pan American Championships alongside Grace McCallum, Trinity Thomas, Kara Eaker, and Shilese Jones. There she won gold in the team finals and on vault and floor exercise.

In October, the nominative team roster for the 2018 World Championships in Doha, Qatar was posted. Carey was noticeably absent despite her strong performances at the previous two competitions. USAG later revealed that Carey had declined her invitation to the Worlds qualification camp and was going to pursue qualifying for the 2020 Olympics "as an individual through the apparatus World Cup series, which precludes her competing on the 2018 World Team". As the American team later won the gold medal at the championships and thus qualified to the Olympics, she would have been ineligible to qualify a nominative spot on the World Cup series had she competed in Doha.

In November, USAG announced that Carey would be competing at the Cottbus World Cup. She qualified second to the vault final behind Rebeca Andrade of Brazil and first to the floor exercise final. During event finals Carey won silver on vault, once again behind Andrade, and fifth on floor exercise after stepping out of bounds three times.

=== 2019 ===
In February, USA Gymnastics announced that Carey would compete at the Baku and Doha World Cups in March. In Baku, Carey qualified in first place to the vault final after upgrading her López (start value 5.2) to a Cheng (start value 6.0) and qualified second to the floor exercise final behind Lara Mori of Italy after going out of bounds and performing a watered down routine. She received the AGF Trophy for having the highest combined execution score in the qualification round. Carey won the gold medal in the vault final and was the only gymnast to earn execution scores above nine on both of her vaults. The following day, she competed in the floor exercise final with higher difficulty and won the gold medal ahead of Mori and three-time Olympian Vanessa Ferrari. At the Doha World Cup, Carey qualified to the vault final in second place behind Maria Paseka and first to the floor exercise final, 0.8 points ahead of second place Marine Boyer of France and Kim Bui of Germany. In the vault final, Carey won the gold medal, defeating Paseka by 0.117 points. Once again she was the only competitor to earn an execution score above 9 on both of her vaults. In the floor exercise final, Carey once again won the gold medal ahead of Mori and Ferrari, defeating them by more than one point.

At the 2019 GK US Classic in July, Carey placed tenth in the all-around. She won the gold medal on vault ahead of Aleah Finnegan and Shilese Jones and she tied with Grace McCallum for the silver medal on floor exercise behind Simone Biles. She placed fifteenth on uneven bars and tied for seventeenth on balance beam with Alexis Jeffrey.

At the 2019 U.S. National Championships Carey competed on all four events and ended the first day of competition in third in the all-around behind Biles and Sunisa Lee. On the second day of competition she fell off the uneven bars and finished seventh in the all-around but won silver on vault and floor exercise, finishing behind Biles on both. As a result she was added to the national team for the third time.

In September Carey competed at the US World Championships trials where she placed fifth in the all-around behind Simone Biles, Sunisa Lee, Kara Eaker, and MyKayla Skinner. The following day she was named to the team to compete at the 2019 World Championships in Stuttgart alongside Biles, Lee, Eaker, Skinner, and Grace McCallum.

During qualifications she helped the USA qualify to the team final in first place over five points ahead of second place China. Individually she qualified to the vault final in first place ahead of Biles and recorded the second highest floor exercise score, behind Biles and tied with Lee. However, due to Lee receiving a higher execution score, Carey did not qualify to the floor exercise final due to the rule limiting individual finals to two competitors per country. In the team final, Carey competed on vault and floor exercise, receiving the second highest scores of the day on each, behind Biles, and helping the USA win the gold medal ahead of Russia and Italy. During the vault final Carey performed a Cheng and an Amanar, taking a step out of bounds on the latter, earning an average score of 14.883 and winning the silver medal behind Biles and ahead of Ellie Downie of Great Britain.

In November Carey traveled to Zürich, Switzerland to compete at the Swiss Cup, a unique team competition that featured one female gymnast and one male gymnast from the same country going head-to-head with other teams. She was partnered with Allan Bower. Together they finished in first place, beating the Ukrainian team of Diana Varinska and Oleg Verniaiev.

=== 2020 ===
In late January Carey was listed on a nominative roster that was released for the Melbourne World Cup, scheduled to take place on February 20. She qualified in first place to both the vault and floor exercise event finals, 0.833 points ahead of Shoko Miyata and 0.633 points ahead of Vanessa Ferrari respectively. During the vault final she competed the Cheng and double twisting Yurchenko and won gold ahead of Coline Devillard of France. The following day she won gold on floor exercise as well, once again finishing ahead of Ferrari.

=== 2021 ===
In February Carey competed at the 2021 Winter Cup where she only competed on vault, uneven bars, and balance beam. She finished second on vault behind Jordan Chiles, sixth on uneven bars, and ninth on balance beam. The following month at a National Team camp Carey was named to the National Team for the fourth time. In May Carey competed at the U.S. Classic on only the uneven bars and balance beam. She finished fifth and fifteenth respectively.

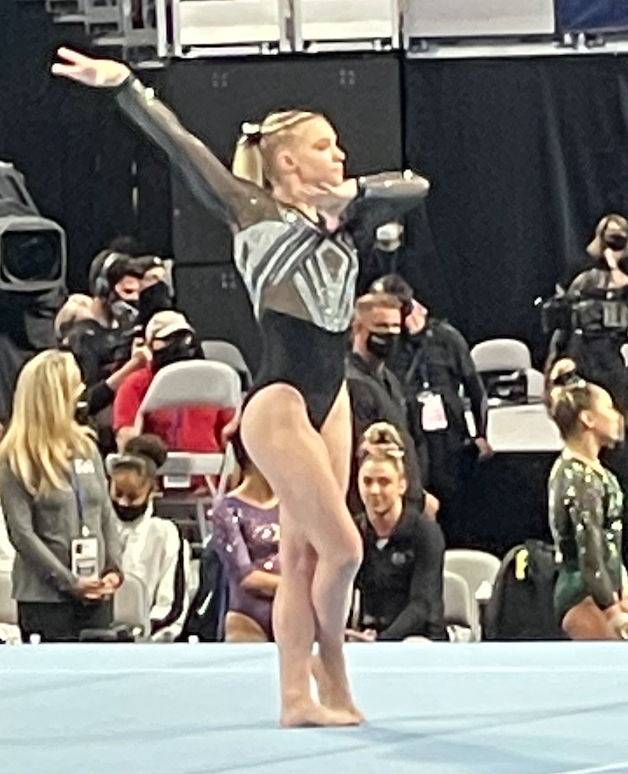
Carey at the 2021 U.S. National Championships

During podium training for the National Championships Carey debuted a laid out version of the Biles II (triple twisting double salto). At the National Championships Carey finished sixth in the all-around after competing a watered-down floor exercise routine and vault. She finished fourth on vault, eighth on uneven bars and floor exercise, and eleventh on balance beam. As a result she was added to the national team and qualified to compete at the Olympic Trials. At the Olympic Trials Carey competed all-around the first day of competition and only competed on uneven bars and balance beam the second day. Days after trials had concluded Carey was officially awarded an Olympic berth via the Apparatus World Cup series.

==== 2020 Olympics ====
At the Olympic Games, Carey performed the all-around during qualifications. She hit all four routines and qualified for the vault final in second place behind Simone Biles as well as the floor exercise final in third place behind Vanessa Ferrari and Biles.

Despite finishing ninth in qualifications, she initially did not qualify to the all-around final due to two-per-country limitations as Biles and Sunisa Lee placed higher. However, Biles later withdrew from the all-around final, and Carey, as the next-highest scoring American, took her place. During the all-around final Carey recorded the second highest vault (behind Rebeca Andrade) and floor exercise (behind Mai Murakami and tied with Angelina Melnikova) scores; however she fell off the balance beam and finished eighth overall.

In the vault final, Carey was a heavy medal favorite but finished in last place after balking her first vault due to missteps on the runway; she had intended to perform a Cheng vault but performed only a tucked Yurchenko, a vault with a difficulty score of just 3.3. She went on to successfully perform her second vault, an Amanar with a difficulty of 5.8, but was deducted two points for performing two vaults with the same entry, finishing with an average score of 12.416, more than two full points behind the seventh finisher.

The following day, Carey won the gold medal in the floor exercise final with a score of 14.366, outperforming her qualifications score of 14.100 and placing ahead of Italy's Vanessa Ferrari. She is the third consecutive American champion on the event, following Aly Raisman in 2012 and Simone Biles in 2016.

Upon returning home to Arizona, Phoenix Mayor Kate Gallego proclaimed August 17 as "Jade Carey Day". Days later it was announced that Carey would be joining Simone Biles' Gold Over America Tour. On August 30 Carey threw the ceremonial first pitch for the Arizona Diamondbacks.

=== 2022 ===
Carey made her elite return at the U.S. National Championships in August. She placed fifth in the all-around, first on vault, second on floor exercise behind Shilese Jones, seventh on balance beam, and ninth on uneven bars. She was named to the national team for the sixth time. Additionally she was named USA Gymnastics Athlete of the Year. In September Carey competed at the Paris World Challenge Cup; she only competed on vault and balance beam. She qualified to the vault final in first and the balance beam final in second behind teammate Shilese Jones. During event finals she won gold on vault and silver on balance beam behind Marine Boyer of France.

In October Carey was selected to compete at the 2022 World Championships alongside Skye Blakely, Jordan Chiles, Shilese Jones, and Leanne Wong. During the qualification round Carey helped the USA qualify to the team final in first place. Individually she qualified to the all-around, vault, and floor exercise finals. During the team final Carey contributed scores on vault, balance beam, and floor exercise towards the USA's gold medal finish. Additionally she posted the second highest vault and floor exercise scores of the competition behind Rebeca Andrade and Jessica Gadirova respectively. During the all-around final Carey placed sixth after a tentative balance beam routine. On the first day of apparatus finals Carey won gold on vault, earning her first individual world title. On the final day of competition she won bronze on floor exercise, tied with Andrade and behind Gadirova and Chiles. With eight world and Olympic medals Carey became the sixth most decorated American female artistic gymnast of all time.

=== 2023 ===
In September, Carey won the bronze medal for vault at the U.S. National Championships. Carey was selected to compete at the Swiss Cup, taking place in early November. During the competition she was paired with Yul Moldauer. Together they placed first, each winning their second Swiss Cup.

=== 2024 ===
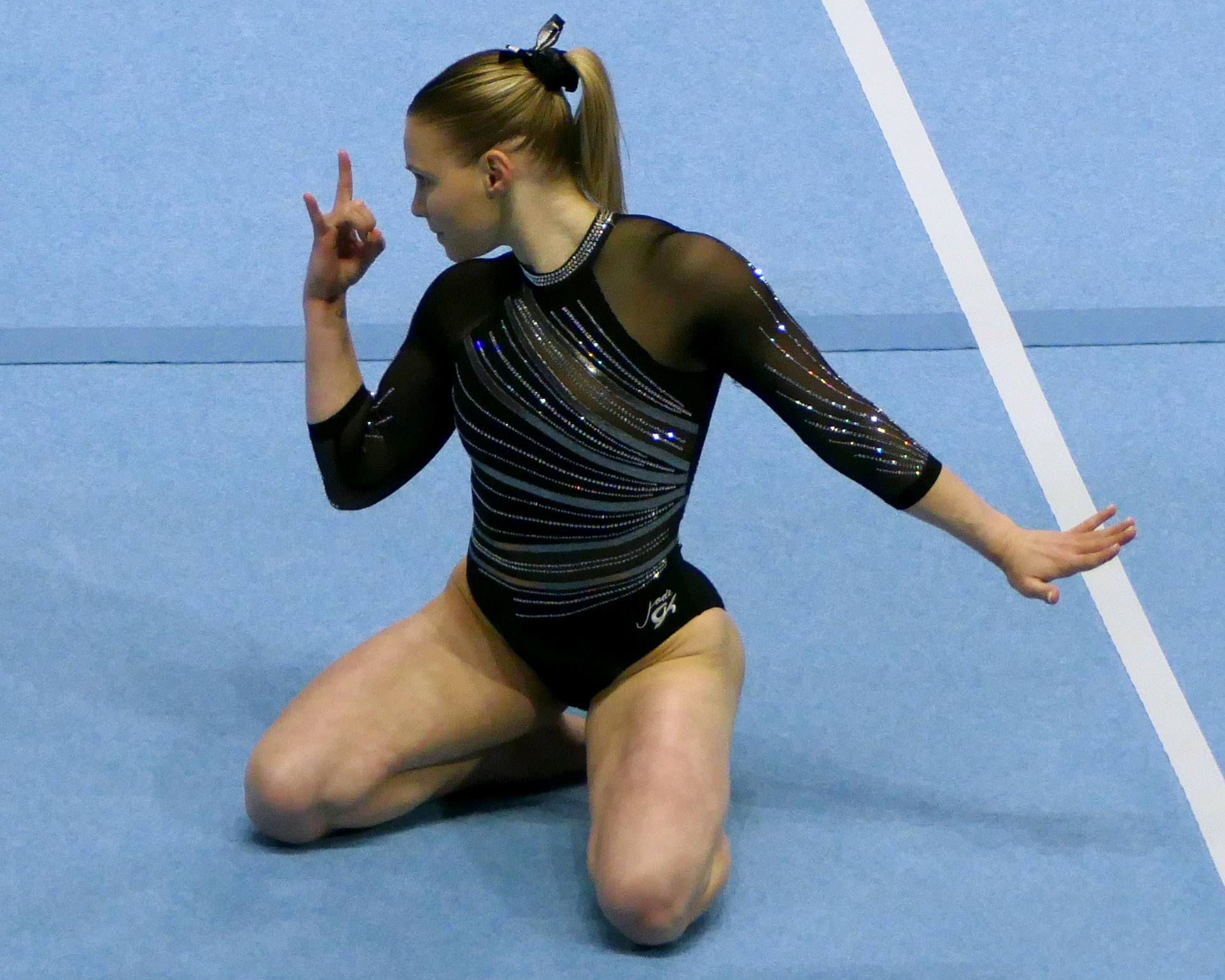
U.S. Classic

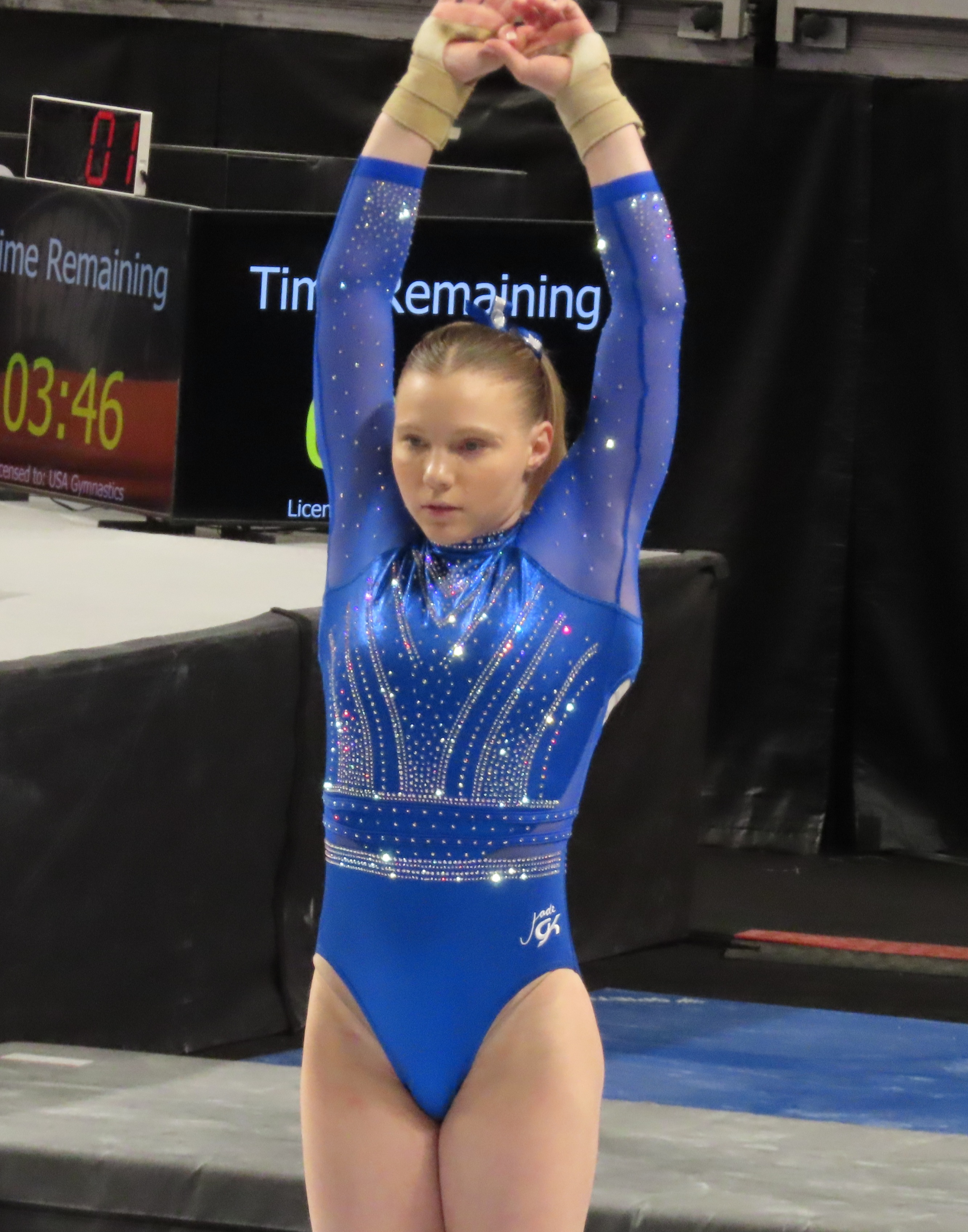
National Championships

Carey competing in 2024

Carey began the season competing at the American Classic where she placed first in the all-around. She next competed at the Core Hydration Classic where she placed fourth in the all-around behind Simone Biles, Shilese Jones, and Jordan Chiles; she won gold on vault. At the National Championships Carey placed seventh in the all-around and third on vault. As a result she qualified to the Olympic trials.

At the Olympic trials Carey placed fourth in the all-around, first on vault, eighth on uneven bars, sixth on balance beam, and second on floor exercise. As a result, she was selected to represent the United States at the 2024 Summer Olympics alongside Biles, Chiles, Sunisa Lee, and Hezly Rivera.

==== 2024 Olympics ====
During the qualification round, Carey competed only on floor exercise and vault. During her floor exercise routine, she experienced uncharacteristic mistakes and balked her last pass, resulting in a score of 10.633. She later explained that she had not been feeling well the past few days leading up to qualifications and therefore had depleted energy. Right after floor exercise, the team competed on vault where Carey bounced back and competed two clean vaults which advanced her to the vault final in third place; additionally the United States qualified to the team final in first place. During the team final, Carey contributed a score of 14.800 on vault towards the team's first place finish, earning the United States their fourth overall Olympic team gold medal. In the vault final, she scored a 14.466 to win the bronze, her third Olympic medal.

=== 2025–2026 ===
Carey did not compete in elite gymnastics in 2025. In April 2026, Carey posted on Instagram that she intended to make an elite comeback. The following month she announced that she would make her return at the 2026 American Classic. At the competition she finished second in the all-around behind Tatum Drusch but earned the highest scores on vault (14.250) and floor exercise (13.100). Carey next competed at the U.S. Classic, where she finished second in the all-around behind Reese Esponda, won gold on vault and placed second on floor exercise. This result marked her first all-around podium finish at the U.S. Classic since making her first appearance at the competition in 2017. At the 2026 National Championships, Carey finished fifth in the all-around. She placed first on vault and third on floor exercise behind Esponda and Hezly Rivera.

In September she participated in the USA Gymnastics team selection camp for the 2026 World Championships and was named a non-traveling replacement athlete.

== Collegiate gymnastics career ==
Carey verbally committed to compete in NCAA gymnastics at Oregon State University, starting in the 2018-19 school year. She officially signed with the Oregon State Beavers on November 9, 2017. She deferred enrollment until after the 2020 Olympics, starting in the 2020–21 school year. However, due to the postponement of the Olympics, Carey enrolled in classes for the 2020–21 school year but deferred competing for the Beavers until after the Olympics in 2021.

=== 2021–2022 season ===
Carey made her long-awaited NCAA debut on January 15, 2022, 1528 days after she signed her national letter of intent with Oregon State University. In the tri-meet against Washington and San Jose State Carey competed on all four apparatuses earning a 9.95 on the uneven bars and a 9.90 on the other three events, totaling a 39.650 all-around score. She outright won the all-around, vault, uneven bars, and floor exercise titles and co-won the balance beam title alongside teammate Jenna Domingo and Skylar Killough-Wilhelm of Washington. Additionally Carey competed various elite-level skills including the double-twisting Yurchenko on vault, the Bhardwaj on the uneven bars, and the double-twisting double salto (Silivas) on floor exercise.

Due to the new NIL rule change for NCAA athletes in the summer of 2021, Carey was eligible to profit off of her name, image, and likeness. It was later reported that Carey had earned the biggest deal of all athletes from Oregon-based universities.

On January 23, at the second meet of the season against UCLA and UC Davis, Carey scored 9.975 on balance beam and floor exercise, 9.950 on uneven bars, and 9.90 on vault, totaling 39.800 in the all-around. She outright won all five contested titles. Additionally Carey's all-around score beat Oregon State gymnastics' previous all-around record of 39.750, set by Chari Knight in 1993. As a result Carey was named both Pac-12 gymnast of the week and freshman of the week. In her third collegiate meet and her first away meet Carey once again won the all-around with a score of 39.775, Oregon State's second highest program all-around score. She also outright won the vault (9.95), uneven bars (9.95), and floor exercise (9.95) titles and co-won the balance beam (9.925) title with California's Emi Watterson. Carey was subsequently named Freshman of the Week for the second time. On February 5, in a meet against Arizona State, Carey earned her first career perfect ten on the uneven bars. Her all-around score of 39.825 beat Oregon State's all-around program record that she had set two weeks prior. Additionally she outright won all five contested titles and was named Pac-12 Gymnast of the Week for the second time. On February 13 Carey earned her second career perfect 10 and first on floor exercise; she was once again named both Pac-12 gymnast and freshman of the week. On February 25, in a meet against Stanford, Carey score another perfect ten on floor exercise. Additionally she posted an all-around score of 39.825, tying Oregon State's program all-around record that she set earlier in the month. Carey ended the regular season competing at a quad meet in Denver on March 13. She posted a 9.95 on all four apparatuses and won her ninth consecutive all-around title. She was named Pac-12 Freshman of the Week for the sixth time.

Carey was named Pac-12 gymnast of the year and freshman of the year. At the Pac-12 Championships Carey led Oregon State to a third place finish. Individually she won the all-around title and co-won the title on floor exercise alongside Olympic teammate Grace McCallum. She placed second on the remaining three apparatuses. At the NCAA regional semifinal in Seattle, Carey earned an all-around score of 39.850, beating her previous record. Although Oregon State was eliminated after finishing third behind Utah and Stanford, Carey earned an individual all-around berth to compete at the upcoming NCAA Championship.

In early April Carey announced her decision to continue pursuing elite level gymnastics while competing NCAA gymnastics. At the NCAA championship Carey rotated with the Oklahoma Sooners in the first semi-final. She earned an all-around score of 39.650, the highest in the first semi-final but fourth highest overall. Her score of 9.950 on the uneven bars was the second highest behind Trinity Thomas.

=== 2022–2023 season ===
Carey made her 2023 season debut at the Super 16 Invitational on January 6. The following week she competed at the Wasatch Classic where she earned two perfect 10s on vault and floor exercise. As a result she was named Pac-12 Gymnast of the Week. The following week, in a quad-meet against Denver, Brown, and Sacramento State, Carey earned an all-around score of 39.825 to help Oregon State win the meet. In a meet on March 4 at Arizona State University Carey earned her first perfect ten on balance beam. In doing so she became the thirteenth gymnast to complete a gym slam, the accomplishment of scoring a perfect 10.0 on each apparatus.

At the Pac-12 Championships Carey earned an all-around score of 39.750 to win the all-around competition for the second straight year. Additionally she co-won the titles on balance beam and floor exercise alongside Mya Luazon and Jordan Chiles respectively. Additionally Carey was named Pac-12 Gymnast of the Year for the second time.

Carey qualified to compete at the 2023 NCAA Championship as an individual on balance beam. She scored 9.9625 on the apparatus and finished as co-runner up on the event behind Maile O'Keefe.

=== 2023–2024 season ===
After the 2023 season concluded, Carey announced that she would remain at Oregon State while also pursuing making the 2024 Olympic team. Although she competed all four events at nearly every meet in her first two seasons, Carey expressed that she would compete in a more limited capacity for the 2024 season. At the first meet of the season, the Mean Girls Super 16 event in Las Vegas, Carey competed on only uneven bars and balance beam, earning a 9.975 and a 9.90 respectively. She was named Pac 12 specialist of the week.

At the Pac-12 Championships, Carey competed in the all-around and helped the Beavers finish fifth. She earned her first perfect 10 of the season on floor exercise to outright win the title. Additionally she co-won the uneven bars title alongside Selena Harris of UCLA and was the all-around runner-up alongside Grace McCallum and behind Harris.

Carey qualified as an all-around individual to compete at the NCAA National Championships; she rotated with the Florida Gators. During the competition Carey finished second in the all-around behind Haleigh Bryant and tied with Leanne Wong, second on floor exercise behind Aleah Finnegan and tied with seven other gymnasts, and third on balance beam behind Audrey Davis and Faith Torrez and tied with seven other gymnasts.

=== 2024–2025 season ===
Following the 2024 Olympics, Carey announced that she would return to Oregon State to compete for her senior season. She made her 2025 season debut at the Pacific Coast Challenge, a tri-meet between Oregon State, UCLA, and California. While there she won the all-around and balance beam titles outright and co-won the floor exercise title.

On January 11, in a meet against the BYU Cougars, Carey swept the event title race posting four 9.900+ scores, finishing with 39.725 in the all-around. The following week, in a meet against San Jose State, Carey scored a 39.800, winning the all-around outright. She won the balance beam and uneven bars titles with 9.975s, posting a 9.950 on floor tied with her teammate, Garcia. On January 24 in a dual meet with Auburn, Carey tied on both the balance beam and floor exercise titles, posting 9.90, and placed third on vault and uneven bars. She continued to outright win the all-around title posting a 39.625.

On February 7 in a tri-meet against Alaska and UC Davis, Carey once again won the all-around with a 39.675, while also taking home vault, balance beam, and floor exercise titles. In a tri-meet against Alaska and Washington Carey won the all-around title with a score of 39.575. On February 16 at the Denver Quad, a quad-meet between Ball State, Texas Womsn's University, and University of Denver, Carey won the all-around with a score of 39.725. This also marks her seventh all-around win in so many meets.

At the 2025 Metroplex Challenge on February 21, Carey won the all-around for the eighth time this season with a score of 39.675, while also winning the event titles on uneven bars (9.925), floor exercise (9.925), and balance beam (9.950). With this Carey became the sole Oregon State gymnast to hold the program record for the most 39-plus all-around scores in school history with 40. In a meet against San Jose State, Carey swept the all-around and all of the event titles; she won the all-around with a score of 39.825.

On March 15 – Oregon State's Senior Night – in a meet against the Air Force Falcons, Carey posted a career best all-around score of 39.925, scoring perfect 10.0s on balance beam and floor exercise. By earning her second career perfect 10 on the balance beam, Carey became the fourth NCAA gymnast to earn a second Gym Slam, following Maggie Nichols, Kyla Ross, and Trinity Thomas. By scoring a 39.925, Carey earned the fourth best all-around score in NCAA history, behind Karin Lichey (40.000), Mohini Bhardwaj (39.975), and Suzanne Metz (39.950) and tied with Jordan Bowers, Haleigh Bryant, and Nichols. Carey ended the regular season competing in a meet again Fisk University. She won the all-around with a score of 39.850, highlighted by a perfect ten on floor exercise.

Carey was named as one of the six finalists for the AAI Award alongside Bowers, Audrey Davis, Aleah Finnegan, Grace McCallum, and Leanne Wong.

Oregon State competed in the Alabama Regional. During the semi-final Carey scored an all-around total of 39.850, once again the highest score of the competition and highlighted by a perfect ten on floor exercise. In doing so she helped Oregon State advance to the regional final. During the regional final Oregon State placed fourth and did not advance. Despite this Carey's all-around score of 39.700 was once again the highest of the meet. Due to being the highest placed all-arounder not part of a qualified team, Carey advanced to the 2025 NCAA Championships as an individual. She is set to rotate with the reigning champions, the LSU Tigers.

Prior to the start of the NCAA Championships, Carey was awarded the AAI Award, which recognizes the top senior female gymnast in the nation for their dedication, leadership, and excellence in the sport. She became the fourth gymnast from Oregon State to win the award following Mary Ayotte-Law (1982), Joy Selig (1991), and Chari Knight (1994).

=== Career perfect 10.0 ===
Carey is one of only four gymnasts to complete the NCAA Gym Slam multiple times, recording a perfect 10.0 on all four events at least twice in her NCAA career.

Season	Date	Event	Meet
2022	February 5, 2022	Uneven bars	Oregon State vs Arizona State
2022	February 13, 2022	Floor exercise	Oregon State vs Washington
2022	February 25, 2022	Floor exercise	Oregon State vs Stanford
2023	January 14, 2023	Vault	Wasatch Classic
2023	January 14, 2023	Floor exercise	Wasatch Classic
2023	February 18, 2023	Vault	Oregon State vs Arizona
2023	February 18, 2023	Floor exercise	Oregon State vs Arizona
2023	February 24, 2023	Uneven bars	Oregon State @ Stanford
2023	February 24, 2023	Floor exercise	Oregon State @ Stanford
2023	March 4, 2023	Balance beam	Oregon State @ Arizona State
2024	March 23, 2024	Floor exercise	Pac 12 Championships
2024	April 4, 2024	Floor exercise	Arkansas Regional Semifinal
2025	March 15, 2025	Balance beam	Oregon State vs Air Force
2025	March 15, 2025	Floor exercise	Oregon State vs Air Force
2025	March 21, 2025	Floor exercise	Oregon State vs Fisk
2025	April 4, 2025	Floor exercise	Alabama Regional Semifinal

=== NCAA Regular season ranking ===
Season	All-Around	Vault	Uneven Bars	Balance Beam	Floor Exercise
2022	1st	6th	2nd	11th	3rd
2023	1st	2nd	4th	2nd	1st
2024	2nd	77th	4th	21st	2nd
2025	1st	15th	7th	1st	7th

== Personal life ==
Carey was born and raised in Phoenix, Arizona. Her parents, Brian Carey and Danielle Mitchell-Greenberg, owned a gym when she was born, allowing her to get involved with gymnastics at a young age. She officially began gymnastics in 2002.

Her parents divorced when she was young. She attended Mountain Ridge High School in Glendale, Arizona, graduating in 2018. In early 2024 Carey was inducted into the Mountain Ridge Athletics Hall of Fame.

On March 19, 2025, Carey revealed in an Instagram post that she is dating Aimee Sinacola. This was the first time that Carey had spoken publicly about her sexuality. Many of Carey's fellow gymnasts and Olympians commented on the post to show their support.

== Selected competitive skills ==
Apparatus	Name	Description	Difficulty (Note: Valid for the 2022-2024 Code of Points)	Performed
Vault	López	Yurchenko half-on entry, laid out salto forwards with ½ twist	4.8	2018, 2023, 2026
Vault	Baitova	Yurchenko entry, laid out salto backwards with two twists	5.0	2018–26
Vault	Zamolodchikova	Tsukahara entry, laid out salto backwards with two twists	5.2	2017
Vault	Amanar	Yurchenko entry, laid out salto backwards with 2½ twists	5.4	2017, 2019–21, 2024
Vault	Cheng	Yurchenko half-on entry, laid out salto forwards with 1½ twists	5.6	2019–24
Uneven Bars	Bhardwaj	Laid out salto from high bar to low bar with full twist	E	2019–26
Uneven Bars	Van Leeuwen	Toe-on Shaposhnikova transition with ½ twist to high bar	E	2019–26
Uneven Bars	Church	Toe-on Tkatchev piked	E	2021–22
Uneven Bars	DLO 1/1	Dismount: Full-twisting (1/1) double layout	E	2026
Uneven Bars	Fabrichnova	Dismount: Double-twisting (2/1) double tucked salto backwards	F	2024
Balance Beam	Double Pike	Dismount: Double piked salto backwards	E	2017–19, 2022–24
Balance Beam	Layout	Laid out salto backwards with legs together (to two feet)	E	2019
Floor Exercise	Mukhina	Full-twisting (1/1) double tucked salto backwards	E	2017–24
Floor Exercise	Double Layout	Double laid out salto backwards	F	2018–26
Floor Exercise	Chusovitina	Full-twisting (1/1) double laid out salto backwards	H	2017–26
Floor Exercise	Silivas	Double-twisting (2/1) double tucked salto backwards	H	2017–26
Floor Exercise	Moors	Double-twisting (2/1) double laid out salto backwards	I	2018–24

== Competitive history ==
Competitive history of Jade Carey at the elite level
Year	Event	Team	AA	VT	UB	BB	FX
2017
2017	American Classic			1st place, gold medalist(s)		1st place, gold medalist(s)	1st place, gold medalist(s)
2017	US Classic			1st place, gold medalist(s)		4	1st place, gold medalist(s)
2017	P&G US National Championships			1st place, gold medalist(s)		11	2nd place, silver medalist(s)
2017	World Championships	—N/a		2nd place, silver medalist(s)			2nd place, silver medalist(s)
2018
2018	American Classic				10	10	
2018	GK US Classic		10	1st place, gold medalist(s)	20	13	2nd place, silver medalist(s)
2018	NBC US National Championships		6	3rd place, bronze medalist(s)	15	9	2nd place, silver medalist(s)
2018	Pan American Championships	1st place, gold medalist(s)		1st place, gold medalist(s)			1st place, gold medalist(s)
2018	Cottbus World Cup			2nd place, silver medalist(s)			5
2019
2019	Baku World Cup			1st place, gold medalist(s)			1st place, gold medalist(s)
2019	Doha World Cup			1st place, gold medalist(s)			1st place, gold medalist(s)
2019	GK US Classic		10	1st place, gold medalist(s)	15	17	2nd place, silver medalist(s)
2019	NBC US National Championships		7	2nd place, silver medalist(s)	12	13	2nd place, silver medalist(s)
2019	Worlds Team Selection Camp		5	2nd place, silver medalist(s)	9	9	4
2019	World Championships	1st place, gold medalist(s)		2nd place, silver medalist(s)			
2019	Swiss Cup	1st place, gold medalist(s)					
2020
2020	Melbourne World Cup			1st place, gold medalist(s)			1st place, gold medalist(s)
2021
2021	Winter Cup			2nd place, silver medalist(s)	6	9	
2021	GK US Classic				5	15	
2021	NBC US National Championships		6	4	8	11	8
2021	US Olympic Trials				16	11	
2021	Olympic Games		8	8			1st place, gold medalist(s)
2022
2022	OOFOS US National Championships		5	1st place, gold medalist(s)	9	7	2nd place, silver medalist(s)
2022	Paris World Challenge Cup			1st place, gold medalist(s)		2nd place, silver medalist(s)	
2022	World Championships	1st place, gold medalist(s)	6	1st place, gold medalist(s)			3rd place, bronze medalist(s)
2023
2023	U.S. Classic					9	
2023	U.S. National Championships		15	3rd place, bronze medalist(s)	19	25	11
2023	Swiss Cup	1st place, gold medalist(s)					
2024
2024	American Classic		1st place, gold medalist(s)	1st place, gold medalist(s)	5	2nd place, silver medalist(s)	1st place, gold medalist(s)
2024	U.S. Classic		4	1st place, gold medalist(s)	22	11	5
2024	U.S. National Championships		7	3rd place, bronze medalist(s)	8	17	4
2024	Olympic Trials		4	1st place, gold medalist(s)	8	6	2nd place, silver medalist(s)
2024	Olympic Games	1st place, gold medalist(s)		3rd place, bronze medalist(s)			
2026	American Classic		2nd place, silver medalist(s)	1st place, gold medalist(s)	4	5	1st place, gold medalist(s)
2026	U.S. Classic		2nd place, silver medalist(s)	1st place, gold medalist(s)	4	11	2nd place, silver medalist(s)
2026	U.S. National Championships		5	1st place, gold medalist(s)	6	11	3rd place, bronze medalist(s)

Competitive history of Jade Carey at the NCAA level
Year	Event	Team	AA	VT	UB	BB	FX
2022
2022	Pac-12 Championships	3rd place, bronze medalist(s)	1st place, gold medalist(s)	2nd place, silver medalist(s)	2nd place, silver medalist(s)	2nd place, silver medalist(s)	1st place, gold medalist(s)
2022	NCAA Championship		4	10	2nd place, silver medalist(s)	15	15
2023
2023	Pac-12 Championships	4	1st place, gold medalist(s)			1st place, gold medalist(s)	1st place, gold medalist(s)
2023	NCAA Championships					2nd place, silver medalist(s)	
2024
2024	Pac-12 Championships	5	2nd place, silver medalist(s)		1st place, gold medalist(s)		1st place, gold medalist(s)
2024	NCAA Championships		2nd place, silver medalist(s)	8		3rd place, bronze medalist(s)	2nd place, silver medalist(s)
2025
2025	NCAA Championships		4	14	13	3rd place, bronze medalist(s)	10

== Awards ==
Year	Award	Result	Ref
2019	AGF Trophy	Won	
2022	Pac-12 Gymnast of the Year	Won	
2022	Pac-12 Freshman of the Year (gymnastics)	Won	
2022	Honda Sports Award (gymnastics)	Nominated	
2022	USA Gymnastics Athlete of the Year	Won	
2023	Pac-12 Gymnast of the Year	Won	
2023	Honda Sports Award (gymnastics)	Nominated	
2024	Honda Sports Award (gymnastics)	Nominated	
2024	Oregon State University Female Athlete of the Year	Won	
2025	AAI Award	Won	
2025	Honda Sports Award (gymnastics)	Nominated	
2025	Pac-12 Overall Top Performer (gymnastics)	Won	
2025	Oregon Sports Awards Women's Division I Collegiate Athlete of the Year	Won	
