= Allan Bower =

American gymnast

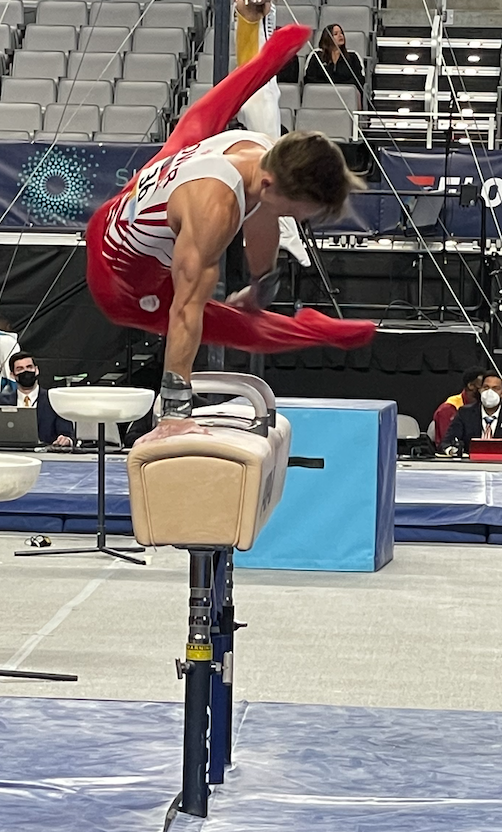
- Bower at the 2021 U.S. National Gymnastics Championships

Personal information
- Full name: Allan Carl Bower
- Born: March 7, 1995 (age 31) Lincoln, Nebraska, U.S.
- Height: 5 ft 8 in (173 cm)

Gymnastics career
- Discipline: Men's artistic gymnastics
- Country represented: United States (2015, 2017–2022)
- College team: Oklahoma Sooners (2014–2017)
- Gym: Xtreme Gymnastics; Desert Devils
- Head coach: Chris Sommer
- Former coach: Mark Williams
- Retired: c. 2021
Medal record
Men's artistic gymnastics
Representing United States
Event	1st	2nd	3rd
Swiss Cup	1	0	0
Total	1	0	0
Swiss Cup
Gold medal – first place	2019 Zürich	Team

Allan Bower (born March 7, 1995) is an American artistic gymnast. He was a member of the United States men's national artistic gymnastics team and was an alternate for the 2020 Summer Olympics.

== Early life and education ==
Bower was born on March 7, 1995, in Lincoln, Nebraska, to David and Jane Bower (née Clemons). His mother was a gymnast at the University of Nebraska–Lincoln and competed for the Nebraska Cornhuskers women's gymnastics team, where she became the 1990 Big Eight all-around champion. Bower grew up in Chandler, Arizona. He was enrolled in gymnastics as a youth and competed with Desert Devils before changing to Xtreme Gymnastics.

Bower graduated from Basha High School in 2013. At the University of Oklahoma, he majored in Biology and graduated in 2017.

== Gymnastics career ==
As a member of the United States men's national artistic gymnastics team, he represented the United States at the 2018 American Cup and the 2017 Cottbus World Cup. Domestically, he finished second in the all-around at the 2017 U.S. National Gymnastics Championships and third at the 2018 U.S. National Gymnastics Championships. Bower was a member of the Oklahoma Sooners men's gymnastics team from 2014 to 2017, winning three National team titles with the Sooners.

He competed at the 2020 United States Olympic trials and was named as an alternate for the 2020 Summer Olympics team. Ahead of the Olympics on July 12, 2021, Bower posted on Instagram regarding his gymnastics career, and he did not appear in any further competition. It was speculated would retire.

== Personal life ==
Bower has two younger siblings: Allison and Alex. Allison was a member of the Missouri Tigers gymnastics team.

He is married to Morgan Baulier and has his own personal training website with workouts from home: https://www.bowerpowerfit.com/
