= List of Olympic female artistic gymnasts for Spain =

Gymnastics events have been staged at the Olympic Games since 1896. Spanish female gymnasts have participated in every Summer Olympics since 1960, except for 1964 and 1968. A total of 48 female gymnasts have represented Spain. Spanish women have won one medal at the Olympics – the 2004 floor exercise bronze, which was won by Patricia Moreno.

== Gymnasts ==
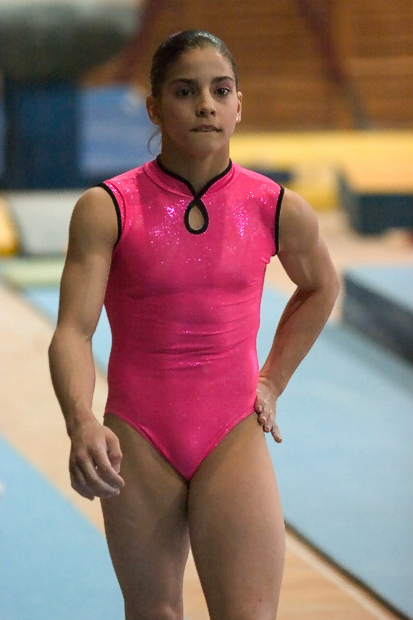
Laura Campos

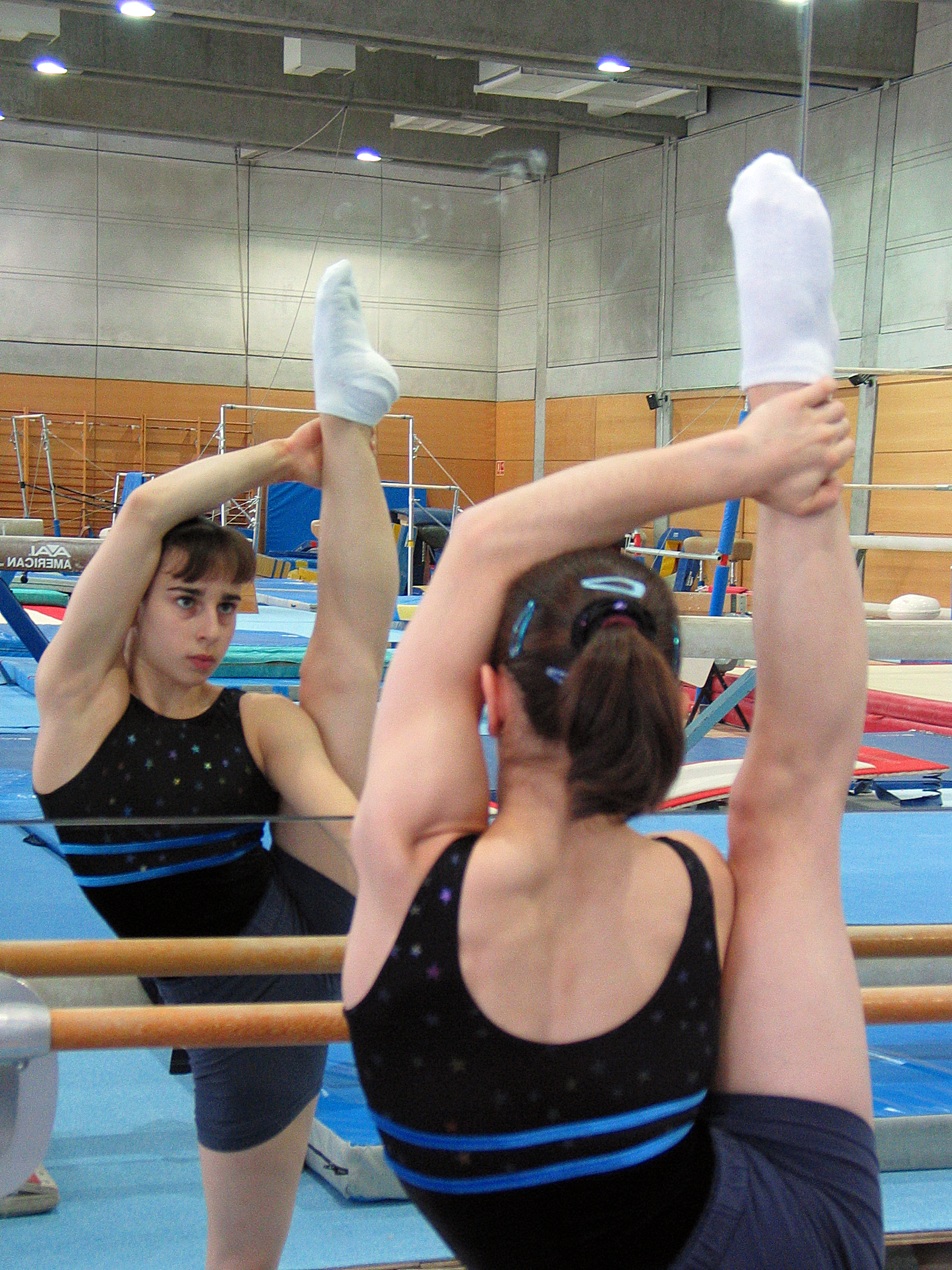
Lenika de Simone

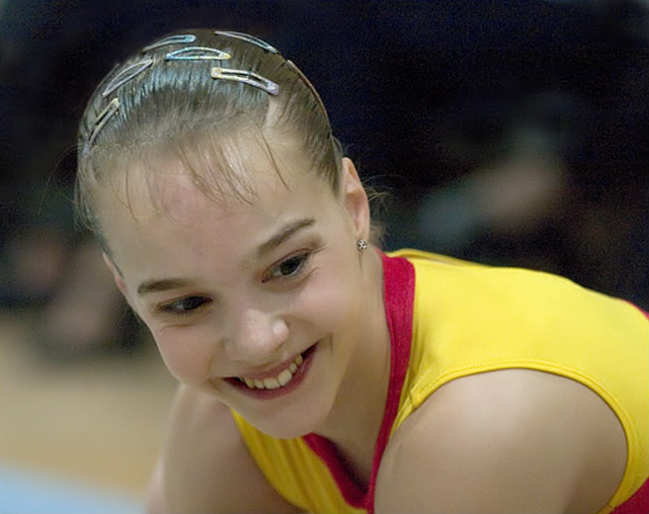
Elena Gómez

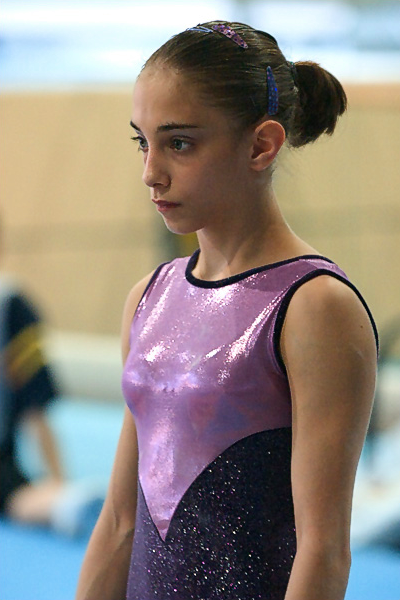
Patricia Moreno

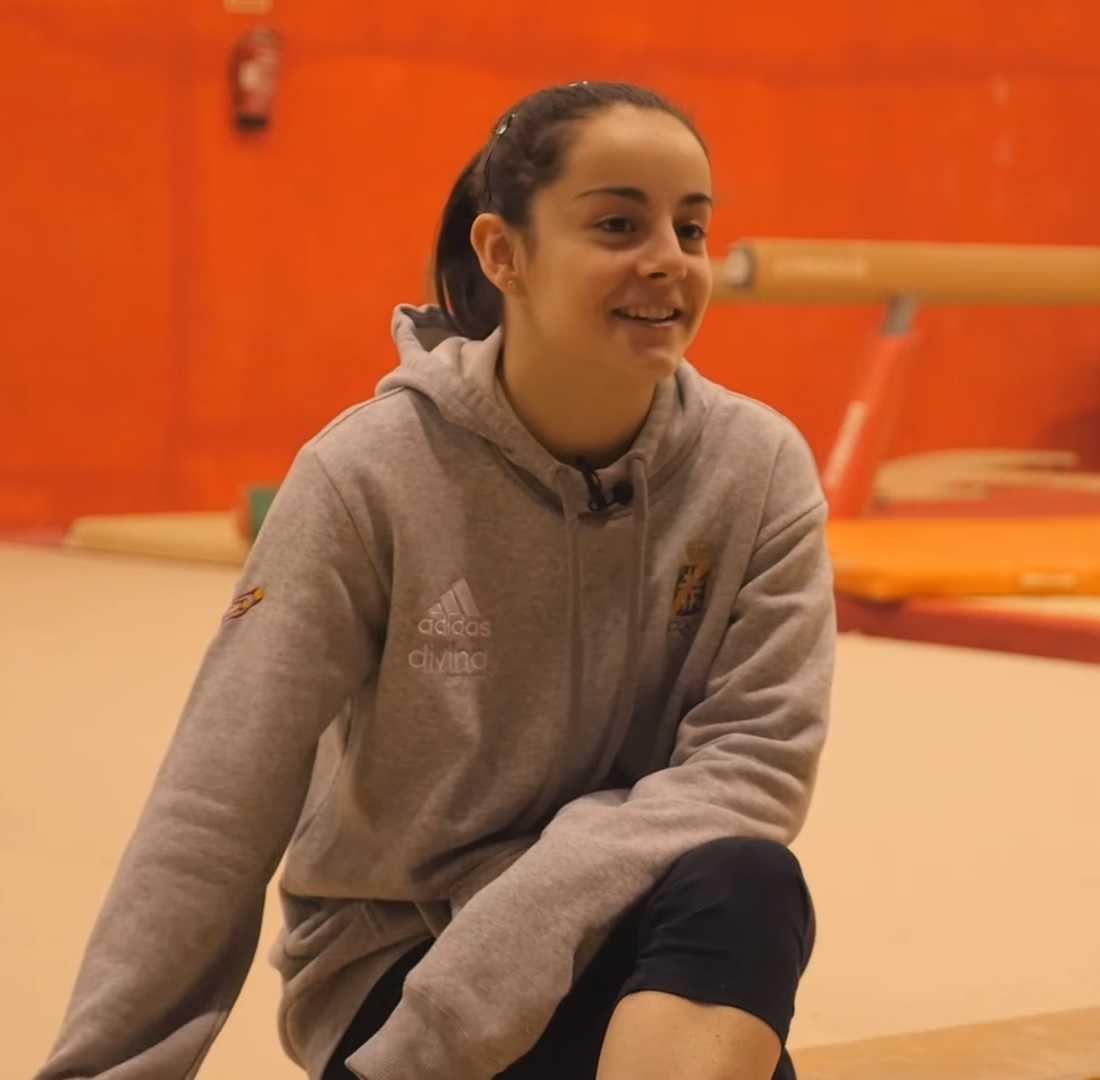
Ana Pérez

Gymnast	Years	Ref.
Elena Artamendi	1960	
Montserrat Artamendi	1960	
Marta Artigas	1984	
Rosa Balaguer	1960	
Laura Bechdejú	2020	
Nuria Belchi	1988	
Elisa Cabello	1976	
Laura Campos	2004, 2008	
Laura Casabuena	2024	
Lidia Castillejo	1988	
Verónica Castro	1996	
Marta Cusidó	2000	
Lenika De Simone	2008	
Margot Estévez	1984	
Alicia Fernández	1992	
María Luisa Fernández	1960	
Cristina Fraguas	1992	
Sonia Fraguas	1992	
Nuria García	1988	
Susana García	2000	
Tania Gener	2004	
María del Carmen González	1960	
Elena Gómez	2004	
Marina González	2020	
Manuela Hervás	1988	
Ana Maria Izurieta	2012	
Joana Juárez	1996	
Ana Manso	1984	
Eloisa Marcos	1976	
Mónica Martín	1996	
Irene Martínez	1980, 1984	
Laura Martínez	2000	
Silvia Martínez	1992	
Mónica Mesalles	2004	
Aurora Morata	1980	
Patricia Moreno	2004	
Paloma Moro	2000	
Sara Moro	2000, 2004	
Esther Moya	2000	
Laura Muñoz	1984, 1988	
Renata Müller	1960	
Virginia Navarro	1984	
Mercedes Pacheco	1996	
Gemma Paz	1996	
Ana Pérez	2016, 2024	
Alba Petisco	2020, 2024	
Diana Plaza	1996	
Roxana Popa	2020	
Ruth Rollán	1992	
Eva Rueda	1988, 1992	
Pepita Sánchez	1972	
Elisabeth Valle	1996	
Mercedes Vernetta	1976	
Gloria Viseras	1980	

== Medalists ==
Medal	Name	Year	Event
Bronze	Patricia Moreno	(Greece) 2004 Athens	Women's floor exercise
