= Spain women's national artistic gymnastics team =

National sports team

Spain
- Continental union: European Union of Gymnastics

Olympic Games
- Appearances: 8

World Championships

The Spain women's national artistic gymnastics team represents Spain in FIG international competitions.

== History ==
Spain made their Olympic debut in 1960, in which they placed 16th as a team. Only one Spanish woman has won an Olympic medal in gymnastics: Patricia Moreno won bronze on floor exercise at the 2004 Olympic Games.

== Team competition results ==
=== Olympic Games ===
Year	Position	Squad
1960	16th place	Elena Artamendi, Montserrat Artamendi, Rosa Balaguer, María del Carmen González, María Luisa Fernández, Renata Müller
1984	9th place	Laura Muñoz, Ana Manso, Marta Artigas, Irene Martínez, Virginia Navarro, Margot Estévez
1988	9th place	Laura Muñoz, Eva Rueda, Manuela Hervás, Lidia Castillejo, Nuria García, Nuria Belchi
1992	5th place	Cristina Fraguas, Sonia Fraguas, Alicia Fernández, Eva Rueda, Ruth Rollán, Silvia Martínez
1996	7th place	Mónica Martín, Joana Juárez, Mercedes Pacheco, Diana Plaza, Elisabeth Valle, Verónica Castro, Gemma Paz
2000	4th place	Esther Moya, Sara Moro, Laura Martinez, Susana Garcia, Marta Cusido, Paloma Moro
2004	5th place	Laura Campos, Tania Gener, Elena Gómez, Monica Mesalles, Patricia Moreno, Sara Moro
2020	12th place	Laura Bechdejú, Marina González, Alba Petisco, Roxana Popa

=== World Championships ===
Year	Position	Squad
2001	4th place	Sara Moro, Elena Gómez, Marta Cusidó, Esther Moya, Alba Planas, Ana Parera
2003	5th place	Elena Gómez, Mónica Mesalles, Patricia Moreno, Sara Moro, Tania Gener, Lenika de Simone
2006	8th place	Thais Escolar, Lenika de Simone, Laura Campos, Tania Gener, Patricia Moreno, Mélodie Pulgarín
2007	15th place	Mercedes Alcaide, Laura Campos, Patricia Moreno, Mélodie Pulgarín, Naomi Ruiz Walker, Lenika de Simone
2010	18th place	Ainhoa Carmona, Claudia Vila, Cristiana Mironescu, Cintia Rodríguez, Elena Zaldívar, Ana María Izurieta
2011	12th place	Ainhoa Carmona, Silvia Colussi-Pelaez, Beatriz Cuesta, Ana María Izurieta, Claudia Menendez, Maria Paula Vargas
2014	15th place	Ainhoa Carmona, Claudia Colom, Marta Costa, Ana Pérez, Roxana Popa, Cintia Rodríguez
2015	17th place	Claudia Colom, Nora Fernández, Ana Pérez, Roxana Popa, Natalia Ros, Maria Paula Vargas
2018	18th place	Laura Bechdeju, Helena Bonilla, Ana Pérez, Paula Raya, Cintia Rodriguez
2019	12th place	Marina González, Ana Pérez, Alba Petisco, Roxana Popa, Cintia Rodríguez
2022	17th place	Laura Casabuena, Emma Fernandez, Maia Llacer, Laia Masferrer, Paula Raya
2023	16th place	Laura Casabuena, Laia Font, Ana Pérez, Alba Petisco, Sara Pinilla
2026	13th place	Laura Casabuena, Marina Escuerdo, Laia Font, Aitana Pacheco, Alba Petisco

== Senior roster ==
Name	Birth date and age	Hometown
Laura Casabuena	26 December 2005 (age 20)	Alcoy
Yaama Diedhiou	2009	Keur Massar, Senegal
Marina Escudero	7 November 2008 (age 18)	Sant Cugat del Vallès
Laia Font	20 February 2007 (age 19)	Gironella
Maia Llacer	4 April 2004 (age 22)	Alcoy
Susana Martínez	2010	Castelldefels
Laia Masferrer	11 December 2005 (age 20)	Madrid
Aitana Pacheco	2009	Madrid
Ana Pérez	14 December 1997 (age 28)	Sevilla
Alba Petisco	1 February 2003 (age 23)	Villarino de los Aires
Elia Ribas	3 July 2009 (age 17)	Girona
Mar Royo	2009	Barcelona
Elvira Ruiz-Fornells	2009	Madrid
Carlota Salas	2006	Seville
Ainara Sautua	20 January 2005 (age 21)	Madrid

== Most decorated gymnasts ==
This list includes all Spanish female artistic gymnasts who have won a medal at the Olympic Games or the World Artistic Gymnastics Championships.

Rank	Gymnast	Team	AA	VT	UB	BB	FX	Olympic Total	World Total	Total
1	Elena Gómez						2002; 2003	0	2	2
2	Patricia Moreno						2004	1	0	1

== See also ==
- List of Olympic female artistic gymnasts for Spain
