= Nora Fernández =

Spanish artistic gymnast

- Full name: Nora Fernández Iniesta
- Born: 19 October 1999 (age 26) Girona, Catalonia, Spain

Gymnastics career
- Discipline: Women's artistic gymnastics
- Country represented: Spain
- Club: Salt Gymnastic Club
- Head coach: Lucia Guisado
Medal record
Women's artistic gymnastics
Representing Spain
Mediterranean Games
| Bronze medal – third place | 2018 Tarragona | Team |

Nora Fernández Iniesta (Note: In this Spanish name, the first or paternal surname is Fernández and the second or maternal family name is Iniesta.) (born 19 October 1999) is a Spanish former artistic gymnast. She was a member of the Spanish team that won the bronze medal at the 2018 Mediterranean Games, and she competed at the 2015 and 2017 World Championships.

== Gymnastics career ==
Fernández competed at the 2015 European Championships, but she did not qualify for any event finals. At the Spanish Championships, she won the bronze medal in the all-around behind Ana Pérez and Maria Paula Vargas. She was then selected to compete at the World Championships with Pérez, Paula Vargas, Claudia Colom, Roxana Popa, and Natalia Ros, and they finished seventeenth in the qualification round.

At the 2016 Cottbus World Challenge Cup, Fernández finished fifth on the uneven bars and sixth on the balance beam. Then at the Spanish Cup, she finished third in the all-around behind Ana Pérez and Claudia Colom. She competed at the 2016 European Championships, and the Spanish team finished tenth. She then finished fourth in the all-around at the 2016 Spanish Championships.

Fernández won the gold medal in the all-around at the 2017 Spanish Cup. She then competed at the 2017 European Championships, but she did not qualify for any finals. She competed at the World Championships on the balance beam and floor exercise, but she did not qualify for either event final. At the Cottbus World Cup, she finished sixth on the uneven bars.

Fernández competed at the 2018 Mediterranean Games with Paula Raya, Helena Bonilla, Ana Pérez, and Cintia Rodriguez, and they won the team bronze medal behind Italy and France.
