= Claudia Colom =

Spanish artistic gymnast

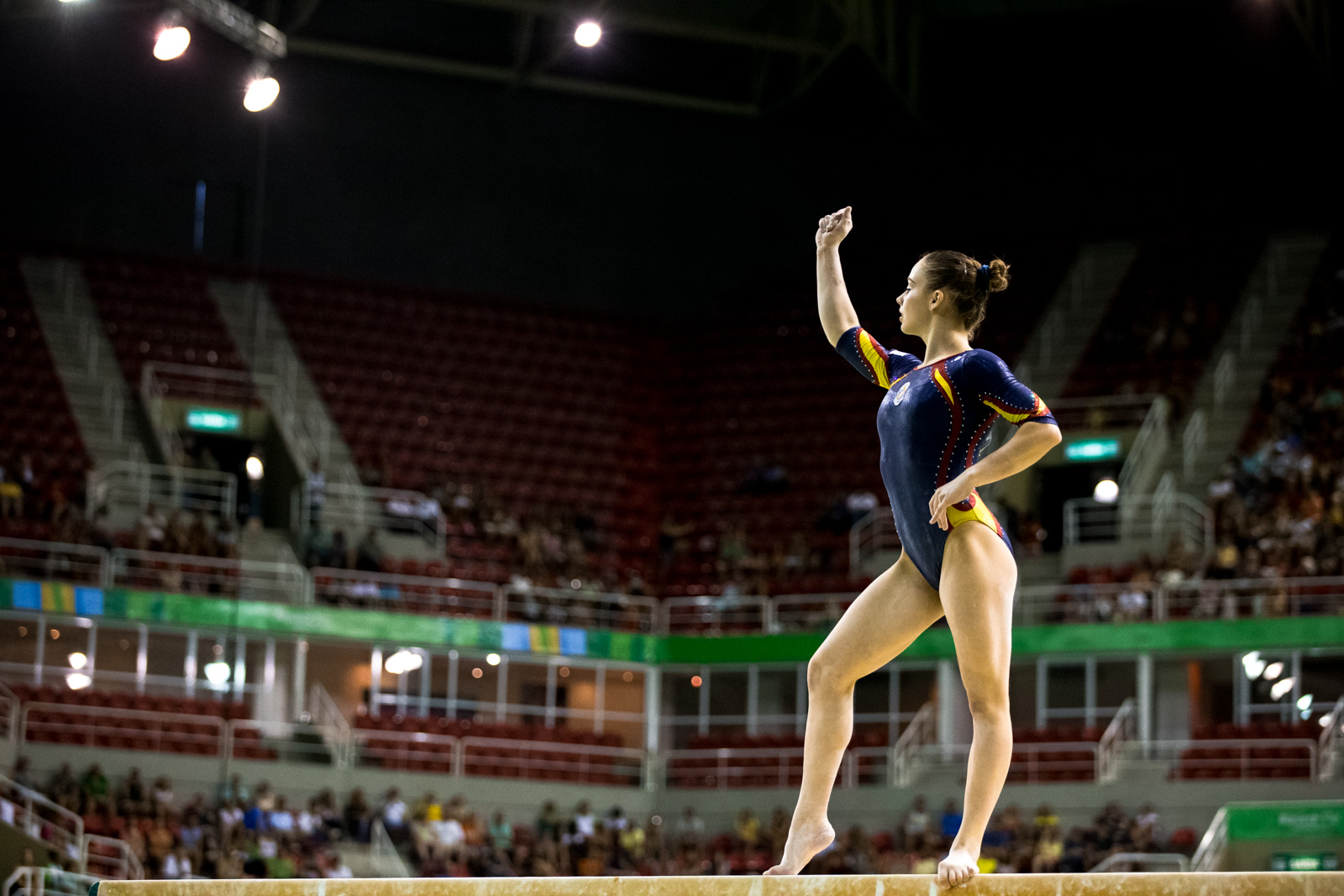
- Colom on the balance beam at the 2016 Gymnastics Olympic Test Event

Personal information
- Full name: Claudia Colom Martín
- Born: 26 September 1998 (age 27) Palma, Spain

Gymnastics career
- Discipline: Women's artistic gymnastics
- Country represented: Spain
- Club: Xelska
- Head coach: Pedro Mir
- Retired: 2021

Claudia Colom Martín (Note: In this Spanish name, the first or paternal surname is Colom and the second or maternal family name is Martín.) (born 26 September 1998) is a Spanish former artistic gymnast. She is the 2016 Spanish all-around champion, and she competed at the 2014, 2015, and 2017 World Championships.

== Gymnastics career ==
=== Junior ===
Colom competed at the 2012 Junior European Championships, and the Spanish team finished eleventh in the qualification round. She then competed at the 2013 European Youth Summer Olympic Festival with Natalia Ros and Laura Gamell, and they finished tenth as a team. At the 2013 Elite Gym Massilia, she finished fifteenth in the all-around with a total score of 50.500.

=== Senior ===
Colom made her senior international debut at the 2014 WOGA Classic, and she tied with Lia Top for ninth place in the all-around. She had the second-highest score on the floor exercise- 12.950. She then competed at the 2014 European Championships with Roxana Popa, Cintia Rodríguez, Ana Pérez, and Laura Gamell, and they finished sixth in the team final. At the 2014 World Championships, Colom and the Spanish team finished fifteenth in the qualification round.

At the 2015 Anadia World Cup, Colom finished seventh on the uneven bars and the balance beam. She was selected to represent Spain at the 2015 European Games alongside Ainhoa Carmona and Ana Pérez, and they finished twelfth in the team competition. She then competed at the 2015 World Championships alongside Nora Fernández, Ana Pérez, Roxana Popa, Natalia Ros, and Maria Paula Vargas, and they finished seventeenth in the qualification round.

Colom competed at the 2016 Olympic Test Event and placed twenty-eighth in the all-around with a total score of 53.732. Spain had to choose between Colom and Ana Pérez for their one Olympic spot, and ultimately, Pérez was chosen for the Olympic Games. She competed at the 2016 European Championships, and the Spanish team finished tenth. She then won the all-around gold medal at the 2016 Spanish Championships.

Colom finished second in the all-around at the 2017 Spanish Championships behind Ana Pérez. She then finished seventh on the uneven bars at the 2017 Szombathely World Cup. At the 2017 World Championships, she only competed on the uneven bars, but she did not qualify for the event final.

Colom retired in 2021 due to injuries, and she began coaching.
