= Laura Bechdejú =

Spanish artistic gymnast

- Full name: Laura Bechdejú Coll
- Born: 9 May 2000 (age 26) Girona, Catalonia, Spain
- Height: 1.58 m (5 ft 2 in)

Gymnastics career
- Discipline: Women's artistic gymnastics
- Country represented: Spain; (2014–2022)
- Club: Salt Gimnastic Club
- Head coach: Lucia Guisado

Laura Bechdejú Coll (born 9 May 2000) is a Spanish artistic gymnast. She represented Spain at the 2020 Summer Olympics and at the 2018 World Championships. She is a 2019 European all-around finalist and a four-time medalist at the Spanish Championships.

== Career ==
=== Junior ===
Bechdejú made her elite debut at the 2014 Spanish Cup held in Guadalajara, Spain where she placed nineteenth in the all-around and seventh with her club team. At her next competition, the Spanish Championships, she placed ninth in the junior all-around and won the silver medal on vault. She then made her international debut at the 2014 Elite Gym Massilia in Marseille, France where she placed thirteenth with her team and forty-ninth in the all-around.

Bechdejú began her 2015 season at the FIT Challenge in Ghent, Belgium placing sixth with the Spanish team and twenty-fifth in the all-around. Then at the Spanish Championships, she finished fourth in the all-around and became the junior national champion on vault. Her final junior competition was the 2015 Top Gym Tournament in Charleroi, Belgium where she placed thirteenth all-around. In the event finals, she finished sixth on vault and floor exercise, eleventh on uneven bars, and fourth on balance beam.

=== Senior ===
Bechdejú became age-eligible for senior competitions in 2016. She made her senior international debut at the Cottbus World Challenge Cup but did not qualify for any event finals, and this was her only competition of the year.

At the 2017 Spanish Cup, Bechdejú won team gold with her club and placed fifth in the all-around. She then competed at the FIT Challenge where she placed seventeenth in the all-around and fourth in the senior and junior combined team event. She won the silver medal on the uneven bars at the Spanish Championships and placed fifth all-around. She ended the season at the Cottbus World Cup and placed seventh on the floor exercise.

Bechdejú won the all-around gold, team, balance beam, and floor exercise silver, and vault and uneven bars bronze at the 2018 1st Spanish League. She then competed at the DTB Pokal Team Challenge in Stuttgart where the Spanish team finished sixth. Then at the 2nd Spanish League, she won another all-around gold and her club won a second team silver. She was then selected to compete at the 2018 World Championships in Doha alongside Helena Bonilla, Ana Pérez, Paula Raya, and Cintia Rodriguez, and they placed eighteenth in the qualification round.

At the 2019 1st Spanish League, Bechdejú finished fifth with her club team and in the all-around. She then competed at the DTB Team Challenge in Stuttgart where the Spanish team placed eighth. Then at the 2nd Spanish League, she won the silver medal in the all-around behind Cintia Rodriguez and helped her club place fourth. She was selected to compete at the 2019 European Championships in Szczecin and finished sixteenth in the all-around final with a total score of 50.599. Then at the 3rd Spanish League, she won the all-around bronze medal behind Cintia Rodriguez and Alba Petisco. At the Spanish League Finals, she won the all-around gold medal. She then won another all-around bronze medal at the Spanish Championships and also won balance beam and floor exercise bronze. In August, she injured the orbital cavity in her left eye and had surgery, causing her to miss the rest of the 2019 season including the World Championships.

Bechdejú returned to competition in February 2020 at the 2nd Spanish League and helped her club team place fourth. She did not compete again until December due to the COVID-19 pandemic in Spain at the Spanish Championships where she only competed on the uneven bars and finished fourth.

Bechdejú competed at the 2021 FIT Challenge where she helped the Spanish team place fifth, and she finished thirteenth in the all-around with a total score of 51.666. She was then selected to represent Spain at the 2020 Summer Olympics alongside Marina González, Alba Petisco and Roxana Popa. The team finished twelfth in qualifications and did not reach the team final.

== Competitive history ==
Year	Event	Team	AA	VT	UB	BB	FX
Junior
2014	Spanish Cup	7	19	8	26	21	20
2014	Spanish Championships		9	2nd place, silver medalist(s)	10	8	10
2014	Élite Gym Massilia	13	49				
2015	FIT Challenge	6	25				
2015	Spanish Championships		4	1st place, gold medalist(s)	8	8	4
2015	Top Gym Tournament		13	6	11	4	6
Senior
2017	Spanish Cup	1st place, gold medalist(s)	5				
2017	FIT Challenge	4	17				
2017	Spanish Championships		5	5	2nd place, silver medalist(s)	8	6
2017	Cottbus World Cup						7
2018	1st Spanish League	2nd place, silver medalist(s)	1st place, gold medalist(s)	3rd place, bronze medalist(s)	3rd place, bronze medalist(s)	2nd place, silver medalist(s)	2nd place, silver medalist(s)
2018	DTB Team Challenge	6					
2018	2nd Spanish League	2nd place, silver medalist(s)	1st place, gold medalist(s)		3rd place, bronze medalist(s)		1st place, gold medalist(s)
2018	World Championships	18					
2018	Joaquin Blume Memorial		6				
2019	1st Spanish League	5	5				2nd place, silver medalist(s)
2019	DTB Team Challenge	8	15				
2019	2nd Spanish League	4	2nd place, silver medalist(s)		1st place, gold medalist(s)		1st place, gold medalist(s)
2019	European Championships		16				
2019	3rd Spanish League		3rd place, bronze medalist(s)	3rd place, bronze medalist(s)			
2019	Spanish League Finals		1st place, gold medalist(s)	1st place, gold medalist(s)	1st place, gold medalist(s)		1st place, gold medalist(s)
2019	Spanish Championships		3rd place, bronze medalist(s)			3rd place, bronze medalist(s)	3rd place, bronze medalist(s)
2020	2nd Spanish League	4		1st place, gold medalist(s)	3rd place, bronze medalist(s)		
2020	Spanish Championships				4		
2021	FIT Challenge	5	13				
2021	Olympic Games	12					
