= Gymnastics at the 2020 Summer Olympics – Women's artistic qualification =

Qualification for women's artistic gymnastics competitions at the 2020 Summer Olympics was held at the Ariake Gymnastics Centre on 25 July 2021. The results of the qualification determined the qualifiers to the finals: 8 teams in the team final, 24 gymnasts in the individual all-around final, and 8 gymnasts in each of 4 apparatus finals. The competition was divided into five subdivisions.

== Subdivisions ==
Gymnasts from nations taking part in the team all-around event were grouped together while the remaining gymnasts were grouped into one of eight mixed groups. The groups were divided into the five subdivisions after a draw held by the Fédération Internationale de Gymnastique. The groups rotated through each of the four apparatuses together.

- ^{ind}: Individual gymnast

	Vault (gymnastics)	Uneven bars	Balance beam	Floor (gymnastics)
Subdivision 1 (10:00)	Italy Lara Mori (ITA) ^{ind}	Mixed Group 3 Diana Varinska (UKR); Ana Đerek (CRO); Ting Hua-tien (TPE); Marcia Vidiaux (CUB); Marina Nekrasova (AZE)	Japan Urara Ashikawa (JPN) ^{ind}	Mixed Group 6 Abigail Magistrati (ARG); Pranati Nayak (IND); Tan Sze En (SIN); Raegan Rutty (CAY); Aneta Holasová (CZE)
Subdivision 2 (11:55)	China Fan Yilin (CHN) ^{ind} Guan Chenchen (CHN) ^{ind}	Great Britain	Mixed Group 7 Naveen Daries (RSA); Caitlin Rooskrantz (RSA); Megan Ryan (IRL); Elisa Hämmerle (AUT); Milka Gehani (SRI)	ROC Elena Gerasimova (ROC) ^{ind} Anastasia Ilyankova (ROC) ^{ind}
Subdivision 3 (15:10)	Mixed Group 8 Danusia Francis (JAM); Ariana Orrego (PER); Gabriela Sasnal (POL); Simona Castro (CHI); Nazlı Savranbaşı (TUR)	Netherlands	Mixed Group 1 Georgia Godwin (AUS); Emily Whitehead (AUS); Maria Holbură (ROU); Larisa Iordache (ROU); Filipa Martins (POR); Barbora Mokošová (SVK)	United States Jade Carey (USA) ^{ind} MyKayla Skinner (USA) ^{ind}
Subdivision 4 (17:05)	Canada	Mixed Group 4 Lihie Raz (ISR); Giulia Steingruber (SUI); Oksana Chusovitina (UZB); Luciana Alvarado (CRC); Farah Ann Abdul Hadi (MAS)	France	Spain
Subdivision 5 (20:20)	Mixed Group 5 Lee Yun-seo (KOR); Yeo Seo-jeong (KOR); Julie Erichsen (NOR); Alexa Moreno (MEX); Zsófia Kovács (HUN)	Germany	Mixed Group 2 Zeina Ibrahim (EGY); Mandy Mohamed (EGY); Rebeca Andrade (BRA); Flávia Saraiva (BRA); Jonna Adlerteg (SWE); Hanna Traukova (BLR)	Belgium

== Results ==
Team/Gymnast	Vault (gymnastics)		Uneven bars		Balance beam		Floor (gymnastics)		Total (All-around)	
Team/Gymnast	Score (Note: Gymnasts who wanted to qualify for the vault final performed a second vault, with the average of the two counting for event final qualification. Only the first vault counted for individual and team all-around qualification.)	Rank	Score	Rank	Score	Rank	Score	Rank	Score	Rank
Teams
ROC	43.832	2	44.565	1	41.599	2	41.633	1	171.629	1
Lilia Akhaimova (ROC)	14.766/14.633; Avg: 14.699	7	12.900	49	12.266	59T	13.633	11	53.565	28
Viktoria Listunova (ROC)	14.300	–	14.766	6	13.866	13	14.000	6	56.932	6
Angelina Melnikova (ROC)	14.466/14.766; Avg: 14.616	9	14.933	4	13.733	17	14.000	7	57.132	4
Vladislava Urazova (ROC)	14.600	–	14.866	5	14.000	8	13.633	10	57.099	5
United States	44.199	1	43.866	2	41.332	3	41.165	2	170.562	2
Simone Biles (USA)	14.966/15.400; Avg: 15.183	1	14.566	10	14.066	7	14.133	2	57.731	1
Jordan Chiles (USA)	14.700	–	12.866	52	11.566	78	13.566	13	52.698	40
Sunisa Lee (USA)	14.333	–	15.200	2	14.200	3	13.433	18	57.166	3
Grace McCallum (USA)	14.533	–	14.100	22	13.066	32	13.466	16	55.165	13
China	42.366	8	42.633	4	42.399	1	39.465	6	166.863	3
Lu Yufei (CHN)	13.600	–	14.700	7T	14.100	5	12.666	48T	55.066	14
Ou Yushan (CHN)	13.633	–	13.500	35	13.933	11	–	–	–	–
Tang Xijing (CHN)	14.300	–	14.433	13	14.333	2	13.366	20	56.432	8
Zhang Jin (CHN)	14.433	–	13.100	42	13.966	10	13.433	17	54.932	15
France	43.665	3	42.198	6	39.899	6	38.799	11	164.561	4
Marine Boyer (FRA)	13.733	–	10.400	84	13.466	22	12.733	44	50.332	60
Mélanie de Jesus dos Santos (FRA)	14.466	–	14.566	11	13.233	26	13.166	25	55.431	10
Aline Friess (FRA)	14.966	–	13.666	31T	12.500	51	12.500	56	53.632	25
Carolann Héduit (FRA)	14.233	–	13.966	25	13.200	28	12.900	34	54.299	18
Belgium	41.066	12	43.099	3	40.465	4	39.265	7	163.895	5
Maellyse Brassart (BEL)	13.766	–	13.366	36T	13.033	33	12.766	39	52.931	35
Nina Derwael (BEL)	13.900	–	15.366	1	13.766	15	13.566	12	56.598	7
Lisa Vaelen (BEL)	13.000	–	14.100	23	12.500	52T	12.766	40	52.366	42
Jutta Verkest (BEL)	13.400	–	13.633	33	13.666	19	12.933	31T	53.632	26
Great Britain	43.199	5	40.699	8	39.199	9	40.599	3T	163.396 (Note: Great Britain incurred a neutral deduction of 0.300 points for Jennifer Gadirova exceeding the touch warm-up time on vault.)	6
Jennifer Gadirova (GBR)	14.533	–	13.066	43T	13.300	24	13.800	9	54.699	17
Jessica Gadirova (GBR)	14.500/14.200; Avg: 14.350	13	13.800	29	12.866	39	14.033	5	55.199	12
Alice Kinsella (GBR)	14.166	–	12.633	57	12.100	63	12.766	41	51.665	48
Amelie Morgan (GBR)	13.858	–	13.833	28	13.033	34	12.466	57	53.190	33
Italy	42.766	6	41.866	7	38.799	10	39.899	5	163.330	7
Alice D'Amato (ITA)	14.333	–	14.233	18	12.600	48	13.033	28	54.199	20
Asia D'Amato (ITA)	14.233	–	13.933	26	13.133	29T	11.833	76	53.132	34
Vanessa Ferrari (ITA)	14.200	–	–	–	12.500	52T	14.166	1	–	–
Martina Maggio (ITA)	14.100	–	13.700	30	13.066	31	12.700	45	53.566	27
Japan	42.432	7	39.632	11	39.999	5	40.599	3T	162.662	8
Hitomi Hatakeda (JPN)	12.266	–	14.133	21	13.000	35	13.333	22	52.732	39
Yuna Hiraiwa (JPN)	13.733	–	11.700	71	13.533	20	12.666	47	51.632	49
Mai Murakami (JPN)	14.433/14.500; Avg: 14.466	11	12.133	64	13.466	21	13.933	8	53.965	23
Aiko Sugihara (JPN)	14.266	–	13.366	36T	11.566	77	13.333	21	52.531	41
Germany	41.699	10	42.632	5	37.965	11	38.866	10	161.162	9
Kim Bui (GER)	13.466	–	14.066	24	12.666	44	13.200	24	53.398	31
Pauline Schäfer-Betz (GER)	13.933	–	11.933	66	12.966	36	12.733	42	51.565	50
Elisabeth Seitz (GER)	14.266	–	14.700	7T	12.333	56	12.933	31T	54.232	19
Sarah Voss (GER)	13.500	–	13.866	27	12.266	59T	12.600	50	52.232	45
Canada	43.632	4	38.700	12	39.466	8	39.166	8	160.964	10
Ellie Black (CAN)	14.533/14.300; Avg: 14.416	12	12.800	54	14.100	6	12.266	63	53.699	24
Brooklyn Moors (CAN)	14.133	–	13.000	46	13.300	25	13.533	15	53.966	22
Shallon Olsen (CAN)	14.966/14.433; Avg: 14.699	6	11.900	68	12.066	66	13.033	29	51.965	46
Ava Stewart (CAN)	12.933	–	12.900	50	12.000	67	12.600	51	50.433	58
Netherlands	42.133	9	39.666	10	39.565	7	38.899	9	160.263	11
Eythora Thorsdottir (NED)	14.433	–	13.000	47	12.333	57	13.133	27	52.899	36
Vera van Pol (NED)	14.100	–	13.133	41	11.600	75	12.900	33	51.733	47
Lieke Wevers (NED)	13.600	–	13.533	34	13.366	23	12.866	35	53.365	32
Sanne Wevers (NED)	–	–	11.733	69	13.866	14	–	–	–	–
Spain	41.299	11	39.966	9	37.898	12	37.965	12	157.128	12
Laura Bechdejú (ESP)	13.533	–	12.700	56	12.666	45T	12.300	62	51.199	53
Marina González (ESP)	13.233	–	11.033	81	12.366	55	12.866	36	49.498	63
Alba Petisco (ESP)	13.466	–	12.866	51	11.700	73	12.566	53	50.598	57
Roxana Popa (ESP)	14.300	–	14.400	15	12.866	40	12.533	55	54.099	21
Individuals
Rebeca Andrade (BRA)	15.400/14.800; Avg: 15.100	3	14.200	19	13.733	18	14.066	4	57.399	2
Jade Carey (USA)	15.166/15.166; Avg: 15.166	2	14.133	20	12.866	41	14.100	3	56.265	9
MyKayla Skinner (USA)	14.933/14.800; Avg: 14.866	4	13.666	31T	13.233	27	13.566	14	55.398	11
Zsófia Kovács (HUN)	14.500	–	14.433	14	13.133	29T	12.666	48T	54.732	16
Lee Yun-seo (KOR)	13.400	–	14.333	16	12.841	42	12.966	30	53.540	29
Giulia Steingruber (SUI)	14.833/14.300; Avg: 14.566	10	12.800	53	12.600	47	13.300	23	53.533	30
Georgia Godwin (AUS)	13.766	–	13.033	45	12.900	38	13.166	26	52.865	37
Elena Gerasimova (ROC)	13.466	–	13.233	40	13.766	16	12.333	60T	52.798	38
Filipa Martins (POR)	13.466	–	14.300	17	11.866	69	12.666	46	52.298	43
Emily Whitehead (AUS)	14.000	–	13.066	43T	12.666	45T	12.566	52	52.298	44
Luciana Alvarado (CRC)	13.433	–	12.741	55	12.966	37	12.166	66	51.306	51
Barbora Mokošová (SVK)	13.333	–	13.333	38	11.700	72	12.833	37	51.199	52
Gabriela Sasnal (POL)	13.600/13.366; Avg: 13.483	17	12.966	48	12.433	54	11.933	73	50.932	54
Alexa Moreno (MEX)	14.833/14.433; Avg: 14.633	8	12.566	59	11.066	83	12.333	60T	50.798	55
Yeo Seo-jeong (KOR)	15.000/14.600; Avg: 14.800	5	12.500	61	10.583	87	12.566	54	50.649	56
Lihie Raz (ISR)	14.233/13.566; Avg: 13.899	15	11.700	70	12.066	64	12.400	59	50.399	59
Caitlin Rooskrantz (RSA)	12.800	–	13.300	39	12.200	61	11.633	79	49.933	61
Diana Varinska (UKR)	12.633	–	11.633	72	12.566	49	12.733	43	49.565	62
Zeina Ibrahim (EGY)	13.200	–	12.500	60	11.866	70	11.700	78	49.266	64
Maria Holbură (ROU)	13.166	–	11.100	80	12.700	43	12.200	65	49.166	65
Elisa Hämmerle (AUT)	12.533	–	12.600	58	11.800	71	12.000	70	48.933	66
Mandy Mohamed (EGY)	13.233	–	11.600	73	11.200	82	12.833	38	48.866	67
Farah Ann Abdul Hadi (MAS)	13.166	–	11.600	74	11.566	76	12.233	64	48.565	68
Abigail Magistrati (ARG)	13.366	–	11.533	79	11.233	81	12.133	67	48.265	69
Marina Nekrasova (AZE)	13.133/12.200; Avg: 12.666	19	10.833	83	12.266	58	12.000	71	48.232	70
Nazlı Savranbaşı (TUR)	12.900	–	11.933	67	11.033	85	11.933	74	47.799	71
Megan Ryan (IRL)	13.200	–	11.533	76	10.466	88	12.000	72	47.199	72
Aneta Holasová (CZE)	12.566	–	11.533	77	11.933	68	11.100	80	47.132	73
Ariana Orrego (PER)	13.433	–	9.466	85	12.066	65	12.066	68	47.031	74
Simona Castro (CHI)	13.200	–	11.533	78	11.433	79	10.233	85	46.399	75
Naveen Daries (RSA)	13.300/12.666; Avg: 12.983	18	12.366	62	8.933	90	11.766	77	46.365	76
Hanna Traukova (BLR)	12.600	–	11.966	65	10.833	86	10.833	81	46.232	77
Milka Gehani (SRI)	13.366	–	10.866	82	11.266	80	10.300	84	45.798	78
Pranati Nayak (IND)	13.466	–	9.033	86	9.433	89	10.633	83	42.565	79
Raegan Rutty (CAY)	12.133	–	8.566	87	8.283	91	10.633	82	39.615	80
Flávia Saraiva (BRA)	–	–	–	–	13.966	9	12.066	69	–	–
Lara Mori (ITA)	–	–	–	–	12.133	62	13.400	19	–	–
Ting Hua-tien (TPE)	–	–	12.233	63	12.566	50	–	–	–	–
Ana Đerek (CRO)	–	–	–	–	11.633	74	12.433	58	–	–
Tan Sze En (SGP)	–	–	–	–	11.033	84	11.833	75	–	–
Anastasia Ilyankova (ROC)	–	–	14.966	3	–	–	–	–	–	–
Guan Chenchen (CHN)	–	–	–	–	14.933	1	–	–	–	–
Fan Yilin (CHN)	–	–	14.600	9	–	–	–	–	–	–
Jonna Adlerteg (SWE)	–	–	14.533	12	–	–	–	–	–	–
Oksana Chusovitina (UZB)	14.500/13.833; Avg: 14.166	14	–	–	–	–	–	–	–	–
Marcia Vidiaux (CUB)	14.166/12.833; Avg: 13.499	16	–	–	–	–	–	–	–	–
Larisa Iordache (ROU)	–	–	–	–	14.133	4	–	–	–	–
Urara Ashikawa (JPN)	–	–	–	–	13.900	12	–	–	–	–
Julie Erichsen (NOR)	–	–	11.566	75	–	–	–	–	–	–
Danusia Francis (JAM)	–	–	3.033	88	–	–	–	–	–	–

=== Team ===
Rank	Team	Vault (gymnastics)	Uneven bars	Balance beam	Floor (gymnastics)	Total	Qual.
1	ROC	43.832 (2)	44.565 (1)	41.599 (2)	41.633 (1)	171.629	Q
1	Lilia Akhaimova (ROC)	14.766	12.900	12.266	13.633	171.629	Q
1	Viktoria Listunova (ROC)	14.300	14.766	13.866	14.000	171.629	Q
1	Angelina Melnikova (ROC)	14.466	14.933	13.733	14.000	171.629	Q
1	Vladislava Urazova (ROC)	14.600	14.866	14.000	13.633	171.629	Q
2	United States	44.199 (1)	43.866 (2)	41.332 (3)	41.165 (2)	170.562	Q
2	Simone Biles (USA)	14.966	14.566	14.066	14.133	170.562	Q
2	Jordan Chiles (USA)	14.700	12.866	11.566	13.566	170.562	Q
2	Sunisa Lee (USA)	14.333	15.200	14.200	13.433	170.562	Q
2	Grace McCallum (USA)	14.533	14.100	13.066	13.466	170.562	Q
3	China	42.366 (8)	42.633 (4)	42.399 (1)	39.465 (6)	166.863	Q
3	Lu Yufei (CHN)	13.600	14.700	14.100	12.666	166.863	Q
3	Ou Yushan (CHN)	13.633	13.500	13.933	–	166.863	Q
3	Tang Xijing (CHN)	14.300	14.433	14.333	13.366	166.863	Q
3	Zhang Jin (CHN)	14.433	13.100	13.966	13.433	166.863	Q
4	France	43.665 (3)	42.198 (6)	39.899 (6)	38.799 (11)	164.561	Q
4	Marine Boyer (FRA)	13.733	10.400	13.466	12.733	164.561	Q
4	Mélanie de Jesus dos Santos (FRA)	14.466	14.566	13.233	13.166	164.561	Q
4	Aline Friess (FRA)	14.966	13.666	12.500	12.500	164.561	Q
4	Carolann Héduit (FRA)	14.233	13.966	13.200	12.900	164.561	Q
5	Belgium	41.066 (12)	43.099 (3)	40.465 (4)	39.265 (7)	163.895	Q
5	Maellyse Brassart (BEL)	13.766	13.366	13.033	12.766	163.895	Q
5	Nina Derwael (BEL)	13.900	15.366	13.766	13.566	163.895	Q
5	Lisa Vaelen (BEL)	13.000	14.100	12.500	12.766	163.895	Q
5	Jutta Verkest (BEL)	13.400	13.633	13.666	12.933	163.895	Q
6	Great Britain	43.199 (5)	40.699 (8)	39.199 (9)	40.599 (3T)	163.396	Q
6	Jennifer Gadirova (GBR)	14.533	13.066	13.300	13.800	163.396	Q
6	Jessica Gadirova (GBR)	14.500	13.800	12.866	14.033	163.396	Q
6	Alice Kinsella (GBR)	14.166	12.633	12.100	12.766	163.396	Q
6	Amelie Morgan (GBR)	13.858	13.833	13.033	12.466	163.396	Q
7	Italy	42.766 (6)	41.866 (7)	38.799 (10)	39.899 (5)	163.330	Q
7	Alice D'Amato (ITA)	14.333	14.233	12.600	13.033	163.330	Q
7	Asia D'Amato (ITA)	14.233	13.933	13.133	11.833	163.330	Q
7	Vanessa Ferrari (ITA)	14.200	–	12.500	14.166	163.330	Q
7	Martina Maggio (ITA)	14.100	13.700	13.066	12.700	163.330	Q
8	Japan	42.432 (7)	39.632 (11)	39.999 (5)	40.599 (3T)	162.662	Q
8	Hitomi Hatakeda (JPN)	12.266	14.133	13.000	13.333	162.662	Q
8	Yuna Hiraiwa (JPN)	13.733	11.700	13.533	12.666	162.662	Q
8	Mai Murakami (JPN)	14.433	12.133	13.466	13.933	162.662	Q
8	Aiko Sugihara (JPN)	14.266	13.366	11.566	13.333	162.662	Q
9	Germany	41.699 (10)	42.632 (5)	37.965 (11)	38.866 (10)	161.662	R1
9	Kim Bui (GER)	13.466	14.066	12.666	13.200	161.662	R1
9	Pauline Schäfer-Betz (GER)	13.933	11.933	12.966	12.733	161.662	R1
9	Elisabeth Seitz (GER)	14.266	14.700	12.333	12.933	161.662	R1
9	Sarah Voss (GER)	13.500	13.866	12.266	12.600	161.662	R1
10	Canada	43.632 (4)	38.700 (12)	39.466 (8)	39.166 (8)	160.964	R2
10	Ellie Black (CAN)	14.533	12.800	14.100	12.266	160.964	R2
10	Brooklyn Moors (CAN)	14.133	13.000	13.300	13.533	160.964	R2
10	Shallon Olsen (CAN)	14.966	11.900	12.066	13.033	160.964	R2
10	Ava Stewart (CAN)	12.933	12.900	12.000	12.600	160.964	R2

=== Individual all-around ===
Rank	Gymnast	Vault (gymnastics)	Uneven bars	Balance beam	Floor (gymnastics)	Total	Qual.
1	Simone Biles (USA)	14.966	14.566	14.066	14.133	57.731	Q
2	Rebeca Andrade (BRA)	15.400	14.200	13.733	14.066	57.399	Q
3	Sunisa Lee (USA)	14.333	15.200	14.200	13.433	57.166	Q
4	Angelina Melnikova (ROC)	14.466	14.933	13.733	14.000	57.132	Q
5	Vladislava Urazova (ROC)	14.600	14.866	14.000	13.633	57.099	Q
6	Viktoria Listunova (ROC)	14.300	14.766	13.866	14.000	56.932	–
7	Nina Derwael (BEL)	13.900	15.366	13.766	13.566	56.598	Q
8	Tang Xijing (CHN)	14.300	14.433	14.333	13.366	56.432	Q
9	Jade Carey (USA)	15.166	14.133	12.866	14.100	56.265	–
10	Mélanie de Jesus dos Santos (FRA)	14.466	14.566	13.233	13.166	55.431	Q
11	MyKayla Skinner (USA)	14.933	13.666	13.233	13.566	55.398	–
12	Jessica Gadirova (GBR)	14.500	13.800	12.866	14.033	55.199	Q
13	Grace McCallum (USA)	14.533	14.100	13.066	13.466	55.165	–
14	Lu Yufei (CHN)	13.600	14.700	14.100	12.666	55.066	Q
15	Zhang Jin (CHN)	14.433	13.100	13.966	13.433	54.932	–
16	Zsófia Kovács (HUN)	14.500	14.433	13.133	12.666	54.732	Q
17	Jennifer Gadirova (GBR)	14.533	13.066	13.300	13.800	54.699	Q
18	Carolann Héduit (FRA)	14.233	13.966	13.200	12.900	54.299	Q
19	Elisabeth Seitz (GER)	14.266	14.700	12.333	12.933	54.232	Q
20	Alice D'Amato (ITA)	14.333	14.233	12.600	13.033	54.199	Q
21	Roxana Popa (ESP)	14.300	14.400	12.866	12.533	54.099	Q
22	Brooklyn Moors (CAN)	14.133	13.000	13.300	13.533	53.966	Q
23	Mai Murakami (JPN)	14.433	12.133	13.466	13.933	53.965	Q
24	Ellie Black (CAN)	14.533	12.800	14.100	12.266	53.699	Q
25	Aline Friess (FRA)	14.966	13.666	12.500	12.500	53.632	–
26	Jutta Verkest (BEL)	13.400	13.633	13.666	12.933	53.632	Q
27	Martina Maggio (ITA)	14.100	13.700	13.066	12.700	53.566	Q
28	Lilia Akhaimova (ROC)	14.766	12.900	12.266	13.633	53.565	–
29	Lee Yun-seo (KOR)	13.400	14.333	12.841	12.966	53.540	Q
30	Giulia Steingruber (SUI)	14.833	12.800	12.600	13.300	53.533	Q
31	Kim Bui (GER)	13.466	14.066	12.666	13.200	53.398	Q
32	Lieke Wevers (NED)	13.600	13.533	13.366	12.866	53.365	R1
33	Amelie Morgan (GBR)	13.858	13.833	13.033	12.466	53.190	–
34	Asia D'Amato (ITA)	14.233	13.933	13.133	11.833	53.132	–
35	Maellyse Brassart (BEL)	13.766	13.366	13.033	12.766	52.931	–
36	Eythora Thorsdottir (NED)	14.433	13.000	12.333	13.133	52.899	R2
37	Georgia Godwin (AUS)	13.766	13.033	12.900	13.166	52.865	R3
38	Elena Gerasimova (ROC)	13.466	13.233	13.766	12.333	52.798	–
39	Hitomi Hatakeda (JPN)	12.266	14.133	13.000	13.333	52.732	R4

Changes before the final

- Top qualifier Simone Biles (USA) withdrew for mental health reasons. Biles was replaced by teammate Jade Carey (USA), who had previously been excluded due to the two-per-country rule.
- Ellie Black (CAN) withdrew due to an ankle injury and was replaced by first reserve Lieke Wevers (NED).

=== Vault ===
Rank	Gymnast	Vault 1				Vault 2				Total	Qual.
Rank	Gymnast	D Score	E Score	Pen.	Score 1	D Score	E Score	Pen.	Score 2	Total	Qual.
1	Simone Biles (USA)	6.0	9.266	0.300	14.966	5.8	9.600		15.400	15.183	Q
2	Jade Carey (USA)	6.0	9.166		15.166	5.8	9.366		15.166	15.166	Q
3	Rebeca Andrade (BRA)	6.0	9.400		15.400	5.4	9.400		14.800	15.100	Q
4	MyKayla Skinner (USA)	6.0	8.933		14.933	5.8	9.000		14.800	14.866	–
5	Yeo Seo-jeong (KOR)	5.8	9.200		15.000	5.4	9.200		14.600	14.800	Q
6	Shallon Olsen (CAN)	6.0	8.966		14.966	5.4	9.033		14.433	14.699	Q
7	Lilia Akhaimova (ROC)	5.8	8.966		14.766	5.6	9.033		14.633	14.699	Q
8	Alexa Moreno (MEX)	5.8	9.033		14.833	5.6	8.933	0.100	14.433	14.633	Q
9	Angelina Melnikova (ROC)	5.4	9.066		14.466	6.0	8.866	0.100	14.766	14.616	Q
10	Giulia Steingruber (SUI)	5.8	9.033		14.833	5.4	8.900		14.300	14.566	R1
11	Mai Murakami (JPN)	5.4	9.033		14.433	5.8	8.700		14.500	14.466	R2
12	Ellie Black (CAN)	5.4	9.133		14.533	5.2	9.100		14.300	14.416	R3

Changes before the final

- Top qualifier Simone Biles (USA) withdrew for mental health reasons. Biles was replaced by teammate MyKayla Skinner (USA), who had previously been excluded due to the two-per-country rule.

=== Uneven bars ===
Rank	Gymnast	D Score	E Score	Pen.	Total	Qual.
1	Nina Derwael (BEL)	6.7	8.666		15.366	Q
2	Sunisa Lee (USA)	6.6	8.600		15.200	Q
3	Anastasia Ilyankova (ROC)	6.4	8.566		14.966	Q
4	Angelina Melnikova (ROC)	6.3	8.633		14.933	Q
5	Vladislava Urazova (ROC)	6.3	8.566		14.866	–
6	Viktoria Listunova (ROC)	6.4	8.366		14.766	–
7	Lu Yufei (CHN)	6.2	8.500		14.700	Q
7	Elisabeth Seitz (GER)	6.2	8.500		14.700	Q
9	Fan Yilin (CHN)	6.3	8.300		14.600	Q
10	Simone Biles (USA)	6.2	8.366		14.566	Q
11	Mélanie de Jesus dos Santos (FRA)	6.4	8.166		14.566	R1
12	Jonna Adlerteg (SWE)	6.3	8.233		14.533	R2
13	Tang Xijing (CHN)	6.0	8.433		14.433	–
14	Zsófia Kovács (HUN)	6.3	8.133		14.433	R3

Changes before the final

- Simone Biles (USA) withdrew for mental health reasons and was replaced by first reserve Mélanie de Jesus dos Santos (FRA).

=== Balance beam ===
Rank	Gymnast	D Score	E Score	Pen.	Total	Qual.
1	Guan Chenchen (CHN)	6.9	8.033		14.933	Q
2	Tang Xijing (CHN)	6.2	8.133		14.333	Q
3	Sunisa Lee (USA)	6.2	8.000		14.200	Q
4	Larisa Iordache (ROU)	6.2	7.933		14.133	Q
5	Lu Yufei (CHN)	6.0	8.100		14.100	–
6	Ellie Black (CAN)	6.3	7.800		14.100	Q
7	Simone Biles (USA)	6.5	7.566		14.066	Q
8	Vladislava Urazova (ROC)	5.8	8.200		14.000	Q
9	Flávia Saraiva (BRA)	5.9	8.066		13.966	Q
10	Zhang Jin (CHN)	6.0	7.966		13.966	–
11	Ou Yushan (CHN)	5.9	8.033		13.933	–
12	Urara Ashikawa (JPN)	5.9	8.000		13.900	R1
13	Viktoria Listunova (ROC)	5.6	8.266		13.866	R2
14	Sanne Wevers (NED)	5.8	8.066		13.866	R3

Changes before the final

- Larisa Iordache (ROU) withdrew due to an ankle injury and was replaced by first reserve Urara Ashikawa (JPN).

=== Floor ===
Rank	Gymnast	D Score	E Score	Pen.	Total	Qual.
1	Vanessa Ferrari (ITA)	5.9	8.266		14.166	Q
2	Simone Biles (USA)	6.7	7.733	0.300	14.133	Q
3	Jade Carey (USA)	6.2	7.900		14.100	Q
4	Rebeca Andrade (BRA)	5.7	8.366		14.066	Q
5	Jessica Gadirova (GBR)	5.5	8.533		14.033	Q
6	Viktoria Listunova (ROC)	5.6	8.400		14.000	Q
7	Angelina Melnikova (ROC)	5.8	8.200		14.000	Q
8	Mai Murakami (JPN)	5.8	8.133		13.933	Q
9	Jennifer Gadirova (GBR)	5.4	8.400		13.800	R1
10	Vladislava Urazova (ROC)	5.3	8.333		13.633	–
11	Lilia Akhaimova (ROC)	5.8	7.833		13.633	–
12	Nina Derwael (BEL)	5.0	8.566		13.566	R2
13	Jordan Chiles (USA)	5.9	7.666		13.566	–
14	MyKayla Skinner (USA)	6.0	7.566		13.566	–
15	Brooklyn Moors (CAN)	5.1	8.433		13.533	R3

Changes before the final

- Second-place qualifier Simone Biles (USA) withdrew and was replaced by first reserve Jennifer Gadirova (GBR).
