= Laia Font =

Spanish gymnast

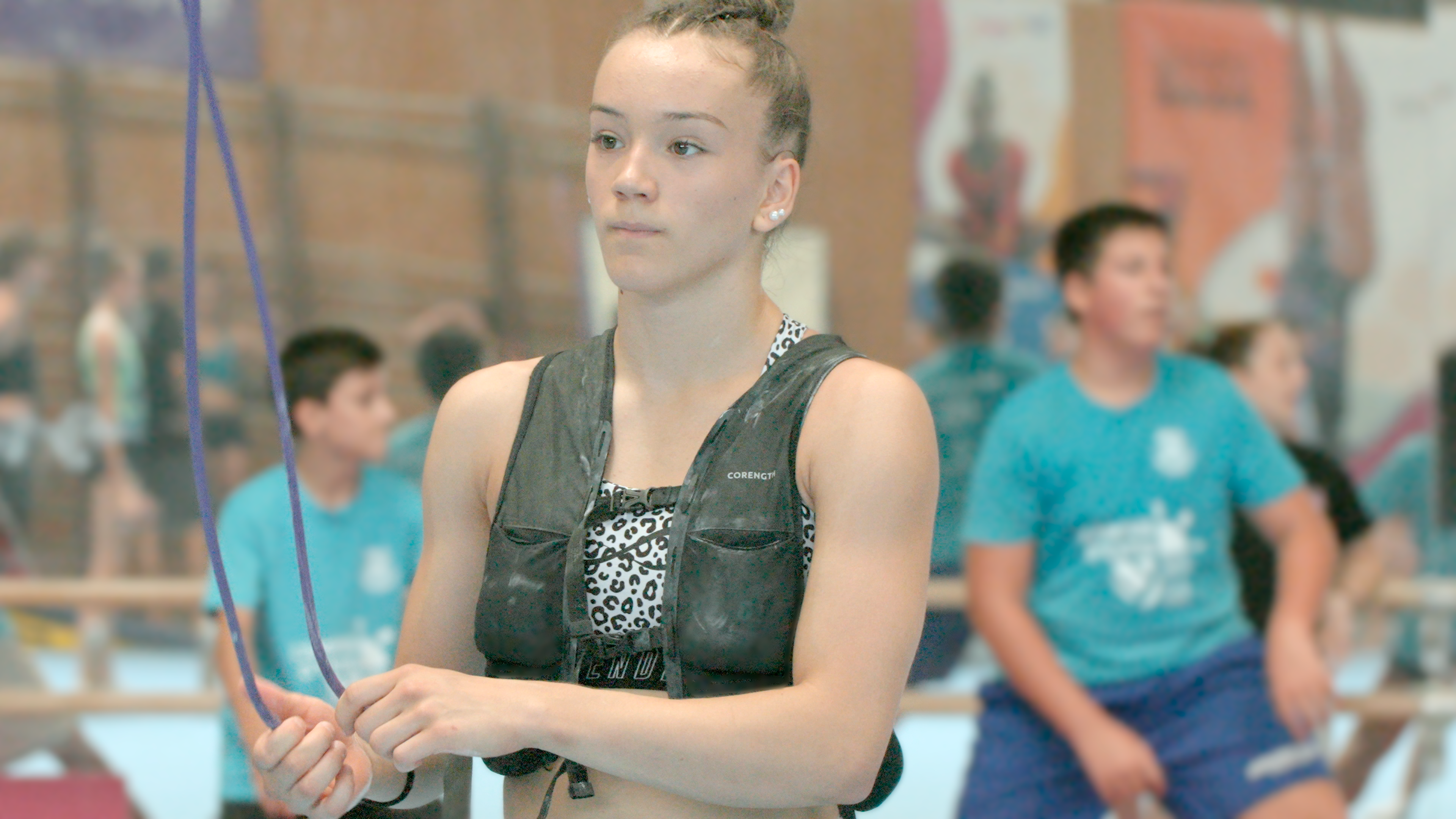
- Born: 20 February 2007 (age 19) Gironella, Spain

Gymnastics career
- Discipline: Women's artistic gymnastics
- Country represented: Spain
Medal record
Representing Spain
Women's artistic gymnastics
World Championships
FIG World Cup
Event	1st	2nd	3rd
World Cup	1	0	2

Laia Font (born 20 February 2007) is a Catalan artistic gymnast.

== Career ==
=== Senior ===
==== 2023 ====
In April, she debuted on the senior international level at the World Cup event in Cottbus, Germany. In the all-around, she finished just outside the podium in fourth.

==== 2026 ====
In March, she competed at the World Cup event in Antaliya, Turkey, winning bronze on vault behind Liudmila Roshchina and Teja Belak.

In April, she competed at the World Cup event in Cairo, Egypt, winning gold on vault and bronze on floor.
