= Marina González =

Spanish artistic gymnast

- Full name: Marina González Lara
- Born: 15 December 2002 (age 23) Malgrat de Mar, Catalonia, Spain
- Height: 1.55 m (5 ft 1 in)

Gymnastics career
- Discipline: Women's artistic gymnastics
- Country represented: Spain; (2015–2021)
- College team: Iowa State Cyclones
- Club: Salt Gimnastic Club
- Head coach: Lucia Guisado
Medal record
Women's artistic gymnastics
Representing Spain
FIG World Cup
Event	1st	2nd	3rd
World Challenge Cup	1	0	0

Marina González Lara (born 15 December 2002) is a Spanish artistic gymnast and social media personality. She represented Spain at the 2020 Summer Olympics. She won the gold medal on the floor exercise at the 2019 Szombathely World Challenge Cup. She competed at the 2019 World Championships and helped Spain qualify as a full team for the 2020 Olympic Games.

== Personal life ==
Marina González was born on 15 December 2002, in Malgrat de Mar, Catalonia, Spain. She speaks both Catalan and Spanish. She trained in athletics and taekwondo before gymnastics, and competed at the Catalan regional taekwondo championships, but she switched to gymnastics when she was eight.

== Gymnastics career ==
=== Junior ===
González made her international debut at the 2015 Elite Gym Massilia, and she finished forty-sixth in the all-around. She then finished nineteenth in the all-around at the 2016 Spanish Cup and twelfth at the Spanish Championships. She then finished twentieth in the all-around at the 2017 Spanish Cup.

=== Senior ===
González became age-eligible for senior international competition in 2018. won a silver medal with her club at both the 2018 1st and 2nd Spanish League. She was supposed to compete at the 2018 Mediterranean Games, but she injured her elbow and was out of competition for the rest of the year.

González finished fifth with her club at the 2019 1st Spanish League and fourth at the 2nd Spanish League. She then won the silver medal in the all-around behind Laura Bechdejú at the Spanish League Finals. She won the silver medal in the all-around at the 2019 Spanish National Championships behind Ana Pérez. She won the gold medal on the floor exercise at the Szombathely World Challenge Cup with a score of 12.866. At the 2019 World Championships, González competed with teammates Cintia Rodríguez, Roxana Popa, Ana Pérez, and Alba Petisco. They finished twelfth as a team during qualifications, and although they did not qualify for the team final, they qualified a team to the 2020 Olympic Games in Tokyo, giving Spain its first team berth at the Olympic Games since 2004.

González won the bronze medal in the all-around and finished fourth with her club at the 2020 1st Spanish League. Then at the 2020 Spanish National Championships, she won the all-around bronze medal behind Alba Petisco and Ana Pérez.

González competed at the 2021 FIT Challenge and helped the Spanish team finish fifth. Individually, she finished fifteenth in the all-around and sixth in the balance beam final. She was selected to the Spanish women's artistic gymnastics team for the postponed 2020 Summer Olympics alongside Laura Bechdejú, Alba Petisco and Roxana Popa. The team finished twelfth in qualifications and did not reach the final.

In August 2021, González signed with Iowa State University, joining their gymnastics team for the 2021–2022 season. She missed her entire freshman season due to a foot injury. She returned to competition at the 2022 Spanish Championships, only competing on the balance beam. While training for the 2022 World Championships, she tore her ACL and missed the entire 2023 NCAA season.

== Social media ==
González created an account on TikTok in 2018. As of January 2023, she has over 1.4 million TikTok followers, and she is the most followed Spanish athlete on the platform.

== Competitive history ==
Competitive history of Marina González at the junior level
Year	Event	Team	AA	VT	UB	BB	FX
2015	Elite Gym Massilia		46				
2016	Spanish Cup		19				
2016	Spanish Championships		12				
2017	Spanish Cup		20				

Competitive history of Marina González at the senior level
Year	Event	Team	AA	VT	UB	BB	FX
2018	1st Spanish League	2nd place, silver medalist(s)					
2018	2nd Spanish League	2nd place, silver medalist(s)					
2019	1st Spanish League	5					
2019	2nd Spanish League	4	13				
2019	Spanish League Finals		2nd place, silver medalist(s)				
2019	Spanish Championships		2nd place, silver medalist(s)				
2019	Szombathely World Challenge Cup						1st place, gold medalist(s)
2019	2nd Heerenveen Friendly	2nd place, silver medalist(s)	16				
2019	World Championships	12					
2020	1st Spanish League	4	3rd place, bronze medalist(s)				
2020	Spanish Championships		3rd place, bronze medalist(s)				
2021	FIT Challenge	5	15			6	
2021	Olympic Games	12	63				
