= Ana Pérez (gymnast) =

Spanish artistic gymnast

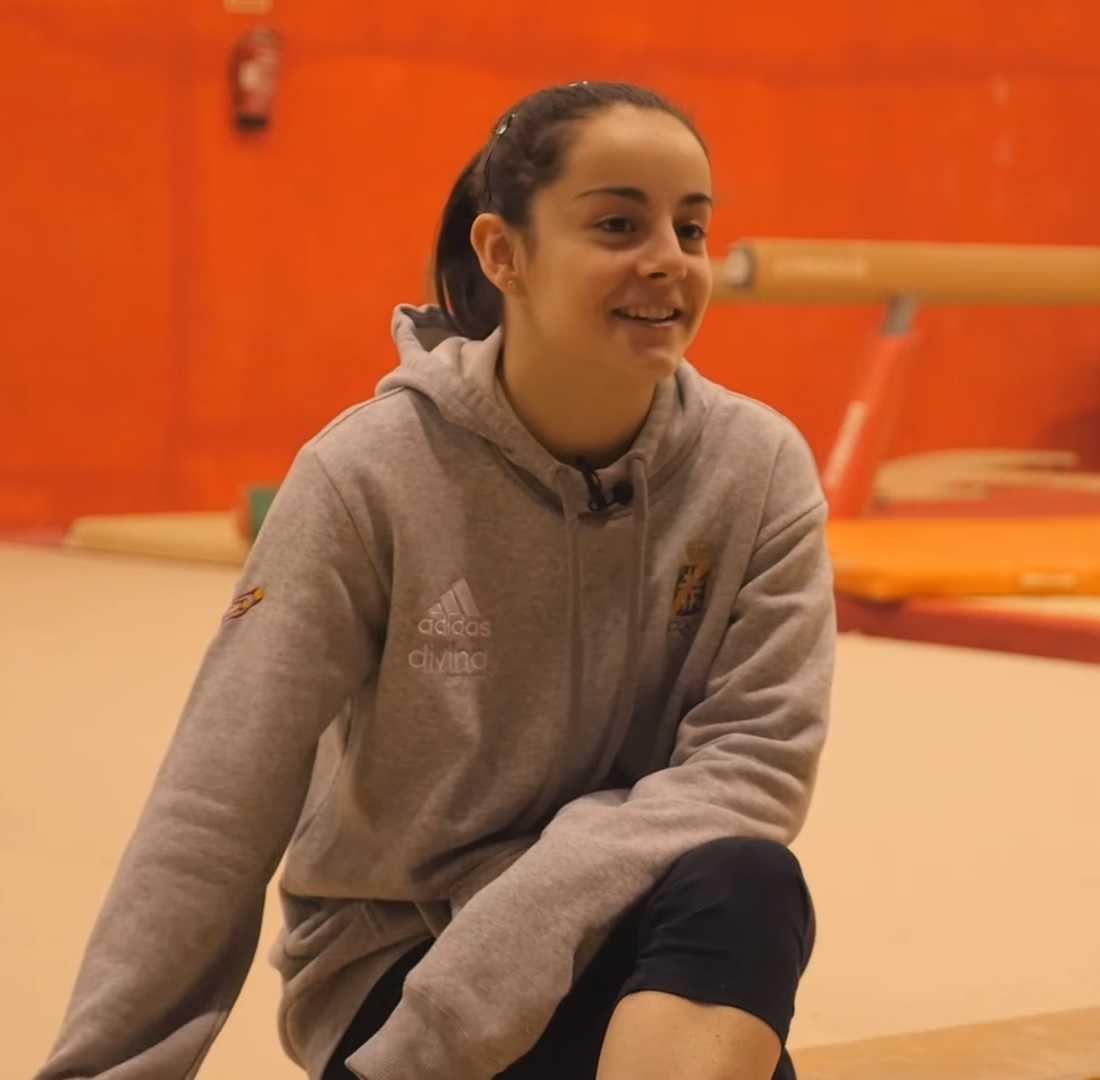
- Pérez in 2016

Personal information
- Full name: Ana Pérez Campos
- Nickname: Anita
- Born: 14 December 1997 (age 28) Seville, Spain
- Height: 151 cm (4 ft 11 in)

Gymnastics career
- Discipline: Women's artistic gymnastics
- Country represented: Spain (2014–present)
- Club: La Salle Gracia
- Head coach: Lucia Guisado
Medal record
Women's artistic gymnastics
Representing Spain
Mediterranean Games
Bronze medal – third place	2018 Tarragona	Team
Bronze medal – third place	2018 Tarragona	All-around
FIG World Cup
Event	1st	2nd	3rd
Apparatus World Cup	0	0	1
World Challenge Cup	0	1	0
Total	0	1	1

Ana Pérez Campos (born 14 December 1997) is a Spanish artistic gymnast. She won all-around and team bronze medals at the 2018 Mediterranean Games. She represented Spain at 2016 and 2024 Olympic Games. She is a five-time Spanish national all-around champion (2015, 2017-2019, 2023) and a two-time World all-around finalist (2017, 2018).

== Career ==
Pérez followed her brother into gymnastics at the Hytasa Gymnastics Club when she was five years old. Between 2004 and 2008, she fractured her arm five times and had surgery three times. In 2014, she received a scholarship to train at the High Performance Center in Madrid.

=== 2014 ===
Pérez began the season at the Spanish Cup, finishing sixth in the all-around. She made her international debut at the European Championships and contributed a vault score of 13.833 toward Spain's sixth-place finish. At the Novara Cup, she helped the Spanish team win the silver medal behind Italy. She competed at the World Championships where the Spanish team finished 16th in the qualification round.

=== 2015 ===
Pérez won the bronze medal on the balance beam at the 2015 Cottbus World Cup. She then qualified for the all-around final at the European Championships and finished 14th. At the FIT Challenge, she helped the Spanish team finish sixth. Then at the European Games, she helped the Spanish team place 12th. At the Spanish Championships, she won her first national all-around title. She then competed with the Spanish team at a friendly meet where they lost to France. At the Novara Cup, the Spanish team finished fourth against Romania, Italy, and Belgium. She then competed at the World Championships, and the Spanish team placed 17th. She finished the season at the Mexican Open and placed sixth in the all-around.

=== 2016 ===
Pérez began the season at the Belgium Friendly and placed fifth in the all-around. She then competed at the Olympic Test Event and placed 18th in the all-around with a total score of 54.199. She helped Spain defeat Romania at a friendly meet and had the highest all-around score of the competition. She then won the all-around gold medal by nearly three points at the Spanish Cup. At the European Championships, the Spanish team finished 10th in the qualification round. She finished third in the all-around at the Spanish Championships.

Spain had to choose between Pérez and Claudia Colom for their one Olympic spot, and ultimately, Pérez was chosen for the Olympic Games. At the Olympic Games, she finished 36th in the all-around during the qualification round with a total score of 54.299, less than one point out of qualifying for the all-around final.

=== 2017 ===
Pérez began the season at the DTB Pokal Team Challenge and competed on all four events to help the Spanish team win the bronze medal. At the Spanish Cup, she won the all-around silver medal behind Nora Fernández. She finished fourth in the all-around at the London World Cup. She then qualified for the all-around final at the European Championships and placed 13th. At the FIT Challenge, she finished fourth in the all-around and helped Spain place fourth in the team final. She then won her second national all-around title.

At the Dutch Invitational, Pérez won silver medals in the all-around, uneven bars, and balance beam and a bronze medal on floor exercise. Then at the Paris World Challenge Cup, she finished sixth on the floor exercise. She then competed at the World Championships and qualified for the all-around final where she finished 20th.

=== 2018 ===
Pérez had surgery on her left wrist at the beginning of the year. She returned to competition at the Mediterranean Games and won bronze with the Spanish team. She also won the all-around bronze medal behind Lara Mori and Louise Vanhille. In the event final, she finished fifth on the uneven bars and fourth on the balance beam. Then at the Spanish Championships, she won her third all-around title. At the European Championships, she helped Spain qualify for the team final where they finished seventh. She finished fourth on uneven bars and fifth on floor exercise at the Paris World Challenge Cup. At the World Championships, she qualified for the all-around final and finished 23rd. In December, she had surgery in her right wrist.

=== 2019 ===
Pérez returned to competition at the FIT Challenge and helped the Spanish team finish fifth. She then successfully defended her national all-around title. She helped Spain win the silver medal at the 2nd Heerenveen Friendly behind the Netherlands. At the 2019 World Championships, she competed with teammates Cintia Rodríguez, Roxana Popa, Marina González, and Alba Petisco. They finished twelfth as a team during qualifications, and although they did not qualify for the team final, they qualified a team to the 2020 Olympic Games in Tokyo, giving Spain its first team berth at the Olympic Games since 2004.

=== 2020–2023: Injury and comeback ===
Pérez was scheduled to compete at the 2020 Tokyo World Cup. However, the event was canceled due to the coronavirus pandemic in Japan. In December 2020, she competed at the Spanish Championships and finished second in the all-around behind Alba Petisco.

At the start of 2021, Pérez severely injured both of her ankles and had two surgeries. She missed two years of competition and considered retirement.

Pérez returned to competition at the 2023 2nd Spanish League, competing only on bars and contributing to her team's third-place finish. She returned on all four events at the City of Jesolo Trophy and helped Spain win the bronze medal. She also qualified for the uneven bars final and finished fourth. Then at the European Championships, she competed on three events and helped the Spanish team place eighth. At the Tel Aviv World Challenge Cup, she won the silver medal on the balance beam. She had the highest all-around total at the Spanish League Final, helping her club finish third. Then at the Spanish Championships, she won her fifth national all-around title.

Pérez helped Spain finish second at the 2023 RomGym Trophy behind Romania. In the event finals, she won the gold medal on the balance beam and the silver medal on the uneven bars. She then competed at the 2023 World Championships in Antwerp. She helped Spain finish 16th in qualifications; although Spain did not qualify a full team to the 2024 Olympic Games, Pérez earned an individual berth as the highest placing eligible gymnast on balance beam.

== Personal life ==
Pérez is the cousin of the Spanish footballer Dani Pérez. She studies journalism at the Complutense University of Madrid.

== Competitive history ==
Competitive history of Ana Pérez
Year	Event	Team	AA	VT	UB	BB	FX
2014	Spanish Cup		6				
2014	European Championships	6					
2014	Novara Cup	2nd place, silver medalist(s)	13				
2014	World Championships	15					
2015	Cottbus World Cup			7		3rd place, bronze medalist(s)	
2015	European Championships		14				
2015	FIT Challenge	6	10				
2015	European Games	12					
2015	Spanish Championships		1st place, gold medalist(s)				
2015	France-Spain Friendly	2nd place, silver medalist(s)	7				
2015	Novara Cup	4	15				
2015	World Championships	17					
2015	Mexican Open		6				
2016	Belgium Friendly		5				
2016	Olympic Test Event		18				7
2016	Encuentro Internacional	1st place, gold medalist(s)	1st place, gold medalist(s)				
2016	Spanish Cup		1st place, gold medalist(s)				
2016	European Championships	10					
2016	Spanish Championships		3rd place, bronze medalist(s)				
2016	Olympic Games		36				
2017	DTB Pokal Team Challenge	3rd place, bronze medalist(s)	5				
2017	Spanish Cup		2nd place, silver medalist(s)				
2017	London World Cup		4				
2017	European Championships		13				
2017	FIT Challenge	4	4				
2017	Spanish Championships		1st place, gold medalist(s)				
2017	Dutch Invitational		2nd place, silver medalist(s)		2nd place, silver medalist(s)	2nd place, silver medalist(s)	3rd place, bronze medalist(s)
2017	Paris World Challenge Cup						6
2017	World Championships		20				
2018	Mediterranean Games	3rd place, bronze medalist(s)	3rd place, bronze medalist(s)		5	4	
2018	Spanish Championships		1st place, gold medalist(s)				
2018	European Championships	7					
2018	Paris World Challenge Cup				4		5
2018	World Championships		23				
2019	FIT Challenge	5	9				
2019	Spanish Championships		1st place, gold medalist(s)				
2019	2nd Heerenveen Friendly	2nd place, silver medalist(s)	5				
2019	World Championships	12					
2020	Spanish Championships		2nd place, silver medalist(s)				
2023	2nd Spanish League	3rd place, bronze medalist(s)					
2023	City of Jesolo Trophy	3rd place, bronze medalist(s)	15		4		
2023	European Championships	8					
2023	Tel Aviv World Challenge Cup					2nd place, silver medalist(s)	
2023	Spanish League Final	3rd place, bronze medalist(s)	1st place, gold medalist(s)				
2023	Spanish Championships		1st place, gold medalist(s)				
2023	RomGym Trophy	2nd place, silver medalist(s)	4		2nd place, silver medalist(s)	1st place, gold medalist(s)	
2023	World Championships	16				30	
2024
2024	Olympic Games		45				

== See also ==
- List of Olympic female artistic gymnasts for Spain
