= Patricia Moreno =

Spanish artistic gymnast

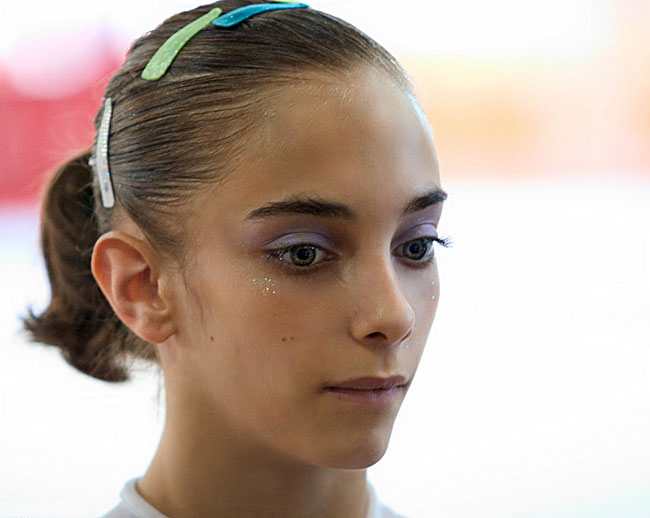

Personal information
- Full name: Patricia Moreno Sánchez
- Born: January 7, 1988 (age 38) Madrid, Spain
- Height: 145 cm (4 ft 9 in)

Gymnastics career
- Discipline: Women's artistic gymnastics
- Country represented: Spain
- Head coach: Jesus Carballo
- Eponymous skills: 3 1/2 twist (Floor Exercise)
Medal record
Representing Spain
Olympic Games
Bronze medal – third place	2004 Athens	Floor Exercise

Patricia Moreno Sánchez (born January 7, 1988, in Madrid) is a Spanish former artistic gymnast. Moreno began gymnastics in 1995 and admired Romanian Simona Amânar. Her best event was floor exercise.

== Career ==
=== Junior career ===
In 2002, Moreno competed at the 2002 Junior European Championships. Here she placed 14th in the all-around and 4th in the floor exercise final.

=== Senior career ===
Moreno became a senior gymnast in 2003. Moreno competed at the 2003 World Championships in Anaheim, California. Here she and the Spanish team placed 5th in the team final, therefore qualifying a full team to the 2004 Olympics. Individually, she placed 22nd in the all around competition. In 2004, Moreno was named to the 2004 Olympic team, where the team placed 5th. Individually, Moreno won Spanish women's artistic gymnastics' first ever Olympic medal in Athens, where she was third on floor with score of 9.487. During the Olympics, Moreno also debuted a 3 and a 1/2 twist on floor, a move which is now named after her. Moreno has also trained a quadruple twist, though it was never performed internationally.

Following the 2004 Olympics, Moreno continued to compete. Moreno competed at the 2005 American Cup. Here she won a gold medal on the floor exercise and placed 7th on balance beam. Moreno missed the majority of the 2005 season with an injury sustained at the 2005 European Championships in Debrecen, Hungary but continued to compete in 2006. Moreno struggled to regain her Olympic form following the injury. She appeared at the 2006 European Championships in Volos, Greece. Here, Moreno and the Spanish team placed 4th; Moreno only competed on floor exercise. At the 2006 World Championships in Aarhus, Denmark. Here, the team placed 8th. she was a reserve for the floor exercise finals. Moreno competed at the 2007 European Championships in Amsterdam, where she qualified to the all-around and floor exercise finals, where she placed 15th and 7th respectively. Moreno was selected for the Spanish team to compete at the 2007 World Championships in Stuttgart, Germany, however she injured herself on the balance beam in qualifications and was unable to continue the competition. Moreno's final international competition was the 2008 City of Jesolo Trophy, where the Spanish team earned a bronze medal.

== Floor Music ==
2003: "Welcome to Cuba" from Die Another Day

2004-2005: "Guapa" by Cafe de Miami

2006-2007: "Palladio" by Escala

== See also ==
- List of Olympic female gymnasts for Spain
