= Alicia Fernández (gymnast) =

Spanish gymnast

Personal information
- Nationality: Spanish
- Born: 25 November 1973 (age 51); Madrid, Spain

Sport
- Sport: Gymnastics

Alicia Fernández (born 25 November 1973) is a Spanish gymnast. She competed at the 1992 Summer Olympics where she placed 20th in the all around and fifth with the Spanish team.
