= Nuria Belchi =

Spanish gymnast

Personal information
- Nationality: Spanish
- Born: 10 July 1973 (age 51); Barcelona, Spain

Sport
- Sport: Gymnastics

Nuria Belchi Ibáñez (born 10 July 1973) is a Spanish gymnast. She competed in six events at the 1988 Summer Olympics.
