= Manuela Hervás =

Spanish gymnast

Personal information
- Nationality: Spanish
- Born: 1 August 1972 (age 52); Madrid, Spain

Sport
- Sport: Gymnastics
- Club: Calvo y Munar
- Coached by: Pilar Aristu; Jesús Carballo

Manuela Hervás Rodríguez (born 8 January 1972) is a Spanish gymnast. She competed in six events at the 1988 Summer Olympics.
