= Irene Martínez (gymnast) =

Spanish gymnast

Personal information
- Nationality: Spanish
- Born: 20 February 1966 (age 59); Madrid, Spain

Sport
- Sport: Gymnastics

Irene Martínez (born 20 February 1966) is a Spanish gymnast. She competed at the 1980 Summer Olympics and the 1984 Summer Olympics.
