= Lidia Castillejo =

Spanish gymnast

Personal information
- Nationality: Spanish
- Born: 4 September 1969 (age 55); Barcelona, Spain

Sport
- Sport: Gymnastics

Lidia Castillejo Soriano (born 4 September 1969) is a Spanish gymnast. She competed in six events at the 1988 Summer Olympics.
