= Virginia Navarro =

Spanish gymnast

Personal information
- Nationality: Spanish
- Born: 11 October 1966 (age 58); Madrid, Spain

Sport
- Sport: Gymnastics

Virginia Navarro (born 11 October 1966) is a Spanish gymnast. She competed in six events at the 1984 Summer Olympics.
