= Paloma Moro =

Spanish gymnast (born 1982)

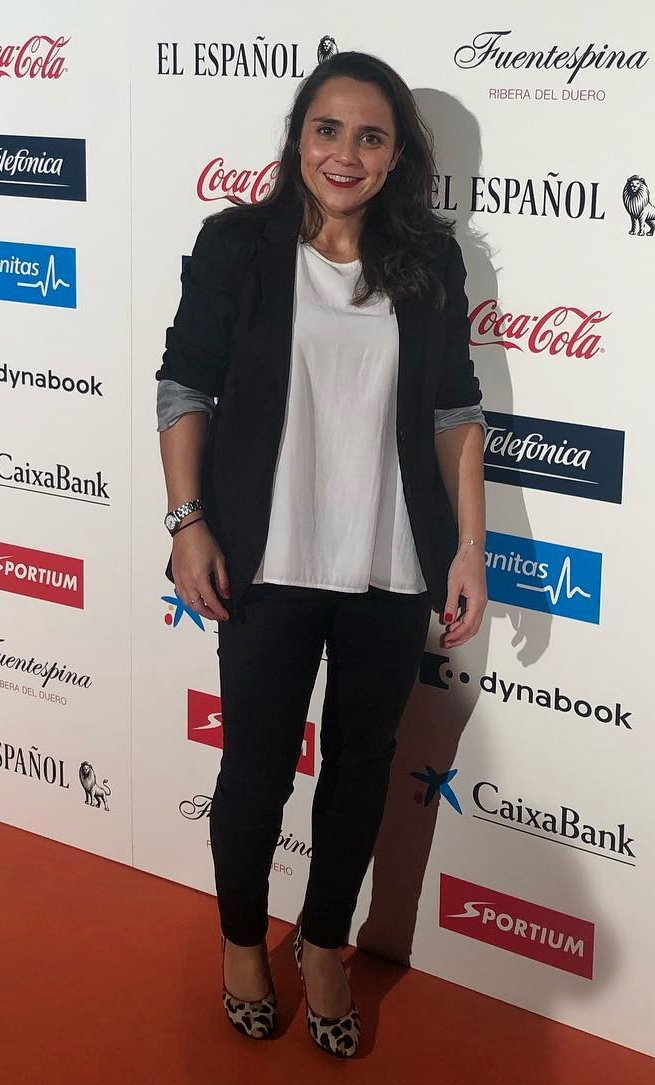

Personal information
- Nationality: Spanish
- Born: 18 June 1982 (age 42); Madrid, Spain

Sport
- Sport: Gymnastics

Paloma Moro (born 18 June 1982) is a Spanish gymnast. She competed at the 2000 Summer Olympics.
