= Marta Cusidó =

Spanish gymnast (born 1983)

Personal information
- Nationality: Spanish
- Born: 27 September 1983 (age 42) Barcelona, Spain

Sport
- Sport: Gymnastics
Medal record
Representing Spain
Women's artistic gymnastics
Mediterranean Games
Gold medal – first place	2001 Tunis	Team

Marta Cusidó Muntada (born 27 September 1983) is a Spanish gymnast. She competed at the 2000 Summer Olympics.
