= Nuria García =

Spanish gymnast

Personal information
- Nationality: Spanish
- Born: 13 March 1973 (age 52); Madrid, Spain

Sport
- Sport: Gymnastics

Nuria García (born 13 March 1973) is a Spanish gymnast. She competed in six events at the 1988 Summer Olympics.
