= Laura Campos =

Spanish artistic gymnast

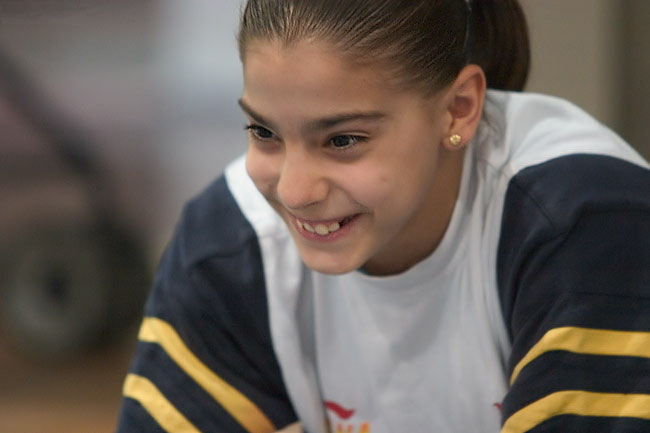

Personal information
- Full name: Laura Campos
- Born: 13 September 1988 (age 38)

Gymnastics career
- Discipline: Women's artistic gymnastics
- Country represented: Spain; (2004-2008)

Laura Campos (born 13 September 1988 in Mérida, Extremadura) is a Spanish female former artistic gymnast, who represented her nation at international competitions.

She participated at the 2004 Summer Olympics in Athens, Greece and at the 2008 Summer Olympics in Beijing, China.
