= Margot Estévez =

Spanish gymnast

Personal information
- Nationality: Spanish
- Born: 12 February 1968 (age 57); Madrid, Spain

Sport
- Sport: Gymnastics

Margot Estévez (born 12 February 1968) is a Spanish gymnast. She competed in six events at the 1984 Summer Olympics.
