= Alba Petisco =

Spanish artistic gymnast

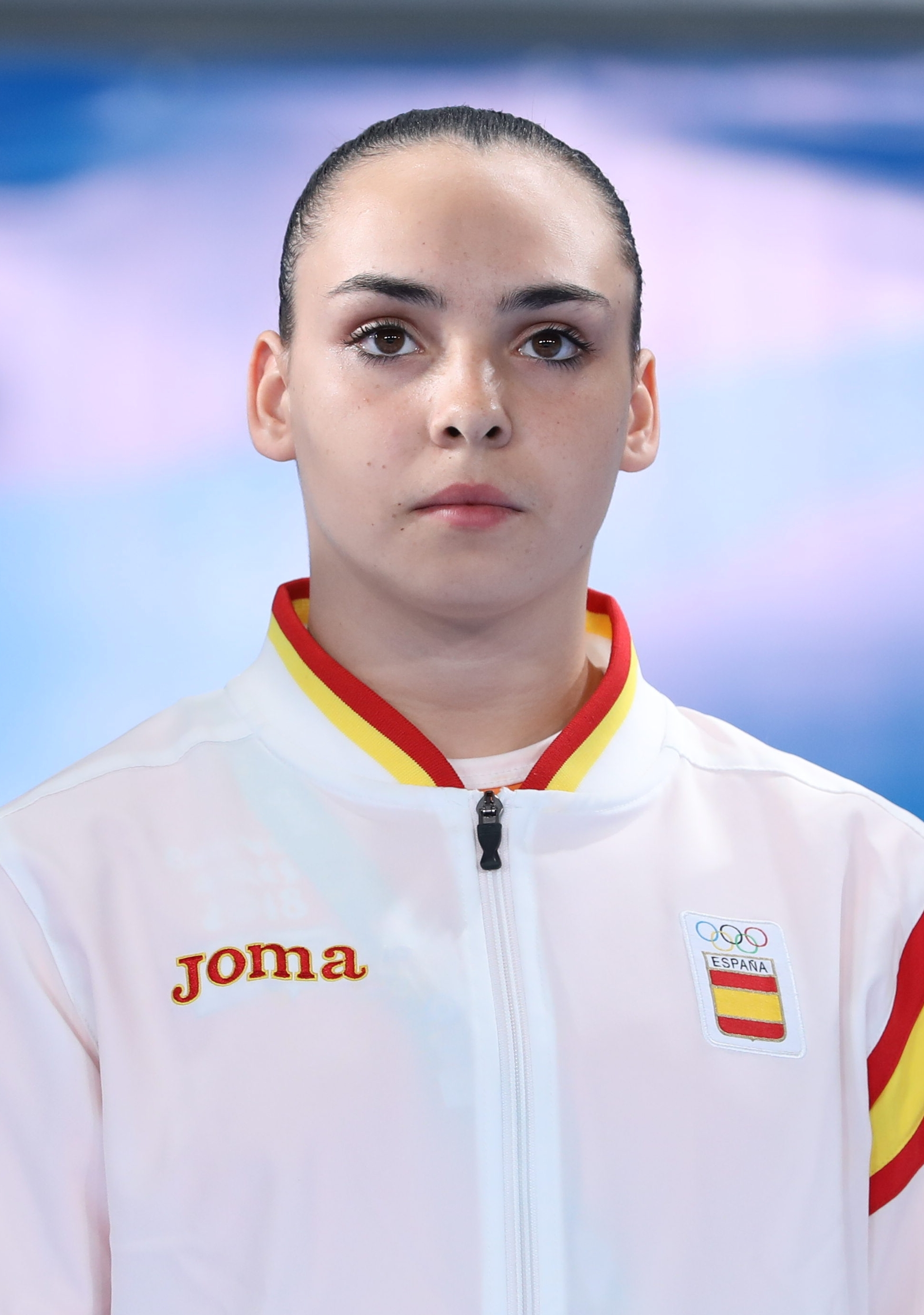
- Petisco at the 2018 Youth Olympic Games

Personal information
- Full name: Alba Petisco de San Fulgencio
- Born: 1 February 2003 (age 23) Sant Joan Despí, Spain
- Height: 1.51 m (4 ft 11 in)

Gymnastics career
- Discipline: Women's artistic gymnastics
- Country represented: Spain; (2016–present)
- Club: Club Gimnástica Esplugues Les Moreres (ESP); Gym Flip Beaucarie-Tarascon (FRA)
- Gym: CARD
- Head coach: Kati Zapata
- Assistant coach: Lucia Guisado
Medal record
Artistic gymnastics
Representing Spain
European Championships
Silver medal – second place	2025 Leipzig	All-around
Bronze medal – third place	2025 Leipzig	Floor exercise
Mediterranean Games
Silver medal – second place	2026 Taranto	Team
Silver medal – second place	2026 Taranto	All-around
Silver medal – second place	2026 Taranto	Balance beam
Silver medal – second place	2026 Taranto	Floor exercise
Bronze medal – third place	2022 Oran	Team
FIG World Cup
Event	1st	2nd	3rd
Apparatus World Cup	1	0	1
World Challenge Cup	0	1	1
Total	1	1	2
Representing (International Olympic Committee) Mixed-NOCs
Youth Olympic Games
Gold medal – first place	2018 Buenos Aires	Mixed team

Alba Petisco de San Fulgencio (born 1 February 2003) is an artistic gymnast. She is the 2025 European all-around silver medalist. She represented Spain at the 2020 and 2024 Olympic Games as well as the 2018 Youth Olympics where she was part of the Mixed NOC team who won gold in the mixed multi-discipline team competition. She won a bronze medal with the Spanish team at the 2022 Mediterranean Games. Additionally, she is the 2020 and 2022 Spanish all-around champion.

== Early life ==
Petisco was born in Sant Joan Despí, Catalonia, Spain, on 1 February 2003 but was raised in Villarino de los Aires. She began training in gymnastics when she was 5 years old.

== Junior career ==
=== 2016–17 ===
Petisco made her international debut at the Elite Gym Massilia in November 2016. She finished 53rd in the all-around in the open division. Later that month, she competed at the Turnkunst International where she helped Spain finish fifth as a team, and individually, she finished 21st in the all-around.

In 2017, Petisco competed at the Top 12 Championships in France where her team finished in 8th place, and individually, Petisco finished 25th in the all-around. She next competed at the Spanish Cup where she placed 36th in the all-around. At the Spanish Championships, Petisco finished 14th in the all-around.

=== 2018 ===
Patisco had a breakout year in 2018. She helped her club finish fourth at the 1st Spanish League. In February, she competed at the Mallorca Cup where she finished seventh in her division. Then at the 2nd Spanish League, she had the highest all-around score of the competition and led her club to the silver medal. She competed at the Youth Olympic Qualifier where she placed 17th and qualified a spot at the 2018 Summer Youth Olympics for Spain. Petisco next competed at the Spanish Championships where she placed second in the all-around, behind Alba Asencio, as well as second on uneven bars and balance beam. She next represented Spain at the European Championships. During qualifications, she helped Spain finish 11th as a team, and individually, she placed 36th in the all-around.

In October, Petisco represented Spain at the 2018 Youth Olympic Games. She qualified for the all-around final and was the third reserve for the vault final. Her mixed multi-discipline team, which was named after gymnastics legend Simone Biles, won the gold medal. In the all-around final, she placed 11th.

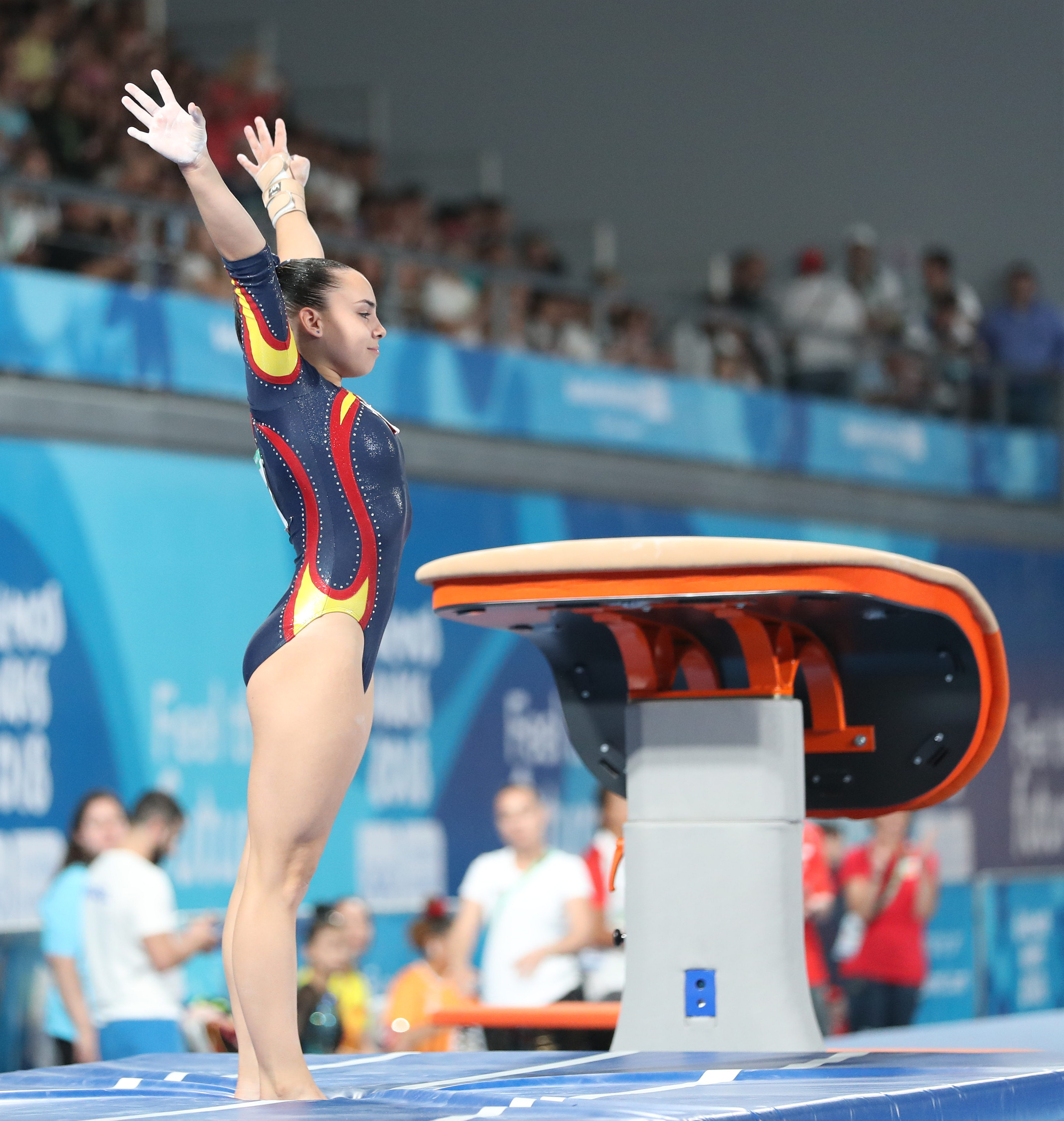
Vault qualification

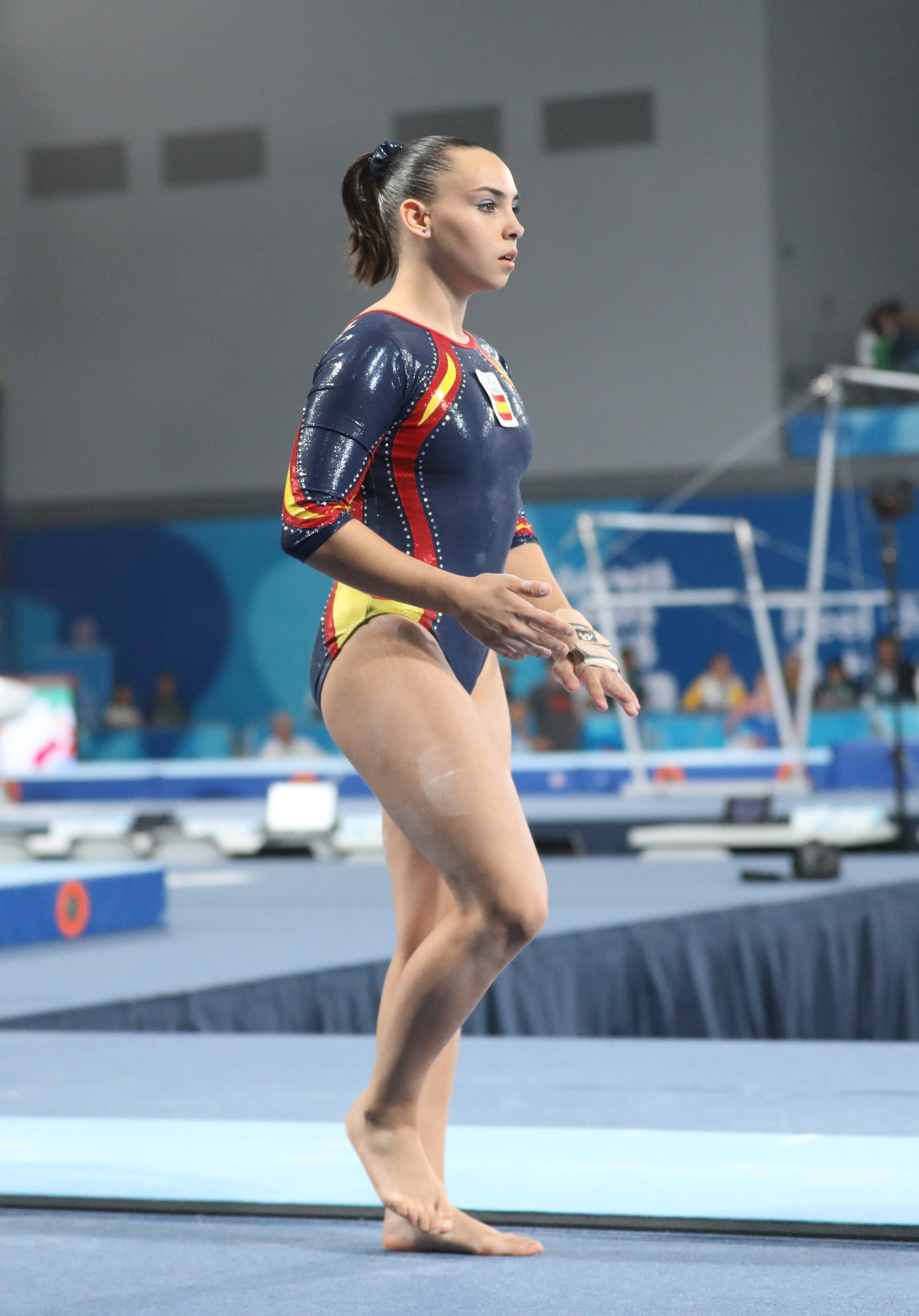
All-Around Final

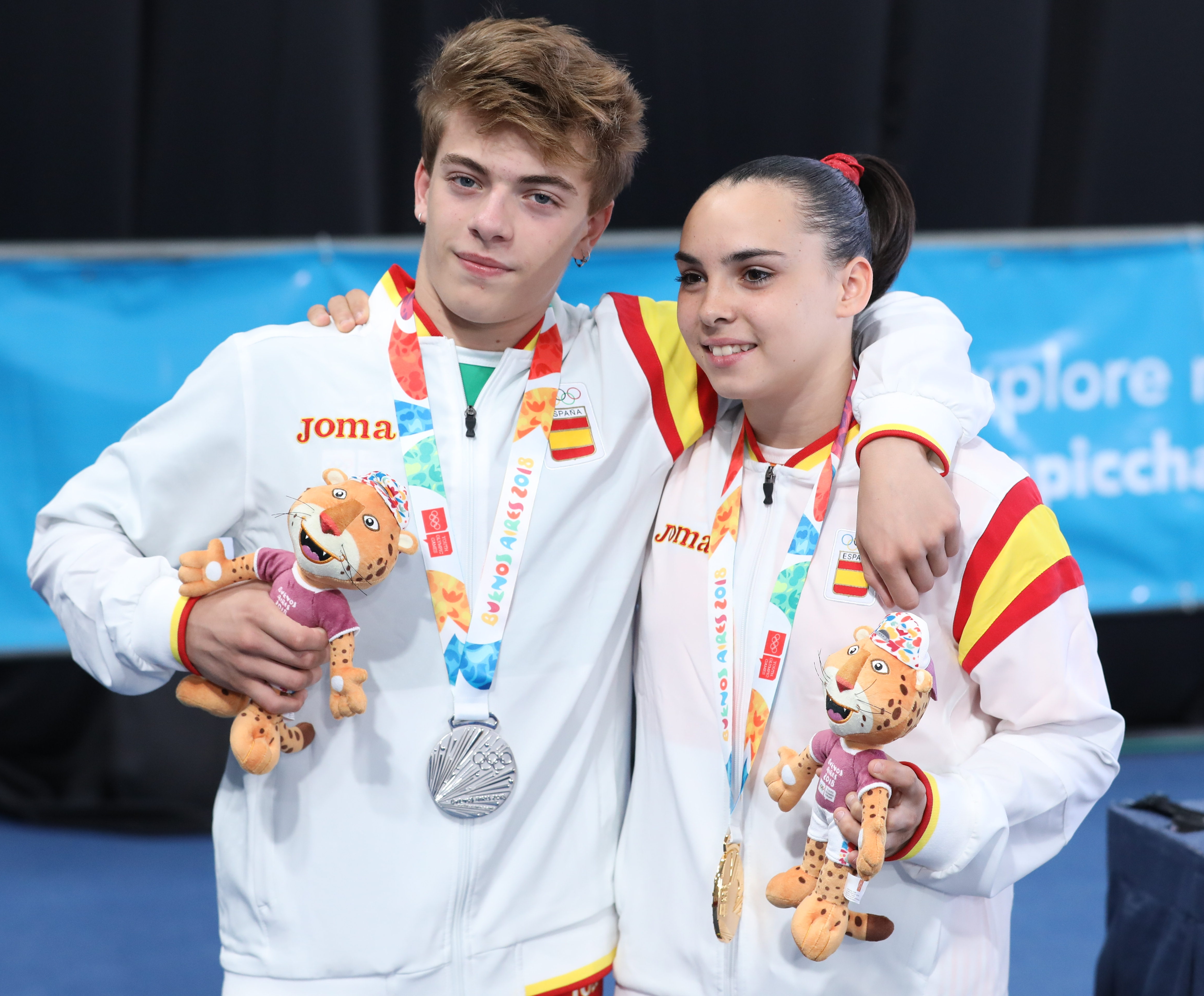
Petisco and compatriot Robert Vilarasau with their mixed multi-discipline team medals

Petisco at the 2018 Youth Olympics

== Senior career ==
=== 2019 ===
Petisco became age-eligible for senior international competition in 2019. At the 1st Spanish League, she helped her club win the bronze medal, and she also won bronze in the all-around. She made her senior international debut at the DTB Team Challenge where she helped Spain finish eighth as a team and individually she placed 14th in the all-around. Then at the 2nd Spanish League, she won the bronze medal in the all-around, and her club finished fifth. She competed at the European Championships but failed to qualify for any event finals. She then won silver in the all-around behind Cintia Rodriguez at the 3rd Spanish League. Petisco competed at the Flanders International Team Challenge in Ghent, Belgium, where she helped Spain finish 6th, and individually, she finished 13th in the all-around. At the Spanish Championships, Petisco finished 6th in the all-around but won silver on floor exercise behind Ana Pérez. In September, Petisco competed at the Szombathely World Challenge Cup where she qualified to the uneven bars final. During the final, she finished in fifth place. Petisco next competed at the 2nd Heerenveen Friendly where she helped Spain finish second behind the Netherlands, and individually, she placed 13th in the all-around.

At the World Championships in Stuttgart, Petisco, alongside teammates Cintia Rodríguez, Roxana Popa, Ana Pérez, and Marina González, finished 12th as a team during qualifications. Although they did not qualify for the team final, they qualified a team to the 2020 Olympic Games in Tokyo, giving Spain its first team berth at the Olympic Games since 2004.

=== 2020 ===
Petisco won the all-around at the 1st Spanish League, and her club finished fifth. She also won the all-around at the 2nd Spanish League and helped her club win the team competition. She competed at the American Cup, replacing teammate Roxana Popa, and finished in 12th place. Petisco was scheduled to compete at the Stuttgart World Cup taking place in March; however the event was later canceled due to the COVID-19 pandemic in Germany. In December, Petisco competed at the Spanish Championships where she placed first in the all-around with a score of 52.100, ahead of Ana Pérez.

=== 2021 ===
Petisco competed at the FIT Challenge where she helped the Spanish team place fifth. In June 2021, she was selected to the Spanish women's artistic gymnastics team for the postponed 2020 Summer Olympics alongside Laura Bechdejú, Marina González and Roxana Popa. The team finished 12th in qualifications and did not reach the final. After the Olympics, she competed at the 2nd Spanish League, finishing fourth in the all-around and third with her team. Then at the 3rd Spanish League, her club finished fourth. She then finished second in the all-around at the Spanish Championships behind Roxana Popa. She won the all-around at the Spanish League Final and led her club to winning the title.

=== 2022 ===
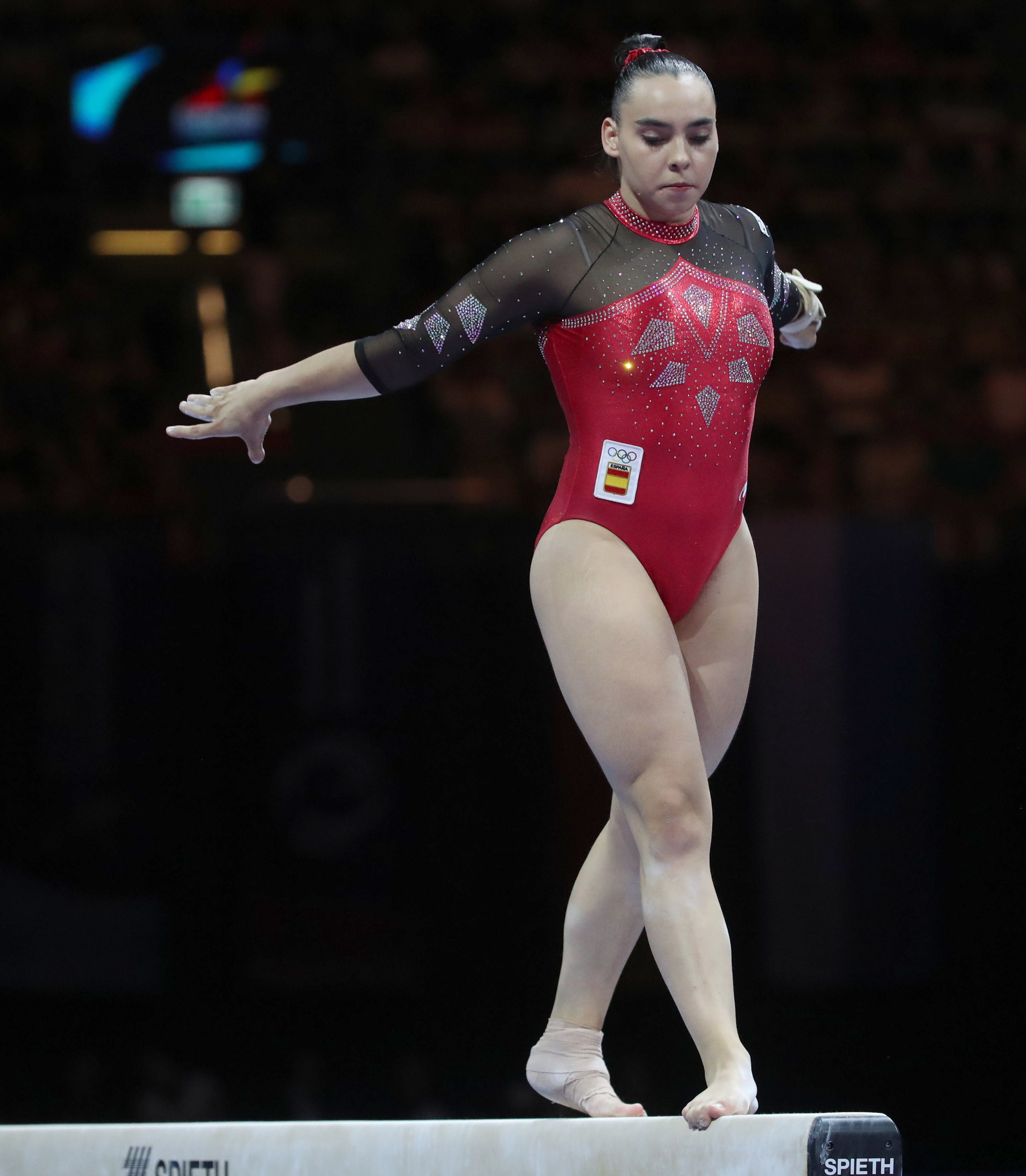
Petisco at the 2022 European Championships

Petisco started her season at the Cottbus World Cup, where she won the gold medal on floor exercise, and took the bronze on vault behind Tjaša Kysselef and Ofir Netzer. She won the all-around at the 1st Spanish League and helped her club win. Then at the DTB Pokal Team Challenge, she helped the Spanish team finish fifth, and she finished sixth in the uneven bars final. She then won the all-around at the 2nd Spanish League and won the bronze medal with her club.

Petisco finished eighth on the uneven bars at the Koper World Challenge Cup. In June, she competed at the Mediterranean Games, where the Spanish team took the bronze medal behind Italy and France. Individually, Petisco finished fifth in the floor final. She then won her second national all-around title. At the European Championships in Munich, Petisco helped Spain qualify to the team final, where they placed eighth. She also qualified for the balance beam final, finishing sixth with a score of 12.400. In September, she had surgery to remove a cyst on her heel bone, and she missed the rest of the season.

=== 2023 ===
Petisco finished sixth with her club at the 2nd Spanish League. At the City of Jesolo Trophy, she helped the Spanish team win the bronze medal behind Italy and South Korea. Individually, she finished eighth in the all-around and seventh in the floor exercise final. Then at the European Championships, she helped the Spanish team finish eighth. She also qualified for the all-around final where she finished eleventh with a total score of 51.099. She contributed scores on uneven bars and balance beam towards her club's fifth place finish at the 3rd Spanish League. At the Tel Aviv World Challenge Cup, she took bronze on floor exercise.

Petisco finished second in the all-around behind Ana Pérez at the Spanish Championships. At the RomGym Trophy, she helped Spain finish second behind Romania. At the World Championships, Petisco finished 36th in the all-around, qualifying for the 2024 Summer Olympics as an individual.

=== 2024 ===
Petisco competed at the 2024 European Championships where she placed fifth in the all-around and helped Spain finish fifth as a team. During event finals she placed sixth on both balance beam and floor exercise. At the 2024 Olympic Games Petisco finished thirty-sixth during qualifications and did not advance to any finals.

=== 2025 ===
Petisco competed at the DTB Pokal Team Challenge where she helped Spain win gold in the team event. She next competed at the 2025 City of Jesolo Trophy where she helped Spain finish fourth as a team. Individually she finished eighth in the all-around and qualified to the balance beam and floor exercise finals. During the event finals she placed sixth on balance beam and won gold on floor exercise.

In May, Petisco competed at the 2025 European Championships. During the qualification round, which also served as the team final, she helped Spain finish ninth and individually she qualified to the all-around and floor exercise finals. During the all-around final, Petisco performed cleanly on all four apparatuses and won the silver medal behind Manila Esposito. In doing so she became the first Spanish woman to win an all-around medal at a European Championships. During apparatus event finals she won bronze on floor exercise behind Ana Bărbosu and Esposito.

== Competitive history ==
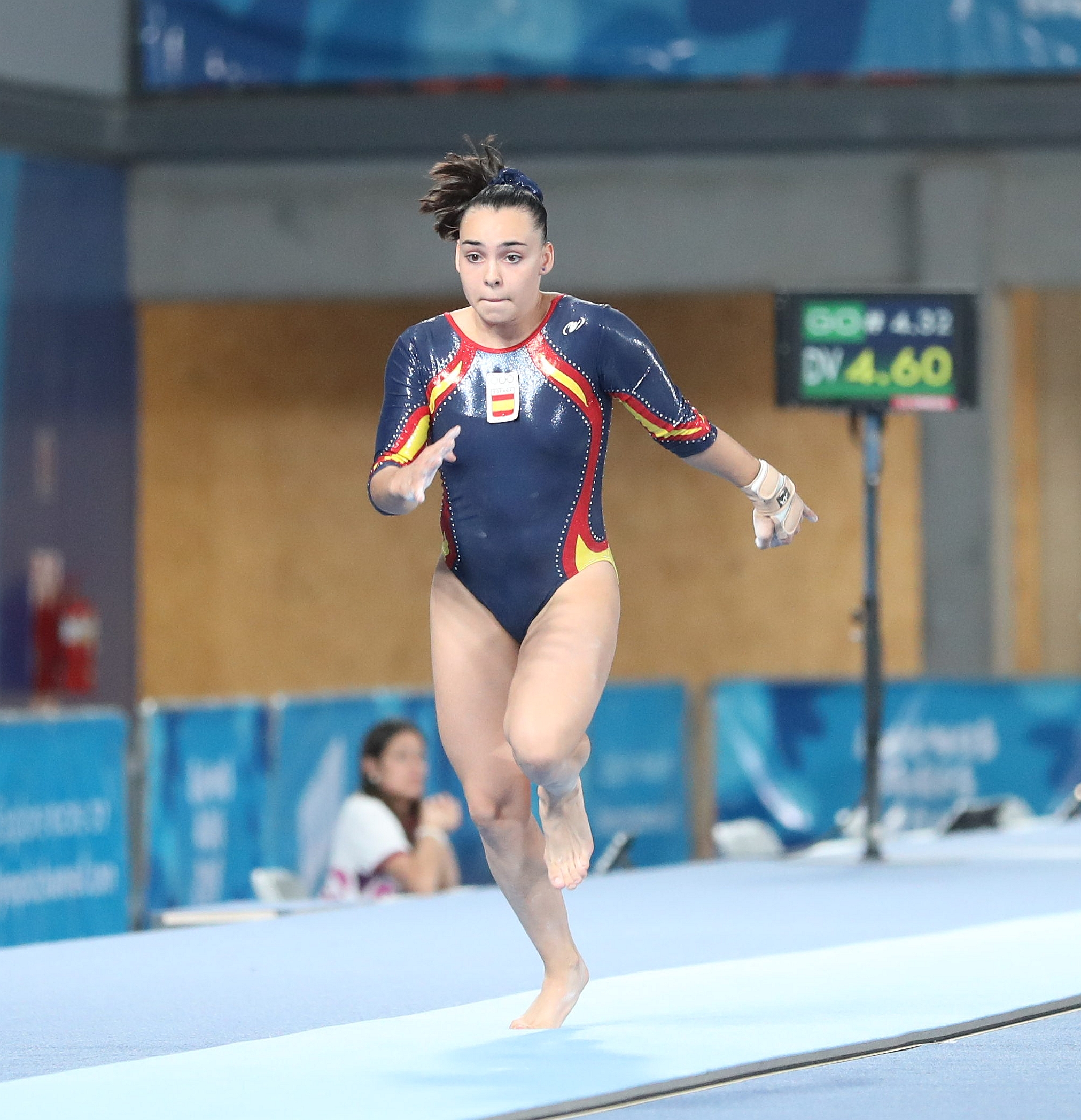
Petisco at the 2018 Youth Olympic Games

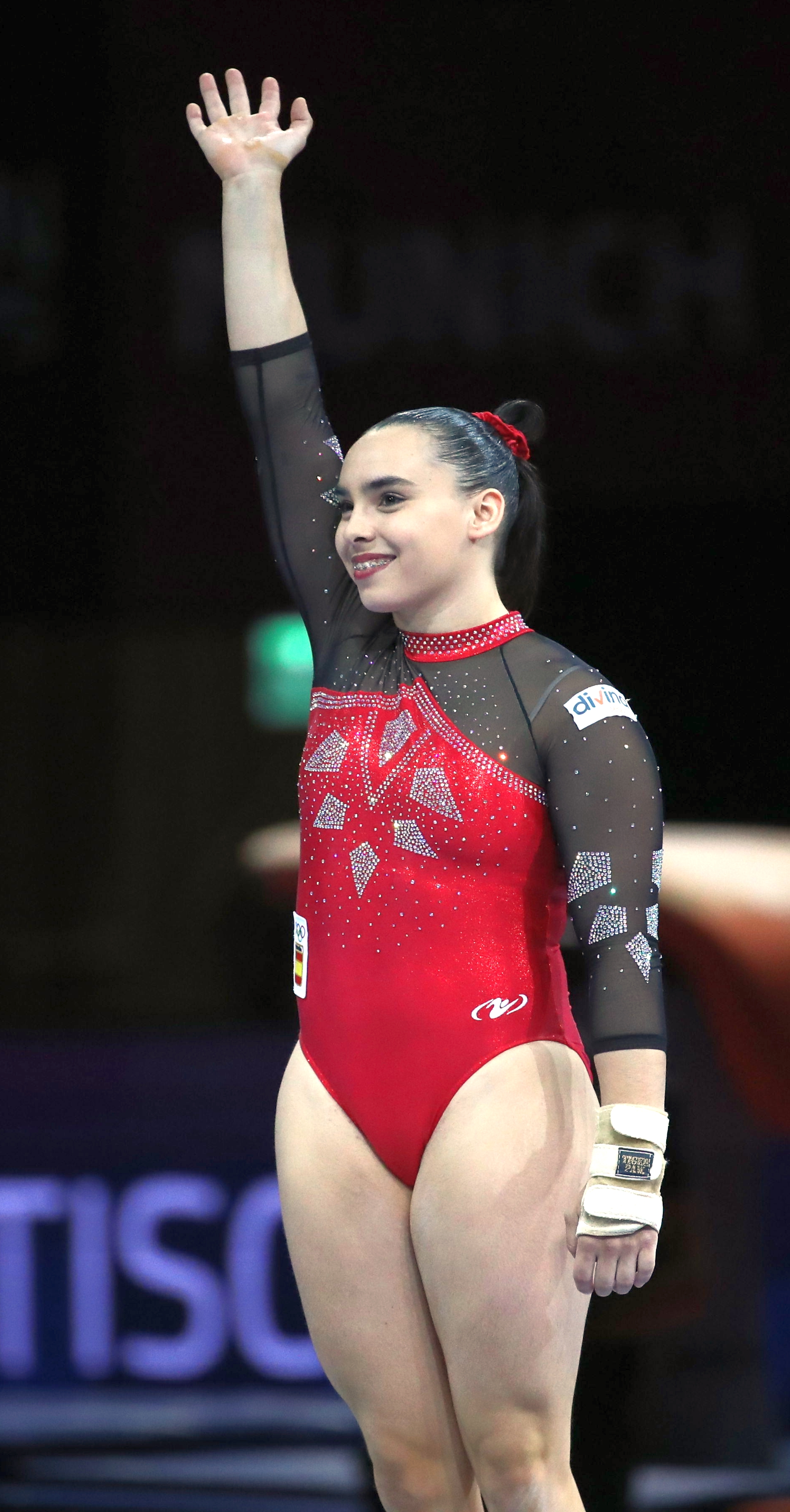
Petisco at the 2022 European Championships

Competitive history of Alba Petisco at the junior level
Year	Event	Team	AA	VT	UB	BB	FX
2016	Elite Gym Massilia		53				
2016	Turnkunst International	5	21				
2017	Top 12 Championships	8	25				
2017	Spanish Cup		36				
2017	Spanish Championships		14				
2018	1st Spanish League	4					
2018	Mallorca Cup		7				
2018	2nd Spanish League	2nd place, silver medalist(s)	1st place, gold medalist(s)				
2018	Youth Olympic Qualifier		17				
2018	Spanish Championships		2nd place, silver medalist(s)		2nd place, silver medalist(s)	2nd place, silver medalist(s)	
2018	European Championships	11	36				
2018	Youth Olympic Games	(gold) (Note: The teams were randomly assigned with gymnasts from different countries and disciplines)	11	R3			

Competitive history of Alba Petisco at the senior level
Year	Event	Team	AA	VT	UB	BB	FX
2019	1st Spanish League	3rd place, bronze medalist(s)	3rd place, bronze medalist(s)				
2019	DTB Team Challenge	8	14				
2019	2nd Spanish League	5	3rd place, bronze medalist(s)				
2019	3rd Spanish League		2nd place, silver medalist(s)				
2019	FIT Challenge	6	13				
2019	Spanish Championships		6				2nd place, silver medalist(s)
2019	Szombathely World Challenge Cup				5		
2019	2nd Heerenveen Friendly	2nd place, silver medalist(s)	13				
2019	World Championships	R4					
2020	1st Spanish League	5	1st place, gold medalist(s)				
2020	2nd Spanish League	1st place, gold medalist(s)	1st place, gold medalist(s)				
2020	American Cup		12				
2020	Spanish Championships		1st place, gold medalist(s)				
2021	FIT Challenge	5	25				
2021	Olympic Games	12					
2021	2nd Spanish League	3rd place, bronze medalist(s)	4				
2021	3rd Spanish League	4					
2021	Spanish Championships		2nd place, silver medalist(s)	2nd place, silver medalist(s)	2nd place, silver medalist(s)	2nd place, silver medalist(s)	1st place, gold medalist(s)
2021	Spanish League Finals	1st place, gold medalist(s)	1st place, gold medalist(s)				
2022	Cottbus World Cup			3rd place, bronze medalist(s)			1st place, gold medalist(s)
2022	1st Spanish League	1st place, gold medalist(s)	1st place, gold medalist(s)				
2022	DTB Pokal Team Challenge	6			5		
2022	2nd Spanish League	3rd place, bronze medalist(s)	1st place, gold medalist(s)				
2022	Koper World Challenge Cup				8		
2022	Mediterranean Games	3rd place, bronze medalist(s)					5
2022	Spanish Championships		1st place, gold medalist(s)				
2022	European Championships	8	12			6	
2023	2nd Spanish League	6					
2023	City of Jesolo Trophy	3rd place, bronze medalist(s)	8				7
2023	European Championships	8	11				
2023	3rd Spanish League	5					
2023	Tel Aviv Challenge Cup			5		6	3rd place, bronze medalist(s)
2023	Spanish Championships		2nd place, silver medalist(s)	2nd place, silver medalist(s)			1st place, gold medalist(s)
2023	RomGym Trophy	2nd place, silver medalist(s)			8		
2023	World Championships	16	36				
2024	DTB Pokal Team Challenge	6					2nd place, silver medalist(s)
2024	City of Jesolo Trophy	9	16				
2024	European Championships	5	5			6	6
2024	Olympic Games		36				
2025	DTB Pokal Team Challenge	1st place, gold medalist(s)					4
2025	City of Jesolo Trophy	4	9			6	1st place, gold medalist(s)
2025	European Championships	9	2nd place, silver medalist(s)				3rd place, bronze medalist(s)
2025	Paris World Challenge Cup				6		
2025	Szombathely World Challenge Cup					2nd place, silver medalist(s)	8
2025	World Championships	—N/a	14				R1
2025	Arthur Gander Memorial		3rd place, bronze medalist(s)				
2026	American Cup	4					
2026	City of Jesolo Trophy	6			4		
2026	European Championships	7	5				5
2026	Mediterranean Games	2nd place, silver medalist(s)	2nd place, silver medalist(s)		4	2nd place, silver medalist(s)	2nd place, silver medalist(s)
2026	World Championships	13	8				R3
