= Roxana Popa =

Spanish artistic gymnast

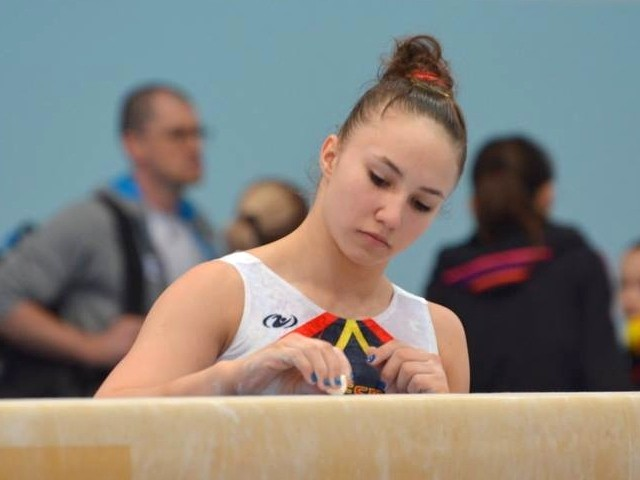
- Popa in 2014

Personal information
- Full name: Roxana Daniela Popa Nedelcu
- Nickname: Roxi
- Born: 2 June 1997 (age 29) Constanța, Constanța County, Dobruja, Romania
- Height: 1.51 m (4 ft 11 in)

Gymnastics career
- Discipline: Women's artistic gymnastics
- Country represented: Spain; (2012–2016, 2019–2024)
- Club: Los Cantos Alcorcon
- Gym: CARD
- Head coach: Lucia Guisado
- Retired: 30 May 2024
Medal record
Representing Spain
FIG World Cup
| Event | 1st | 2nd | 3rd |
|---|---|---|---|
| All-Around World Cup | 0 | 1 | 0 |

Roxana Daniela Popa Nedelcu (born 2 June 1997) is a Romanian-born Spanish artistic gymnast. As member of the Spain women's national gymnastics team, she competed at the 2013, 2014, 2015 and 2019 World Championships, as well as the 2020 Summer Olympics.

== Early life ==
Popa was born on 2 June 1997 in Constanța, Romania, and began gymnastics when she was four years old. She moved to Madrid with her family when she was six years old. She competed at the Spanish Championships in 2008, and despite winning every event, she did not receive any medals as she did not yet have her Spanish citizenship. This was featured in a documentary by Informe Robinson. In mid-2008 she received Spanish citizenship.

After she was finally cleared to compete for Spain, she sustained an elbow injury training on uneven bars, which required two surgeries and intensive rehab, leaving her out of competition for a few years.

== Junior career ==
Popa represented Spain at the 2012 European Championships. She qualified for the all-around and vault final and was a third reserve for the floor final. She ended up placing sixth in the vault final and eleventh in the all-around.

== Senior career ==
=== 2013 ===
Popa's senior debut came in 2013, at the Cottbus World Cup, where she did not make any event finals. Later that month, she was named to the Spanish team for the European Championships. While there, she qualified fifth in the all-around and seventh in the floor exercise final. She placed sixth in the all-around final and seventh on floor exercise. In June, she competed in the Mediterranean Games and finished fifth in the uneven bars final. She was named to the Spanish team for the World Championships at the end of summer. During qualifications, Popa qualified tenth for the all-around final, but missed out on the event finals. She placed twelfth in the all-around final. After the World Championships, she won the all-around gold medal at the Mexico Open ahead of Americans Maggie Nichols and Peyton Ernst. She ended that season at the Glasgow World Cup where she finished fifth.

=== 2014 ===
In early 2014, Popa was announced as a competitor for the American Cup taking place on March 1 and the Tokyo World Cup on April 5–6. She finished sixth in the all-around at the American Cup due to mistakes on the uneven bars. At the Tokyo World Cup, she finished in second place behind Vanessa Ferrari of Italy after falling off the balance beam. Later that month she competed at a friendly meet against gymnasts from Great Britain and Germany, winning all-around gold and team bronze. In early May, she competed at the Spanish Cup, winning every event except the balance beam, on which she finished in fifth place. A few weeks later, she competed at the European Championships, placing sixth with her team, seventh on floor exercise, and eighth on uneven bars. Then in July, she competed at the Spanish Nationals, winning the all-around title and gold on every individual event except balance beam, where she won silver. At the World Championships she finished thirteenth in the all-around final.

After the World Championships, Popa won the all-around gold at the Joaquin Blume Memorial. She was scheduled to compete at the Mexico Open and was considered the front-runner to win, but suffered a knee injury in training the morning of the competition and withdrew. The injury was diagnosed as a torn ACL and meniscus rip and required surgery. Upon diagnosis, her doctors discovered the injury was an old one and had gone unnoticed until December.

=== 2015–18 ===
Popa returned to competition in October 2015, competing at the Novara Cup on the uneven bars. The Spanish team finished fourth, and Popa had the third-highest score on the uneven bars behind Jessica López and Larisa Iordache. Later that month, she represented Spain at the World Championships but only competed on uneven bars. The Spanish team finished seventeenth in the qualification round.

Popa was scheduled to compete at the Olympic Test Event in April 2016; however, in March she re-injured her right knee causing a meniscus rupture which prevented her from qualifying to the 2016 Olympic Games. She underwent arthroscopic surgery on her meniscus, and two months later, she had another surgery on her meniscus. In 2017, she had a third surgery to rebuild her right ACL. She was told by doctors that she would not be able to compete again.

=== 2019 ===
Popa did not compete for three years. In January 2019, she announced that she would make her comeback at the Spanish League. She only competed on the balance beam at the 1st Spanish League, helping her club finish sixth. Then at the 2nd Spanish League, she competed on the uneven bars where she had the third-highest score, and her club finished fifth. She also placed third on the uneven bars at the 3rd Spanish League. At the Spanish League Finals, she vaulted for the first time since 2014 and placed third, and she won gold on the uneven bars. She competed in the all-around for the first time since 2014 at the Spanish Championships. She finished fourth all-around, and she won a silver medal on the uneven bars behind Ana Pérez.

Popa made her international comeback at the Szombathely Challenge Cup where she won bronze on the uneven bars. She next competed at the 2nd Heerenveen Friendly where she helped Spain finish second behind the Netherlands, and individually, she placed ninth in the all-around.

At the 2019 World Championships, Popa, alongside teammates Cintia Rodríguez, Alba Petisco, Ana Pérez, and Marina González, finished twelfth as a team during qualifications. Although they did not qualify to the team final, they qualified a team to the 2020 Olympic Games in Tokyo, giving Spain its first team berth at the Olympic Games since 2004. Individually, Popa qualified for the floor exercise final where she finished sixth. After the World Championships, she only competed on the balance beam at the 1st Spanish League, and her club finished eighth.

=== 2020–21 ===
Popa was scheduled to compete at the 2020 American Cup but withdrew; she was replaced by Alba Petisco. In February, she had the highest score on the uneven bars and the third highest score on the balance beam at the 2nd Spanish League.

In June of 2021, Popa won the gold medal on floor at the FIT Challenge. She was selected to the Spanish women's artistic gymnastics team for the postponed 2020 Summer Olympics alongside Marina González, Alba Petisco and Laura Bechdejú. The team finished twelfth in qualifications and did not reach the final. Individually, Popa qualified for the all-around final where she finished twenty-second.

After the Olympic Games, Popa competed at the 2nd Spanish League where she had the highest scores on the vault, uneven bars, and balance beam and helped her club win the silver medal. Then at the 3rd Spanish League, she had the highest scores on the uneven bars and balance beam. She then won the all-around title at the Spanish Championships. At the Spanish League Finals, she won gold on the uneven bars and helped her club finish second.

=== 2022–24 ===
In November 2022, Popa returned to competition at the 1st Spanish League. She only competed on the uneven bars and had the third-highest score. Then in February 2023, she competed on the uneven bars and balance beam at the 2nd Spanish League, helping her club finish fourth.

Popa announced her retirement from gymnastics on her instagram on May 30, 2024.

== Personal life ==
Besides her native language, Romanian, Popa is also fluent in Spanish and English. Her idols are Romanian gymnasts Nadia Comăneci, Cătălina Ponor, and Larisa Iordache.

In addition to gymnastics, Popa has been involved in dancing since she was seven years old, and has competed in national-level competitions. She taught dance at a school in Madrid while recovering from her knee injuries.

Popa shared that during her three year hiatus from gymnastics due to knee injuries, she struggled with depression.

== Competitive History ==
Competitive history of Roxana Popa
| Year | Event | Team | AA | VT | UB | BB | FX |
2012
| 2012 | Junior European Championships | 11 | 11 | 6 | | | |
| 2013 | Cottbus World Cup | | | | R3 | | |
| 2013 | European Championships | | 6 | | | | 7 |
| 2013 | Mediterranean Games | | | | 5 | | |
| 2013 | World Championships | | 12 | | | | |
| 2013 | Mexico Open | | 1st place, gold medalist(s) | | | | |
| 2013 | Glasgow World Cup | | 5 | | | | |
| 2014 | American Cup | | 6 | | | | |
| 2014 | Tokyo World Cup | | 2nd place, silver medalist(s) | | | | |
| 2014 | Munich Friendly | 3rd place, bronze medalist(s) | 1st place, gold medalist(s) | | | | |
| 2014 | Spanish Cup | 1st place, gold medalist(s) | 1st place, gold medalist(s) | 1st place, gold medalist(s) | 1st place, gold medalist(s) | 5 | 1st place, gold medalist(s) |
| 2014 | European Championships | 6 | | | 8 | | 7 |
| 2014 | Spanish Championships | | 1st place, gold medalist(s) | 1st place, gold medalist(s) | 1st place, gold medalist(s) | 2nd place, silver medalist(s) | 1st place, gold medalist(s) |
| 2014 | Novara Cup | | 2nd place, silver medalist(s) | | | | |
| 2014 | World Championships | | 13 | | | | |
| 2014 | Joaquim Blume Memorial | | 1st place, gold medalist(s) | | | | |
| 2015 | Novara Cup | 4 | | | 3rd place, bronze medalist(s) | | |
| 2015 | World Championships | 17 | | | | | |
| 2019 | 1st Spanish League | 6 | | | | | |
| 2019 | 2nd Spanish League | 5 | | | 3rd place, bronze medalist(s) | | |
| 2019 | 3rd Spanish League | | | | 3rd place, bronze medalist(s) | | |
| 2019 | Spanish League Final | | | 3rd place, bronze medalist(s) | 1st place, gold medalist(s) | | |
| 2019 | Spanish Championships | | 4 | | 2nd place, silver medalist(s) | | |
| 2019 | Szombathely Challenge Cup | | | | 3rd place, bronze medalist(s) | | |
| 2019 | 2nd Heerenveen Friendly | 2nd place, silver medalist(s) | 9 | | | | |
| 2019 | World Championships | R4 | | | | | 6 |
| 2019 | 1st Spanish League | 8 | | | | | |
| 2020 | 2nd Spanish League | 6 | | 1st place, gold medalist(s) | 3rd place, bronze medalist(s) | | |
| 2021 | FIT Challenge | 5 | 17 | | | | 1st place, gold medalist(s) |
| 2021 | Olympic Games | 12 | 22 | | | | |
| 2021 | 2nd Spanish League | 2nd place, silver medalist(s) | | 1st place, gold medalist(s) | 1st place, gold medalist(s) | 1st place, gold medalist(s) | |
| 2021 | 3rd Spanish League | 2nd place, silver medalist(s) | | 2nd place, silver medalist(s) | 1st place, gold medalist(s) | 1st place, gold medalist(s) | |
| 2021 | Spanish Championships | | 1st place, gold medalist(s) | 2nd place, silver medalist(s) | 1st place, gold medalist(s) | 1st place, gold medalist(s) | 6 |
| 2021 | Spanish League Finals | 2nd place, silver medalist(s) | | | 1st place, gold medalist(s) | | |
| 2022 | 1st Spanish League | 5 | | | 3rd place, bronze medalist(s) | | |
| 2022 | 2nd Spanish League | 4 | | | 2nd place, silver medalist(s) | 3rd place, bronze medalist(s) | |
