= Cintia Rodríguez =

Spanish artistic gymnast

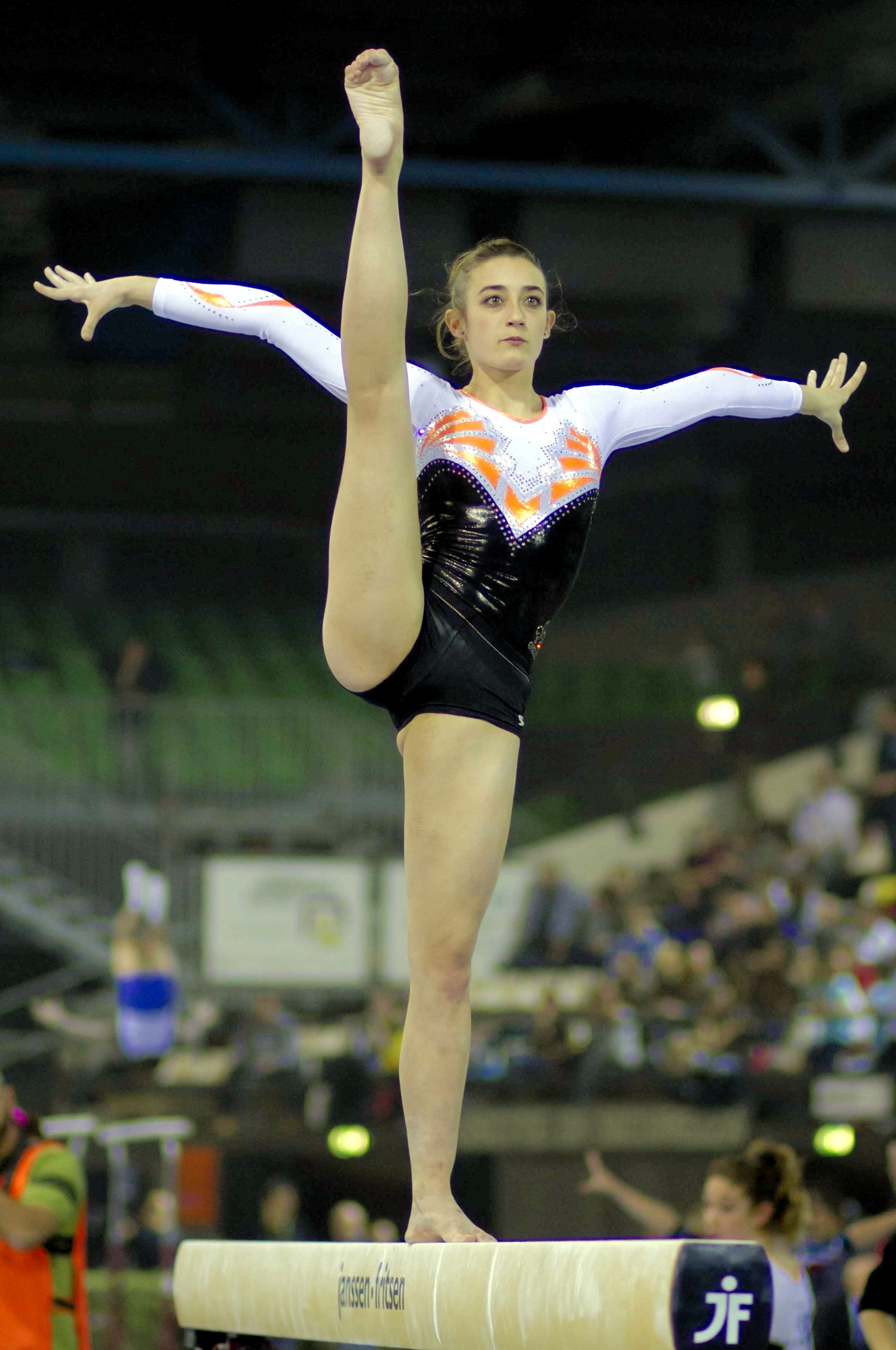

Personal information
- Full name: Cintia Rodríguez Rodríguez
- Born: 16 November 1994 (age 31) Inca, Spain

Gymnastics career
- Country represented: Spain (2010–2022 (ESP))
- Club: Club Esportiu Xelska
- Head coach: Pedro Mir
- Retired: 15 November 2022
Medal record
Representing Spain
Women's artistic gymnastics
Event / 1st / 2nd / 3rd; FIG World Cup / 0 / 2 / 0
Mediterranean Games
Bronze medal – third place	2018 Tarragona	Team
Bronze medal – third place	2018 Tarragona	Floor Exercise

Cintia Rodríguez Rodríguez (born 16 November 1994) is a retired Spanish artistic gymnast. She helped Spain qualify a women's team for the 2020 Summer Olympics through her performances at the 2019 World Artistic Gymnastics Championships, marking the first time Spain have sent a women's team since Athens 2004.

Rodríguez was part of the Spanish team that won the bronze medal at the 2018 Mediterranean Games. She also won an individual bronze medal on the floor exercise.

== Personal life ==
Rodríguez was born in Inca, Mallorca, and took up gymnastics at age 3, inspired by her sister. Rodriguez studies criminology through the National University of Distance Education. She enjoys cycling in her free time and is a fan of road bicycle racing. She speaks Catalan, English and Italian in addition to Spanish.

== Career ==
=== 2010–2012 ===
Rodríguez represented Spain at the 2010 World Championships in Rotterdam, Netherlands, but did not make any finals.

In 2011, she placed seventh in the all-around at the Spanish National Championships. Later that year, she competed at the Spain vs Italy Friendly, placing first with the Spanish team and finishing seventh in the all-around with the score of 53.100.

=== 2013–2016 ===
Rodríguez competed at the 2013 World Championships in Antwerp, Belgium. She placed 44th in qualifications with the all-around score of 50.266.

In 2014, Rodríguez won the bronze medal in the all-around at the Spanish National Championships behind Roxana Popa and Maria Paula Vargas. She also won the gold medal on the balance beam at the 2014 Spanish Cup and placed second in the all-around. She competed with the Spanish team at the 2014 World Championships in Nanning, China.

=== 2017–2021 ===
In 2017, Rodríguez became the Spanish national champion on the balance beam, and earned the bronze medal on floor and in the all-around. She also won gold on floor at the Spanish Cup that year, and represented Spain at the 2017 World Championships in Montreal, Canada.

In June 2018, Rodríguez competed at the 2018 Mediterranean Games in Tarragona, Catalonia, Spain. Her scores helped Spain take the bronze medal in the team final behind Italy and France. She also placed third in the floor final behind Lara Mori of Italy and Göksu Üçtaş Şanlı of Turkey. In July, she became the Spanish national champion on floor and placed third in the all-around. In September, she won the silver on both the balance beam and the floor exercise at the Szombathely World Challenge Cup in Hungary, and went on to compete at the 2018 World Championships in Doha, Qatar.

In April 2019, Rodríguez competed at the 2019 European Championships in Szczecin, Poland, where she placed 21st in the all-around final. In June, she represented Spain at the 2019 European Games in Minsk, Belarus. At the 2019 World Championships, held in Stuttgart, Germany, Rodríguez, alongside teammates Roxana Popa, Alba Petisco, Ana Pérez, and Marina González, finished 12th as a team during qualifications. Although they did not advance to the team final, they qualified a team to the 2020 Olympics in Tokyo, marking the first time Spain qualified a women's gymnastics team to the Olympic Games since 2004.

In June 2021, Rodríguez announced that she will miss the postponed 2020 Summer Olympics due to a knee injury.

=== 2022 ===
On 15 November 2022 Rodriguez announced her retirement from the sport of gymnastics.
