= European Artistic Gymnastics Championships – Women's vault =

The vault event at the European Women's Artistic Gymnastics Championships was first held in 1957.

Three medals are awarded: gold for first place, silver for second place, and bronze for third place. Tie breakers have not been used in every year. In the event of a tie between two gymnasts, both names are listed, and the following position (second for a tie for first, third for a tie for second) is left empty because a medal was not awarded for that position. If three gymnastics tied for a position, the following two positions are left empty.

Giulia Steingruber, with three golds, one silver, and one bronze, holds the records for most gold medals and most total medals in this event.

== Medalists ==
Year	Location	Gold	Silver	Bronze
1957	(Romania) Bucharest	(Soviet Union) Larisa Latynina	(Soviet Union) Tamara Manina	(Romania) Sonia Iovan
1959	(Poland) Kraków	(Poland) Natalia Kot	(Czechoslovakia) Věra Čáslavská	(East Germany) Ingrid Föst
1961	(East Germany) Leipzig	(East Germany) Ute Starke	(East Germany) Ingrid Föst	(Poland) Natalia Kot
1963	(France) Paris	(Sweden) Solveig Egman-Andersson	(Netherlands) Thea Belmer	(Netherlands) Jannie Vierstra
1965	(Bulgaria) Sofia	(Czechoslovakia) Věra Čáslavská	(East Germany) Ute Starke	(Soviet Union) Larisa Latynina
1967	(Netherlands) Amsterdam	(Czechoslovakia) Věra Čáslavská	(East Germany) Erika Zuchold	(East Germany) Karin Büttner-Janz
1969	(Sweden) Landskrona	(East Germany) Karin Büttner-Janz	(East Germany) Erika Zuchold	(Soviet Union) Olga Karasyova
1971	(Soviet Union) Minsk	(Soviet Union) Ludmilla Tourischeva	(Soviet Union) Tamara Lazakovich	(East Germany) Erika Zuchold
1973	(United Kingdom) London	(East Germany) Angelika Hellmann (Soviet Union) Ludmilla Tourischeva	None awarded	(West Germany) Uta Schorn
1975	(Norway) Skien	(Romania) Nadia Comăneci	(East Germany) Richarda Schmeißer	(Soviet Union) Nellie Kim (Romania) Alina Goreac
1977	(Czechoslovakia) Prague	(Soviet Union) Nellie Kim	(Romania) Nadia Comăneci	(Soviet Union) Elena Mukhina
1979	(Denmark) Copenhagen	(Romania) Nadia Comăneci	(East Germany) Maxi Gnauck	(Soviet Union) Natalia Shaposhnikova
1981	(Spain) Madrid	(Romania) Cristina Elena Grigoraș	(East Germany) Maxi Gnauck (East Germany) Birgit Senff	None awarded
1983	(Sweden) Gothenburg	(Soviet Union) Olga Bicherova	(Romania) Ecaterina Szabo	(Romania) Lavinia Agache (Bulgaria) Boriana Stoyanova
1985	(Finland) Helsinki	(Soviet Union) Elena Shushunova	(Romania) Ecaterina Szabo	(East Germany) Dagmar Kersten
1987	(Soviet Union) Moscow	(Soviet Union) Yelena Shushunova	(Romania) Daniela Silivaș	(Romania) Eugenia Golea
1989	(Belgium) Brussels	(Soviet Union) Svetlana Boginskaya	(Bulgaria) Milena Mavrodieva	(Romania) Cristina Bontaș
1990	(Greece) Athens	(Soviet Union) Svetlana Boginskaya	(Romania) Cristina Bontaș	(Spain) Eva Rueda
1992	(France) Nantes	(Ukraine) Tatiana Gutsu	(Romania) Gina Gogean	(Bulgaria) Silvia Mitova
1994	(Sweden) Stockholm	(Romania) Lavinia Miloșovici	(Belarus) Elena Piskun	(Ukraine) Lilia Podkopayeva
1996	(United Kingdom) Birmingham	(Romania) Simona Amânar	(Romania) Gina Gogean	(Ukraine) Lilia Podkopayeva
1998	(Russia) Saint Petersburg	(Hungary) Adrienn Varga	(Romania) Maria Olaru (Romania) Simona Amânar	None awarded
2000	(France) Paris	(Romania) Simona Amânar	(Russia) Elena Zamolodchikova	(Spain) Esther Moya
2002	(Greece) Patras	(Russia) Natalia Ziganshina	(Netherlands) Verona van de Leur	(Romania) Oana Petrovschi
2004	(Netherlands) Amsterdam	(Romania) Monica Roșu	(Russia) Anna Pavlova (Russia) Elena Zamolodchikova	None awarded
2005	(Hungary) Debrecen	(Italy) Francesca Benolli	(Russia) Anna Pavlova	(Belgium) Aagje Vanwalleghem
2006	(Greece) Volos	(Russia) Anna Grudko	(Ukraine) Olga Sherbatykh	(Germany) Katja Abel
2007	(Netherlands) Amsterdam	(Italy) Carlotta Giovannini	(Germany) Oksana Chusovitina	(Russia) Anna Grudko
2008	(France) Clermont-Ferrand	(Germany) Oksana Chusovitina	(Italy) Carlotta Giovannini	(Italy) Francesca Benolli
2009	(Italy) Milan	(Switzerland) Ariella Käslin	(Russia) Yulia Berger	(Ukraine) Anna Kalashnyk
2010	(United Kingdom) Birmingham	(Russia) Ekaterina Kurbatova	(France) Youna Dufournet	(Russia) Tatiana Nabieva
2011	(Germany) Berlin	(Romania) Sandra Izbașa	(Germany) Oksana Chusovitina	(Switzerland) Ariella Käslin
2012	(Belgium) Brussels	(Romania) Sandra Izbașa	(Germany) Oksana Chusovitina	(Switzerland) Giulia Steingruber
2013	(Russia) Moscow	(Switzerland) Giulia Steingruber	(Romania) Larisa Iordache (Netherlands) Noël van Klaveren	None awarded
2014	(Bulgaria) Sofia	(Switzerland) Giulia Steingruber	(Azerbaijan) Anna Pavlova	(Romania) Larisa Iordache
2015	(France) Montpellier	(Russia) Maria Paseka	(Switzerland) Giulia Steingruber	(Russia) Ksenia Afanasyeva
2016	(Switzerland) Bern	(Switzerland) Giulia Steingruber	(United Kingdom) Ellie Downie	(Russia) Ksenia Afanasyeva
2017	(Romania) Cluj-Napoca	(France) Coline Devillard	(United Kingdom) Ellie Downie	(Hungary) Boglárka Dévai
2018	(Scotland) Glasgow	(Hungary) Boglárka Dévai	(Russia) Angelina Melnikova	(Romania) Denisa Golgotă
2019	(Poland) Szczecin	(Russia) Maria Paseka	(France) Coline Devillard	(United Kingdom) Ellie Downie
2020	(Turkey) Mersin	(Hungary) Zsófia Kovács	(Romania) Larisa Iordache	(Ukraine) Anastasiia Motak
2021	(Switzerland) Basel	(Switzerland) Giulia Steingruber	(United Kingdom) Jessica Gadirova	(Russia) Angelina Melnikova
2022	(Germany) Munich	(Hungary) Zsófia Kovács	(Italy) Asia D'Amato	(France) Aline Friess
2023	(Turkey) Antalya	(France) Coline Devillard	(Italy) Asia D'Amato	(Belgium) Lisa Vaelen
2024	(Italy) Rimini	(France) Coline Devillard	(Bulgaria) Valentina Georgieva	(France) Ming van Eijken
2025	(Germany) Leipzig	(Germany) Karina Schönmaier	(Bulgaria) Valentina Georgieva	(Belgium) Lisa Vaelen
2026	(Croatia) Zagreb	(Russia) Angelina Melnikova	(Germany) Karina Schönmaier	(Belgium) Lisa Vaelen

== Medal table ==
Rank	Nation	Gold	Silver	Bronze	Total
1	Romania (ROU)	9	11	8	28
2	Soviet Union (URS)	9	2	5	16
3	Russia (RUS)	6	6	5	17
4	Switzerland (SUI)	5	1	2	8
5	Hungary (HUN)	4	0	1	5
6	East Germany (GDR)	3	8	4	15
7	France (FRA)	3	2	2	7
8	Germany (GER)	2	4	1	7
9	Italy (ITA)	2	3	1	6
10	Czechoslovakia (TCH)	2	1	0	3
11	Ukraine (UKR)	1	1	4	6
12	Poland (POL)	1	0	1	2
13	Sweden (SWE)	1	0	0	1
14	Bulgaria (BUL)	0	3	2	5
15	Great Britain (GBR)	0	3	1	4
15	Netherlands (NED)	0	3	1	4
17	Azerbaijan (AZE)	0	1	0	1
17	Belarus (BLR)	0	1	0	1
19	Belgium (BEL)	0	0	4	4
20	Spain (ESP)	0	0	2	2
21	West Germany (FRG)	0	0	1	1
Totals (21 entries)		48	50	45	143

Notes

- At the 2026 European Championships, the Croatian government banned the use of Russian flags and emblems despite World Gymnastics lifting the ban on Russian athletes; therefore the Russian team competed under the banner World Gymnastics 2. Their results here are attributed to Russia.
