= Lorette Charpy =

French artistic gymnast (born 2001)

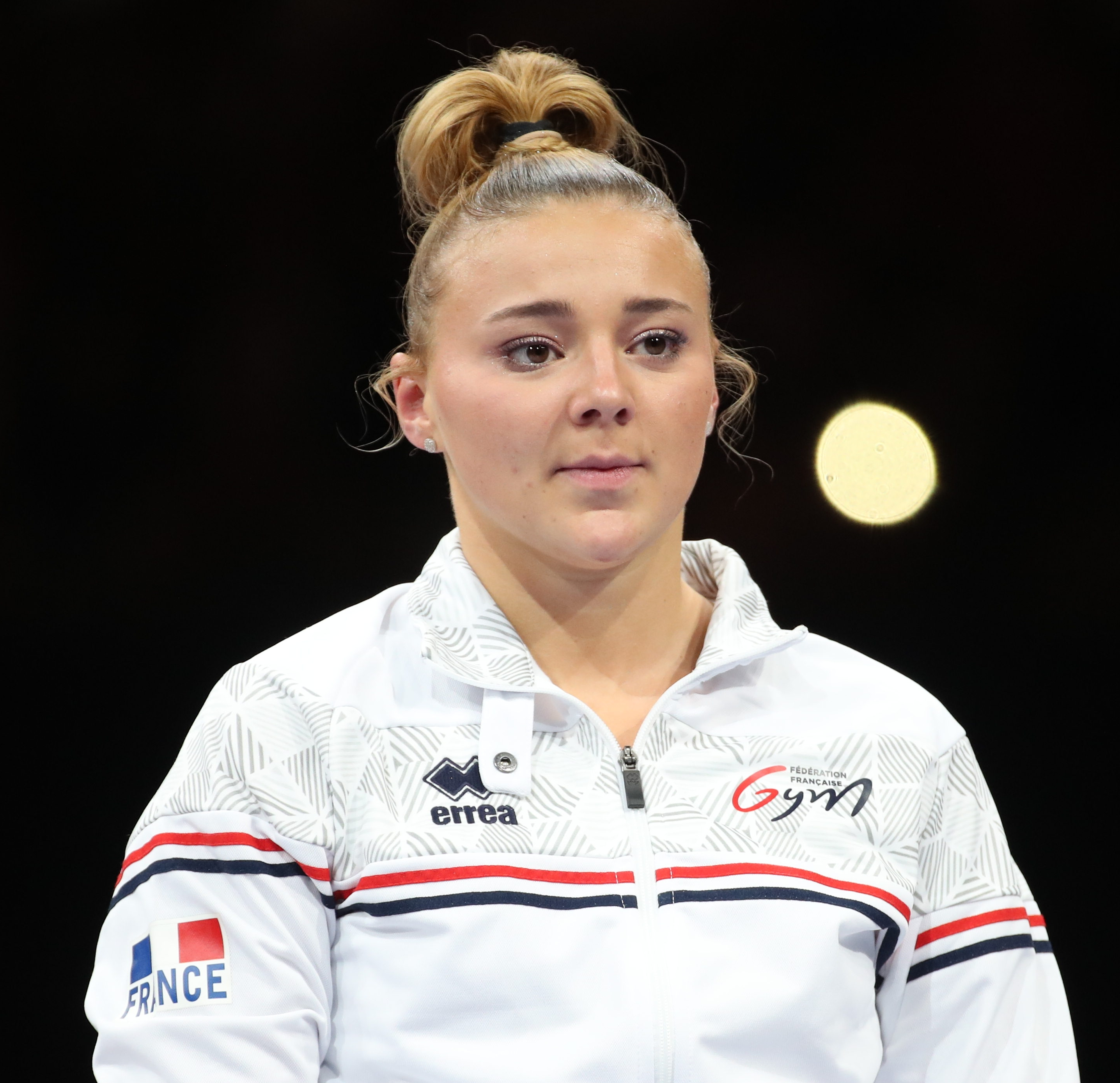
- Charpy at the 2022 European Championships

Personal information
- Full name: Lorette Eugenie Adrienne Margue Charpy
- Nickname: Lo-Lo
- Born: December 3, 2001 (age 24) Annonay, France

Gymnastics career
- Discipline: Women's artistic gymnastics
- Country represented: France; (2014–present)
- Club: Independante Stephanoise
- Gym: SA Mérignac Gymnastique
- Head coach: Mickael Pallares
- Former coaches: Eric Hagard, Monique Hagard, Martine Georges, Alisée Dal Santo, Jérome Martin, Tara Duncanson, Frédéric Jay
- Choreographer: Grégory Milan
Medal record
Representing France
World Championships
Bronze medal – third place	2023 Antwerp	Team
European Games
Silver medal – second place	2019 Minsk	All-around
European Championships
Silver medal – second place	2018 Glasgow	Team
Bronze medal – third place	2019 Szczecin	Balance beam
Bronze medal – third place	2022 Munich	Uneven bars
Bronze medal – third place	2024 Rimini	Team
Bronze medal – third place	2025 Leipzig	Team
Bronze medal – third place	2026 Zagreb	Team
Mediterranean Games
Silver medal – second place	2022 Oran	Team
FIG World Cup
Event	1st	2nd	3rd
Apparatus World Cup	1	1	0
World Challenge Cup	0	0	1
Total	1	1	1

Lorette Charpy (born December 3, 2001) is a French artistic gymnast. She was part of the bronze medal-winning team at the 2023 World Championships and the silver medal winning team at the 2018 European Championships. Individually she is the 2019 European Games all-around silver medalist, 2019 European Championships bronze medalist on the balance beam, and 2022 European Championships bronze medalist on the uneven bars.

== Early life and education ==
Charpy began training gymnastics at two and a half years old and grew up in the gym, where her mother was a coach and her two older sisters were already training.

She is currently studying for a Master's degree focused on high performance and the mental dimension of elite sport.

== Gymnastics career ==
=== 2012–2016 ===
Charpy joined the French national team at age ten in 2012. In 2015, she placed first in all-around, second on uneven bars, and third on balance beam in the junior category at the French Championships.

At the 2016 Junior European Championships, Charpy helped the French team finish fifth. Individually she won bronze on the uneven bars and placed twelfth in the all-around and fourth on balance beam.

=== 2017–2021 ===
Charpy became age eligible for senior level competition in 2017. She won gold on uneven bars and bronze in floor exercise at the 2017 French Championships, narrowly missing the podium with fourth on balance beam and fifth in all-around.

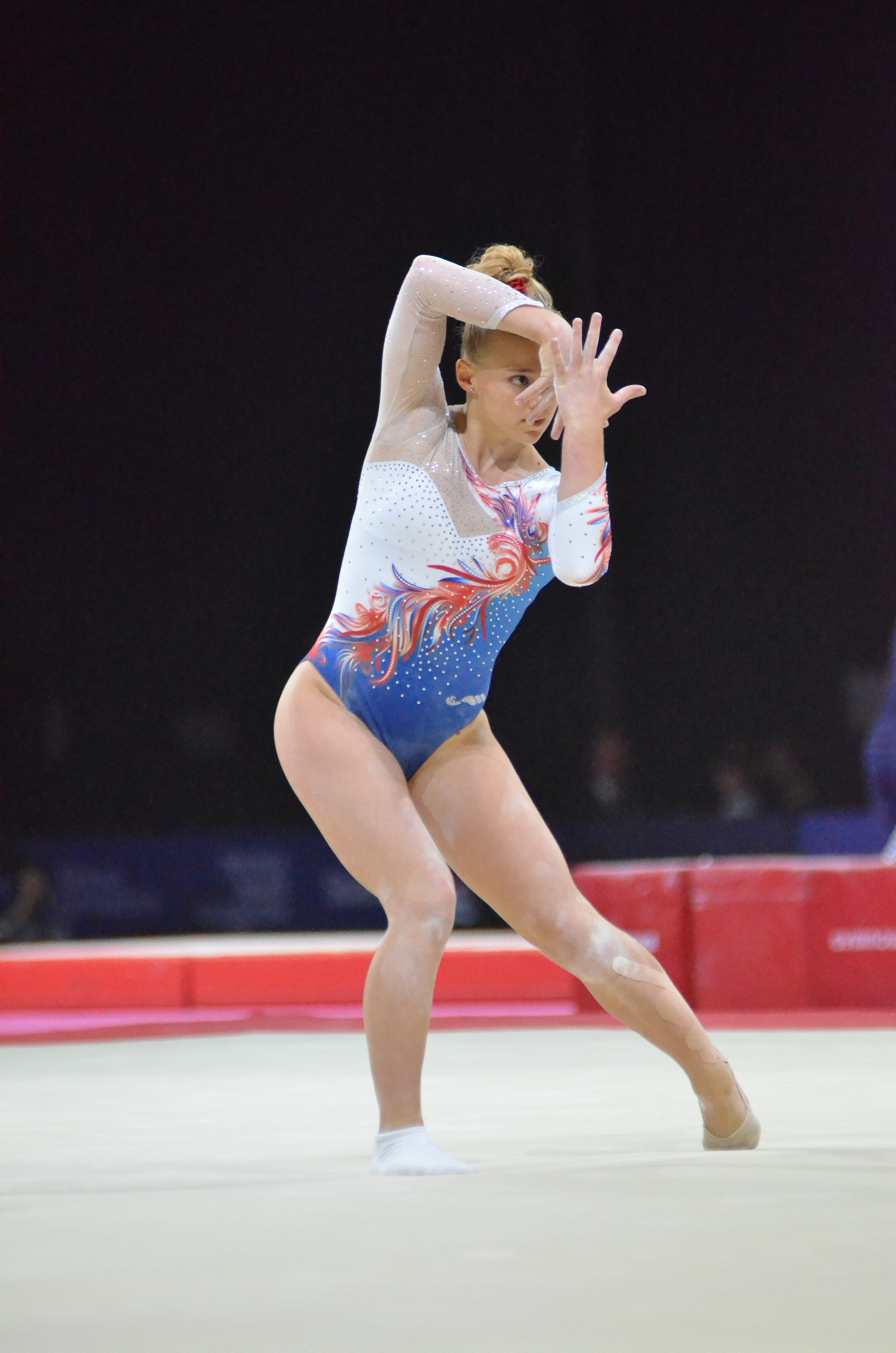
Charpy at the 2018 European Championships

Charpy competed at the 2018 American Cup where she placed fourth. At the 2018 French Championships, she placed third in the all-around, first on balance beam, and third on floor exercise. At the 2018 European Championships she won silver with the French team and placed sixth on uneven bars. Charpy was injured in August 2018, fracturing her face in a fall from the uneven bars. She had surgery and missed training while recovering. At the 2018 World Championships, Charpy finished sixteenth in the all-around and contributed to France's fifth place as a team.

Charpy was selected to participate in the 2019 European Championships alongside Marine Boyer, Mélanie de Jesus dos Santos, and Coline Devillard. In qualifications, Charpy qualified for the all-around, uneven bars, and balance beam finals. She ended up placing eighth in the all-around final with a score of 52.433. She finished sixth on uneven bars. In the balance beam final, she earned a score of 12.900, which earned the bronze medal, with her teammate de Jesus dos Santos finishing just ahead of her in second place. The bronze medal on balance beam was her first individual European Championships medal at the senior level. Charpy was selected to participate in the 2019 European Games alongside Aline Friess and Carolann Héduit. She qualified to the all-around final in third place. During the final she ended up in second place behind Angelina Melnikova. She also had the highest balance beam score in the all-around final out of all 18 competitors with a score of 13.700.

Charpy was named to the 2019 World Championships team alongside Marine Boyer, Aline Friess, Mélanie de Jesus dos Santos, and Claire Pontlevoy. While there, she competed in team qualifications on three events. In the team final, Charpy helped France to a fifth place finish. Charpy ended the year competing at the Arthur Gander Memorial where she placed first in the three-event all-around.

Charpy competed at the 2020 American Cup where she finished eighth. The remainder of the competitive season was cut short due to the global COVID-19 pandemic. In March 2021, Charpy tore her ACL and was therefore unable to contend for a spot on France's Olympic team.

=== 2022–2024 ===
Charpy made her return to competition at the 2022 Baku World Cup where she qualified to three event finals. She won gold on the uneven bars and silver on the balance beam behind Sarah Voss. Additionally she placed fourth on floor exercise. In June, Charpy competed at the Mediterranean Games, where the French team won the silver medal behind Italy. However, Charpy reinjured her knee and withdrew from the individual finals. She returned to competition in August at the 2022 European Championships, where France finished sixth in the team final. Individually, Charpy won the bronze medal on the uneven bars behind Elisabeth Seitz and Alice D'Amato. In late August, Charpy announced that she had torn her ACL for the second time.

Charpy returned to competition at the 2023 Paris Challenge Cup in September, only competing on the uneven bars. She was named to the team to compete at the World Championships alongside Marine Boyer, Mélanie de Jesus dos Santos, Coline Devillard, and Morgane Osyssek. At the World Championships, Charpy contributed a score on the uneven bars towards France's surprise bronze medal win – France's first team medal since 1950. Individually Charpy qualified to the uneven bars final, her first apparatus event final at a World Championships, where she finished ninth.

Charpy competed at the 2024 European Championships, helping the French team win bronze. She was not selected to represent France at the 2024 Olympic Games.

=== 2025–present ===
Charpy competing a Pak salto at the 2026 Swiss Cup

Charpy competed at the 2025 European Championships where she helped the French team win bronze. Individually she placed fifth in the all-around and on balance beam. She next competed at the 2025 Paris World Challenge Cup where she won bronze on the uneven bars and placed fifth on balance beam. She ended the year competing at the 2025 World Championships where she was the first reserve for the all-around final.

Charpy at the 2026 World Championships

At the 2026 European Championships, Charpy helped France win their third consecutive team bronze medal. While there, she was awarded the Shooting Star Award, which "aims to put a gymnast with an exceptional story in the spotlight, someone who is an inspiration for the future generation of gymnasts and the general public alike". At the 2026 World Championships, Charpy helped France place fourth as a team. She ended the year competing at the Arthur Gander Memorial and the 2026 Swiss Cup. At the former, she placed fourth in the three-event all-around. At the latter, she helped the French team win for the second consecutive year.

== Personal life ==
Charpy's mother is a gymnastics coach. She has two sisters, Serena and Grâce, who have also trained in gymnastics.

Charpy speaks English and Spanish in addition to her native French. She enjoys dancing, painting and cooking as hobbies.

== Competitive history ==
Competitive history of Lorette Charpy at the junior level
Year	Event	Team	AA	VT	UB	BB	FX
2014	French Championships	7					
2015	French Championships		1st place, gold medalist(s)		3rd place, bronze medalist(s)	3rd place, bronze medalist(s)	
2015	Flanders Intl Team Challenge	4					
2015	Elite Gym Massilia		2nd place, silver medalist(s)				
2016	International Gymnix	6	25		4		
2016	Züri GymDays	2nd place, silver medalist(s)	10				
2016	France vs Romania Friendly	2nd place, silver medalist(s)	1st place, gold medalist(s)	7	1st place, gold medalist(s)	4	6
2016	European Championships	5	12		3rd place, bronze medalist(s)	4	4
2016	French Championships		1st place, gold medalist(s)		2nd place, silver medalist(s)	3rd place, bronze medalist(s)	8
2016	French Review		2nd place, silver medalist(s)	4	4	4	2nd place, silver medalist(s)
2016	Joaquim Blume Memorial		4	2nd place, silver medalist(s)	4	4	5
2016	Elite Gym Massilia		4			4	

Charpy (right) on the 2022 European Championships uneven bars medal podium

Competitive history of Lorette Charpy at the senior level
Year	Event	Team	AA	VT	UB	BB	FX
2017	France Top 12	1st place, gold medalist(s)	5				
2017	City of Jesolo Trophy	4	28		6		
2017	French Championships		5		1st place, gold medalist(s)	4	3rd place, bronze medalist(s)
2017	FIT Challenge	2nd place, silver medalist(s)	3rd place, bronze medalist(s)				
2017	Paris Challenge Cup				5		
2017	World Championships				51	15	
2017	Elite Gym Massilia		5		2nd place, silver medalist(s)		
2017	Top 12 Series 2	1st place, gold medalist(s)	1st place, gold medalist(s)	1st place, gold medalist(s)	2nd place, silver medalist(s)	1st place, gold medalist(s)	2nd place, silver medalist(s)
2018	Top 12 Series 3	1st place, gold medalist(s)	1st place, gold medalist(s)	3rd place, bronze medalist(s)	1st place, gold medalist(s)	3rd place, bronze medalist(s)	1st place, gold medalist(s)
2018	Top 12 Series 4	2nd place, silver medalist(s)	1st place, gold medalist(s)	3rd place, bronze medalist(s)	1st place, gold medalist(s)	2nd place, silver medalist(s)	1st place, gold medalist(s)
2018	American Cup		4				
2018	Top 12 Final	3rd place, bronze medalist(s)	1st place, gold medalist(s)		1st place, gold medalist(s)	2nd place, silver medalist(s)	2nd place, silver medalist(s)
2018	City of Jesolo Trophy		9		5		
2018	French Championships|		3rd place, bronze medalist(s)			1st place, gold medalist(s)	2nd place, silver medalist(s)
2018	Sainté Gym Cup	1st place, gold medalist(s)	2nd place, silver medalist(s)	5	3rd place, bronze medalist(s)	2nd place, silver medalist(s)	10
2018	European Championships	2nd place, silver medalist(s)			6		
2018	World Championships	5	16				
2018	Top 12 Series 2	1st place, gold medalist(s)		2nd place, silver medalist(s)	2nd place, silver medalist(s)	1st place, gold medalist(s)	
2019	Top 12 Series 3	1st place, gold medalist(s)		1st place, gold medalist(s)	1st place, gold medalist(s)	1st place, gold medalist(s)	
2019	Stuttgart World Cup		4				
2019	European Championships		8		6	3rd place, bronze medalist(s)	
2019	Top 12 Finals	3rd place, bronze medalist(s)	1st place, gold medalist(s)	2nd place, silver medalist(s)	1st place, gold medalist(s)	1st place, gold medalist(s)	2nd place, silver medalist(s)
2019	French Championships		2nd place, silver medalist(s)		2nd place, silver medalist(s)	2nd place, silver medalist(s)	2nd place, silver medalist(s)
2019	European Games		2nd place, silver medalist(s)		6	6	
2019	Worms Friendly	3rd place, bronze medalist(s)	5	9	5	14	7
2019	Paris Challenge Cup				9		
2019	World Championships	5					
2019	Arthur Gander Memorial		1st place, gold medalist(s)				
2019	Swiss Cup	5					
2020	American Cup		8				
2022	Baku World Cup				1st place, gold medalist(s)	2nd place, silver medalist(s)	6
2022	Mediterranean Games	2nd place, silver medalist(s)	WD		WD		
2022	European Championships	6			3rd place, bronze medalist(s)		
2023
2023	World Championships	3rd place, bronze medalist(s)			9		
2024	City of Jesolo Trophy	5	33				
2024	European Championships	3rd place, bronze medalist(s)					
2025	French Championships		1st place, gold medalist(s)		6	2nd place, silver medalist(s)	
2025	European Championships	3rd place, bronze medalist(s)	5			5	
2025	Paris World Challenge Cup				3rd place, bronze medalist(s)	5	
2025	World Championships	—N/a	R1				
2026	French Championships		6			2nd place, silver medalist(s)	4
2026	European Championships	3rd place, bronze medalist(s)					
2026	World Championships	4					
2026	Arthur Gander Memorial		4				
2026	Swiss Cup	1st place, gold medalist(s)					
