= Gymnastics at the 2019 European Games – Women's artistic individual all-around =

The women's artistic gymnastics all-around final at the 2019 European Games was held at the Minsk Arena on June 29.

== Qualification ==
Qualification took place on June 27. Angelina Melnikova from Russia qualified in first, followed by Great Britain's Georgia-Mae Fenton and Lorette Charpy of France.

The reserves were:

1. Emma Slevin (IRL)
2. Cintia Rodríguez (ESP)
3. Chiara Bunce (SVK)

== Medalists ==
	Gold	Silver	Bronze
All-around	Angelina Melnikova (RUS)	Lorette Charpy (FRA)	Diana Varinska (UKR)

== Results ==
Oldest and youngest competitors

	Name	Country	Date of birth	Age
Youngest	Anastasiya Alistratava	Belarus	October 16, 2003	15 years, 8 months and 13 days
Oldest	Gabriela Janik	Poland	March 10, 1993	26 years, 3 months and 19 days

Rank	Gymnast	Vault (gymnastics)	Uneven bars	Balance beam	Floor (gymnastics)	Total
1st place, gold medalist(s)	Angelina Melnikova (RUS)	14.266	13.966	13.100	13.166	54.498
2nd place, silver medalist(s)	Lorette Charpy (FRA)	13.500	13.866	13.700	13.100	54.166
3rd place, bronze medalist(s)	Diana Varinska (UKR)	13.800	12.700	13.000	13.266	52.766
4	Aline Friess (FRA)	14.800	12.900	12.033	12.966	52.699
5	Aleksandra Shchekoldina (RUS)	14.166	13.333	11.733	13.133	52.365
6	Senna Deriks (BEL)	13.400	13.466	12.733	12.333	51.932
7	Naomi Visser (NED)	13.433	12.266	13.066	12.933	51.698
8	Georgia-Mae Fenton (GBR)	13.000	13.800	11.700	12.566	51.066
9	Bianka Schermann (HUN)	13.233	13.900	11.800	12.000	50.933
10	Aneta Holasová (CZE)	13.500	12.466	12.033	12.933	50.932
11	Denisa Golgotă (ROU)	13.966	10.533	13.433	12.633	50.565
12	Anastasiya Alistratava (BLR)	12.800	13.366	11.533	12.466	50.165
13	Gabriela Janik (POL)	13.600	11.533	12.500	12.400	50.033
14	Anastasia Bachynska (UKR)	13.800	11.266	13.000	11.600	49.666
15	Ana Filipa Martins (POR)	13.000	11.966	11.966	12.600	49.532
16	Elīna Vihrova (LAT)	13.433	12.133	11.066	12.666	49.298
17	Zója Székely (HUN)	13.166	13.366	10.433	11.933	48.898
18	Dominika Ponížilová (CZE)	13.633	12.300	11.166	11.700	48.799
