= Coline Devillard =

French artistic gymnast

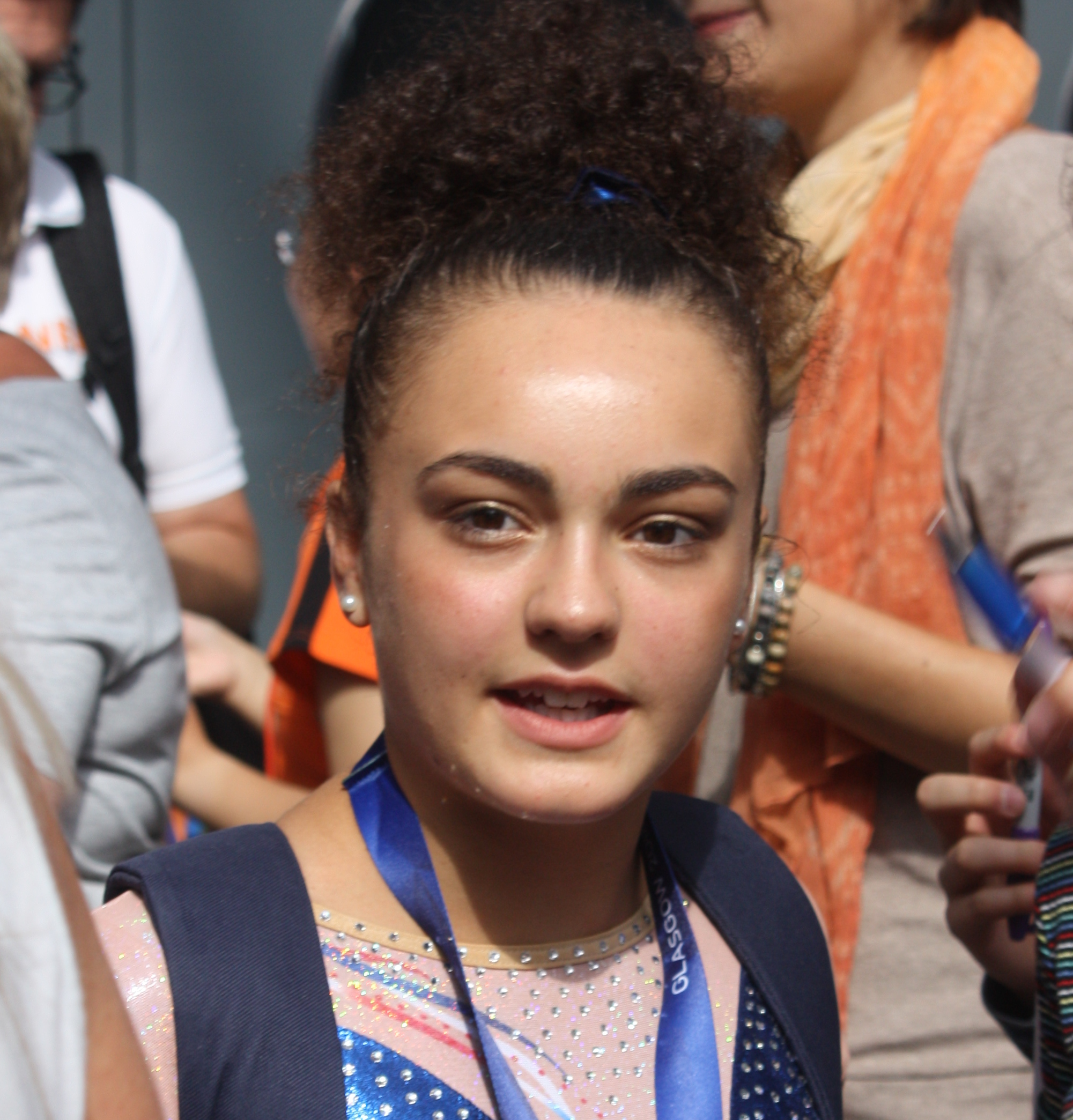
- Devillard at the 2018 European Championships

Personal information
- Nicknames: Coco, Coc's
- Born: 9 October 2000 (age 26) Saint Vallier, France
- Height: 1.48 m (4 ft 10 in)

Gymnastics career
- Discipline: Women's artistic gymnastics
- Country represented: France; (2013–present)
- Club: AL Dijoin (2006-2023) Meaux Gymnastique (2023-)
- Gym: INSEP
- Head coaches: Jérome Martin, Frédéric Jay
- Former coaches: Hong Ma, Jian Fu, Cédric Guille, Nellu Pop, Martine Georges, Alizée Dal Santo, Tara Duncanson
- Choreographer: Grégory Milan
Medal record
Women's artistic gymnastics
Representing France
World Championships
Bronze medal – third place	2022 Liverpool	Vault
Bronze medal – third place	2023 Antwerp	Team
European Championships
Gold medal – first place	2017 Cluj-Napoca	Vault
Gold medal – first place	2023 Antalya	Vault
Gold medal – first place	2024 Rimini	Vault
Silver medal – second place	2018 Glasgow	Team
Silver medal – second place	2019 Szczecin	Vault
Bronze medal – third place	2024 Rimini	Team
FIG World Cup
Event	1st	2nd	3rd
Apparatus World Cup	2	1	2
World Challenge Cup	3	1	0
Total	5	2	2

Coline Devillard (born 9 October 2000) is a French artistic gymnast. Devillard is the 2022 World bronze medalist, the 2017, 2023, 2024 European champion and the 2019 European silver medalist on vault. She is the first and only French female gymnast to win the European title on vault. Additionally she was part of the French teams that won silver at the 2018 European Championships and bronze at the 2023 World Championships. She competed in the 2024 Summer Olympics.

== Personal life ==
Coline Devillard was born in Saint-Vallier, Saône-et-Loire, France, on 9 October 2000. Her hobbies include shopping, and she hopes to become a fitness trainer.

== Junior career ==
=== 2012–2013 ===
Devillard's international debut was at the 2012 Élite Gym Massilia where she placed sixth with her team and fifteenth in the all-around. She did not compete during the 2013 season.

=== 2014 ===
Devillard competed at the French National Championships and finished eighth in the all-around with a score of 49.500. She competed at the International Tournoi Combs-la-Ville and won gold on vault and beam and won bronze with the team. Additionally, she placed fifth in the all-around and fourth on floor.

=== 2015 ===
At the National Championships, Devillard won a silver medal on vault behind Camille Bahl, and she finished twelfth in the junior all-around final. Devillard won a gold medal with the French team at the FRA-GBR-SUI Junior Friendly. She then competed at the Flanders International Team Challenge and finished fourth with the team. She ended her season at the Élite Gym Massilia with a bronze medal in the Open All-Around and a sixth-place finish on vault.

== Senior career ==
=== 2016 ===
At the National Championships, Devillard finished twelfth in the senior all-around and won the gold medal on vault. Devillard was ultimately not named to the French 2016 Olympic Team. Afterwards, Devillard competed at the French Review where she won a gold medal on vault, a silver medal on balance beam, and a bronze medal in the all-around. She ended her first senior season at the Élite Gym Massilia with a gold medal on vault and a twenty-third-place finish in the all-around.

=== 2017 ===
Devillard was selected to compete at the 2017 European Championships, and she became the first French gymnast to win the European title on vault. She then won the gold on vault at the Paris World Cup. At the World Championships, Devillard fell on one of her vaults in the qualification and did not make it into the event final.

=== 2018 ===
Devillard began her season with a bronze medal on vault at the Doha World Cup. At the National Championships, she placed sixth in the all-around and won silver on vault despite falling on both vaults. At the Sainté Gym Cup, Devillard won gold medals with the team and on vault, and she won a bronze medal on floor. Devillard was selected to compete with Juliette Bossu, Marine Boyer, Lorette Charpy, and Melanie de Jesus dos Santos at the 2018 European Championships, and the team won a silver medal. Individually, Devillard finished sixth on vault. Devillard could not go to the World Championships because of an ankle injury.

=== 2019 ===
Devillard started her season at the Baku World Cup where she finished fourth on vault. Devillard won a bronze medal on vault at the 2019 Doha World Cup in addition to finishing eighth on floor. At the 2019 European Championships, Devillard won a silver medal on vault behind Maria Paseka. After the competition, Devillard said "I dreamt of this medal, I knew I could do something. I succeeded on both of my vaults. One could always do better, but I’ve come back, and I’ve repeated a medal... Given that [Paseka's] start value was mega high, with two-tenths more than mine, she was automatically the favorite. And she did her job. But I am also going to augment my difficulty value next year, and we’ll see who will win."

On 3 September Devillard was named to the team to compete at the 2019 World Championships in Stuttgart, Germany alongside Lorette Charpy, Marine Boyer, Mélanie de Jesus dos Santos, and Aline Friess. She later had to withdraw due to an ankle injury.

=== 2020 ===
Devillard competed at the Melbourne World Cup in February where she won silver on vault, finishing behind Jade Carey. She later competed at the Baku World Cup; during qualifications she finished second on vault behind Teja Belak and therefore qualified to the event finals. However event finals were canceled due to the 2020 coronavirus outbreak in Azerbaijan.

=== 2022 ===
In October Devillard was named to the team to compete at the World Championships in Liverpool alongside Marine Boyer, Mélanie de Jesus dos Santos, Aline Friess, and Carolann Héduit. She competed in the vault final and won the bronze medal; this was the first individual medal for a French female gymnast at the World Championships since 2009.

=== 2023 ===
Devillard competed at the World Cups in Doha and Baku, winning gold on vault at both. She next competed at the European Championships where she won gold on vault, a feat she last achieved in 2017.

In August, Devillard was named to the team to compete at the World Championships alongside Marine Boyer, Mélanie de Jesus dos Santos, Lorette Charpy, and Morgane Osyssek. At the World Championships Devillard contributed a score on the vault towards France's surprise bronze medal win – France's first team medal since 1950. Individually, Devillard qualified to the vault final where she finished ninth.

=== 2024 ===
In May, Devillard competed at the European Championships alongside Ming van Eijken, Lorette Charpy, Marine Boyer, and Morgane Osyssek. During event finals Devillard won gold on vault for the third time in her career. During the team final, she helped France win the bronze medal behind Italy and Great Britain.

In July, Devillard was officially selected to represent France at the 2024 Summer Olympics alongside Mélanie de Jesus dos Santos, Boyer, Osyssek, and van Eijken. They finished eleventh in qualifications and did not advance to the team final.

== Competitive history ==
Year	Event	Team	AA	VT	UB	BB	FX
Junior
2012	Élite Gym Massilia	6	15				
2014	National Championships		8				
2014	International Tournoi Combs-la-Ville	3rd place, bronze medalist(s)	5	1st place, gold medalist(s)		1st place, gold medalist(s)	4
2015	National Championships		12	2nd place, silver medalist(s)			
2015	FRA-GBR-SUI Junior Friendly	1st place, gold medalist(s)					
2015	Flanders International Team Challenge	4					
2015	Élite Gym Massilia		3rd place, bronze medalist(s)	6			
Senior
2016	National Championships		12	1st place, gold medalist(s)			
2016	French Review		3rd place, bronze medalist(s)	1st place, gold medalist(s)		2nd place, silver medalist(s)	
2016	Élite Gym Massilia		23	1st place, gold medalist(s)			
2017
2017	European Championships			1st place, gold medalist(s)			
2017	Paris World Cup			1st place, gold medalist(s)			
2017	World Championships			15			
2018	Doha World Cup			3rd place, bronze medalist(s)			
2018	National Championships		6	2nd place, silver medalist(s)			
2018	Sainté Gym Cup	1st place, gold medalist(s)		1st place, gold medalist(s)			3rd place, bronze medalist(s)
2018	European Championships	2nd place, silver medalist(s)		6			
2019	Baku World Cup			4			
2019	Doha World Cup			3rd place, bronze medalist(s)			8
2019	European Championships			2nd place, silver medalist(s)			
2020	Melbourne World Cup			2nd place, silver medalist(s)			
2020	Baku World Cup			(Note: Devillard qualified to the vault final in second place; however event finals were canceled)			
2021	Varna Challenge Cup			1st place, gold medalist(s)			
2021	National Championships		12	1st place, gold medalist(s)		2nd place, silver medalist(s)	
2021	Doha World Cup			2nd place, silver medalist(s)			
2021	World Championships			R2			
2022	City of Jesolo Trophy	6		1st place, gold medalist(s)			
2022	Paris Challenge Cup			3rd place, bronze medalist(s)			
2022	World Championships	8		3rd place, bronze medalist(s)			
2023	Doha World Cup			1st place, gold medalist(s)		6	
2023	Baku World Cup			1st place, gold medalist(s)			
2023	European Championships	6		1st place, gold medalist(s)			
2023	World Championships	3rd place, bronze medalist(s)		9			
2024	Osijek Challenge Cup			1st place, gold medalist(s)		4	2nd place, silver medalist(s)
2024	European Championships	3rd place, bronze medalist(s)		1st place, gold medalist(s)			
2024	Olympic Games	11					
