= Boglárka Dévai =

Hungarian artistic gymnast

- Nickname: Bogi
- Born: 12 November 1999 (age 26) Szombathely, Hungary

Gymnastics career
- Discipline: Women's artistic gymnastics
- Country represented: Hungary; (2015 – 2020)
- Club: Delfin SI SE
- Head coaches: Erzsebet Vizer, Gabor Racz
- Retired: 2023
Medal record
Women's artistic gymnastics
Representing Hungary
European Championships
Gold medal – first place	2018 Glasgow	Vault
Bronze medal – third place	2017 Cluj-Napoca	Vault
FIG World Cup
Event / 1st / 2nd / 3rd; World Challenge Cup / 2 / 4 / 1

Boglárka Dévai (born 12 November 1999) is a Hungarian former artistic gymnast. She is the 2018 European vault champion and the 2017 European vault bronze medalist. She won two FIG World Challenge Cup gold medals.

== Gymnastics career ==
Dévai represented Hungary at the 2014 Summer Youth Olympics and advanced to the all-around final, finishing 16th. She also advanced into the vault final and finished sixth.

Dévai became age-eligible for senior international competitions in 2015. At the 2015 Osijek World Challenge Cup, she fell on a Yurchenko double twist vault in the qualifications but still advanced to the finals in eighth place. She landed both vaults in the final and won the silver medal– her first FIG World Cup medal.

Dévai had to withdraw from the 2016 European Championships due to an elbow injury. She won a bronze medal on the vault at the 2016 Szombathely World Challenge Cup.

At the 2017 European Championships, Dévai won a bronze medal on the vault, behind Coline Devillard and Ellie Downie. She then won a vault silver medal at the Koper World Challenge Cup and a gold medal at the Osijek World Challenge Cup. At the Szombathely World Challenge Cup, she won the vault silver medal behind Azerbaijan's Marina Nekrasova. She only competed on the vault at the 2017 World Championships but did not advance into the final.

Dévai helped Hungary advance into the team final at the 2018 European Championships, and they finished eighth. Then in the vault final, she won the gold medal and became Hungary's first European Women's Artistic Gymnastics Championships champion since Adrienn Varga also won vault in 1998.

In September 2018, Dévai broke her toe and had surgery. The surgical wound became infected, leading to multiple operations and steroid and antibiotic treatments. She was not able to resume training until June 2019. She rejoined the Hungarian national team training camps in March 2020. She made her return to competition in October at the 2020 Szombathely World Challenge Cup and won the vault gold medal. Two weeks later, she tore her ACL and underwent surgery. She announced her retirement in 2023.
