= Aline Friess =

French artistic gymnast

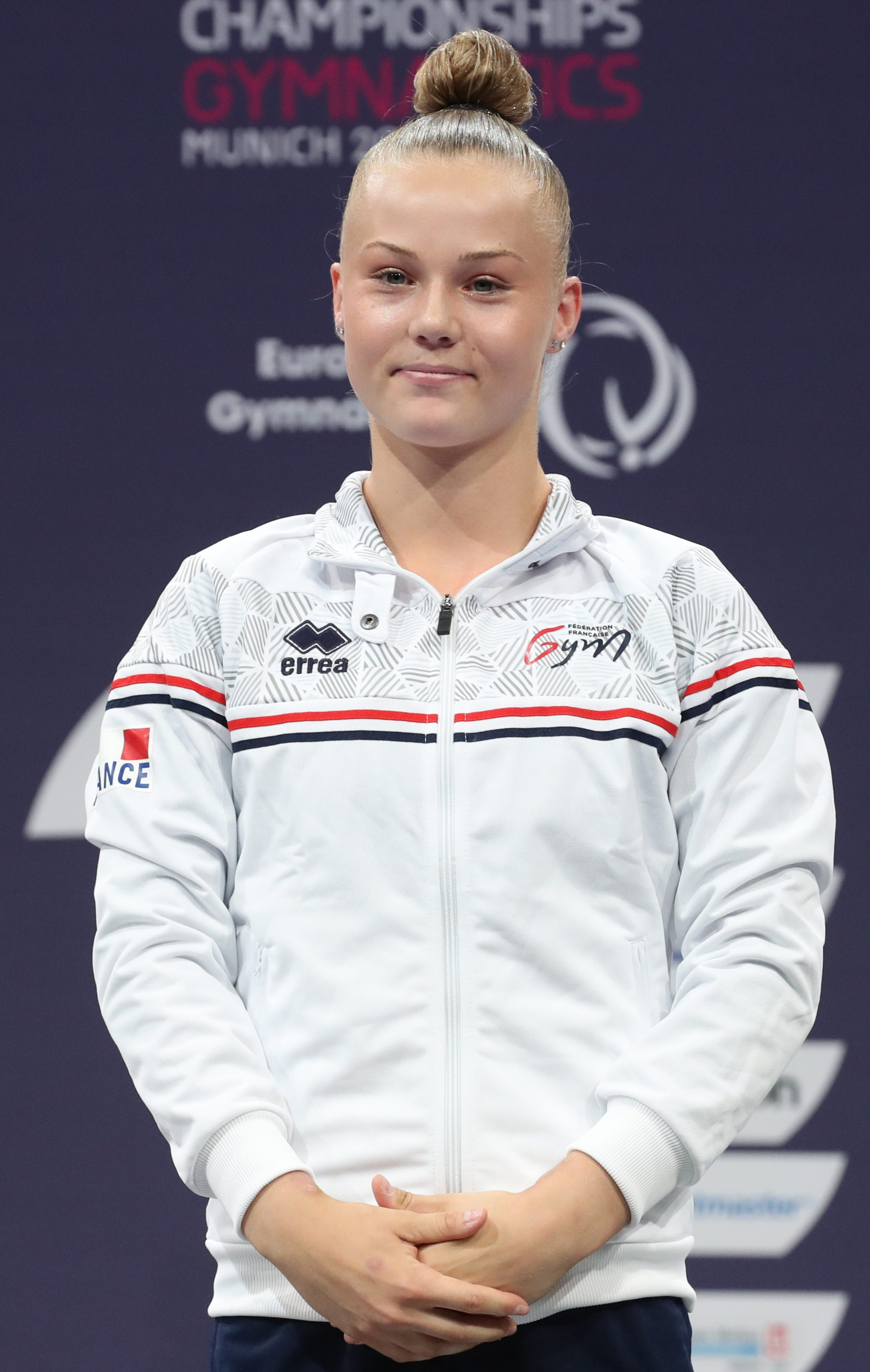
- Friess at the 2022 European Championships

Personal information
- Full name: Aline Friess
- Nickname: Frissou
- Born: July 5, 2003 (age 23) Obernai, France
- Height: 1.67 m (5 ft 6 in)

Gymnastics career
- Discipline: Women's artistic gymnastics
- Country represented: France; (2016–2025)
- Club: Meaux Gymnastique (2024–present); Sports Reunis Obernai (2009–2024)
- Gym: INSEP
- Head coaches: Tara Duncanson, Frédéric Jay
- Former coaches: Eric Hagard, Monique Hagard, Nellu Pop, Martine Georges, Alisée Dal Santos, Jérome Martin
- Choreographer: Grégory Milan
- Retired: January 27, 2026
Medal record
Women's artistic gymnastics
Representing France
European Championships
Bronze medal – third place	2022 Munich	Vault
Event / 1st / 2nd / 3rd; World Challenge Cup / 3 / 0 / 1

Aline Friess (born 5 July 2003) is a French former artistic gymnast. She competed with the French teams at the 2019 World Championships, the 2020 Summer Olympics, the 2022 World Artistic Gymnastics Championships and the 2022 European Women's Artistic Gymnastics Championships where she won bronze on vault.

== Early life ==
Friess was born on 5 July 2003 in Obernai. She began gymnastics in 2009 after she accompanied a friend to a training session. In 2016, she moved from her club in Obernai to a national training centre in Saint-Étienne (Pole France de Saint-Etienne) and joined the French national team. In 2023, she moved to INSEP in Paris because she needed some changes after a complicated year.

== Junior career ==
Friess made her international debut at the 2016 Élite Gym Massilia where she finished fourth with her team and twenty-fourth in the all-around.

=== 2017 ===
At the Sainté Gym Cup, Friess helped the French team win the gold medal, and she won the silver medal in the all-around. She then won the gold medal in the all-around at the International GymSport in Sangalhos, Portugal, and she won the bronze medal on the balance beam and the floor exercise. Then at the French Championships, she won the silver medal in the all-around behind Célia Serber. She also placed eighth on the uneven bars and seventh on the floor exercise. She helped the French team win the silver medal behind Italy at the FIT Challenge and placed eleventh in the all-around. She competed at the European Youth Olympic Festival but on vault, she was injured and had two fractures in her foot. She missed the rest of the season and did not return to training until March 2018.

=== 2018 ===
Friess returned to competition in May at the French Championships where she competed on the vault, uneven bars, and floor exercise but did not qualify for any finals. In July, she competed at the Pieve di Soligo Friendly in Italy and finished sixteenth in the all-around and helped the French team placed second behind Italy. She was chosen as the alternate for the European Championships. However, when Julia Forestier had to withdraw due to an injury, Friess was put on the team. She competed on the uneven bars with a score of 12.900 and balance beam with a score of 10.933, helping the team finish fifth. In November, she competed at Élite Gym Massilia where she won the team gold medal and finished twelfth in the all-around, fourth on vault, and she won a bronze medal on balance beam.

== Senior career ==
=== 2019 ===
Friess became age-eligible for senior competition in 2019. She made her senior debut at the EnBW DTB-Pokal Team Challenge in Stuttgart where France placed fourth in the team final. Then at the French Championships, she finished fourth in the all-around and on the floor exercise. She was selected to compete at the European Games alongside Lorette Charpy and Carolann Héduit. She finished fourth in the all-around final, just less than a tenth away from making the podium with a score of 52.699. She then competed at the Worms Friendly where the French team finished third behind Germany and Belgium, and she won the silver medal in the all-around behind Elisabeth Seitz. She was named to the World Championships team alongside Marine Boyer, Lorette Charpy, Melanie de Jesus dos Santos, and Claire Pontlevoy. The team finished fifth in the team final and qualified France for a team spot at the 2020 Olympic Games. Friess qualified for the all-around final where she finished eleventh with a score of 54.798.

=== 2020 ===
In late January, it was announced that Friess would compete at the Stuttgart World Cup taking place in March. The Stuttgart World Cup was later canceled due to the COVID-19 pandemic in Germany. She injured her knee in October and had surgery, causing her to miss the rest of the season.

=== 2021 ===
Friess returned to competition at the Ukraine International Cup and won gold medals in the all-around and on the floor exercise. She proceeded to compete at the FIT Challenge and helped the French team win the gold medal. Individually, Friess won the silver medal in the all-around behind Mélanie de Jesus dos Santos, and she placed fifth on the uneven bars and eighth on the balance beam. On 14 June, she was selected to represent France at the 2020 Summer Olympics alongside Mélanie de Jesus dos Santos, Marine Boyer, and Carolann Héduit. At the Olympics, she helped France qualify to the team final where they finished sixth.

=== 2022 ===
In May, Friess competed at the Varna World Challenge Cup in Bulgaria, where she qualified to all four event finals. During the finals, she won three gold medals on vault, uneven bars and floor exercise, and also picked up a bronze on balance beam.

In August Friess competed at the European Championships in Munich, where France finished sixth in the team final. Individually, she qualified to the vault final, where she won the bronze medal behind Zsófia Kovács and Asia D'Amato. In October Friess was named to the team to compete at the World Championships in Liverpool alongside Marine Boyer, Mélanie de Jesus dos Santos, Coline Devillard, and Carolann Héduit.

=== 2026 ===
Friess announced her retirement from gymnastics on January 27, 2026.

== Personal life ==
Friess speaks French and some English. Outside of gymnastics, she also plays ping-pong and badminton. She is currently studying at Emlyon Business School.

== Competitive history ==
Competitive history of Aline Friess at the junior level
Year	Event	Team	AA	VT	UB	BB	FX
2016	Élite Gym Massilia	4	24				
2017	Sainté Gym Cup	1st place, gold medalist(s)	2nd place, silver medalist(s)				
2017	International GymSport		1st place, gold medalist(s)			3rd place, bronze medalist(s)	3rd place, bronze medalist(s)
2017	French Championships		2nd place, silver medalist(s)		8		7
2017	FIT Challenge	2nd place, silver medalist(s)	11				
2017	European Youth Olympic Festival	6					
2018	Pieve di Soligo Friendly	2nd place, silver medalist(s)	16				
2018	European Championships	5					
2018	Élite Gym Massilia	1st place, gold medalist(s)	12	4		3rd place, bronze medalist(s)	

Competitive history of Aline Friess at the senior level
Year	Event	Team	AA	VT	UB	BB	FX
2019	DTB Team Challenge	4	9				
2019	French Championships		4				4
2019	European Games		4				
2019	Worms Friendly	3rd place, bronze medalist(s)	2nd place, silver medalist(s)				
2019	World Championships	5	11				
2021	Ukraine International Cup		1st place, gold medalist(s)		5		1st place, gold medalist(s)
2021	FIT Challenge	1st place, gold medalist(s)	2nd place, silver medalist(s)		5	8	
2021	Olympic Games	6					
2022	Varna Challenge Cup			1st place, gold medalist(s)	1st place, gold medalist(s)	3rd place, bronze medalist(s)	1st place, gold medalist(s)
2022	European Championships	6	14	3rd place, bronze medalist(s)			
2022	Paris Challenge Cup				6		
2022	World Championships	8	21	R2			
