= Carolann Héduit =

French artistic gymnast (born 2003)

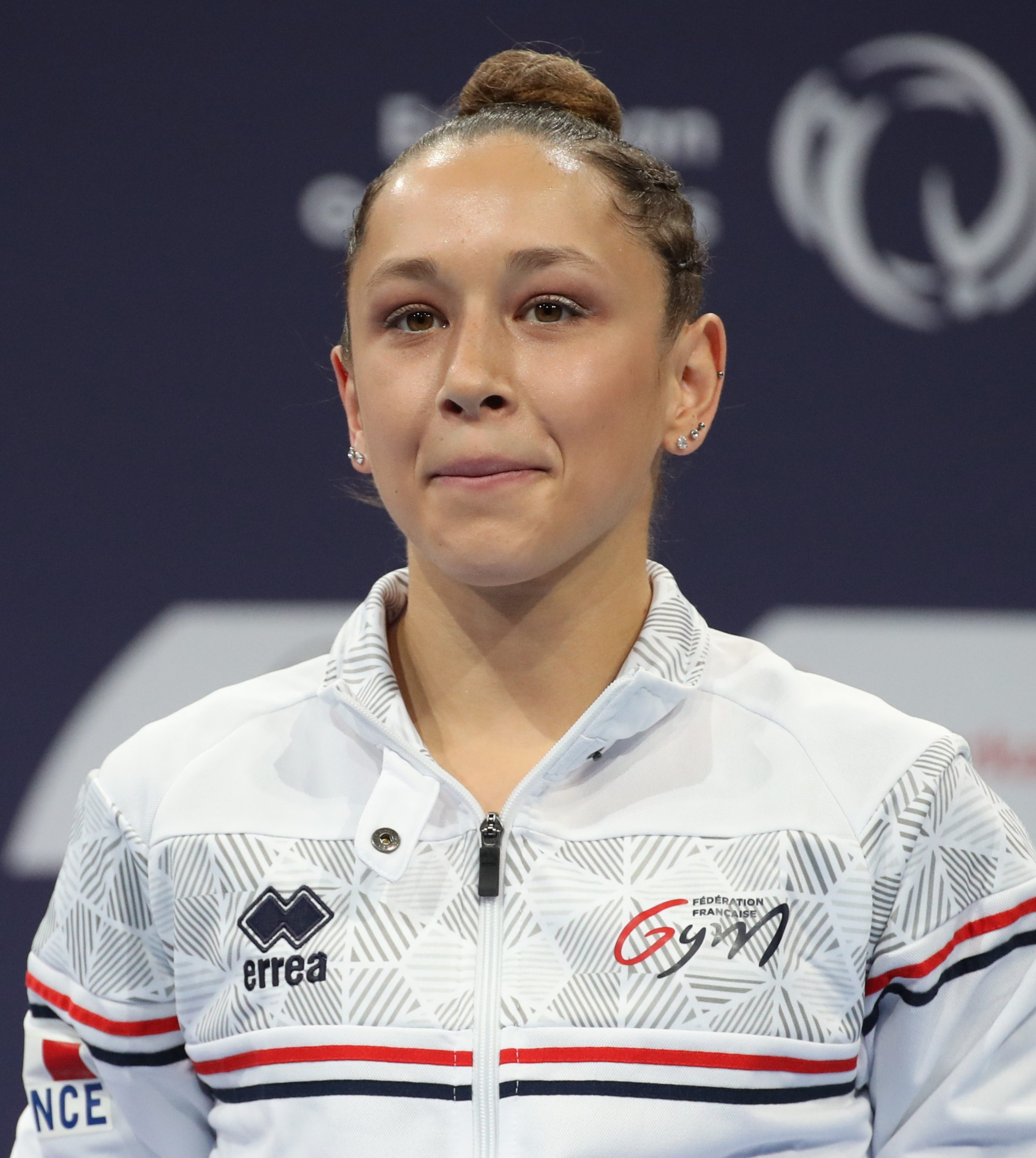
- Héduit at the 2022 European Championships

Personal information
- Born: 2 December 2003 (age 22) Angers, France
- Height: 1.45 m (4 ft 9 in)

Gymnastics career
- Discipline: Women's artistic gymnastics
- Country represented: France; (2016–2024)
- Club: Avoine Beaumont Gymnastique
- Gym: Avoine Beaumont Gymnastique
- Head coaches: Gina Chirilcenco, Marc Chirilcenco
- Retired: 2 June 2024
Medal record
Representing France
European Championships
Bronze medal – third place	2022 Munich	Balance beam
Mediterranean Games
Silver medal – second place	2022 Oran	Team
Bronze medal – third place	2022 Oran	All-around
Bronze medal – third place	2022 Oran	Balance beam

Carolann Héduit (born 2 December 2003) is a retired French artistic gymnast. She is the 2022 European Championships bronze medalist on the balance beam. She is the 2021 and 2022 French all-around champion and represented France at the 2020 Summer Olympics.

== Early life ==
Héduit was born in Angers, France on 2 December 2003. She started gymnastics at the age of six at Angers Gymnastique.

== Junior gymnastics career ==
Héduit was first added to the French national gymnastics team in 2016.

=== 2017 ===
Héduit made her international debut at the City of Jesolo Trophy, finishing fifth with the French junior team. Individually, she placed ninth in the all-around and fifth on the uneven bars. In May, she competed at the French Championships where she won the bronze medal in the all-around behind Célia Serber and Aline Friess. She also tied for the bronze medal with Juliette Bossu in the uneven bars final. Then at the FIT Challenge, she helped the French team win the silver medal behind Italy and finished fifth in the all-around. In July, she helped the French team win the silver medal at the German Junior Friendly, and she placed seventh in the all-around. Then in November, she competed at the Élite Gym Massilia in Marseille where she won the silver medal on the vault behind Aleksandra Shchekoldina of Russia. She also placed eighth in the all-around and sixth on the balance beam.

=== 2018 ===
In April, Héduit competed at the City of Jesolo Trophy where she won the bronze medal on the uneven bars behind Elisa Iorio of Italy and Ksenia Klimenko of Russia. She also placed third with the French team and eleventh in the all-around. Then at the French Championships, she placed second in the all-around behind Célia Serber and fourth on the uneven bars. She won the silver medal in the all-around behind Anastasiia Bachynska of Ukraine at the Youth Olympic Qualifier. Then at the Pieve di Soligo Friendly, she helped the French team win the silver medal behind Italy and won the bronze medal in the all-around behind Italians Elisa Iorio and Giorgia Villa. She was then selected to represent France at the European Championships in Glasgow and helped the French team finish fifth. She qualified for the uneven bars final where she won the bronze medal behind Russians Ksenia Klimenko and Irina Komnova. She qualified for the Youth Olympic Games in Buenos Aires, but she was injured before the start of the competition. She returned to competition in November at the Élite Gym Massilia where she won the gold medal on the uneven bars and the silver medal in the all-around.

== Senior gymnastics career ==
=== 2019 ===
Héduit became age-eligible for senior competition in 2019. In March, she competed at the Birmingham World Cup and finished fourth behind Aliya Mustafina of Russia, Riley McCusker of the United States, and Thaís Fidélis of Brazil. In June, she placed sixth at the French Championships and was selected to compete at the European Games in Minsk. She finished seventeenth all-around in qualifications, but did not make the final due to the two-per-country rule. She missed the second half of the 2019 season due to an ankle injury and had surgery in August.

=== 2020-21 ===
Héduit did not compete in any international competitions in 2020 due to the impacts of the COVID-19 pandemic. In December 2020, she competed at the Coupe d’Hiver and finished seventh in the all-around and won a silver medal in the team event.

In April, Héduit was selected to represent France at the 2021 European Championships alongside Mélanie de Jesus dos Santos, Marine Boyer and Sheyen Petit. She qualified for the all-around final where she placed twelfth. She was the second reserve for the floor final, but ended up competing after Larisa Iordache of Romania withdrew from the final due to health issues and Giulia Steingruber of Switzerland withdrew due to injury. However, Héduit sustained a knee injury during the final and could not finish her routine. The injury was not serious, and she returned to training a few days later.

In June, Héduit became the French all-around champion, and she also won the titles on balance beam and floor exercise, and she placed fourth on the uneven bars. Later that month, she was selected to represent France at the 2020 Summer Olympics alongside Marine Boyer, Mélanie de Jesus dos Santos and Aline Friess. At the Olympics, Héduit helped France qualify to the team final where they finished sixth. She also qualified for the all-around final with a total score of 53.565.

In September, Héduit was selected to compete at the 2021 World Championships alongside Coline Devillard and Célia Serber. She qualified for the all-around final and finished ninth with a total score of 51.965.

=== 2022 ===
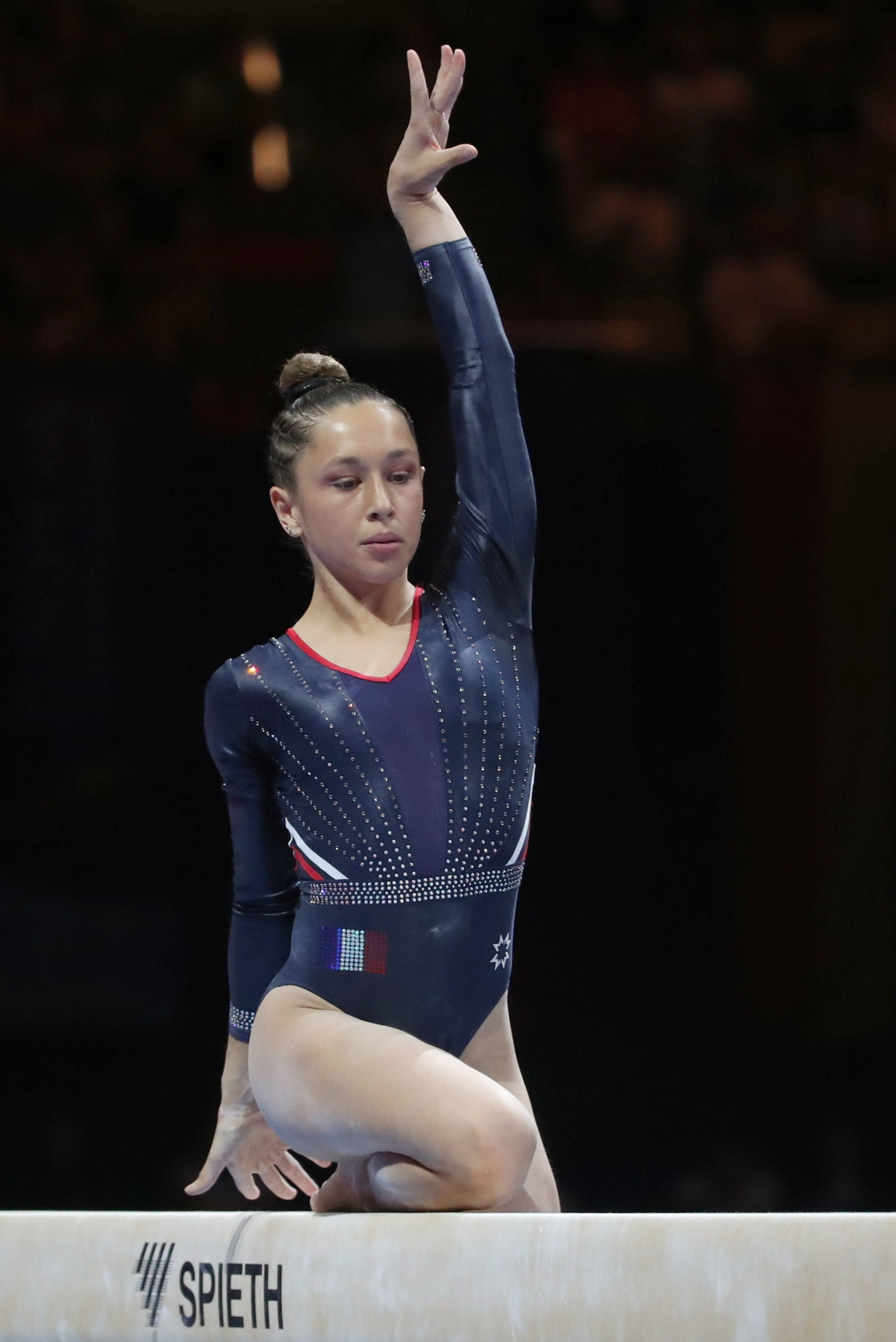
Héduit at the 2022 European Championships

In April, Héduit finished fourth on the balance beam at the Baku World Cup.

In June Héduit competed at the Mediterranean Games, where the French team took the silver medal behind Italy. Individually, Héduit won the bronze medals in the all-around and on the balance beam and finished sixth on the uneven bars. At the European Championships in Munich, France finished sixth in the team final. Additionally, Héduit placed fourth in the all-around, and won the bronze medal on the balance beam behind Emma Malewski and Ondine Achampong.

In October Héduit was named to the team to compete at the World Championships in Liverpool alongside Marine Boyer, Mélanie de Jesus dos Santos, Coline Devillard, and Aline Friess. They finished eighth as a team.

== Competitive history ==
Year	Event	Team	AA	VT	UB	BB	FX
Junior
2017	City of Jesolo Trophy	5	9		5		2nd place, silver medalist(s)
2017	French Championships		3rd place, bronze medalist(s)		3rd place, bronze medalist(s)		
2017	FIT Challenge	2nd place, silver medalist(s)	5	2nd place, silver medalist(s)			
2017	German Junior Friendly	2nd place, silver medalist(s)	7				
2017	Élite Gym Massilia		8	2nd place, silver medalist(s)	6		
2018	City of Jesolo Trophy	3rd place, bronze medalist(s)	11		3rd place, bronze medalist(s)		
2018	French Championships		2nd place, silver medalist(s)		4		
2018	Youth Olympic Games Qualifier		2nd place, silver medalist(s)				
2018	Pieve di Soligo Friendly	2nd place, silver medalist(s)	3rd place, bronze medalist(s)				
2018	European Championships	5			3rd place, bronze medalist(s)		
2018	Élite Gym Massilia		2nd place, silver medalist(s)		1st place, gold medalist(s)		
Senior
2019	Birmingham World Cup		4				
2019	French Championships		6				
2019	European Games		17				
2020	Coupe d’Hiver	2nd place, silver medalist(s)	7				
2021
2021	European Championships		12				8
2021	French Championships		1st place, gold medalist(s)		4	1st place, gold medalist(s)	1st place, gold medalist(s)
2021	Olympic Games	6	12				
2021	World Championships		9				
2022	Baku World Cup					4	
2022	Mediterranean Games	2nd place, silver medalist(s)	3rd place, bronze medalist(s)		6	3rd place, bronze medalist(s)	
2022	European Championships	6	4			3rd place, bronze medalist(s)	
2022	World Championships	8	19				
