= Anastasiya Alistratava =

Belarusian artistic gymnast

Anastasiya Alistratava Анастасия Алистратова
- Full name: Anastasiya Alistratava
- Nickname: Nastya
- Born: 16 October 2003 (age 23) Grodno, Belarus

Gymnastics career
- Discipline: Women's artistic gymnastics
- Country represented: Belarus; (2017–2021)
- Club: Specialised Children's-Youth School of Olympic Reserve No.3
- Head coach: Olga Knysh
Medal record
Women's artistic gymnastics
Representing Belarus
European Games
Bronze medal – third place	2019 Minsk	Uneven Bars

Anastasiya Alistratava (Belarusian: Анастасія Алістратава) (born 16 October 2003) is a Belarusian artistic gymnast. She is the 2019 European Games uneven bars bronze medalist.

== Early life ==
Alistratava was born in Grodno in 2003. Her parents started her in gymnastics when she was four years old.

== Gymnastics career ==
=== Junior: 2016–2018 ===
In 2016, Alistratava made her debut at the Antonina Koshel Cup where she placed fourth amongst the junior competitors; she recorded the second highest balance beam score. In 2017, she competed at the European Youth Olympic Festival alongside Dziyana Kirykovich and Aliaksandra Varabyova. As a team they finished in 17th place. Individually, Alistratava finished the all-around in 30th place and did not qualify for the final.

In 2018, Alistratava competed at the Dityatin Cup where she finished second in the all-around behind Nelli Audi of Russia. During event finals she won gold on uneven bars, silver on balance beam behind Audi, and bronze on floor exercise behind Audi and Darya Yassinskaya of Kazakhstan. She next competed at the Youth Olympic Qualifier where she placed twenty-fourth in the all-around; however Aliaksandra Varabyova would go on to represent Belarus at the 2018 Youth Olympics. Alistratava was later selected to represent Belarus at the 2018 European Championships alongside Varabyova, Ganna Metelitsa, Kseniya Pilets, and Anastasiya Savitskaya. Together they finished twelfth as a team. Individually Alistratava finished fifteenth in the all-around and qualified to the uneven bars final where she finished seventh. Alistratava finished the season competing at the Belarusian National Championships where she finished second behind Varabyova in the all-around, first on uneven bars, second on balance beam behind Savitskaya, and fourth on floor exercise.

=== Senior: 2019–2021 ===
Alistratava became age-eligible for senior level competition in 2019. She competed at the 2019 European Championships where she placed fourth on uneven bars behind Russians Anastasia Ilyankova and Angelina Melnikova and Alice D'Amato of Italy. She next competed at the European Games Test Event where she placed fifth in the all-around, first on uneven bars, and second on floor exercise behind Yelizaveta Hubareva of Ukraine. At the 2019 European Games she qualified to the all-around, uneven bars, and floor exercise finals and was the third reserve for the balance beam final. During the all-around final she placed twelfth. She won bronze on the uneven bars behind Melnikova and Becky Downie of Great Britain. On floor exercise she finished fourth. Alistratava next competed at the Paris Challenge Cup where she placed fourth on uneven bars and sixth on floor exercise. Alistratava ended the season competing at the 2019 World Championships in Stuttgart. During qualifications she finished 57th in the all-around and 25th on uneven bars. Although she did not qualify for any event finals, she qualified as an individual to the 2020 Olympic Games in Tokyo.

The 2020 Summer Olympics were postponed to 2021 due to the global COVID-19 pandemic. Alistratava was injured weeks before the start of the Olympic Games and had to withdraw from the competition.

== Competitive history ==
Competitive history of Anastasiya Alistratava
Year	Event	Team	AA	VT	UB	BB	FX
2016	Antonina Koshel Cup		4				
2017	European Youth Olympic Festival	17					
2018	Dityatin Cup		2nd place, silver medalist(s)		1st place, gold medalist(s)	2nd place, silver medalist(s)	3rd place, bronze medalist(s)
2018	Youth Olympic Qualifier		24				
2018	Junior European Championships	17	15		7		
2018	Belarus Championships		2nd place, silver medalist(s)		1st place, gold medalist(s)	2nd place, silver medalist(s)	4
2019
2019	European Championships				4		
2019	European Games Test Event		5		1st place, gold medalist(s)		2nd place, silver medalist(s)
2019	European Games		12		3rd place, bronze medalist(s)	R3	4
2019	Paris Challenge Cup				4		6
