= 2018 European Women's Artistic Gymnastics Championships =

32nd European Women's Artistic Gymnastics Championships
- Venue: The SSE Hydro
- Location: Glasgow, Scotland, United Kingdom
- Start date: 2 August 2018
- End date: 5 August 2018

The 32nd European Women's Artistic Gymnastics Championships were held from 2 to 5 August 2018 at the SSE Hydro in Glasgow, Scotland, United Kingdom.

== Competition schedule ==
Date	Sessions	Time	Subdivisions
Thursday, 2 August	Opening ceremony		
Thursday, 2 August	Senior Women's Qualification for Team Final & Individual Apparatus Finals	10:00 AM – 12:15 PM	Subdivision 1
Thursday, 2 August	Senior Women's Qualification for Team Final & Individual Apparatus Finals	01:00 PM – 03:15 PM	Subdivision 2
Thursday, 2 August	Senior Women's Qualification for Team Final & Individual Apparatus Finals	04:00 PM – 06:15 PM	Subdivision 3
Thursday, 2 August	Senior Women's Qualification for Team Final & Individual Apparatus Finals	07:00 PM – 08:50 PM	Subdivision 4
Friday, 3 August	Juniors Women's Qualification for Individual Apparatus Finals and Junior Women's Team Final & All-Around Final	10:00 AM – 12:45 PM	Subdivision 1
Friday, 3 August	Juniors Women's Qualification for Individual Apparatus Finals and Junior Women's Team Final & All-Around Final	01:15 PM – 04:00 PM	Subdivision 2
Friday, 3 August	Juniors Women's Qualification for Individual Apparatus Finals and Junior Women's Team Final & All-Around Final	06:30 PM – 07:15 PM	Subdivision 3
Friday, 3 August	Juniors Women's Qualification for Individual Apparatus Finals and Junior Women's Team Final & All-Around Final	07:30 PM – 09:45 PM	Subdivision 4
Saturday, 4 August	Senior Women's Team Final	01:00 PM – 02:45 PM	-
Sunday, 5 August	Junior Women's Individual Apparatus Finals	10:00 AM – 12:55 PM	-
Sunday, 5 August	Senior Women's Individual Apparatus Finals	02:30 PM – 05:30 PM	-
Sunday, 5 August	Closing ceremony		

== Medal summary ==
=== Medalists ===
Event	Gold	Silver	Bronze
Senior
Team	Russia; Lilia Akhaimova; Irina Alexeeva; Angelina Melnikova; Ulyana Perebinosova; Angelina Simakova	France; Juliette Bossu; Marine Boyer; Lorette Charpy; Mélanie de Jesus dos Santos; Coline Devillard	Netherlands; Céline van Gerner; Vera van Pol; Naomi Visser; Tisha Volleman; Sanne Wevers
Vault	(Hungary) Boglárka Dévai	(Russia) Angelina Melnikova	(Romania) Denisa Golgotă
Uneven bars	(Belgium) Nina Derwael	(Sweden) Jonna Adlerteg	(Russia) Angelina Melnikova
Balance beam	(Netherlands) Sanne Wevers	(Belgium) Nina Derwael	(France) Marine Boyer
Floor exercise	(France) Mélanie de Jesus dos Santos	(Romania) Denisa Golgotă	(Belgium) Axelle Klinckaert
Junior
Team	Italy; Alice D’Amato; Asia D'Amato; Alessia Federici; Elisa Iorio; Giorgia Villa	Russia; Olga Astafyeva; Ksenia Klimenko; Irina Komnova; Vladislava Urazova; Yana Vorona	(United Kingdom) Great Britain; Ondine Achampong; Halle Hilton; Phoebe Jakubczyk; Amelie Morgan; Annie Young
All-around	(Italy) Giorgia Villa	(United Kingdom) Amelie Morgan	(Russia) Ksenia Klimenko
Vault	(Italy) Asia D'Amato	(Italy) Giorgia Villa	(United Kingdom) Amelie Morgan
Uneven bars	(Russia) Ksenia Klimenko	(Russia) Irina Komnova	(France) Carolann Héduit
Balance beam	(Italy) Giorgia Villa	(United Kingdom) Amelie Morgan	(Italy) Elisa Iorio
Floor exercise	(Romania) Ioana Stănciulescu	(Italy) Giorgia Villa	(United Kingdom) Amelie Morgan

=== Medal table ===
==== Combined ====
Rank	Nation	Gold	Silver	Bronze	Total
1	Italy (ITA)	4	2	1	7
2	Russia (RUS)	2	3	2	7
3	France (FRA)	1	1	2	4
4	Belgium (BEL)	1	1	1	3
4	Romania (ROU)	1	1	1	3
6	Netherlands (NED)	1	0	1	2
7	Hungary (HUN)	1	0	0	1
8	Great Britain (GBR)	0	2	3	5
9	Sweden (SWE)	0	1	0	1
Totals (9 entries)		11	11	11	33

==== Seniors ====
Rank	Nation	Gold	Silver	Bronze	Total
1	Belgium (BEL)	1	1	1	3
1	France (FRA)	1	1	1	3
1	Russia (RUS)	1	1	1	3
4	Netherlands (NED)	1	0	1	2
5	Hungary (HUN)	1	0	0	1
6	Romania (ROU)	0	1	1	2
7	Sweden (SWE)	0	1	0	1
Totals (7 entries)		5	5	5	15

==== Juniors ====
Rank	Nation	Gold	Silver	Bronze	Total
1	Italy (ITA)	4	2	1	7
2	Russia (RUS)	1	2	1	4
3	Romania (ROU)	1	0	0	1
4	Great Britain (GBR)	0	2	3	5
5	France (FRA)	0	0	1	1
Totals (5 entries)		6	6	6	18

== Senior ==
=== Team competition ===
Belgium withdrew before the competition to preserve their gymnasts' health for individual event finals. They were replaced by first reserve Italy.

Oldest and youngest competitors

	Name	Country	Date of birth	Age
Youngest	Taeja James	Great Britain	15 October 2002	15 years, 9 months and 20 days
Oldest	Angelina Radivilova	Ukraine	15 February 1991	27 years, 5 months and 20 days

Rank	Team	Vault (gymnastics)	Uneven bars	Balance beam	Floor (gymnastics)	Total
1st place, gold medalist(s)	Russia	43.098 (1)	42.299 (1)	39.932 (1)	39.866 (1)	165.195
1st place, gold medalist(s)	Angelina Melnikova	14.366	14.033	13.333	13.533	165.195
1st place, gold medalist(s)	Angelina Simakova	14.266		13.366	13.333	165.195
1st place, gold medalist(s)	Lilia Akhaimova	14.466			13.000	165.195
1st place, gold medalist(s)	Irina Alexeeva		14.233	13.233		165.195
1st place, gold medalist(s)	Ulyana Perebinosova		14.033			165.195
2nd place, silver medalist(s)	France	42.600 (3)	41.133 (2)	38.699 (2)	38.699 (4)	161.131
2nd place, silver medalist(s)	Mélanie de Jesus dos Santos	14.300	14.400	13.600	13.966	161.131
2nd place, silver medalist(s)	Marine Boyer	13.600		12.166	12.933	161.131
2nd place, silver medalist(s)	Lorette Charpy		12.533	12.933	11.800	161.131
2nd place, silver medalist(s)	Coline Devillard	14.700				161.131
2nd place, silver medalist(s)	Juliette Bossu		14.200			161.131
3rd place, bronze medalist(s)	Netherlands	42.098 (4)	40.399 (4)	37.866 (5)	39.200 (3)	159.563
3rd place, bronze medalist(s)	Vera van Pol	14.066	12.933	11.366	12.900	159.563
3rd place, bronze medalist(s)	Céline van Gerner		13.733	12.800	13.100	159.563
3rd place, bronze medalist(s)	Tisha Volleman	14.266			13.200	159.563
3rd place, bronze medalist(s)	Sanne Wevers		13.733	13.700		159.563
3rd place, bronze medalist(s)	Naomi Visser	13.766				159.563
4	Great Britain	42.932 (2)	41.032 (3)	33.766 (8)	39.533 (2)	157.263
4	Alice Kinsella	14.333		12.566	12.833	157.263
4	Georgia-Mae Fenton		14.100	11.500	13.200	157.263
4	Kelly Simm	14.033	13.866	9.700		157.263
4	Lucy Stanhope	14.566	13.066			157.263
4	Taeja James				13.500	157.263
5	Ukraine	41.333 (5)	36.265 (6)	37.966 (4)	36.565 (8)	152.129
5	Diana Varinska	13.933	11.933	13.166	12.466	152.129
5	Valeriya Osipova	14.000	11.766	12.200	12.333	152.129
5	Angelina Radivilova	13.400		12.600	11.766	152.129
5	Yana Fedorova		12.566			152.129
5	Alona Titarenko					152.129
6	Italy	40.133 (8)	34.632 (8)	38.132 (3)	38.599 (5)	151.496
6	Martina Basile	13.500		12.566	13.166	151.496
6	Giada Grisetti	13.333	12.266	12.866		151.496
6	Francesca Linari		12.200	12.700	12.933	151.496
6	Caterina Cereghetti	13.300	10.166		12.500	151.496
6	Sofia Busato					151.496
7	Spain	40.333 (7)	38.232 (5)	34.432 (7)	37.066 (6)	150.063
7	Ana Pérez	13.700	13.300	10.666	12.233	150.063
7	Helena Bonilla	13.433	12.266	10.733		150.063
7	Paula Raya	13.200	12.666			150.063
7	Cintia Rodríguez			13.033	12.600	150.063
7	Andrea Carmona				12.233	150.063
8	Hungary	40.565 (6)	35.332 (7)	37.066 (6)	36.766 (7)	149.729
8	Dorina Böczögő	12.733	10.400	13.100	12.700	149.729
8	Nóra Fehér		12.966	12.166	12.000	149.729
8	Sára Péter	13.566			12.066	149.729
8	Noémi Makra		11.966	11.800		149.729
8	Boglárka Dévai	14.266				149.729

=== Vault ===
Oldest and youngest competitors

	Name	Country	Date of birth	Age
Youngest	Denisa Golgotă	Romania	8 March 2002	16 years, 4 months and 28 days
Oldest	Teja Belak	Slovenia	22 April 1994	24 years, 3 months and 14 days

Position	Gymnast	D Score	E Score	Pen.	Score 1	D Score	E Score	Pen.	Score 2	Total
Position	Gymnast	Vault 1				Vault 2				Total
1st place, gold medalist(s)	(Hungary) Boglárka Dévai	6.000	8.733	0.100	14.633	5.400	8.966	0.300	14.066	14.349
2nd place, silver medalist(s)	(Russia) Angelina Melnikova	5.400	9.166		14.566	5.200	8.800	0.100	13.900	14.233
3rd place, bronze medalist(s)	(Romania) Denisa Golgotă	5.400	9.100		14.500	4.800	9.033		13.833	14.166
4	(Germany) Sarah Voss	5.400	9.033		14.433	4.800	8.933		13.733	14.083
5	(Russia) Lilia Akhaimova	5.800	8.566		14.366	4.800	8.966		13.766	14.066
6	(France) Coline Devillard	5.800	8.966		14.766	5.400	7.700		13.100	13.933
7	(Netherlands) Tisha Volleman	5.400	8.533		13.933	4.800	8.866		13.666	13.799
8	(Slovenia) Teja Belak	5.400	7.666		13.066	5.000	9.000		14.000	13.533

=== Uneven bars ===
Oldest and youngest competitors

	Name	Country	Date of birth	Age
Youngest	Lorette Charpy	France	3 December 2001	16 years, 8 months and 2 days
Oldest	Kim Bùi	Germany	20 January 1989	29 years, 6 months and 16 days

Position	Gymnast	D Score	E Score	Penalty	Total
1st place, gold medalist(s)	(Belgium) Nina Derwael	6.300	8.433		14.733
2nd place, silver medalist(s)	(Sweden) Jonna Adlerteg	6.200	8.333		14.533
3rd place, bronze medalist(s)	(Russia) Angelina Melnikova	6.100	8.266		14.366
4	(Germany) Kim Bùi	6.000	8.200		14.200
5	(Russia) Ulyana Perebinosova	6.100	8.066		14.166
6	(France) Lorette Charpy	5.800	8.333		14.133
7	(France) Juliette Bossu	5.900	8.200		14.100
8	(United Kingdom) Kelly Simm	6.000	8.066		14.066

=== Balance beam ===
Oldest and youngest competitors

	Name	Country	Date of birth	Age
Youngest	Maellyse Brassart	Belgium	22 June 2001	17 years, 1 month and 14 days
Oldest	Vasiliki Millousi	Greece	4 May 1984	34 years, 3 months and 1 day

Position	Gymnast	D Score	E Score	Penalty	Total
1st place, gold medalist(s)	(Netherlands) Sanne Wevers	5.600	8.300		13.900
2nd place, silver medalist(s)	(Belgium) Nina Derwael	5.000	8.600		13.600
3rd place, bronze medalist(s)	(France) Marine Boyer	5.800	7.366		13.166
4	(France) Mélanie de Jesus dos Santos	5.400	7.666		13.066
5	(Switzerland) Ilaria Käslin	5.100	7.466	0.100	12.466
6	(Germany) Pauline Schäfer	5.200	7.200		12.400
7	(Belgium) Maellyse Brassart	5.100	7.266	0.100	12.266
8	(Greece) Vasiliki Millousi	5.300	6.833		12.133

=== Floor ===
Oldest and youngest competitor

	Name	Country	Date of birth	Age
Youngest	Martina Basile	Italy	10 October 2002	15 years, 9 months and 26 days
Oldest	Céline van Gerner	Netherlands	1 December 1994	23 years, 8 months and 4 days

Position	Gymnast	D Score	E Score	Penalty	Total
1st place, gold medalist(s)	(France) Mélanie de Jesus dos Santos	5.500	8.266		13.766
2nd place, silver medalist(s)	(Romania) Denisa Golgotă	5.500	8.100		13.600
3rd place, bronze medalist(s)	(Belgium) Axelle Klinckaert	5.300	8.100		13.400
4	(Netherlands) Céline van Gerner	4.600	8.700		13.300
5	(Italy) Martina Basile	5.200	7.966		13.166
6	(Russia) Angelina Melnikova	5.400	7.866	0.100	13.166
7	(Sweden) Jessica Castles	4.700	8.100		12.800
8	(United Kingdom) Georgia-Mae Fenton	4.500	8.133		12.633

== Junior ==
=== Team competition ===
Oldest and youngest competitors

	Name	Country	Date of birth	Age
Youngest	Yana Vorona	Russia	28 December 2004	13 years, 7 months and 8 days
Oldest	Asia & Alice D'Amato	Italy	7 February 2003	15 years, 5 months and 29 days

Rank	Team	Vault (gymnastics)	Uneven bars	Balance beam	Floor (gymnastics)	Total
1st place, gold medalist(s)	Italy	43.232 (1)	41.299 (1)	38.666 (2)	37.866 (6)	161.063
1st place, gold medalist(s)	Alice D'Amato	13.500	12.866		12.200	161.063
1st place, gold medalist(s)	Asia D'Amato	14.400	13.433	12.333	12.466	161.063
1st place, gold medalist(s)	Alessia Federici			12.300		161.063
1st place, gold medalist(s)	Elisa Iorio	14.166	13.900	13.100	11.133	161.063
1st place, gold medalist(s)	Giorgia Villa	14.666	13.966	13.233	13.200	161.063
2nd place, silver medalist(s)	Russia	41.232 (2)	41.099 (2)	38.566 (3)	39.466 (2)	160.363
2nd place, silver medalist(s)	Olga Astafyeva	13.533	12.600	12.900	13.166	160.363
2nd place, silver medalist(s)	Ksenia Klimenko	13.366	14.333	13.033	12.800	160.363
2nd place, silver medalist(s)	Irina Komnova		14.166	12.066		160.363
2nd place, silver medalist(s)	Vladislava Urazova	13.933	10.100	12.633	13.500	160.363
2nd place, silver medalist(s)	Yana Vorona	13.766			12.633	160.363
3rd place, bronze medalist(s)	Great Britain	41.166 (3)	39.633 (4)	39.333 (1)	38.799 (3)	158.931
3rd place, bronze medalist(s)	Ondine Achampong	13.500	13.100	11.866	12.766	158.931
3rd place, bronze medalist(s)	Halle Hilton			13.133		158.931
3rd place, bronze medalist(s)	Phoebe Jakubczyk	13.700	12.966	12.700	13.000	158.931
3rd place, bronze medalist(s)	Amelie Morgan	13.966	13.333	13.500	13.033	158.931
3rd place, bronze medalist(s)	Annie Young	10.933	13.200		12.533	158.931
4	Romania	41.065 (5)	36.233 (11)	37.865 (5)	39.699 (1)	154.862
4	Antonia Duta	13.300	10.833	11.733	13.266	154.862
4	Ana-Maria Puiu		12.500			154.862
4	Silviana Sfiringu	14.066	11.033	12.966	13.200	154.862
4	Ioana Stănciulescu	13.466	12.700	12.333	13.233	154.862
4	Daniela Trica	13.533		12.566	12.400	154.862
5	France	40.866 (6)	40.499 (3)	34.699 (11)	38.665 (4)	154.729
5	Aline Friess		12.900	10.933		154.729
5	Carolann Héduit		14.033	10.700		154.729
5	Alizee Letrange	13.533		12.866	12.766	154.729
5	Claire Pontlevoy	13.700	13.366	10.900	13.033	154.729
5	Mathilde Wahl	13.633	13.100		12.866	154.729
6	Belgium	38.833 (13)	38.732 (7)	38.433 (4)	38.233 (5)	154.231
6	Stacy Bertrandt	12.700	12.966	10.366	12.133	154.231
6	Margaux Daveloose	12.700	12.800	12.700	12.800	154.231
6	Fien Enghels		12.400	13.000		154.231
6	Noemie Louon	12.733	12.966	12.733	12.500	154.231
6	Jade Vansteenkiste	13.400			12.933	154.231
7	Germany	41.066 (4)	37.299 (9)	37.366 (6)	37.166 (9)	152.897
7	Lara Hinsberger	13.566	13.033	11.966	12.300	152.897
7	Emma Malewski		11.966	11.700	12.533	152.897
7	Leonie Papke	12.933	12.233			152.897
7	Emelie Petz	13.900	12.033	12.700	12.333	152.897
7	Lisa Zimmermann	13.600		12.700	12.133	152.897
8	Ukraine	40.732 (7)	37.766 (8)	36.998 (7)	36.300 (11)	151.796
8	Anastasia Bachynska	14.066	12.600	12.366	12.100	151.796
8	Anhelina Deineka	11.866	12.533	11.000	12.200	151.796
8	Kateryna Kulinii		12.600			151.796
8	Tetiana Mokliak	13.533		11.466	12.000	151.796
8	Daria Murzhak	13.133	12.566	13.166	11.033	151.796

=== Individual all-around ===
Oldest and youngest competitors

	Name	Country	Date of birth	Age
Youngest	Lara Hinsberger	Germany	21 October 2004	13 years, 9 months and 15 days
Oldest	Asia D'Amato	Italy	7 February 2003	15 years, 5 months and 29 days

Position	Gymnast	Vault (gymnastics)	Uneven bars	Balance beam	Floor (gymnastics)	Total
1st place, gold medalist(s)	(Italy) Giorgia Villa	14.666	13.966	13.233	13.200	55.065
2nd place, silver medalist(s)	(United Kingdom) Amelie Morgan	13.966	13.333	13.500	13.033	53.832
3rd place, bronze medalist(s)	(Russia) Ksenia Klimenko	13.366	14.333	13.033	12.800	53.532
4	(Italy) Asia D'Amato	14.400	13.433	12.333	12.466	52.632
5	(United Kingdom) Phoebe Jakubczyk	13.700	12.966	12.700	13.000	52.366
–	(Italy) Elisa Iorio	14.166	13.900	13.100	11.133	52.299
6	(Russia) Olga Astafyeva	13.533	12.600	12.900	13.166	52.199
7	(Romania) Ioana Stănciulescu	13.466	12.700	12.333	13.233	51.732
8	(Romania) Silviana Sfiringu	14.066	11.033	12.966	13.200	51.265
–	(United Kingdom) Ondine Achampong	13.500	13.100	11.866	12.766	51.232
9	(Ukraine) Anastasia Bachynska	14.066	12.600	12.366	12.100	51.132
10	(Belgium) Margaux Daveloose	12.700	12.800	12.700	12.800	51.000
11	(France) Claire Pontlevoy	13.700	13.366	10.900	13.033	50.999
12	(Germany) Emelie Petz	13.900	12.033	12.700	12.333	50.966
13	(Belgium) Noemie Louon	12.733	12.966	12.733	12.500	50.932
14	(Germany) Lara Hinsberger	13.566	13.033	11.966	12.300	50.865
15	(Belarus) Anastasiya Alistratava	12.833	13.500	12.300	11.900	50.533
16	(Hungary) Bianka Schermann	13.333	13.000	11.433	12.633	50.399
17	(Spain) Lorena Medina	13.333	12.166	12.466	12.366	50.331
–	(Russia) Vladislava Urazova	13.933	10.100	12.633	13.500	50.166
18	(Hungary) Zója Székely	13.366	13.700	10.733	12.200	49.999
19	(Turkey) Nazli Savranbasi	13.000	12.566	12.133	12.266	49.965
20	(Ukraine) Daria Murzhak	13.133	12.566	13.166	11.033	49.898
–	(Hungary) Csenge Bácskay	13.666	12.533	11.466	11.966	49.631
21	(Netherlands) Sara van Disseldorp	13.200	12.666	10.466	13.000	49.332
–	(Romania) Antonia Duta	13.300	10.833	11.733	13.266	49.132
22	(Belarus) Anastasiya Savitskaya	12.866	11.366	12.400	11.900	48.532
23	(Spain) Claudia Villalba	13.366	10.700	12.133	12.266	48.465
–	(Spain) Alba Asencio	12.933	11.666	11.066	12.800	48.465
24	(Switzerland) Nina Ferrazzini	13.066	11.866	11.300	12.100	48.332

=== Vault ===
Oldest and youngest competitors

	Name	Country	Date of birth	Age
Youngest	Silviana Sfiringu	Romania	1 September 2004	13 years, 11 months and 4 days
Oldest	Asia D'Amato	Italy	7 February 2003	15 years, 5 months and 29 days

Position	Gymnast	D Score	E Score	Pen.	Score 1	D Score	E Score	Pen.	Score 2	Total
Position	Gymnast	Vault 1				Vault 2				Total
1st place, gold medalist(s)	(Italy) Asia D'Amato	5.400	8.866		14.266	5.200	9.000		14.200	14.233
2nd place, silver medalist(s)	(Italy) Giorgia Villa	5.400	9.133		14.533	4.600	9.300		13.900	14.216
3rd place, bronze medalist(s)	(United Kingdom) Amelie Morgan	5.400	8.866	0.100	14.166	4.600	9.166		13.766	13.966
4	(Ukraine) Anastasiia Bachynska	5.000	9.000		14.000	4.600	9.233		13.833	13.916
5	(Romania) Silviana Sfiringu	5.400	8.633	0.100	13.933	5.000	8.766		13.766	13.849
6	(Hungary) Csenge Bácskay	4.600	9.066		13.666	5.000	9.066	0.100	13.966	13.816
7	(Russia) Vladislava Urazova	5.000	8.800	0.100	13.700	4.600	9.000		13.600	13.650
8	(Russia) Olga Astafyeva	4.600	8.800		13.400	5.000	8.600	0.100	13.500	13.450

=== Uneven bars ===
Oldest and youngest competitors

	Name	Country	Date of birth	Age
Youngest	Irina Komnova	Russia	15 September 2004	13 years, 10 months and 21 days
Oldest	Giorgia Villa	Italy	23 February 2003	15 years, 5 months and 13 days

Position	Gymnast	D Score	E Score	Penalty	Total
1st place, gold medalist(s)	(Russia) Ksenia Klimenko	5.900	8.433		14.333
2nd place, silver medalist(s)	(Russia) Irina Komnova	5.900	8.366		14.266
3rd place, bronze medalist(s)	(France) Carolann Héduit	6.200	7.933		14.133
4	(Italy) Elisa Iorio	5.900	8.000		13.900
5	(Italy) Giorgia Villa	6.000	7.700		13.700
6	(Hungary) Zója Székely	5.600	8.066		13.666
7	(Belarus) Anastasiya Alistratava	5.400	7.200		12.600
8	(Netherlands) Astrid de Zeeuw	3.900	6.000		9.900

=== Balance beam ===
Oldest and youngest competitors

	Name	Country	Date of birth	Age
Youngest	Silviana Sfiringu	Romania	1 September 2004	13 years, 11 months and 4 days
Oldest	Giorgia Villa	Italy	23 February 2003	15 years, 5 months and 13 days

Position	Gymnast	D Score	E Score	Penalty	Total
1st place, gold medalist(s)	(Italy) Giorgia Villa	5.300	8.333		13.633
2nd place, silver medalist(s)	(United Kingdom) Amelie Morgan	5.300	8.166		13.466
3rd place, bronze medalist(s)	(Italy) Elisa Iorio	5.100	8.033		13.133
4	(Russia) Ksenia Klimenko	5.400	7.500		12.900
5	(Belgium) Fien Enghels	4.700	8.166		12.866
6	(Romania) Silviana Sfiringu	5.000	7.700		12.700
6	(Ukraine) Daria Murzhak	5.000	7.700		12.700
8	(United Kingdom) Halle Hilton	4.700	7.600		12.300

=== Floor ===
Oldest and youngest competitors

	Name	Country	Date of birth	Age
Youngest	Antonia Duta	Romania	8 October 2004	13 years, 9 months and 28 days
Oldest	Giorgia Villa	Italy	23 February 2003	15 years, 5 months and 13 days

Position	Gymnast	D Score	E Score	Penalty	Total
1st place, gold medalist(s)	(Romania) Ioana Stănciulescu	5.400	8.033		13.433
2nd place, silver medalist(s)	(Italy) Giorgia Villa	5.200	8.133		13.333
3rd place, bronze medalist(s)	(United Kingdom) Amelie Morgan	4.900	8.100	0.100	12.900
4	(Romania) Antonia Duta	4.900	8.000		12.900
5	(Russia) Vladislava Urazova	5.100	7.900	0.100	12.900
6	(Russia) Olga Astafyeva	4.800	7.900		12.700
7	(Netherlands) Sara van Disseldorp	4.600	8.166	0.100	12.666
8	(France) Claire Pontlevoy	4.900	7.766		12.666

== Qualification ==
=== Senior ===
==== Team competition ====
Rank	Team	Vault (gymnastics)	Uneven bars	Balance beam	Floor (gymnastics)	Total	Qual.
1	France	43.166 (1)	41.799 (2)	39.832 (1)	39.266 (1)	164.063	Q
1	Juliette Bossu		14.166			164.063	Q
1	Marine Boyer	13.700		13.366	12.833	164.063	Q
1	Lorette Charpy		13.900	13.166	12.700	164.063	Q
1	Mélanie de Jesus dos Santos	14.666	13.733	13.300	13.733	164.063	Q
1	Coline Devillard	14.800				164.063	Q
2	Russia	43.166 (1)	42.232 (1)	37.432 (7)	38.632 (4)	161.462	Q
2	Lilia Akhaimova	14.500			11.733	161.462	Q
2	Irina Alexeeva		13.933	12.333		161.462	Q
2	Angelina Melnikova	14.333	14.033	12.766	13.833	161.462	Q
2	Ulyana Perebinosova		14.266			161.462	Q
2	Angelina Simakova	14.333		12.333	13.066	161.462	Q
3	Belgium	40.833 (8)	40.700 (3)	38.889 (2)	38.889 (3)	159.331	Q
3	Maellyse Brassart	13.533		13.066	12.633	159.331	Q
3	Senna Deriks		13.000			159.331	Q
3	Nina Derwael	13.600	14.400	13.500	12.866	159.331	Q
3	Axelle Klinckaert	13.700	13.300	12.333	13.400	159.331	Q
4	Great Britain	42.232 (3)	39.598 (6)	37.932 (5)	39.033 (2)	158.795	Q
4	Georgia-Mae Fenton		12.666	12.266	13.200	158.795	Q
4	Taeja James					158.795	Q
4	Alice Kinsella	14.100		12.633	12.900	158.795	Q
4	Kelly Simm	13.866	13.866	13.033	12.933	158.795	Q
4	Lucy Stanhope	14.266	13.066			158.795	Q
5	Netherlands	41.666 (4)	40.399 (4)	38.532 (4)	37.932 (6)	158.529	Q
5	Céline van Gerner		13.333	12.500	13.066	158.529	Q
5	Vera van Pol	13.800	13.400	12.666	12.166	158.529	Q
5	Naomi Visser	13.633				158.529	Q
5	Tisha Volleman	13.866			12.700	158.529	Q
5	Sanne Wevers		13.666	13.366		158.529	Q
6	Hungary	41.499 (6)	37.699 (9)	37.366 (8)	37.566 (8)	154.130	Q
6	Dorina Böczögő	13.133	12.700	12.400	12.633	154.130	Q
6	Boglárka Dévai	14.800				154.130	Q
6	Nóra Fehér		12.833	12.766	12.433	154.130	Q
6	Noémi Makra		12.166	12.200		154.130	Q
6	Sára Péter	13.566			12.500	154.130	Q
7	Spain	40.132 (10)	38.500 (7)	38.566 (3)	36.232 (14)	153.430	Q
7	Helena Bonilla	13.400	12.800	12.533		153.430	Q
7	Andrea Carmona				11.233	153.430	Q
7	Ana Pérez	13.466	13.400	13.033	12.366	153.430	Q
7	Paula Raya	13.266	12.300			153.430	Q
7	Cintia Rodriguez			13.000	12.633	153.430	Q
8	Ukraine	41.399 (7)	37.966 (8)	36.699 (10)	37.099 (9)	153.163	Q
8	Yana Fedorova		12.300			153.163	Q
8	Valeriya Osipova	14.000	11.866	12.500	12.400	153.163	Q
8	Angelina Radivilova	13.533		11.466	12.033	153.163	Q
8	Alona Titarenko					153.163	Q
8	Diana Varinska	13.866	13.800	12.733	12.666	153.163	Q
9	Italy	39.832 (11)	37.399 (10)	37.666 (6)	37.866 (7)	152.763	R1
9	Martina Basile	13.366		12.033	13.100	152.763	R1
9	Sofia Busato	13.100				152.763	R1
9	Caterina Cereghetti	13.366	12.700		12.166	152.763	R1
9	Giada Grisetti		12.533	12.833		152.763	R1
9	Francesca Linari		12.166	12.800	12.600	152.763	R1
9	Germany	39.566 (13)	40.366 (5)	32.566 (19)	38.399 (5)	150.897	R2
9	Kim Bùi	13.500	14.200		12.733	150.897	R2
9	Leah Griesser		13.266	9.633	12.900	150.897	R2
9	Emma Höfele	11.833				150.897	R2
9	Pauline Schäfer		12.900	13.500	12.766	150.897	R2
9	Sarah Voss	14.233		9.433		150.897	R2

==== Vault ====
Rank	Gymnast	D Score	E Score	Pen.	Score 1	D Score	E Score	Pen.	Score 2	Total	Qual.
Rank	Gymnast	Vault 1				Vault 2				Total	Qual.
1	(Hungary) Boglárka Dévai	6.000	8.800		14.800	5.400	9.033		14.433	14.616	Q
2	(France) Coline Devillard	5.800	9.000		14.800	4.600	8.966		13.566	14.183	Q
3	(Russia) Angelina Melnikova	5.400	8.933		14.333	5.200	8.800		14.000	14.166	Q
4	(Russia) Lilia Akhaimova	5.800	8.700		14.500	4.800	8.733		13.533	14.016	Q
5	(Romania) Denisa Golgotă	5.400	8.933		14.433	4.800	8.866		13.666	13.999	Q
6	(Netherlands) Tisha Volleman	5.400	8.833		14.233	4.800	8.700		13.500	13.866	Q
7	(Slovenia) Teja Belak	5.400	8.300		13.700	5.000	8.933		13.933	13.816	Q
8	(Germany) Sarah Voss	5.400	8.833		14.233	4.800	8.566		13.366	13.799	Q
9	(Russia) Angelina Simakova	5.800	8.633	0.100	14.333	4.600	8.633		13.233	13.783	–
10	(Slovenia) Tjaša Kysselef	4.800	8.966		13.766	5.000	8.633		13.633	13.699	R1
11	(Hungary) Sára Péter	4.600	8.966		13.566	4.800	8.833		13.633	13.599	R2
12	(Finland) Sani Mäkelä	5.000	8.800		13.800	4.800	8.566		13.366	13.583	R3

==== Uneven bars ====
Rank	Gymnast	D Score	E Score	Pen.	Total	Qual.
1	(Sweden) Jonna Adlerteg	6.200	8.400		14.600	Q
2	(Belgium) Nina Derwael	6.300	8.100		14.400	Q
3	(Russia) Ulyana Perebinosova	6.100	8.166		14.266	Q
4	(Germany) Kim Bùi	6.000	8.200		14.200	Q
5	(France) Juliette Bossu	6.000	8.166		14.166	Q
6	(Russia) Angelina Melnikova	5.900	8.133		14.033	Q
7	(Russia) Irina Alexeeva	5.900	8.033		13.933	–
8	(France) Lorette Charpy	5.800	8.100		13.900	Q
9	(United Kingdom) Kelly Simm	6.000	7.866		13.866	Q
10	(Ukraine) Diana Varinska	5.900	7.900		13.800	R1
11	(France) Mélanie de Jesus dos Santos	5.800	7.933		13.733	–
12	(Netherlands) Sanne Wevers	5.100	8.566		13.666	R2
13	(Netherlands) Vera van Pol	5.200	8.200		13.400	R3

==== Balance beam ====
Rank	Gymnast	D Score	E Score	Pen.	Total	Qual.
1	(Belgium) Nina Derwael	5.000	8.500		13.500	Q
2	(Germany) Pauline Schäfer	5.300	8.200		13.500	Q
3	(Switzerland) Ilaria Käslin	5.400	8.000		13.400	Q
4	(Netherlands) Sanne Wevers	5.500	7.866		13.366	Q
5	(France) Marine Boyer	5.900	7.466		13.366	Q
6	(France) Mélanie de Jesus dos Santos	5.400	7.900		13.300	Q
7	(France) Lorette Charpy	5.500	7.666		13.166	–
8	(Belgium) Maellyse Brassart	5.200	7.866		13.066	Q
9	(Greece) Vasiliki Millousi	5.400	7.666		13.066	Q
10	(United Kingdom) Kelly Simm	4.900	8.133		13.033	R1
11	(Spain) Ana Pérez	5.100	7.933		13.033	R2
12	(Spain) Cintia Rodríguez	4.900	8.100		13.000	R3

==== Floor ====
Rank	Gymnast	D Score	E Score	Pen.	Total	Qual.
1	(Russia) Angelina Melnikova	5.900	8.033	0.100	13.833	Q
2	(France) Mélanie de Jesus dos Santos	5.500	8.233		13.733	Q
3	(Belgium) Axelle Klinckaert	5.300	8.100		13.400	Q
4	(United Kingdom) Georgia-Mae Fenton	4.800	8.400		13.200	Q
5	(Romania) Denisa Golgotă	5.200	7.966		13.166	Q
6	(Sweden) Jessica Castles	4.900	8.200		13.100	Q
7	(Italy) Martina Basile	5.200	7.900		13.100	Q
8	(Netherlands) Céline van Gerner	4.600	8.466		13.066	Q
9	(Russia) Angelina Simakova	4.900	8.166		13.066	R1
10	(United Kingdom) Kelly Simm	5.000	7.933		12.933	R2
11	(Germany) Leah Griesser	4.800	8.100		12.900	R3

=== Junior ===
==== Vault ====
Rank	Gymnast	D Score	E Score	Pen.	Score 1	D Score	E Score	Pen.	Score 2	Total	Qual.
Rank	Gymnast	Vault 1				Vault 2				Total	Qual.
1	(Italy) Giorgia Villa	5.400	9.266		14.666	4.600	9.233		13.833	14.249	Q
2	(Ukraine) Anastasia Bachynska	5.000	9.066		14.066	4.600	9.233		13.833	13.949	Q
3	(United Kingdom) Amelie Morgan	5.400	8.866	0.300	13.966	4.600	9.266		13.866	13.916	Q
4	(Russia) Vladislava Urazova	5.000	8.933		13.933	4.600	9.233		13.833	13.883	Q
5	(Italy) Asia D'Amato	5.400	9.000		14.400	5.200	8.366	0.300	13.266	13.833	Q
6	(Hungary) Csenge Bácskay	4.600	9.066		13.666	5.000	8.833		13.833	13.749	Q
7	(Romania) Silviana Sfiringu	5.400	8.766	0.100	14.066	5.000	8.600	0.300	13.300	13.683	Q
8	(Russia) Olga Astafyeva	4.600	8.933		13.533	5.000	8.800		13.800	13.666	Q
9	(France) Claire Pontlevoy	5.400	8.400	0.100	13.700	4.600	8.966		13.566	13.633	R1
10	(Germany) Lisa Zimmermann	4.800	8.800		13.600	4.600	8.933		13.533	13.566	R2
11	(Hungary) Bianka Schermann	4.600	8.833	0.100	13.333	4.600	8.766	0.100	13.266	13.299	R3

==== Uneven bars ====
Rank	Gymnast	D Score	E Score	Pen.	Total	Qual.
1	(Russia) Ksenia Klimenko	5.900	8.433		14.333	Q
2	(Russia) Irina Komnova	5.900	8.266		14.166	Q
3	(France) Carolann Héduit	6.200	7.833		14.033	Q
4	(Netherlands) Astrid de Zeeuw	5.500	8.466		13.966	Q
5	(Italy) Giorgia Villa	5.800	8.166		13.966	Q
6	(Italy) Elisa Iorio	5.900	8.000		13.900	Q
7	(Hungary) Zója Székely	5.600	8.100		13.700	Q
8	(Belarus) Anastsiya Alistratava	5.500	8.000		13.500	Q
9	(Italy) Asia D'Amato	5.800	7.633		13.433	–
10	(France) Claire Pontlevoy	5.800	7.566		13.366	R1
11	(United Kingdom) Amelie Morgan	5.100	8.233		13.333	R2
12	(United Kingdom) Annie Young	4.900	8.300		13.200	R3

==== Balance beam ====
Rank	Gymnast	D Score	E Score	Pen.	Total	Qual.
1	(United Kingdom) Amelie Morgan	5.300	8.200		13.500	Q
2	(Italy) Giorgia Villa	5.200	8.033		13.233	Q
3	(Ukraine) Daria Murzhak	5.100	8.066		13.166	Q
4	(United Kingdom) Halle Hilton	5.000	8.133		13.133	Q
5	(Italy) Elisa Iorio	5.100	8.000		13.100	Q
6	(Russia) Ksenia Klimenko	5.600	7.433		13.033	Q
7	(Belgium) Fien Enghels	4.700	8.300		13.000	Q
8	(Romania) Silviana Sfiringu	5.000	7.966		12.966	Q
9	(Russia) Olga Astafyeva	5.400	7.500		12.900	R1
10	(France) Alizee Letrange	4.900	7.966		12.866	R2
11	(Belgium) Noemie Louon	4.500	8.233		12.733	R3

==== Floor ====
Rank	Gymnast	D Score	E Score	Pen.	Total	Qual.
1	(Russia) Vladislava Urazova	5.300	8.200		13.500	Q
2	(Romania) Antonia Duta	5.000	8.266		13.266	Q
3	(Romania) Ioana Stănciulescu	5.400	7.933	0.100	13.233	Q
4	(Italy) Giorgia Villa	5.200	8.100	0.100	13.200	Q
5	(Romania) Silviana Sfiringu	5.100	8.100		13.200	–
6	(Russia) Olga Astafyeva	4.900	8.266		13.166	Q
7	(France) Claire Pontlevoy	4.900	8.133		13.033	Q
7	(United Kingdom) Amelie Morgan	4.900	8.133		13.033	Q
9	(Netherlands) Sara van Disseldorp	4.600	8.400		13.000	Q
10	(United Kingdom) Phoebe Jakubczyk	4.900	8.100		13.000	R1
11	(Belgium) Jade Vansteenkiste	4.800	8.133		12.933	R2
12	(France) Mathilde Wahl	4.600	8.266		12.866	R3

== Participating countries ==
Seniors
Austria (AUT): Bianca Frysak; Elisa Hämmerle; Jasmin Mader; Marlies Männersdorfer; Alissa Mörz; ~~Tamara Stadelmann~~	Azerbaijan (AZE): Yuliya Inshina; Marina Nekrasova; Mariia Smirnova	Belgium (BEL): Maellyse Brassart; Nina Derwael; ~~Rune Hermans~~ (withdrew due to injury); Axelle Klinckaert; ~~Julie Meyers~~ (withdrew due to injury); Senna Deriks (replacement)	Bulgaria (BUL): Greta Banishka; Pamela Georgieva	Croatia (CRO): Christina Zwicker
Cyprus (CYP): Gloria Philassides; Anastasia Theocharous	Czech Republic (CZE): Kristýna Brabcová; Sabina Hálová; Aneta Holasová; Lucie Jiříková; Dominika Ponížilová	Denmark (DEN): Sofia Bjørnholdt; Mette Hulgaard; Victoria Kajø; Linnea Wang; Emilie Winther	Spain (ESP): Helena Bonilla; ~~Nora Fernandez~~ (withdrew due to injury); Ana Pérez; Paula Raya; Cintia Rodríguez; Andrea Carmona (replacement)	Finland (FIN): Enni Kettunen; Maija Leinonen; Sani Mäkelä; Helmi Murto; Siiri Saukkonen
France (FRA): Juliette Bossu; Marine Boyer; Lorette Charpy; Mélanie de Jesus dos Santos; Coline Devillard	(United Kingdom) Great Britain (GBR): ~~Becky Downie~~ (injured during PT); Georgia-Mae Fenton; Alice Kinsella; Kelly Simm; Lucy Stanhope; Taeja James	(Georgia (country)) Georgia (GEO): Anna Subbotina	Germany (GER): Kim Bui; Leah Griesser; Pauline Schäfer; ~~Sophie Scheder~~ (withdrew due to injury); Sarah Voss; Emma Höfele (replacement)	Greece (GRE): Argyro Afrati; Vasiliki Millousi; Evangelia Monokrousou; Evangelia Plyta; Ioanna Xoulogi
Hungary (HUN): Dorina Böczögő; Boglárka Dévai; Nóra Fehér; ~~Zsófia Kovács~~ (withdrew due to injury); Sára Péter; Noémi Makra (replacement)	(Republic of Ireland) Ireland (IRL): Meaghan Smith	Iceland (ISL): Thelma Aðalsteinsdóttir; Sigríður Bergþórsdóttir; Margrét Kristinsdóttir; ~~Lilja Ólafsdóttir~~; Agnes Suto-Tuuha	Israel (ISR): ~~Ofir Kremer~~; ~~Meitar Lavy~~; Ofir Netzer; ~~Shailee Weiss~~	Italy (ITA): Martina Basile; Giada Grisetti; ~~Martina Maggio~~ (withdrew due to injury); ~~Elisa Meneghini~~; ~~Lara Mori~~ (withdrew due to injury); Francesca Linari (replacement); Caterina Cereghetti (replacement); Sofia Busato (replacement)
Latvia (LAT): Anastasija Dubova; Marija Ribaļčenko; Linda Tugarinova; Elīna Vihrova	Lithuania (LTU): Agata Vostruchovaitė	Luxembourg (LUX): Aurelie Keller	Netherlands (NED): Céline van Gerner; Vera van Pol; ~~Eythora Thorsdottir~~ (withdrew due to injury); Tisha Volleman; Sanne Wevers; Naomi Visser (replacement)	Norway (NOR): Sara Davidsen; Julie Erichsen; Edel Fosse; Thea Nygaard; Julie Søderstrøm
Poland (POL): Gabriela Janik; Katarzyna Jurkowska-Kowalska; ~~Klara Kopeć~~; Wiktoria Łopuszanska; Marta Pihan-Kulesza (replacement)	Portugal (POR): Beatriz Dias; ~~Rafaela Ferreira~~; Filipa Martins; Mariana Pitrez; Leonor Silva; Mariana Marianito (replacement)	Romania (ROU): Carmen Ghiciuc; Denisa Golgotă; Laura Iacob; Nica Ivănuș; ~~Anamaria Ocolișan~~ (injured during PT)	Russia (RUS): Lilia Akhaimova; ~~Maria Kharenkova~~; ~~Viktoria Komova~~; Angelina Melnikova; Angelina Simakova; Irina Alexeeva (replacement); Uliana Perebinosova (replacement)	Slovenia (SLO): Teja Belak; Lucija Hribar; Tjaša Kysselef; Adela Šajn
Switzerland (SUI): ~~Lynn Genhart~~ (withdrew due to injury); Ilaria Käslin; Leonie Meier; Stefanie Siegenthaler; ~~Giulia Steingruber~~ (withdrew due to injury); Thea Brogli (replacement); Anina Wildi (replacement)	Slovakia (SVK): Chiara Bunce; Radoslava Kalamárová; Ema Kuklovská; Barbora Mokošová; Karolína Takáčová	Sweden (SWE): Jonna Adlerteg; Jessica Castles	Turkey (TUR): Seher Atalay; Demet Mutlu; İlayda Şahin; Göksu Üçtaş; Tutya Yılmaz	Ukraine (UKR): Yana Fedorova; Valeriya Osipova; Angelina Radivilova; Alona Titarenko; Diana Varinska

	Juniors			
Armenia (ARM): Anahit Assadourian	Austria (AUT): Lorena Böhmberger; Ceren Kaya; Mirjam Trbara; ~~Christina Wegscheider~~; Nicol Wimmer; Pirjo Wolfisberg	Azerbaijan (AZE): Samira Gahrahamnova	Belgium (BEL): Stacy Bertrandt; Margaux Daveloose; Fien Enghels; Lisa Vaelen; Jade Vansteenkiste	Belarus (BLR): Anastasiya Alistratava; Ganna Metelitsa; Kseniya Pilets; Anastasiya Savitskaya; Aliaksandra Varabyova
Bulgaria (BUL): Raya Apostolova	Cyprus (CYP): Christina Eleftheriou	Czech Republic (CZE): Magdaléna Coufalová; Jasmína Hnilicová; Tamara Kalašová; ~~Natálie Klaková~~; Natálie Riantová; Natálie Brabcová (replacement)	Denmark (DEN): Isabella Bøckhaus; ~~Louisa Lorentzen~~; Freja Petersen; Camille Rasmussen; Mathilde Bentsen (replacement)	Spain (ESP): Alba Asencio; Lorena Medina; Alba Petisco; ~~Berta Pujadas~~ (injured during PT); Claudia Villalba
Finland (FIN): Iida Haapala; Ada Hautala; Saara Kokko; Sara Loikas; Nitta Nieminen	France (FRA): ~~Julia Forestier~~ (withdrew due to injury); Carolann Héduit; Alizee Letrange-Mouakit; Claire Pontlevoy; Mathilde Wahl; Aline Friess (replacement)	(United Kingdom) Great Britain (GBR): Ondine Achampong; Halle Hilton; Phoebe Jakubczyk; Amelie Morgan; Annie Young	Germany (GER): Lara Hinsberger; Emma Malewski; Leonie Papke; Emelie Petz; Lisa Zimmermann	Greece (GRE): Chrysa Balami; Elvira Katsali; Varvara Litsa; Asimina Sevastopoulou; Magdalini Tsiori
Hungary (HUN): Csenge Bácskay; Regina Medved; Bianka Schermann; Zója Székely; Hanna Szujó	(Republic of Ireland) Ireland (IRL): Jane Heffernan; Blathnaid Higgins; Kate Molloy; Emma Slevin	Iceland (ISL): Soley Guðmundsdóttir; Guðrún Harðardóttir; Laufey Jóhannsdóttir; Vigdís Pálmadóttir; Emilia Sigurjónsdóttir	Israel (ISR): Emilia Babich; ~~Noam Dadon~~; Dana Negru; Lihi Raz; Noga Shalit; Geffen Dor (replacement)	Italy (ITA): Alice D’Amato; Asia D’Amato; Alessia Federici; Elisa Iorio; Giorgia Villa
Latvia (LAT): Anna Ločmele; Maija Ojere; Arīna Oļenova; ~~Zane Petrova~~; Marija Šajovko	Lithuania (LTU): Eglė Stalinkevičiūtė	Luxembourg (LUX): Chiara Castellucci; Céleste Mordenti; Lola Schleich	Netherlands (NED): Astrid de Zeeuw; Vera Jonker; Zenna van der Lubbe; Sara van Disseldorp; Shadé van Oorschot	Norway (NOR): Sarah Halvorsen; Selma Halvorsen; Mari Kanter; Aino Namtvedt; Åsne Øyulvstad
Poland (POL): Wiktoria Giemza; Wanda Mnich; Natalia Pawlak; Kaja Skalska	Portugal (POR): Beatriz Cardoso; ~~Lia Sobral~~	Romania (ROU): ~~Iulia Berar~~; Antonia Duta; Ana Maria Puiu; Silviana Sfiringu; Ioana Stănciulescu; Daniela Trica (replacement)	Russia (RUS): Olga Astafyeva; ~~Daria Belousova~~; Ksenia Klimenko; Vladislava Urazova; Yana Vorona; Irina Komnova (replacement)	Slovenia (SLO): Zala Bedenik; Meta Kunaver
Switzerland (SUI): Lena Bickel; Nina Ferrazzini; Alessia Gresser; Anastassia Pascu; Lou Steffen	Slovakia (SVK): Kristína Pýchová; Elena Ušáková	Sweden (SWE): Tonya Paulsson	Turkey (TUR): Cemre Kendirci; Nazlı Savranbaşı; Yaren Turan; Ece Yağmur Yavuz; Dilara Yurtdaş	Ukraine (UKR): Anastasia Bachynska; Yelyzaveta Hubareva; Kateryna Kulinii; Tetiana Mokliak; Daria Murzhak

== Overall medal table ==
Rank	Nation	Gold	Silver	Bronze	Total
1	Italy (ITA)	4	2	1	7
2	Russia (RUS)	2	3	2	7
3	France (FRA)	1	1	2	4
4	Belgium (BEL)	1	1	1	3
4	Romania (ROU)	1	1	1	3
6	Netherlands (NED)	1	0	1	2
7	Hungary (HUN)	1	0	0	1
8	Great Britain (GBR)	0	2	3	5
9	Sweden (SWE)	0	1	0	1
Totals (9 entries)		11	11	11	33

== See also ==
- 2018 European Men's Artistic Gymnastics Championships
