= Claire Pontlevoy =

French artistic gymnast

- Full name: Claire Pontlevoy
- Born: 17 November 2003 (age 22) Kourou, French Guiana

Gymnastics career
- Discipline: Women's artistic gymnastics
- Country represented: France (2017–2023 (FRA))
- Club: Avoine Beaumont Gymnastique
- Gym: INSEP
- Head coaches: Martine George, Nellu Pop, Alizée Dal Santo
- Former coaches: Marc Chirilcenco, Gina Chirilcenco
- Retired: 1 February 2023

Claire Pontlevoy (French: [klɛːʁ pɔ̃l(ə)vwa]; born 17 November 2003) is a retired French artistic gymnast. She was part of the French team at the 2019 World Artistic Gymnastics Championships. She retired in February 2023 after struggling since January 2020 with constant injuries preventing her of training properly and competing.

== Competitive History ==
Year	Event	Team	AA	VT	UB	BB	FX
Junior
2017	French Championships		9				
2017	FIT Challenge	2nd place, silver medalist(s)	22				
2018	Top 12 Series 3	1st place, gold medalist(s)		2nd place, silver medalist(s)		3rd place, bronze medalist(s)	
2018	Top 12 Series 4	1st place, gold medalist(s)		5	2nd place, silver medalist(s)	2nd place, silver medalist(s)	2nd place, silver medalist(s)
2018	Top 12 Final	2nd place, silver medalist(s)	3rd place, bronze medalist(s)	4	6	4	4
2018	City of Jesolo Trophy	3rd place, bronze medalist(s)	22		7		
2018	French Championships		6		3rd place, bronze medalist(s)		
2018	Pieve di Soligo	2nd place, silver medalist(s)	4	6	9	4	4
2018	European Championships	5	13				8
2018	Top 12 Series 2	1st place, gold medalist(s)				2nd place, silver medalist(s)	
Senior
2019	Top 12 Series 3	1st place, gold medalist(s)		1st place, gold medalist(s)	2nd place, silver medalist(s)		
2019	Top 12 Semi-Finals	2nd place, silver medalist(s)			1st place, gold medalist(s)	2nd place, silver medalist(s)	3rd place, bronze medalist(s)
2019	DTB Team Challenge	4	10				
2019	Top 12 Finals	2nd place, silver medalist(s)			2nd place, silver medalist(s)	6	3rd place, bronze medalist(s)
2019	French Championships		3rd place, bronze medalist(s)		3rd place, bronze medalist(s)		
2019	Worms Friendly	3rd place, bronze medalist(s)	7	12	17	10	4
2019	World Championships	5			R3		
