= Denisa Golgotă =

Romanian artistic gymnast

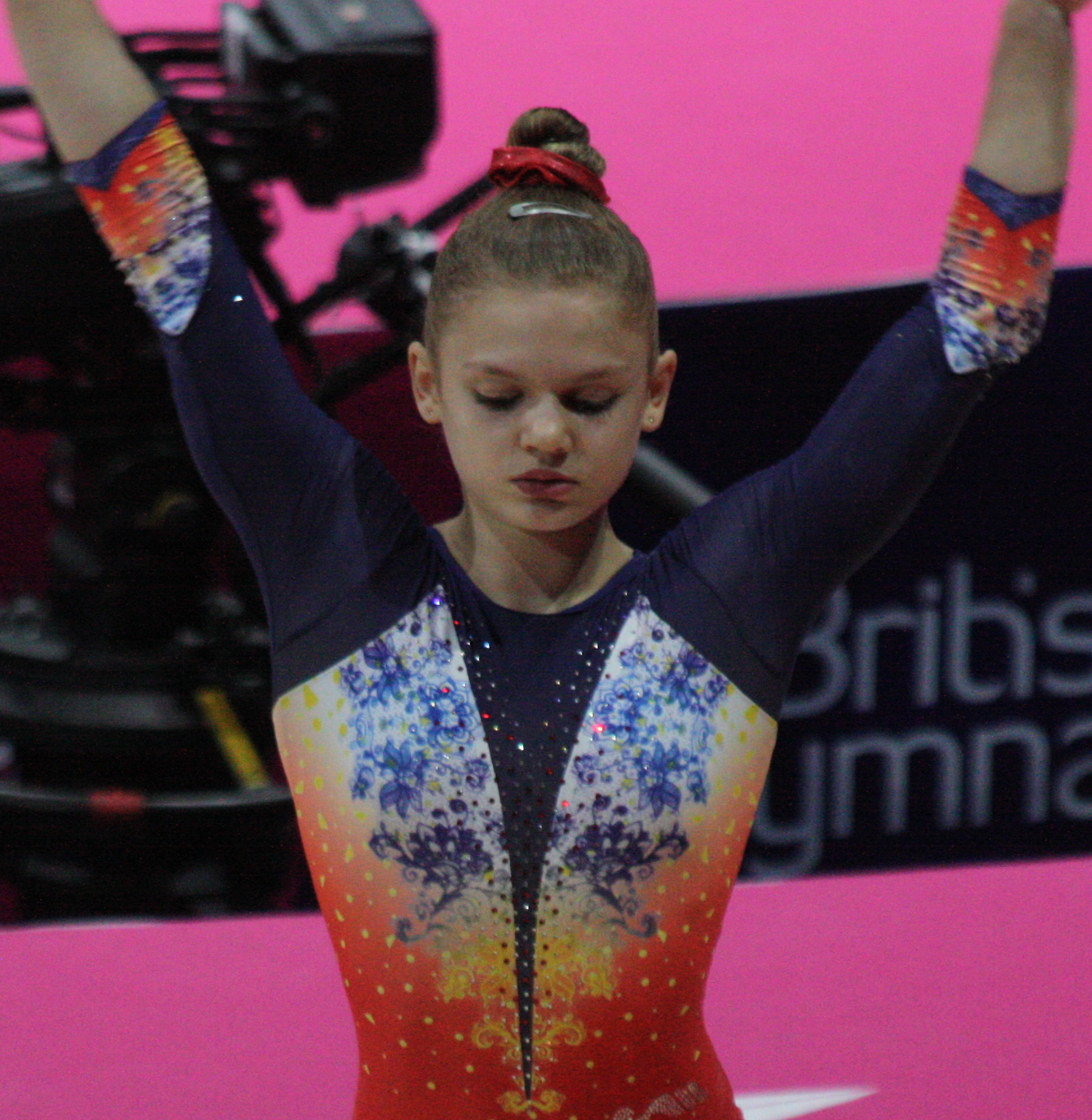
- Golgotă at the 2018 European Championships.

Personal information
- Born: 8 March 2002 (age 24) Alimpești, Romania

Gymnastics career
- Discipline: Women's artistic gymnastics
- Country represented: Romania (2016–20, 2025–present)
- College team: California Golden Bears
- Club: Cetate Deva
- Head coaches: Mirela Dicu, Cristian Enoiu
Medal record
Representing Romania
European Championships
Silver medal – second place	2018 Glasgow	Floor exercise
Bronze medal – third place	2018 Glasgow	Vault
FIG World Cup
Event	1st	2nd	3rd
World Challenge Cup	1	2	1
Total	1	2	1

Denisa Golgotă (born 8 March 2002) is a Romanian artistic gymnast. She won two medals at the 2018 European Championships – a silver on floor exercise and a bronze on vault.

== Personal life ==
Denisa Golgotă was born on 8 March 2002 in Alimpești, Gorj County. In 2016, she was awarded the title of citizen of honor of Alimpești by local authorities.

== Junior career ==
=== 2015 ===
At her first Romanian National Championships, Golgotă won bronze with her team, and individually, she won gold on vault, placed sixth on floor and eighth in the all-around and on balance beam.

=== 2016 ===
Golgotă made her international debut at the International Gymnix in Montreal, Canada. She finished fourth on vault, fifth with her team, and twenty-second in the all-around. Golgotă won a team gold medal against Belgium at the Belgium Friendly along with teammates Olivia Cimpian, Carmen Ghiciuc, Ioana Crisan, and Alisia Botnaru. Additionally, Golgotă won the gold on vault and finished fifth in the all-around. The same team defeated France at the France vs Romania Friendly, and Golgotă won a gold medal on vault and a silver medal on floor.

Golgotă was selected to represent Romanian at the 2016 Junior European Championships along with Alisia Botnaru, Olivia Cîmpian, Ioana Crișan, and Carmen Ghiciuc. The team won a bronze medal, and individually, Golgotă won a gold medal on floor and a silver medal on vault. At the Romanian National Championships, she defended her vault title, won silver with her team and on floor, and placed fifth in the all-around. At the Junior National Championships, Golgotă won the gold on vault and the silver on floor. She also placed fourth in the all-around, seventh on uneven bars, and fifth on balance beam. She finished her season at the Tournoi International with a sixth place finish in the all-around.

=== 2017 ===
Golgotă competed at the 2017 European Youth Summer Olympic Festival in Győr, Hungary along with Iulia Berar and Nica Ivanus. As a team, they finished tenth. Individually, Golgotă finished fifteenth in the all-around, and she won a silver medal on vault. At the 2017 Romanian National Championships, Golgotă won a gold medal with her team and a silver medal in the all-around behind Larisa Iordache. Additionally, she defended her vault title, won a bronze medal on floor, and placed eighth on uneven bars. She competed at the Japan Junior International on vault, uneven bars, and balance beam, but she did not advance to the event finals.

== Senior career ==
=== 2018 ===
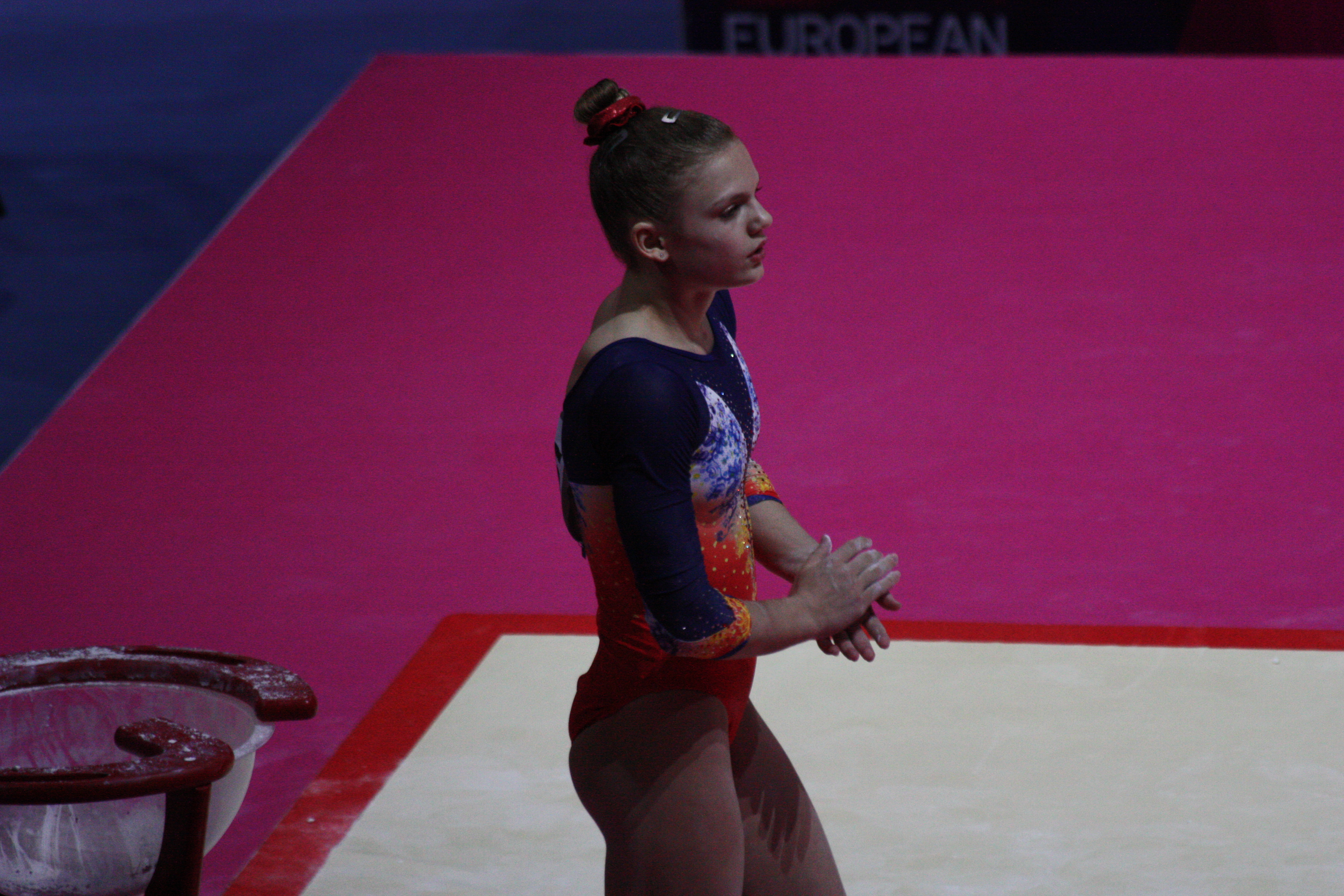
Golgotă during the 2018 European Championships.

In 2018 Golgotă made her debut as a senior at the City of Jesolo Trophy where she finished twelfth in the all-around and fourth on vault. Then, at the Deva Friendly, Golgotă won gold medals with the team, in the all-around, and on vault and floor exercise. She competed at Koper Challenge Cup in Slovenia and placed second in the vault and floor finals and third in the balance beam final. At the Izvorani Friendly, Golgotă swept the gold medals.

She was selected to compete at the 2018 European Championships along with Laura Iacob, Carmen Ghiciuc, Nica Ivanus. The team finished twelfth and did not qualify for the team final. Golgotă qualified to finals in both the vault and floor exercise in 5th place. She improved upon those placements in both finals, receiving the bronze medal on vault and the silver medal on floor exercise. At the Varsenare Friendly, Golgotă won a gold on vault, a silver on floor, and a bronze with the team. She also finished fourth in the all-around. Golgotă withdrew from the 2018 Romanian National Championships because of a muscle contracture in her leg; she did not want to risk further injury before the World Championships. She was named to the Romanian team for the 2018 World Championships along with Ioana Crișan, Maria Holbura, Nica Ivanus, and Carmen Ghiciuc. The team placed thirteenth, and Golgotă placed seventeenth in the all-around. Golgotă finished her season at the Cottbus World Cup where she placed eighth on beam.

=== 2019 ===
Golgotă began her season at the 2019 European Championships and placed fourth on floor, fifth on beam, sixth on vault, and seventeenth in the all-around. She next competed at the Flanders International Team Challenge where she placed 10th in the all-around and helped Romania finish fifth as a team. In late June Golgotă competed at the European Games where she qualified to the all-around, balance beam, and floor exercise finals. During the all-around final she placed 11th. On balance beam she placed fourth behind Nina Derwael, Angelina Melnikova, and Diana Varinska and on floor exercise she finished sixth. In September she competed at the Romanian National Championships where she placed sixth in the all-around but second amongst seniors. For event finals she won silver on vault and floor exercise behind junior Ioana Stănciulescu.

Golgotă was later selected to represent Romania at the 2019 World Championships. During qualifications Romania finished 22nd and did not qualify a team to the 2020 Olympic Games. Individually Golgotă finished 77th in the all-around qualifications and did not qualify as an individual to the Olympic Games due to teammate Maria Holbura placing higher (54th). She ended the season competing at the Cottbus World Cup where she placed seventh on floor exercise.

=== 2020 ===
In April 2020, in a Televiziunea Română interview with Monica Roşu, it was revealed that Golgotă had retired from artistic gymnastics.

=== 2025 ===
In 2025, Golgotă made her return to gymnastics at the 2025 City of Jesolo Trophy. She was then selected to compete at the 2025 European Championships alongside Ana Bărbosu, Lilia Cosman, Sabrina Voinea, and Ella Oprea. They finished fourth as a team, and individually, Golgotă qualified to the all-around and balance beam finals, where she finished seventh and eighth respectively.

She was selected for the 2025 World Championships, where she finished in 7th place in the floor exercise final and was a reserve for the all-around final. At the competition, she struggled with food poisioning. After returning home, she filed a complaint with the Romanian Gymnastics Federation, which she said was ignored, for bullying and harassment; she alleged that other gymnasts said they heard another person repeatedly threaten that they wanted to hit her until she was disfigured. Although Golgotă did not wish to name this person, media reported that it was teammate Sabrina Voinea.

== NCAA ==
On July 15, 2026, Golgotă announced that she had signed with the California Golden Bears for NCAA gymnastics in the United States.

== Competitive history ==
Competitive history of Denisa Golgotă at the junior level
Year	Event	Team	AA	VT	UB	BB	FX
2015	National Championships	3rd place, bronze medalist(s)	8	1st place, gold medalist(s)		8	6
2016	International Gymnix Junior Cup	5	22	4			
2016	Belgium-Romania Friendly	1st place, gold medalist(s)	5				
2016	France-Romania Friendly	1st place, gold medalist(s)					
2016	Junior European Championships	3rd place, bronze medalist(s)		2nd place, silver medalist(s)			1st place, gold medalist(s)
2016	National Championships	2nd place, silver medalist(s)	5	1st place, gold medalist(s)			2nd place, silver medalist(s)
2016	Junior National Championships		4	1st place, gold medalist(s)	7	5	2nd place, silver medalist(s)
2016	Tournoi International		6				
2017	European Youth Olympic Festival	10	15	2nd place, silver medalist(s)			
2017	National Championships	1st place, gold medalist(s)	2nd place, silver medalist(s)	1st place, gold medalist(s)	8		3rd place, bronze medalist(s)

Competitive history of Denisa Golgotă at the senior level
Year	Event	Team	AA	VT	UB	BB	FX
2018	City of Jesolo Trophy		12	4			
2018	Deva Friendly	1st place, gold medalist(s)	1st place, gold medalist(s)	1st place, gold medalist(s)			1st place, gold medalist(s)
2018	Koper World Challenge Cup			2nd place, silver medalist(s)	6	3rd place, bronze medalist(s)	2nd place, silver medalist(s)
2018	Izvorani Friendly	1st place, gold medalist(s)	1st place, gold medalist(s)	1st place, gold medalist(s)	1st place, gold medalist(s)	1st place, gold medalist(s)	1st place, gold medalist(s)
2018	European Championships	12		3rd place, bronze medalist(s)			2nd place, silver medalist(s)
2018	Varsenare Friendly	3rd place, bronze medalist(s)	4	1st place, gold medalist(s)			2nd place, silver medalist(s)
2018	World Championships		17				R2
2018	Cottbus World Cup					8	
2019
2019	European Championships		17	6		5	4
2019	European Games		11			4	6
2019	National Championships	2nd place, silver medalist(s)	6	2nd place, silver medalist(s)		5	2nd place, silver medalist(s)
2019	Cottbus World Cup						7
2025	City of Jesolo Trophy	6					
2025	Saint Étienne Friendly	2nd place, silver medalist(s)					
2025	European Championships	4	7			8	
2025	Szombathely World Challenge Cup						1st place, gold medalist(s)
2025	National Championships	1st place, gold medalist(s)	1st place, gold medalist(s)				
2025	World Championships	—N/a	R3				7
