= Juliette Bossu =

French artistic gymnast

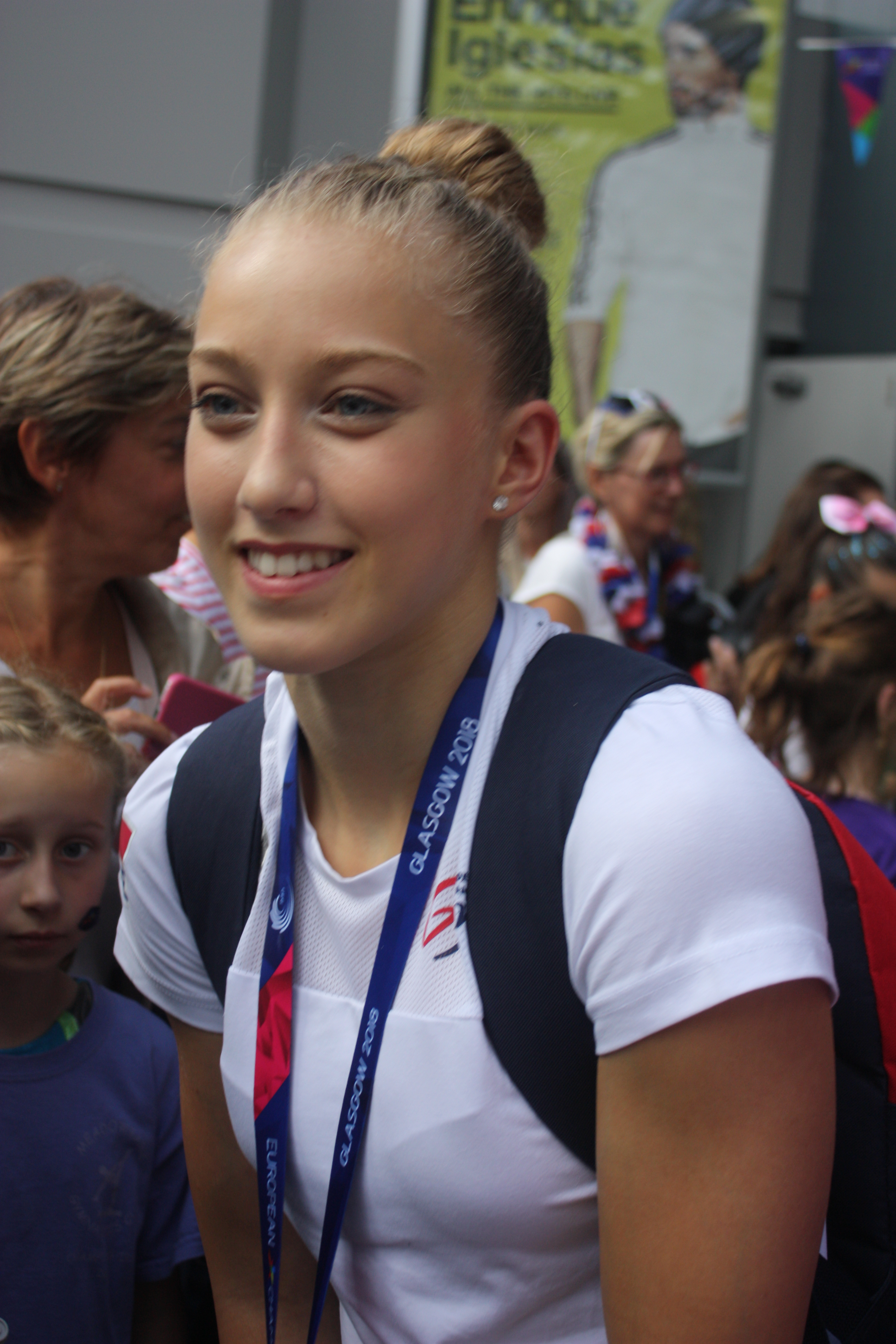
- Bossu in 2018

Personal information
- Full name: Juliette Bossu
- Born: Mulhouse, France

Gymnastics career
- Discipline: Women's artistic gymnastics
- Country represented: France (2014–2019 (FRA))
- Retired: 2019
Medal record
Representing France
European Championships
Silver medal – second place	2018 Glasgow	Team

Juliette Bossu is a French retired gymnast.

In 2015 Bossu competed in the 2015 European Youth Summer Olympic Festival in Tbilisi. Bossu a two time gold medalist at the 2016 and 2017 French Gymnastics Championships appeared at four national championships and won a total of five medals. In 2018 Bossu won silver in the team event at the 2018 European Championships in Glasgow.

At the French Nationals in May 2018, Bossu competed only on uneven bars, winning silver in the event final. In September, she competed at the Paris World Cup, winning the gold medal on the uneven bars. She was named to the French team for the World Artistic Gymnastics Championships in Doha, Qatar in late October. She again only competed on uneven bars and contributed to France's fifth-place finish in the team final. After Doha, she competed at the Cottbus World Cup in Germany in November, but didn't make the event finals. On August 10, 2019 Bossu announced her retirement on her Instagram.

== Medal table ==
Juliette Bossu competition results and medals
Year	Event	Discipline				
Year	Event	AA	FX	BB	TF	UB
2014	French Gymnastics Championships	6th	—	—	—	—
2014	Romania-France-Belgium Friendly	14th	—	—	3rd	—
2014	Top Gym	4th	3rd	—	7th	—
2015	French Gymnastics Championships	7th	—	—	—	—
2015	France-Great Britain-Switzerland Friendly	2nd	—	—	1st	—
2015	European Youth Summer Olympic Festival	10th	4th	—	6th	—
2016	French Gymnastic Championships	2nd	1st	—	—	7th
2017	City of Jesolo Trophy	25th	—	—	4th	—
2017	French Gymnastics Championships	4th	1st	—	—	3rd
2017	Flanders International Team Challenge	6th	—	—	2nd	—
2017	Élite Gym Massilia	4th	1st	2nd	1st	—
2017	Toyota International	—	4th	—	—	3rd
2018	French Gymnastics Championships	—	—	—	—	2nd
2018	Sainté Gym Cup	—	—	—	1st	—
2018	European Championships	—	—	—	2nd	7th
2018	Paris World Cup	—	—	—	—	1st
2018	World Artistic Gymnastics Championships	—	—	—	5th	—
