= Martina Maggio =

Italian artistic gymnast

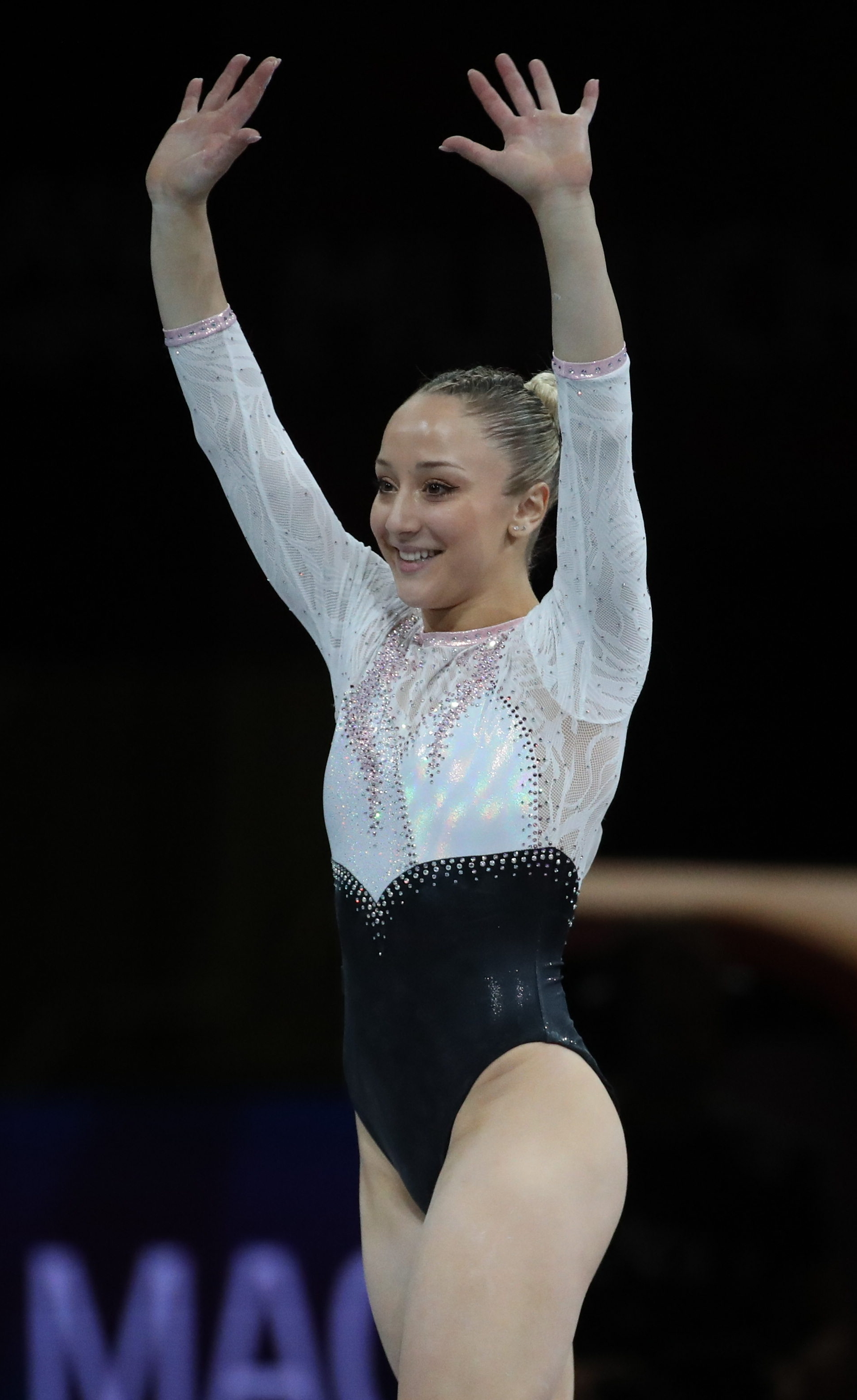
- Maggio at the 2022 European Championships

Personal information
- Full name: Martina Maggio
- Born: July 26, 2001 (age 25) Villasanta, Italy

Gymnastics career
- Discipline: Women's artistic gymnastics
- Country represented: Italy; (2014–present)
- Club: Robur et Virtus; Fiamme Oro
- Gym: Brixia
- Head coach: Enrico Casella
Medal record
Women's artistic gymnastics
Representing Italy
World Championships
Bronze medal – third place	2019 Stuttgart	Team
European Championships
Gold medal – first place	2022 Munich	Team
Silver medal – second place	2022 Munich	Floor exercise
Bronze medal – third place	2022 Munich	All-around
Mediterranean Games
Gold medal – first place	2022 Oran	Team
Gold medal – first place	2022 Oran	All-around
Gold medal – first place	2022 Oran	Balance beam
Silver medal – second place	2022 Oran	Uneven bars
Silver medal – second place	2022 Oran	Floor exercise

Martina Maggio (born July 26, 2001) is an Italian artistic gymnast. She represented Italy at the 2020 Olympic Games. She was a member of the gold medal winning teams at the 2022 Mediterranean Games and the 2022 European Championships. She was also the alternate for the team who won bronze at the 2019 World Championships in Stuttgart. Individually she is the 2022 Mediterranean Games all-around champion, the 2022 European all-around bronze medalist, the 2022 European silver medalist on floor, and 2016 European junior vault champion.

== Early life ==
Martina Maggio was born in Villasanta, Italy on July 26, 2001. In 2014, she moved to Brescia to train at the International Academy of Brixia.

== Junior gymnastics career ==
=== 2014 ===
Maggio competed at the Golden League where she placed 16th in the all-around and sixth on the balance beam. Maggio made her international debut at the Camaiore Trophy where she helped Italy place first ahead of France and Mexico. She next competed at the Iuvenila Cup in Mexico where Italy once again won gold, this time ahead of Germany and Brazil. Individually Maggio won gold in the all-around ahead of Thaís Fidélis, vault, uneven bars, and balance beam. She won bronze on floor exercise.

=== 2015 ===
In 2015 Maggio was selected to represent Italy at the European Youth Olympic Festival alongside Caterina Cereghetti and Francesca Linari. Together they placed fifth in the team competition. Individually Maggio placed 13th in the all-around, fourth on balance beam, and eighth on floor exercise. She later competed at the Elite Gym Massilia where she helped Italy place fifth and she placed 17th in the all-around.

=== 2016 ===
Maggio competed at the first and second Italian Serie A2 competitions, winning silver in the all-around at both. She next competed at the City of Jesolo Trophy where she placed seventh in the all-around. During event finals she placed second on vault behind Jordan Chiles, second on balance beam behind Emma Malabuyo, and third on floor exercise behind Trinity Thomas and Malabuyo. Maggio next competed at the third and fourth Italian Serie A2 competitions where she placed first and second respectively.

Maggio competed at a friendly competition amongst junior competitors where she placed third in the all-around behind Alice Kinsella of Great Britain and compatriot Giorgia Villa. Maggio was selected to represent Italy at the 2016 European Championships. While there she helped Italy place fourth in the team competition. Individually Maggio won gold on vault ahead of compatriot Martina Basile and Denisa Golgotă of Romania.

== Senior gymnastics career ==
=== 2017 ===
Maggio turned senior in 2017. She made her debut at the 2017 City of Jesolo Trophy where she placed twenty-fourth. She next competed in the 2nd Italian Serie A where she placed first. She was later selected to represent Italy at the European Championships. While there she qualified to the All-Around final where she finished in sixth place. She competed at the next Italian Serie A competition and once again finished in first place. Maggio continued her dominance, winning the Italian Gold Championships and placing first on three of the four apparatuses. Maggio was poised to compete at the World Championships, however she sustained a knee injury while training that ended her season prematurely.

=== 2018 ===
Maggio returned to competition in June, competing at the 3rd Italian Serie A where she finished 8th in the all-around. The following month she competed at the Italian National Championships where she placed fourth in the all-around, won gold on balance beam, and placed fifth and sixth on uneven bars and floor exercise respectively. Later that month Maggio re-injured her knee and would be unable to compete at the European Championships nor the World Championships.

=== 2019 ===
Maggio returned to competition at the 2019 City of Jesolo Trophy. She placed 17th in the all-around and fifth on balance beam. She competed at the Italian National Championships where she won silver on balance beam behind Giorgia Villa. She placed sixth in the all-around and on uneven bars and floor exercise. On September 4 Maggio was named as the alternate for the team to compete at the 2019 World Championships in Stuttgart, Germany.

At the team final Italy won the bronze medal – Italy's first team medal since the 1950 World Artistic Gymnastics Championships. As the alternate, Maggio was also awarded the medal.

=== 2020–21 ===
Maggio competed at various Serie A competitions in the beginning of 2020; however most competitions were canceled or postponed due to the worldwide COVID-19 pandemic. In November Maggio competed at the Italian National Championships. She finished third in the all-around behind Giorgia Villa and Asia D'Amato. During event finals she won gold on balance beam, silver on uneven bars behind Villa, and placed sixth on floor exercise.

Maggio competed at the 1st Italian Serie A of 2021 where she placed first. In April Maggio was selected to represent Italy at the European Championships in Basel alongside Alice D'Amato, Giorgia Villa, and Vanessa Ferrari. Maggio qualified to the all-around, balance beam, and floor exercise event finals. During the all-around final Maggio finished in sixth place. During the apparatus event finals Maggio finished fifth on balance beam and fourth on floor exercise.

Maggio was named to the team to represent Italy at the 2020 Summer Olympics alongside Alice and Asia D'Amato and Giorgia Villa (later replaced by Vanessa Ferrari). The team qualified for the team finals and placed fourth with a total score of 163.638.

=== 2022 ===
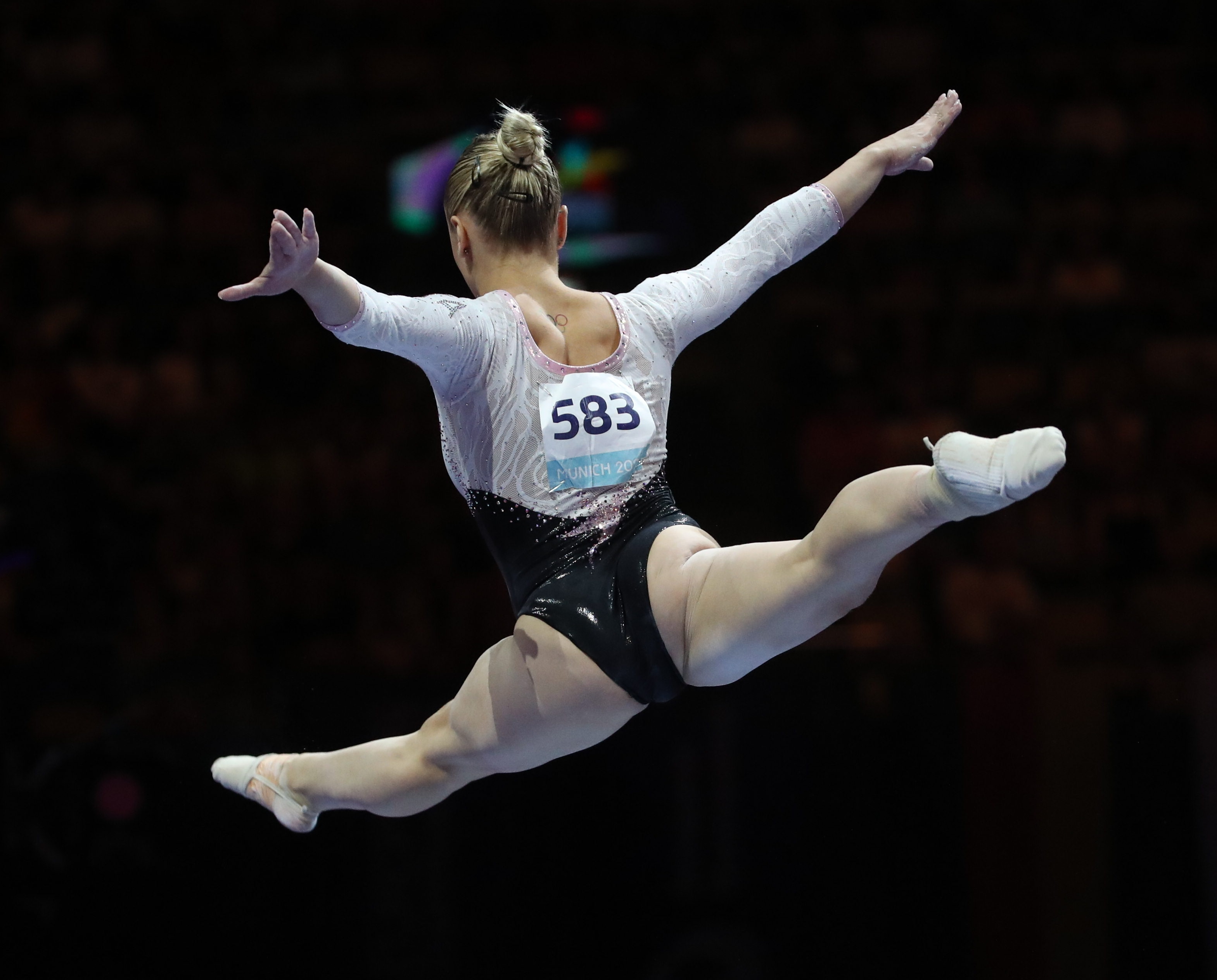
Maggio at the 2022 European Championships

Maggio competed at the DTB Pokal Team Challenge. Her scores on vault, balance beam, and floor exercise contributed towards Italy's second-place finish. Individually she won silver on balance beam behind Konnor McClain. Maggio next competed at the City of Jesolo Trophy. She helped Italy finish second as a team and individually placed third in the all-around behind McClain and Asia D'Amato. During event finals she once again finished second on balance beam behind McClain. In June Maggio competed at the Mediterranean Games alongside Angela Andreoli, Alice D'Amato, Asia D'Amato, and Giorgia Villa. Together they won gold in the team competition, over five points ahead of second place France. Individually Maggio won gold in the all-around.

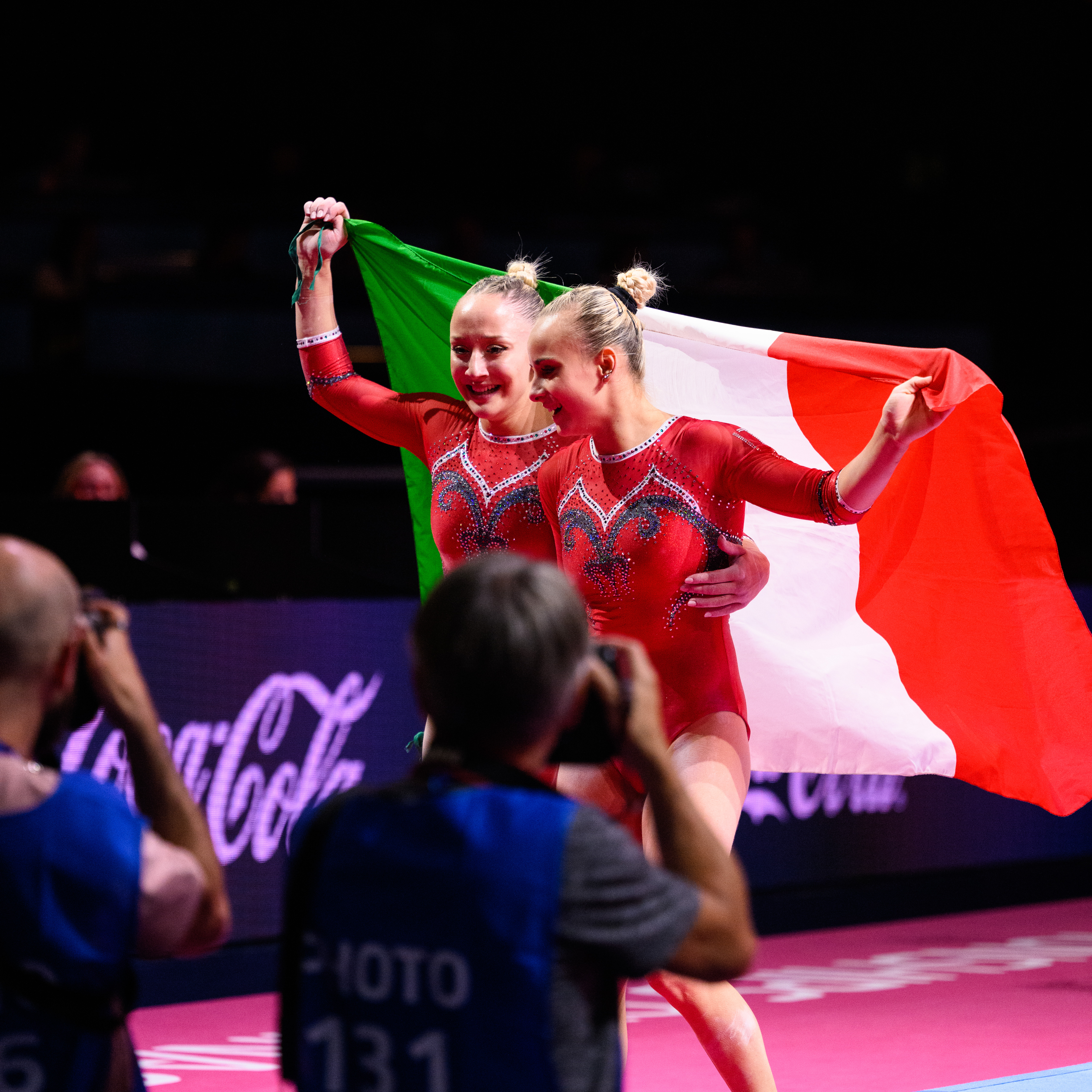
Maggio (left) and Asia D'Amato at the 2022 European Championships

Maggio next competed at the European Championships. On the first day of competition she won bronze in the all-around behind compatriot Asia D'Amato and Alice Kinsella of Great Britain. Additionally Maggio helped Italy qualify to the team final in first place and individually she qualified to the floor exercise final. During the team final Maggio contributed scores on vault, balance beam, and floor exercise towards Italy's first place finish. After teammate Asia D'Amato was injured during the vault final, Maggio was substituted into the balance beam final where she finished fourth. During the floor exercise final Maggio finished second behind reigning European floor exercise champion Jessica Gadirova.

In October Maggio competed at the Italian National Championships. She placed first in the all-around, on uneven bars (tied with Villa), on balance beam, and on floor exercise. She was later named to the team to compete at the World Championships in Liverpool alongside Giorgia Villa, Alice D'Amato, Manila Esposito, Veronica Mandriota, and alternate Elisa Iorio. While there she helped Italy finish fifth as a team. Individually Maggio qualified to the all-around final and was a reserve athlete for the uneven bars and floor exercise finals. She finished ninth in the all-around and was able to compete in the floor exercise final after teammate D'Amato withdrew; she finished sixth. Maggio next competed at the Swiss Cup alongside Nicola Bartolini. While there they finished second behind the American duo of Addison Fatta and Yul Moldauer.

=== 2023–2024 ===
In early 2023 Maggio competed at the Cottbus World Cup where she finished fifth on the balance beam. In the summer Maggio underwent surgery on her foot and missed the 2023 World Championships.

Maggio returned to competition 2024 Doha World Cup but she failed to make any event finals. She competed at the Italian National Championships where she placed fifth in the all-around. She was selected as an alternate for the 2024 Olympic Games.

== Competitive history ==
Competitive history of Martina Maggio
Year	Event	Team	AA	VT	UB	BB	FX
2014	Golden League		16			6	
2014	Camaiore Trophy	1st place, gold medalist(s)					
2014	Iuvenila Cup	1st place, gold medalist(s)	1st place, gold medalist(s)	1st place, gold medalist(s)	1st place, gold medalist(s)	1st place, gold medalist(s)	3rd place, bronze medalist(s)
2015	European Youth Olympic Festival	5	13			4	8
2015	Elite Gym Massilia	5	17				
2016	City of Jesolo Trophy		7	2nd place, silver medalist(s)		2nd place, silver medalist(s)	3rd place, bronze medalist(s)
2016	Italian Junior Friendly	3rd place, bronze medalist(s)	3rd place, bronze medalist(s)				
2016	Junior European Championships	4		1st place, gold medalist(s)			
2017	City of Jesolo Trophy	5	24				
2017	European Championships		6				
2017	Italian Gold Championships		1st place, gold medalist(s)	1st place, gold medalist(s)	1st place, gold medalist(s)	1st place, gold medalist(s)	3rd place, bronze medalist(s)
2018	National Championships		4		5	1st place, gold medalist(s)	6
2019	City of Jesolo Trophy		17			5	
2019	National Championships		6		6	2nd place, silver medalist(s)	6
2019	World Championships	(bronze) (Note: Maggio was the Team ITA alternate.)					
2020	National Championships		3rd place, bronze medalist(s)		2nd place, silver medalist(s)	1st place, gold medalist(s)	6
2021
2021	European Championships		6			5	4
2021	National Championships		3rd place, bronze medalist(s)		2nd place, silver medalist(s)	1st place, gold medalist(s)	
2021	Olympic Games	4	19				
2022	DTB Pokal Team Challenge	2nd place, silver medalist(s)				2nd place, silver medalist(s)	
2022	City of Jesolo Trophy	2nd place, silver medalist(s)	3rd place, bronze medalist(s)			2nd place, silver medalist(s)	
2022	Mediterranean Games	1st place, gold medalist(s)	1st place, gold medalist(s)		2nd place, silver medalist(s)	1st place, gold medalist(s)	2nd place, silver medalist(s)
2022	European Championships	1st place, gold medalist(s)	3rd place, bronze medalist(s)			4	2nd place, silver medalist(s)
2022	National Championships		1st place, gold medalist(s)		1st place, gold medalist(s)	1st place, gold medalist(s)	1st place, gold medalist(s)
2022	World Championships	5	9		R3		6
2022	Swiss Cup	2nd place, silver medalist(s)					
2023	Cottbus World Cup					5	
2023	City of Jesolo Trophy	1st place, gold medalist(s)					
2024	Italian Championships		5				
2026	City of Jesolo Trophy	5					
