= Caterina Cereghetti =

Swiss artistic gymnast

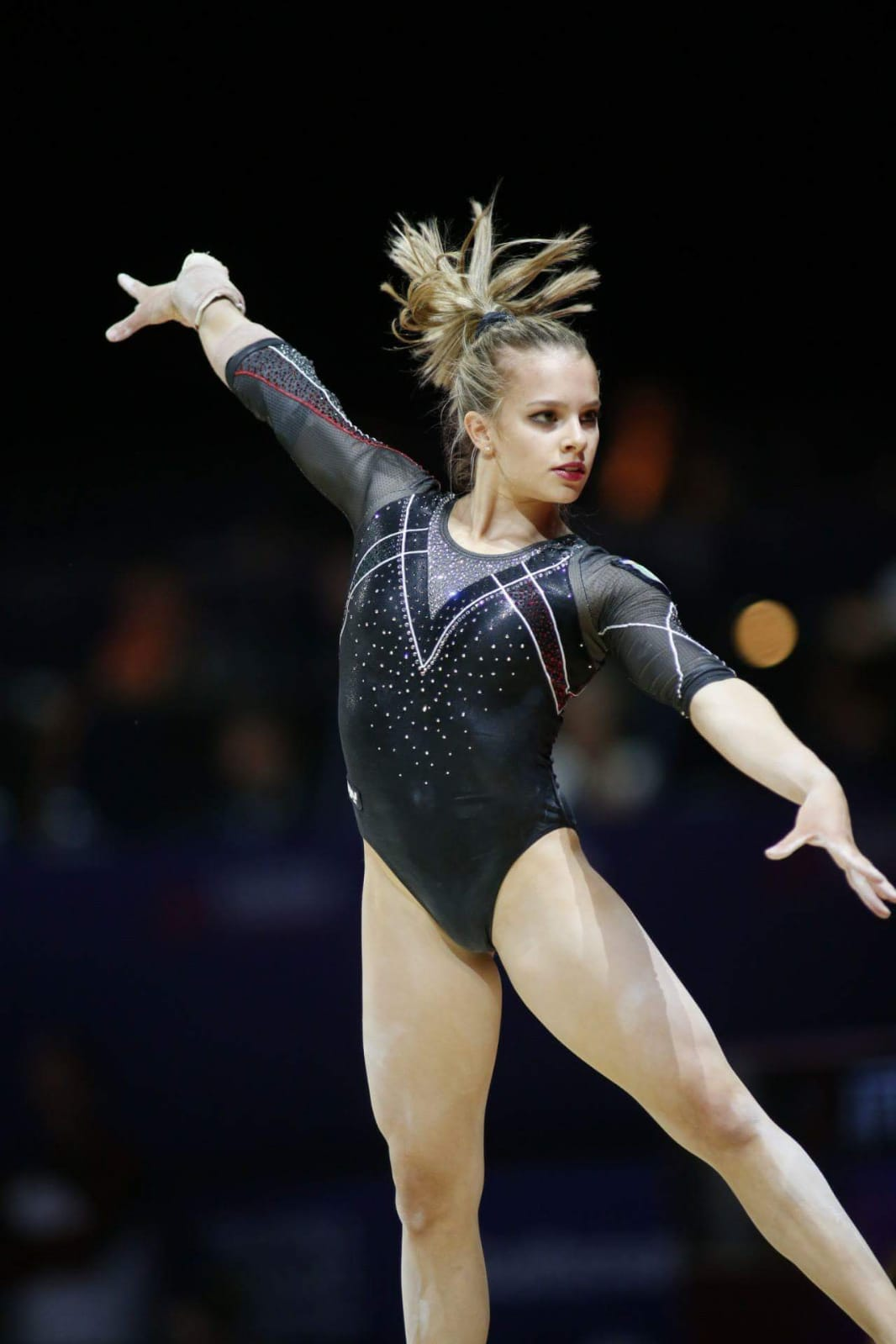
- Cereghetti at the 2018 European Championships

Personal information
- Full name: Caterina Teresa Anna Maria Cereghetti
- Born: 31 August 2001 (age 25) Bellinzona, Switzerland

Gymnastics career
- Discipline: Women's artistic gymnastics
- Country represented: Switzerland
- Former countries represented: Italy
- Training location: Milan, Italy
- Club: SFG Bellinzona
Medal record
Representing Italy
Women's artistic gymnastics
Mediterranean Games
Gold medal – first place	2018 Tarragona	Team

Caterina Teresa Anna Maria Cereghetti (born 31 August 2001) is a Swiss artistic gymnast who previously represented Italy internationally. She won a gold medal with the Italian team at the 2018 Mediterranean Games.

== Early gymnastics career ==
Cereghetti began gymnastics in Switzerland and represented her native country at the espoir level. At the 2014 Tournoi International, she won a gold medal on the floor exercise and silver medals on the uneven bars and in the all-around. In 2015, her Italian coach Monia Marazzi relocated to Milan, and Cereghetti chose to follow her coach and began representing Italy in international competitions. She is a dual-citizen of Italy and Switzerland. She competed for Italy at the 2015 FIT Challenge in a mixed team event alongside Brazilian gymnasts, and they won the bronze medal. She competed alongside Francesca Linari and Martina Maggio at the 2015 European Youth Olympic Festival, and they finished fifth in the team competition. Cereghetti qualified for the all-around final, finishing 11th.

Cereghetti missed most of the 2016 season due to an injury. She only competed on the balance beam at the 2016 Italian Championships, finishing sixth.

== Senior gymnastics career ==
=== 2017 ===
Cereghetti became age-eligible for senior international competitions in 2017. She made her senior international debut at the 2017 City of Jesolo Trophy and finished seventh with the mixed Italian and Belgian team. At the Italian Gold Championships, she tied with Martina Maggio for the balance beam gold medal and placed fifth in the all-around. She then won a gold medal with the Italian team at the FIT Challenge. She placed 13th in the all-around at the 2017 Italian Championships.

=== 2018 ===
Cereghetti competed at the 2018 City of Jesolo Trophy and finished 32nd in the all-around after several errors on the floor exercise. She was initially Italy's alternate for the 2018 Mediterranean Games but was added to the team after Desiree Carofiglio withdrew due to a knee injury. She helped the team win the gold medal. She then placed ninth in the all-around at the Italian Championships.

Cereghetti was selected to compete at the 2018 European Championships in Glasgow. The Italian team initially finished ninth in the qualification round and did not qualify for the final, but they were able to compete after the Belgian team withdrew. In the team final, she fell off the uneven bars but performed well on the vault and floor exercise to help Italy finish sixth. Later that year, she helped Italy finish second to Germany at the Rüsselsheim Friendly. She was selected to represent Italy at the 2018 World Championships in Doha. However, she fell off the uneven bars during training and injured her left elbow, causing her to withdraw from the competition. She returned to Italy and had surgery on her elbow.

=== 2019–2022 ===
Cereghetti missed most of the 2019 season due to her injury. At the 2020 Italian Championships, she finished 14th in the all-around and fifth on the balance beam. She also finished 14th in the all-around at the 2021 Italian Championships. She improved her results to seventh in the all-around at the 2022 Italian Championships. There, she also qualified for the balance beam and floor exercise finals, finishing seventh and fifth, respectively. She won the gold medal in the all-around at the 2022 Italian Gold Championships and also won the gold medals on the balance beam and floor exercise.

=== 2023 ===
In 2023, Cereghetti requested to represent her native Switzerland internationally and was released by the Italian Gymnastics Federation. The nationality change was then approved by the International Gymnastics Federation. She competed for Switzerland at the Magglingen Friendly, finishing second in the all-around to teammate Lena Bickel. She was then chosen to compete at the 2023 European Championships. She contributed on all four events toward the Swiss team's 17th-place finish. Although Switzerland did not qualify for the 2023 World Championships as a team, Cereghetti and Bickel qualified as individuals. Cereghetti withdrew from the Swiss Championships in the middle of the competition. She then had to withdraw from the World Championships due to a foot injury.

== Competitive history ==
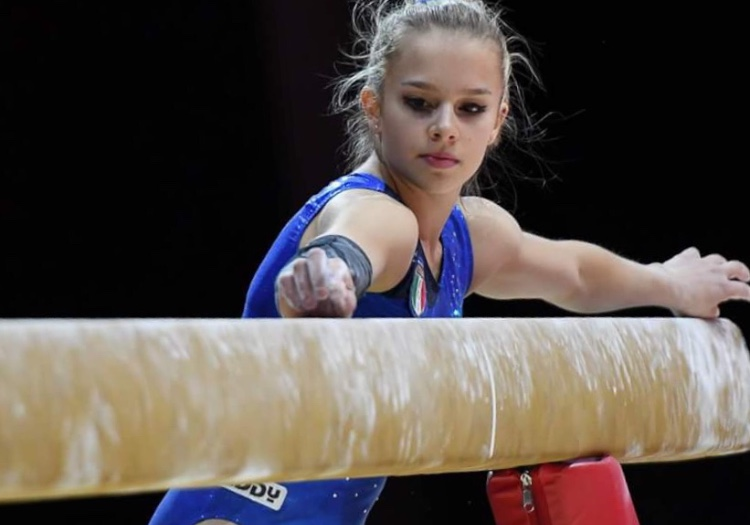
Cereghetti at the 2018 European Championships

Competitive history of Caterina Cereghetti for Italy
Year	Event	Team	AA	VT	UB	BB	FX
2015	FIT Challenge	3rd place, bronze medalist(s)	16				
2015	European Youth Olympic Festival	5	11				
2016	Italian Championships					6	
2017	City of Jesolo Trophy	7	29				
2017	Italian Gold Championships		5	6	6	1st place, gold medalist(s)	
2017	FIT Challenge	1st place, gold medalist(s)	11				
2017	Italian Championships		13				
2018	City of Jesolo Trophy		32				
2018	Mediterranean Games	1st place, gold medalist(s)					
2018	Italian Championships		9				
2018	European Championships	6					
2018	Rüsselsheim Friendly	2nd place, silver medalist(s)	16				
2020	Italian Championships		14			5	
2021	Italian Championships		14				
2022	Italian Championships		7			7	5
2022	Italian Gold Championships		1st place, gold medalist(s)	2nd place, silver medalist(s)	2nd place, silver medalist(s)	1st place, gold medalist(s)	1st place, gold medalist(s)

Competitive history of Caterina Cereghetti for Switzerland
Year	Event	Team	AA	VT	UB	BB	FX
2014	Tournoi International	1st place, gold medalist(s)	2nd place, silver medalist(s)		2nd place, silver medalist(s)	4	1st place, gold medalist(s)
2023	Magglingen Friendly		2nd place, silver medalist(s)			1st place, gold medalist(s)	
2023	European Championships	17					
2023	Swiss Championships		DNF				
