= 18th Tournoi International =

2014 gymnastics competition in France

18th Tournoi International was a gymnastics competition held in Combs la Ville, France on November 8–9, 2014.

== Medal winners ==
- Junior

Event	Gold	Silver	Bronze
Team	Russia	Switzerland	France
All-around	Natalia Kapitonova (RUS)	Daria Mikhailova (RUS)	Gaia Nesurini (SUI)
Vault	Coline Devillard (FRA)	Daria Mikhailova (RUS)	Laurie Denommee (CAN)
Uneven Bars	Natalia Kapitonova (RUS)	Tisha Volleman (NED)	Amara Cipollina (FRA)
Balance Beam	Coline Devillard (FRA)	Gaia Nesurini (SUI)	Daria Mikhailova (RUS)
Floor Exercise	Daria Mikhailova (RUS)	Tisha Volleman (NED)	Natalia Kapitonova (RUS)

- Espoir

Event	Gold	Silver	Bronze
TF	Switzerland	France - 1	France
AA	Livia Schmid (SUI)	Caterina Cereghetti (SUI)	Melissa Poitreau (FRA)
VT	Elizaveta Kochetkova (RUS)	Csenge Molnar (HUN)	Sophie Marois (CAN)
UB	Elizaveta Kochetkova (RUS)	Caterina Cereghetti (SUI)	Morgane Osyssek (FRA)
BB	Melissa Poitreau (FRA)	Alisson Lapp (FRA)	Maeva Chenaye (FRA)
FX	Caterina Cereghetti (SUI)	Elizaveta Kochetkova (RUS)	Anina Wildi (SUI)

== Result ==
=== Junior All-Around ===
Position	Gymnast	Vault (gymnastics)	Uneven bars	Balance beam	Floor (gymnastics)	Total
1st place, gold medalist(s)	Natalia Kapitonova (RUS)	13.150	14.450	12.100	13.000	52.700
2nd place, silver medalist(s)	Daria Mikhailova (RUS)	13.900	11.450	13.050	13.650	52.050
3rd place, bronze medalist(s)	Gaia Nesurini (SUI)	13.800	12.700	12.450	11.900	50.850

=== Junior Vault ===
Rank	Gymnast	D Score	E Score	Pen.	Score 1	D Score	E Score	Pen.	Score 2	Total
1st place, gold medalist(s)	Coline Devillard (FRA)	4.4	9.267		13.667	4.6	9.300		13.900	13.783
2nd place, silver medalist(s)	Daria Mikhailova (RUS)	5.0	9.033		14.033	4.6	8.667		13.267	13.650
3rd place, bronze medalist(s)	Laurie Denommee (CAN)	5.0	8.833		13.833	5.0	8.533	0.3	13.233	13.533
Rank	Gymnast	Vault 1				Vault 2				Total

=== Junior Uneven Bars ===
Rank	Gymnast	D Score	E Score	Pen.	Total
1st place, gold medalist(s)	Natalia Kapitonova (RUS)	6.1	7.200		13.300
2nd place, silver medalist(s)	Tisha Volleman (NED)	4.9	8.167		13.067
3rd place, bronze medalist(s)	Amara Cipollina (FRA)	4.8	7.700		12.500

=== Junior Balance Beam ===
Rank	Gymnast	D Score	E Score	Pen.	Total
1st place, gold medalist(s)	Coline Devillard (FRA)	5.5	7.767		13.267
2nd place, silver medalist(s)	Gaia Nesurini (SUI)	4.6	8.533		13.133
3rd place, bronze medalist(s)	Daria Mikhailova (RUS)	5.9	7.200		13.100

=== Junior Floor Exercise ===
Rank	Gymnast	D Score	E Score	Pen.	Total
1st place, gold medalist(s)	Daria Mikhailova (RUS)	5.3	8.333		13.633
2nd place, silver medalist(s)	Tisha Volleman (NED)	5.0	8.167		13.167
3rd place, bronze medalist(s)	Natalia Kapitonova (RUS)	5.1	8.067		13.167

=== Espoir All-Around ===
Position	Gymnast	Vault (gymnastics)	Uneven bars	Balance beam	Floor (gymnastics)	Total
1st place, gold medalist(s)	Livia Schmid (SUI)	14.550	12.750	13.700	12.550	53.550
2nd place, silver medalist(s)	Caterina Cereghetti (SUI)	14.150	12.600	13.650	13.050	53.450
3rd place, bronze medalist(s)	Melissa Poitreau (FRA)	14.150	11.950	14.100	13.000	53.200
4	Anina Wildi (SUI)	14.200	12.550	12.500	13.200	52.450
5	Elizaveta Kochetkova (RUS)	13.850	13.250	12.400	12.900	52.400
18	Anastasia Fadeeva (RUS)	12.250	11.000	12.000	12.100	47.350
24	Elnara Ablyazova (RUS)	12.950	9.050	11.350	13.200	46.550
41	Elizaveta Arefyeva (RUS)	11.400	7.900	10.950	10.950	41.200

=== Espoir Vault ===
Rank	Gymnast	D Score	E Score	Pen.	Score 1	D Score	E Score	Pen.	Score 2	Total
1st place, gold medalist(s)	Elizaveta Kochetkova (RUS)	5.0	9.067		14.067	4.4	9.233		13.633	13.850
Rank	Gymnast	Vault 1				Vault 2				Total

=== Espoir Uneven Bars ===
Rank	Gymnast	D Score	E Score	Pen.	Total
1st place, gold medalist(s)	Elizaveta Kochetkova (RUS)	5.1	6.867		11.967
2nd place, silver medalist(s)	Caterina Cereghetti (SUI)	4.9	6.933		11.833
3rd place, bronze medalist(s)	Morgane Osyssek (FRA)	4.2	7.500		11.700

=== Espoir Balance Beam ===
Rank	Gymnast	D Score	E Score	Pen.	Total
1st place, gold medalist(s)	Melissa Poitreau (FRA)	6.0	7.833		13.833
2nd place, silver medalist(s)	Alisson Lapp (FRA)	5.3	8.233		13.533
3rd place, bronze medalist(s)	Maeva Chenaye (FRA)	5.9	7.400		13.300

=== Espoir Floor Exercise ===
Rank	Gymnast	D Score	E Score	Pen.	Total
1st place, gold medalist(s)	Caterina Cereghetti (SUI)	5.1	8.033		13.133
2nd place, silver medalist(s)	Elizaveta Kochetkova (RUS)	5.0	8.100		13.100
3rd place, bronze medalist(s)	Anina Wildi (SUI)	4.9	8.133	0.1	12.933
4	Sophie Marois (CAN)	4.8	7.633		12.433
5	Elnara Ablyazova (RUS)	4.9	7.300	0.3	11.900
