= Marine Boyer =

French artistic gymnast

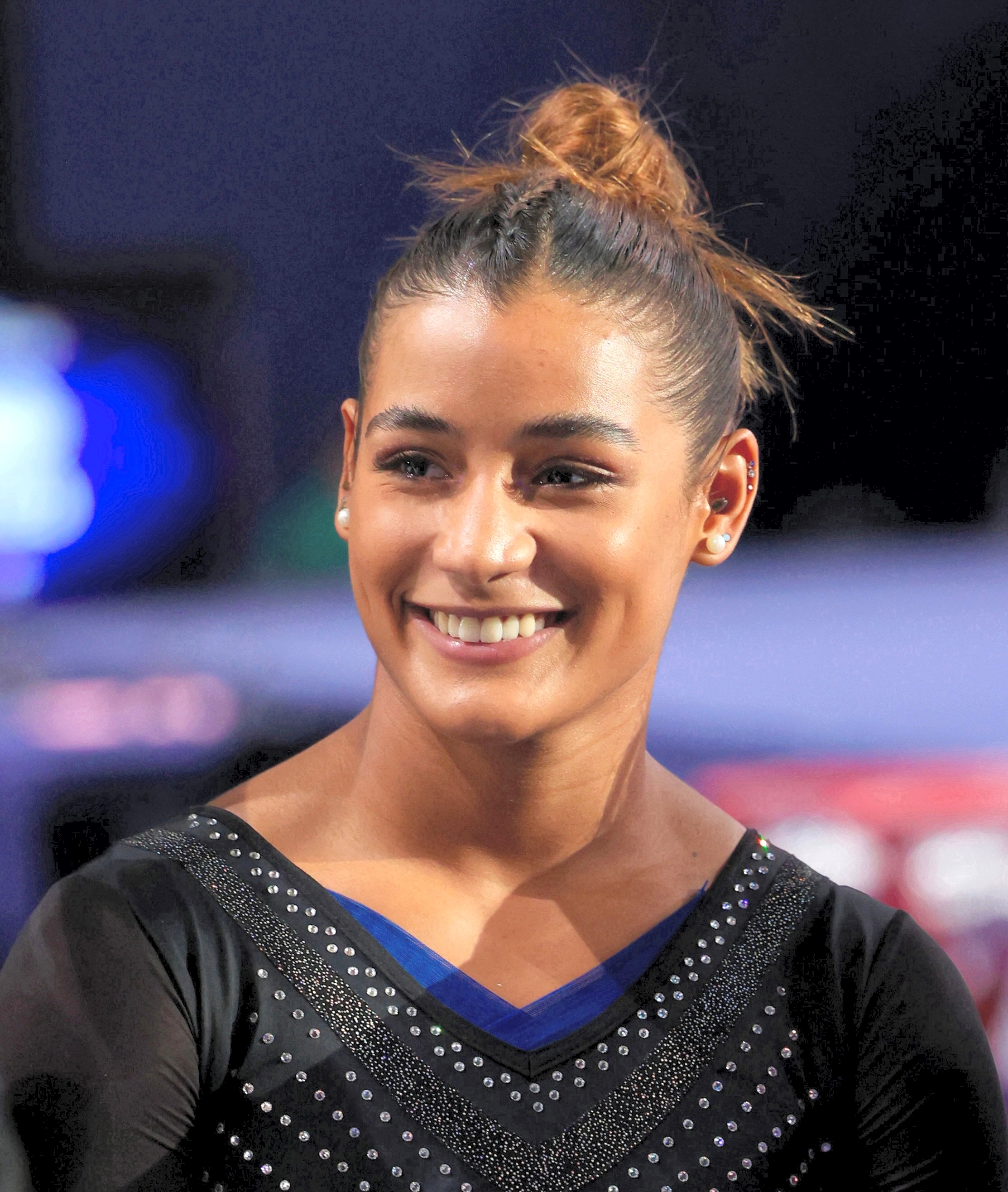
- Boyer in 2023

Personal information
- Full name: Marine Clémence Boyer
- Born: 22 May 2000 (age 26) Saint-Benoît, Réunion, France
- Height: 1.62 m (5 ft 4 in)

Gymnastics career
- Discipline: Women's artistic gymnastics
- Country represented: France; (2013–2024)
- Club: Meaux Gymnastics
- Gym: INSEP
- Head coaches: Martine Georges, Alisée Dal Santo
- Assistant coaches: Jérome Martin, Tara Duncanson
- Former coaches: Hong Ma, Jian Fu, Cédric Guille
- Choreographer: Grégory Milan
Medal record
Women's artistic gymnastics
Representing France
World Championships
| Bronze medal – third place | 2023 Antwerp | Team |
European Championships
| Silver medal – second place | 2016 Bern | Balance Beam |
| Silver medal – second place | 2018 Glasgow | Team |
| Bronze medal – third place | 2016 Bern | Team |
| Bronze medal – third place | 2018 Glasgow | Balance Beam |
| Bronze medal – third place | 2024 Rimini | Team |
| Bronze medal – third place | 2024 Rimini | Balance Beam |
Mediterranean Games
| Gold medal – first place | 2018 Tarragona | Balance Beam |
| Silver medal – second place | 2018 Tarragona | Team |
FIG World Cup
| Event | 1st | 2nd | 3rd |
|---|---|---|---|
| World Cup | 1 | 3 | 1 |
| World Challenge Cup | 2 | 4 | 0 |
| Total | 3 | 7 | 1 |

Marine Clémence Boyer (French: [bwa.je]; born 22 May 2000) is a French female artistic gymnast. She was a member of the bronze medal-winning team at the 2023 World Championships and was also a part of the 2018 and 2024 Europeans and 2018 Mediterranean Games silver medal winning teams and the 2016 European bronze medal winning team. Individually she is the 2018 Mediterranean Games gold medalist, the 2016 European silver medalist, the 2018 European bronze medalist and the 2024 European bronze medalist on the balance beam. She represented France at the 2016, 2020 and 2024 Summer Olympics. She is the 2016 French all-around champion and an eleven-time medalist at the FIG World Cup series.

== Early life ==
Boyer was born on 22 May 2000 in Saint-Benoît, Réunion on the French island of Réunion to parents Alain and Rolande Boyer but grew up in Melun in metropolitan France. She began gymnastics at a club in Melun when she was five years old. In 2011, she began training at the Meaux Gymnastics club.

== Junior gymnastics career ==
=== Espoir ===
Boyer won the silver medal in the all-around behind Loan His at the 2012 French Championships in the Espoir division. She made her international debut at the 2013 International Gymnix in Montreal where she placed sixteenth in the all-around and eighth in the floor exercise final in the Challenge division.

=== Junior ===
Boyer won the silver medals with the Meaux club in the team competition and in the all-around behind Loan His at the 2014 French Championships. She competed with the French team at a friendly meet against Romania and Belgium, and they finished third. Individually, Boyer finished seventh in the all-around. Then at the 2014 European Championships, the French team finished seventh, and Boyer finished thirteenth in the all-around final. At the Top Gym Tournament, Boyer tied for fifth place in the all-around with Canadian Sydney Soloski. In the event finals, she won the silver medal on the vault behind Angelina Melnikova and the gold medal on the balance beam.

At the 2015 French Championships, Boyer won the gold medal on the balance beam and the silver medal on the uneven bars behind Louise Vanhille. Then at the FIT Challenge in Ghent, she helped France win the team silver medal behind Germany, and she placed sixth in the all-around. She then competed with Juliette Bossu and Mélanie de Jesus dos Santos at the European Youth Olympic Festival in Tbilisi where they placed sixth in the team competition. Boyer qualified for the all-around final where she placed ninth, and she won the gold medal on the vault with a score of 14.275. She won a team gold medal at the Elite Gym Massilia and also placed seventh in the all-around and fourth on vault.

== Senior gymnastics career ==
=== 2016 ===
Boyer became age-eligible for senior competition in 2016. She made her senior international debut at the City of Jesolo Trophy and finished fourth on the balance beam with a score of 14.700, only 0.050 points behind bronze-medalist Aly Raisman. She was then selected to compete at the Olympic Test Event alongside Marine Brevet, Loan His, Anne Kuhm, Oréane Lechenault, Louise Vanhille. The team finished fourth and qualified for a team spot for the Olympic Games. She won her first World Cup title on the balance beam at the Varna World Challenge Cup. At the European Championships, she competed alongside Marine Brevet, Loan His, Oréane Lechenault, and Alison Lepin, and they won the bronze medal which was France's first European team medal since 2008. Boyer won the silver medal on the balance beam with a score of 14.600, behind Aliya Mustafina and ahead of Catalina Ponor. Then at the French Championships, she won the gold medal in the all-around and the balance beam and placed sixth on the uneven bars.

Boyer was selected to represent France at the 2016 Summer Olympics alongside Marine Brevet, Loan His, Oréane Lechenault, and Louise Vanhille. Boyer said prior to the Olympics that her goal was to qualify for a final. During the qualification round, the French team finished eleventh, and Boyer qualified for the balance beam final in seventh place with a score of 14.600. In the balance beam final, she finished fourth with a score of 14.600, only 0.133 points behind bronze medalist Simone Biles.

=== 2017 ===
At the City of Jesolo Trophy, Boyer finished twelfth in the all-around and tied with Flávia Saraiva for the silver medal on the balance beam behind Riley McCusker. She then competed at the European Championships and finished sixteenth in the all-around and seventh on the balance beam. Then at the French Championships, she won the silver medal in the all-around behind Mélanie de Jesus dos Santos and the gold medals on the balance beam and the floor exercise. She won the silver medal on the balance beam at the Paris Challenge Cup behind Romanian Larisa Iordache. At the World Championships, she finished twenty-first in the all-around final. She then won the silver medal in the all-around at the Arthur Gander Memorial behind Hitomi Hatakeda. At the Swiss Cup, she competed on a mixed team with Marian Drăgulescu, and they placed eighth. Then at the Toyota International, she finished sixth on the balance beam and seventh on the floor exercise.

=== 2018 ===
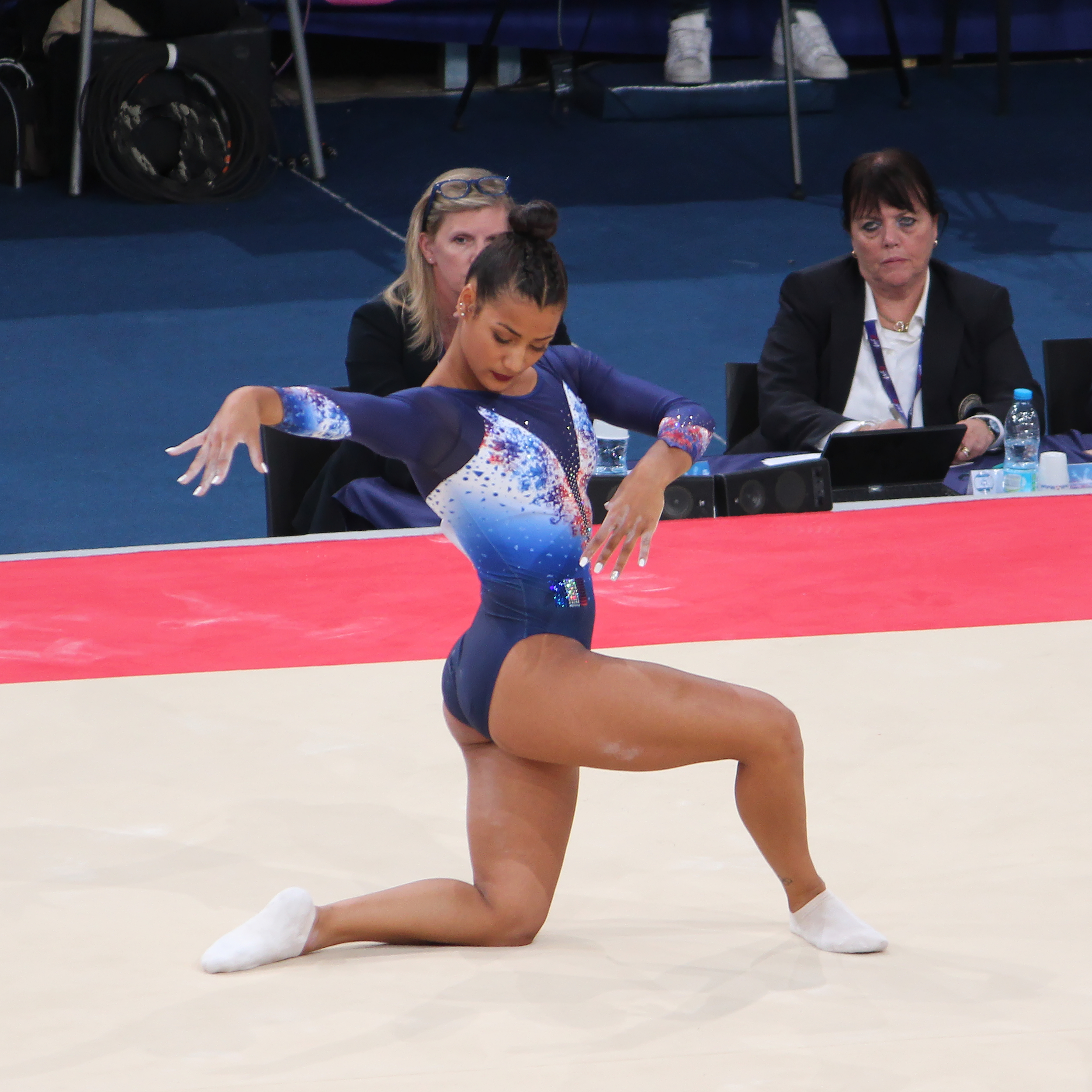
Boyer on the floor exercise at the 2018 Paris Challenge Cup

Boyer won the silver medal on the balance beam behind teammate Mélanie de Jesus dos Santos at the Doha World Cup. Then at the French Championships, she finished fourth in the all-around and on the floor exercise. She was selected to represent France at the 2018 Mediterranean Games in Tarragona, and the French team won the silver medal behind Italy. Boyer won the gold medal on the balance beam with a score of 14.033. At the Sainté Gym Cup, France won the team gold medal against Germany and Switzerland, and Boyer placed seventh in the all-around.

In August, Boyer competed in the European Championships in Glasgow alongside Juliette Bossu, Lorette Charpy, Mélanie de Jesus dos Santos, Coline Devillard, and they finished first in the qualification round. Ultimately, the French team won the silver medal in the final behind Russia and ahead of the Netherlands. Individually, Boyer qualified for the beam final in fifth place. In the final, she won the bronze medal behind Sanne Wevers and Nina Derwael. Then at the 2018 Paris Challenge Cup, she won the silver medal on the balance beam behind Canadian Ellie Black.

Boyer was selected to compete at the World Championships alongside Juliette Bossu, Lorette Charpy, Mélanie de Jesus dos Santos, and Louise Vanhille. The team qualified into the team final which was their first major international team finals since the 2008 Olympic Games, but Boyer narrowly missed qualifying to the beam final and was the first reserve. The French team ultimately finished fifth in the team final which was their best finish at the World Artistic Gymnastics Championships since 1997. After the World Championships, Boyer competed at the Cottbus World Cup and finished sixth on the balance beam.

=== 2019 ===
At the Baku World Cup, Boyer won the silver medal on the balance beam after losing the execution-score tiebreaker to Australian Emma Nedov. She then won the bronze medal on the balance beam at the Doha World Cup. She qualified for the floor exercise event final at the European Championships and finished eighth.

Boyer competed at the Worms Friendly where the French team finished third behind Germany and Belgium. She then won the silver medal on the floor exercise at the Paris Challenge Cup behind Ukrainian Diana Varinska. Boyer was then named to the team to compete at the World Championships in Stuttgart alongside Lorette Charpy, Mélanie de Jesus dos Santos, Coline Devillard, and Aline Friess. They finished fifth and qualified France for a team spot at the 2020 Olympic Games.

=== 2020–2021 ===
Boyer was initially scheduled to compete at the 2020 Birmingham World Cup. However, the event was postponed and eventually cancelled due to the COVID-19 pandemic in the United Kingdom. She did not compete in any major international competitions in 2020.

At the 2021 European Championships, Boyer qualified for the all-around final, but she withdrew in order to focus on the balance beam final and because of an ankle injury. She finished sixth in the beam final with a score of 12.866. Then at the Varna Challenge Cup, she won the silver medal on the balance beam behind Anastasiia Bachynska. Then at the French Championships, she won the silver medal in the all-around behind Carolann Héduit. She was then selected to represent France at the 2020 Summer Olympics alongside Héduit, Mélanie de Jesus dos Santos, and Aline Friess. Prior to the Olympic Games, she competed at the FIT Challenge and helped the French team win the gold medal. At the Olympic Games, she helped France qualify for the team final where they finished sixth.

=== 2022 ===
In August, Boyer competed at the European Championships in Munich, where France finished sixth in the team final. Individually, she was the third reserve for the balance beam final. In September she competed at the Paris World Challenge Cup where she won gold on the balance beam ahead of American Jade Carey. In October Boyer was named to the team to compete at the World Championships in Liverpool alongside Mélanie de Jesus dos Santos, Coline Devillard, Aline Friess, and Carolann Héduit.

=== 2023 ===
In June, Marine Boyer competed at the Tel Aviv Challenge Cup where she got gold on balance beam.

In September, Boyer won her second consecutive gold medal on balance beam at the Paris World Challenge Cup.

Boyer was named to the team to compete at the World Championships alongside Lorette Charpy, Mélanie de Jesus dos Santos, Coline Devillard, and Morgane Osyssek. While there Boyer contributed scores on all four apparatuses towards France's surprise bronze medal win – France's first team medal since 1950.

=== 2024 ===
In May, Boyer competed at the European Championships alongside Ming van Eijken, Lorette Charpy, Coline Devillard, and Morgane Osyssek. During event finals, Boyer won bronze on balance beam behind Manila Esposito and Sabrina Voinea. During the team final, she helped France win the bronze medal behind Italy and Great Britain.

In July, Boyer was officially selected to represent France at the 2024 Summer Olympics alongside Mélanie de Jesus dos Santos, Devillard, Osyssek, and van Eijken. They finished eleventh in qualifications and did not advance to the team final.

== Competitive history ==
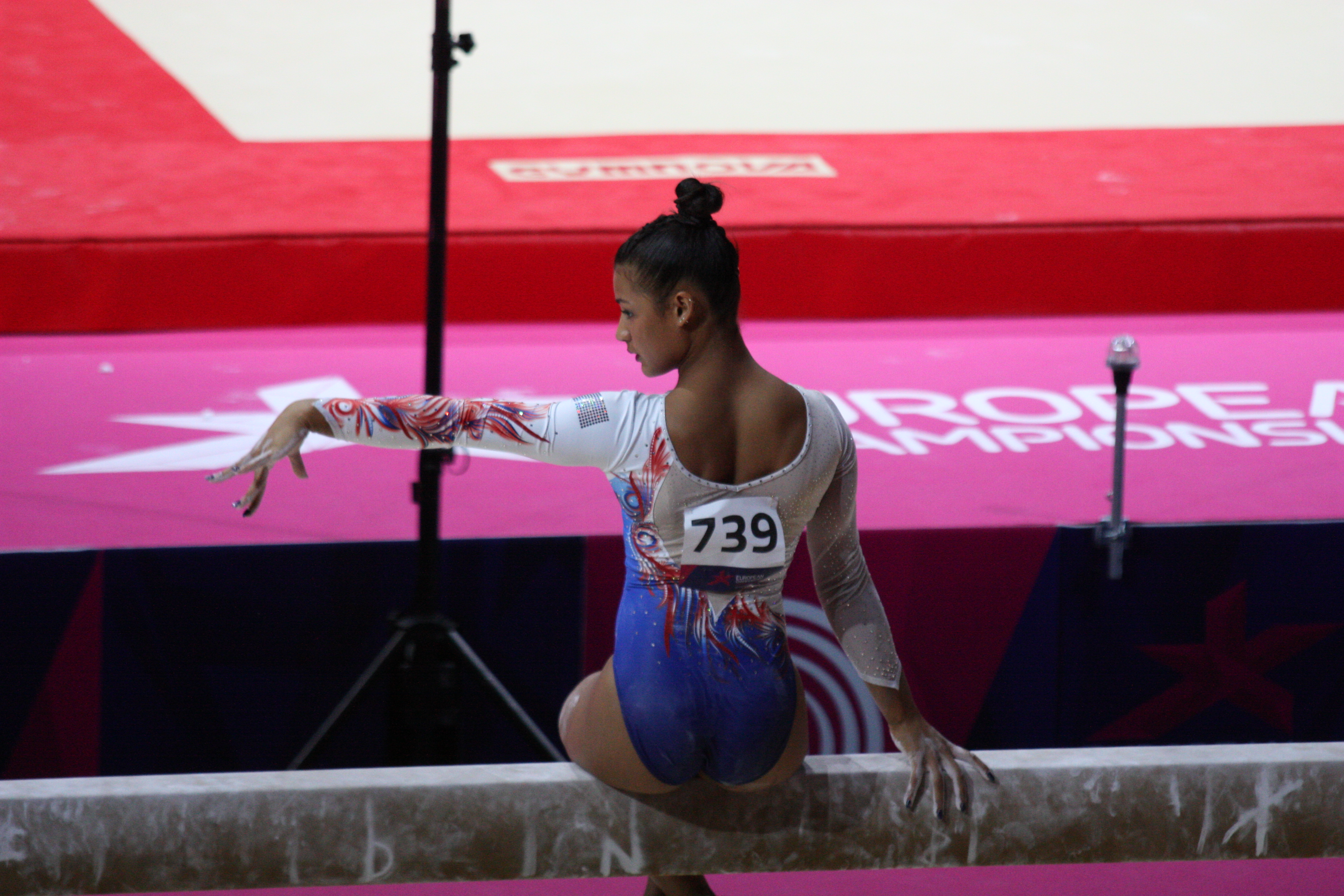
Boyer on the balance beam at the 2018 European Championships

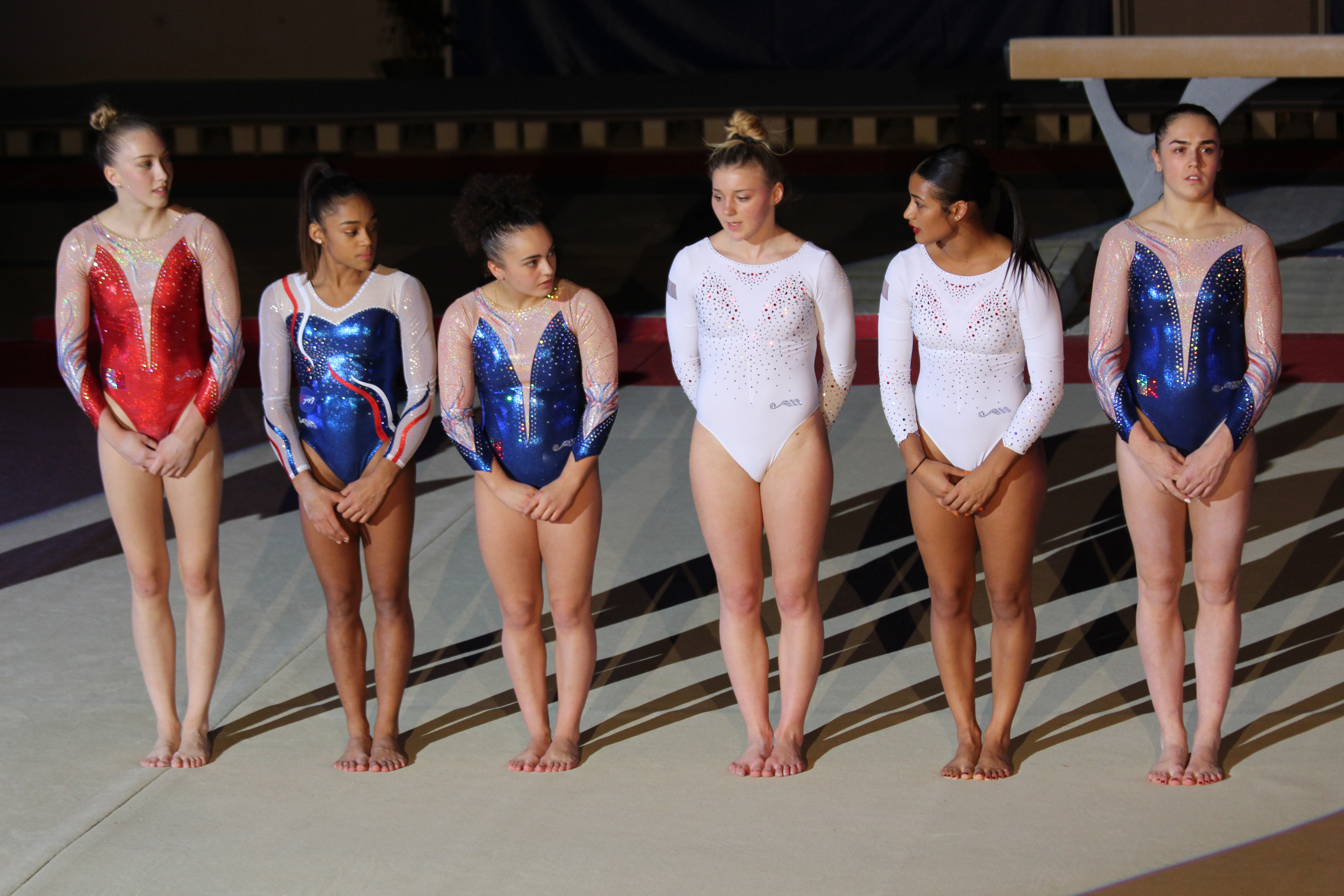
The French team at the Sainté Gym Show in 2018. From left to right: Juliette Bossu, Mélanie de Jesus dos Santos, Coline Devillard, Lorette Charpy, Boyer, Louise Vanhille

| Year | Event | Team | AA | VT | UB | BB | FX |
Espoir
| 2010 | French Championships | | 3rd place, bronze medalist(s) | | | | |
| 2010 | French National Cup | | 5 | | | | |
| 2011 | French Championships | | 5 | | | | |
| 2011 | Tournoi Combs-la-Ville | 1st place, gold medalist(s) | | | | | |
| 2011 | French National Cup | | 1st place, gold medalist(s) | | | | |
| 2012 | French Championships | | 2nd place, silver medalist(s) | | | | |
| 2012 | French National Cup | | 3rd place, bronze medalist(s) | | | | |
| 2013 | French Championships | | 7 | | | | |
| 2013 | International Gymnix | | 16 | | | | 8 |
Junior
| 2014 | French Championships | 2nd place, silver medalist(s) | 2nd place, silver medalist(s) | | | | |
| 2014 | BEL-FRA-ROU Friendly | 3rd place, bronze medalist(s) | 7 | | | | |
| 2014 | European Championships | 7 | 13 | | | | |
| 2014 | Top Gym Tournament | | 5 | 2nd place, silver medalist(s) | | 1st place, gold medalist(s) | |
| 2015 | French Championships | | | | 2nd place, silver medalist(s) | 1st place, gold medalist(s) | |
| 2015 | FIT Challenge | 2nd place, silver medalist(s) | 6 | | | | |
| 2015 | European Youth Olympic Festival | 6 | 9 | 1st place, gold medalist(s) | | | |
| 2015 | Elite Gym Massilia | 1st place, gold medalist(s) | 7 | 4 | | | |
Senior
| 2016 | City of Jesolo Trophy | 4 | | | | 4 | |
| 2016 | Olympic Test Event | 4 | | | | | |
| 2016 | Varna World Challenge Cup | | | | 6 | 1st place, gold medalist(s) | 5 |
| 2016 | European Championships | 3rd place, bronze medalist(s) | | | | 2nd place, silver medalist(s) | |
| 2016 | French Championships | | 1st place, gold medalist(s) | | 6 | 1st place, gold medalist(s) | |
| 2016 | Olympic Games | 11 | | | | 4 | |
| 2017 | City of Jesolo Trophy | 4 | 12 | | | 2nd place, silver medalist(s) | |
| 2017 | European Championships | | 16 | | | 7 | |
| 2017 | French Championships | | 2nd place, silver medalist(s) | | | 1st place, gold medalist(s) | 1st place, gold medalist(s) |
| 2017 | Paris World Challenge Cup | | | | | 2nd place, silver medalist(s) | 4 |
| 2017 | World Championships | | 21 | | | | |
| 2017 | Arthur Gander Memorial | | 1st place, gold medalist(s) | | | | |
| 2017 | Swiss Cup | 8 | | | | | |
| 2017 | Toyota International | | | | | 6 | 7 |
| 2018 | Doha World Cup | | | | | 2nd place, silver medalist(s) | 7 |
| 2018 | French Championships | | 4 | | | | 4 |
| 2018 | Mediterranean Games | 2nd place, silver medalist(s) | | | | 1st place, gold medalist(s) | |
| 2018 | Sainté Gym Cup | 1st place, gold medalist(s) | 7 | | | | |
| 2018 | European Championships | 2nd place, silver medalist(s) | | | | 3rd place, bronze medalist(s) | |
| 2018 | Paris World Challenge Cup | | | | | 2nd place, silver medalist(s) | |
| 2018 | World Championships | 5 | | | | | |
| 2018 | Cottbus World Cup | | | | | 6 | |
| 2019 | Baku World Cup | | | | | 2nd place, silver medalist(s) | 5 |
| 2019 | Doha World Cup | | | | | 3rd place, bronze medalist(s) | 5 |
| 2019 | European Championships | | | | | | 8 |
| 2019 | Worms Friendly | 3rd place, bronze medalist(s) | | | | | |
| 2019 | Paris World Challenge Cup | | | | | | 2nd place, silver medalist(s) |
| 2019 | World Championships | 5 | | | | | |
2021
| 2021 | European Championships | | WD | | | 6 | |
| 2021 | Varna World Challenge Cup | | | | | 2nd place, silver medalist(s) | |
| 2021 | French Championships | | 2nd place, silver medalist(s) | | 2nd place, silver medalist(s) | | 5 |
| 2021 | FIT Challenge | 1st place, gold medalist(s) | | | | | |
| 2021 | Olympic Games | 6 | | | | | |
2022
| 2022 | European Championships | 6 | | | | R3 | |
| 2022 | Paris Challenge Cup | | | | | 1st place, gold medalist(s) | |
| 2022 | World Championships | 8 | | | | 4 | |
| 2023 | Baku World Cup | | | | | 2nd place, silver medalist(s) | 1st place, gold medalist(s) |
| 2023 | European Championships | 6 | WD | | | | |
| 2023 | Paris Challenge Cup | | | | | 1st place, gold medalist(s) | |
| 2023 | World Championships | 3rd place, bronze medalist(s) | | | | | |
| 2024 | City of Jesolo Trophy | 5 | 24 | | | | |
| 2024 | European Championships | 3rd place, bronze medalist(s) | | | | 3rd place, bronze medalist(s) | |
| 2024 | Olympic Games | 11 | | | | | |
