= Gymnastics at the 2018 Mediterranean Games – Women's artistic team all-around =

Women's artistic team all-around at the 2018 Mediterranean Games
- Venue: Pavelló Olímpic de Reus
- Date: 23–24 June 2018
- Competitors: 42 from 9 nations
- Winning total: 155.250

Medalists
gold medal	Giada Grisetti; Caterina Cereghetti; Francesca Linari; Lara Mori; Martina Basile	Italy
silver medal	Marine Boyer; Grace Charpy; Morgane Osyssek-Reimer; Sheyen Petit; Louise Vanhille	France
bronze medal	Paula Raya; Helena Bonilla; Nora Fernandez; Ana Pérez; Cintia Rodriguez	Spain

The Women's artistic team all-around competition at the 2018 Mediterranean Games was held between the 23–24 June 2018 at the Pavelló Olímpic de Reus.

== Qualified teams ==
The following NOCs qualified a team for the event.

- Cyprus
- Egypt
- Spain
- France
- Greece
- Italy
- Portugal
- Slovenia
- Turkey

== Final ==
Rank	Team	Vault (gymnastics)	Uneven bars	Balance beam	Floor (gymnastics)	Total
1st place, gold medalist(s)	Italy	40.850 (3)	37.900 (2)	38.500 (2)	38.000 (1)	155.250
1st place, gold medalist(s)	Giada Grisetti (ITA)	13.550	12.850	13.000	12.600	52.000
1st place, gold medalist(s)	Caterina Cereghetti (ITA)	13.500	11.600			
1st place, gold medalist(s)	Francesca Linari (ITA)			12.500	12.250	
1st place, gold medalist(s)	Lara Mori (ITA)	13.350	12.900	13.000	13.150	52.400
1st place, gold medalist(s)	Martina Basile (ITA)	13.800	12.150	12.250	11.250	49.450
2nd place, silver medalist(s)	France	41.000 (2)	36.350 (3)	39.400 (1)	37.650 (2)	154.400
2nd place, silver medalist(s)	Marine Boyer (FRA)	13.800		13.950		
2nd place, silver medalist(s)	Grace Charpy (FRA)		11.000	12.000	12.150	
2nd place, silver medalist(s)	Morgane Osyssek-Reimer (FRA)	13.650	11.150		11.750	
2nd place, silver medalist(s)	Sheyen Petit (FRA)	13.450	11.950	12.500	12.850	50.750
2nd place, silver medalist(s)	Louise Vanhille (FRA)	13.550	13.250	12.950	12.650	52.400
3rd place, bronze medalist(s)	Spain	40.850 (3)	37.950 (1)	36.350 (5)	36.400 (4)	151.550
3rd place, bronze medalist(s)	Paula Raya (ESP)		12.800	11.550	12.000	
3rd place, bronze medalist(s)	Helena Bonilla (ESP)	13.350	11.750	11.350	11.700	48.150
3rd place, bronze medalist(s)	Nora Fernandez (ESP)	14.000	11.700			
3rd place, bronze medalist(s)	Ana Pérez (ESP)	13.500	13.400	12.750	12.000	51.650
3rd place, bronze medalist(s)	Cintia Rodriguez (ESP)	13.050		12.050	12.400	
4	Egypt	41.300 (1)	36.100 (4)	36.750 (3)	35.650 (5)	149.800
4	Farah Hussein (EGY)	13.225	12.850	12.350	10.800	49.450
4	Farah Salem (EGY)	12.700	12.200	12.700	11.600	49.200
4	Nancy Taman (EGY)	14.150			11.350	
4	Mandy Mohamed (EGY)	13.300	10.800	11.700	12.700	48.500
4	Sherine El-Zeiny (EGY)		11.050	9.950		
5	Turkey	40.250 (5)	34.900 (5)	35.050 (6)	36.450 (3)	146.650
5	Göksu Üçtaş Şanlı (TUR)	12.875	11.100	12.050	12.550	49.150
5	Demet Mutlu (TUR)	13.350	10.750	10.900	11.950	46.950
5	Tutya Yilmaz (TUR)	13.450	12.350	11.900	11.950	49.650
5	Ilayda Sahin (TUR)		11.450	11.100	11.050	
5	Seher Atalay (TUR)	13.050				
6	Slovenia	39.800 (6)	34.600 (6)	36.600 (4)	34.400 (7)	145.400
6	Teja Belak (SLO)	14.000	11.550	13.000		
6	Judita Zabukovec (SLO)	11.850	10.050		9.950	
6	Lucija Hribar (SLO)	13.400	12.750	11.800	10.650	48.600
6	Tjaša Kysselef (SLO)	13.000	10.300	11.150	12.100	45.700
6	Adela Sajn (SLO)			11.800	11.650	
7	Greece	38.600 (7)	34.200 (7)	33.300 (7)	35.150 (6)	141.250
7	Vasiliki Millousi (GRE)		12.100	12.500		
7	Ioanna Xoulogi (GRE)	12.400	11.200	10.800	11.650	46.050
7	Argyro Afrati (GRE)	12.975	7.500		11.650	
7	Evangelia Plyta (GRE)		10.900			
7	Evangelia Monokrousou (GRE)	12.950		10.000	11.850	
8	Portugal	38.350 (8)	33.150 (8)	32.500 (8)	33.500 (8)	137.500
8	Beatriz Dias (POR)	13.300	10.950	11.000	11.700	46.950
8	Leonor Silva (POR)	12.300	10.300	9.200	10.750	42.550
8	Mariana Pitrez (POR)	12.750	11.900	12.300	11.050	48.000
9	Cyprus	37.200 (9)	27.250 (9)	28.500 (9)	31.900 (9)	124.850
9	Anastasia Theocharous (CYP)	12.400	9.950	10.750	11.150	44.600
9	Foteini Chatzipetri (CYP)	5.900	5.900	8.950	9.850	36.500
9	Gloria Philassides (CYP)	12.025	9.150	8.800	10.900	41.150
9	|Maria Tofi (CYP)	12.150	8.150	7.800	7.100	35.200
