= Giorgia Villa =

Italian artistic gymnast

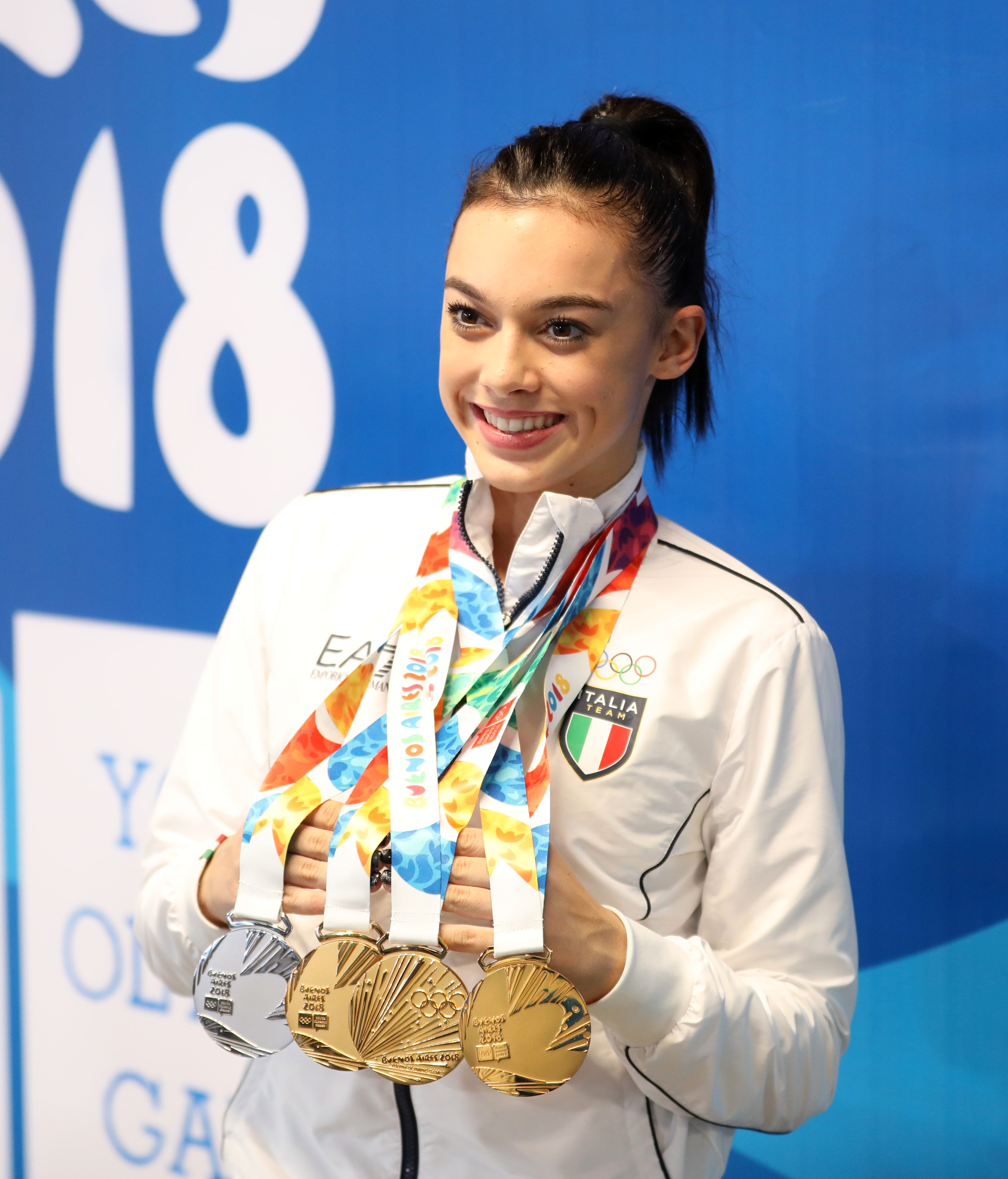
- Villa at the 2018 Youth Olympic Games

Personal information
- Born: February 23, 2003 (age 23) Ponte San Pietro, Lombardy, Italy

Gymnastics career
- Discipline: Women's artistic gymnastics
- Country represented: Italy (2015–2026)
- Club: Fiamme Oro
- Gym: Brixia
- Head coach: Enrico Casella
- Retired: 16 May 2026
Medal record
Women's artistic gymnastics
Representing Italy
Olympic Games
Silver medal – second place	2024 Paris	Team
World Championships
Bronze medal – third place	2019 Stuttgart	Team
European Championships
Gold medal – first place	2022 Munich	Team
Silver medal – second place	2023 Antalya	Team
Mediterranean Games
Gold medal – first place	2022 Oran	Team
Gold medal – first place	2022 Oran	Uneven Bars
Youth Olympic Games
Gold medal – first place	2018 Buenos Aires	All-Around
Gold medal – first place	2018 Buenos Aires	Vault
Gold medal – first place	2018 Buenos Aires	Floor Exercise
Silver medal – second place	2018 Buenos Aires	Uneven Bars
FIG World Cup Series
Event	1st	2nd	3rd
Apparatus World Cup	2	2	0
Total	2	2	0

Giorgia Villa (born 23 February 2003) is an Italian former artistic gymnast. She was a member of the teams that won silver at the 2024 Olympic Games and bronze at the 2019 World Championships. Additionally, she was part of the gold-winning teams at both the 2022 Mediterranean Games and the 2022 European Championships. Individually, she is the 2018, 2020, and 2021 Italian national champion, the 2018 Youth Olympic champion, and the 2018 European junior all-around champion.

== Early life ==
Giorgia Villa was born in Ponte San Pietro, Italy, on February 23, 2003. She started gymnastics when she was four. In 2010 she moved to Brescia to train at the International Academy of Brixia, the same gym in which Vanessa Ferrari trained.

== Junior gymnastics career ==
=== 2015–2017 ===
Villa made her international debut at the 2015 City of Jesolo Trophy as part of Italy's Young Dreams team alongside Asia and Alice D'Amato.

In 2017 Villa tore her achilles tendon during her floor exercise routine at the City of Jesolo Trophy and was unable to finish the competition. Villa later competed at the Italian National Championships where she placed first on uneven bars, the only event she competed on.

=== 2018 ===
Villa competed at the City of Jesolo Trophy in April. Italy placed first in the team competition, and individually Villa placed second in the all-around behind Vladislava Urazova of Russia, and fourth on vault and uneven bars. Villa competed at the 2018 European Women's Artistic Gymnastics Championships alongside Asia D'Amato, Alice D'Amato, Alessia Federici, and Elisa Iorio where Italy won team gold. Individually Villa won all-around and balance beam gold (ahead of Amelie Morgan of Great Britain), and vault and floor exercise silver, behind teammate Asia D'Amato and Romanian Ioana Stănciulescu respectively.

She was later selected to represent Italy at the 2018 Youth Olympics in Buenos Aires, Argentina. At the Youth Olympic Games she qualified to every event final, qualifying first on uneven bars and vault, second in the individual all-around and on floor exercise (behind Anastasia Bachynska of Ukraine), and seventh on balance beam. In the all-around final she was able to win the gold medal after top qualifier Bachynksa suffered mistakes on both balance beam and floor exercise. She was also the first all-around champion since the Youth Olympic Games inception that was not from Russia. She continued her strong performances into the event finals, winning gold on vault and floor exercise, ahead of Csenge Bácskay of Hungary and Morgan respectively, silver on uneven bars behind Russian Ksenia Klimenko, and finishing fourth on balance beam. Villa was selected as Italy's flag bearer for the closing ceremony.

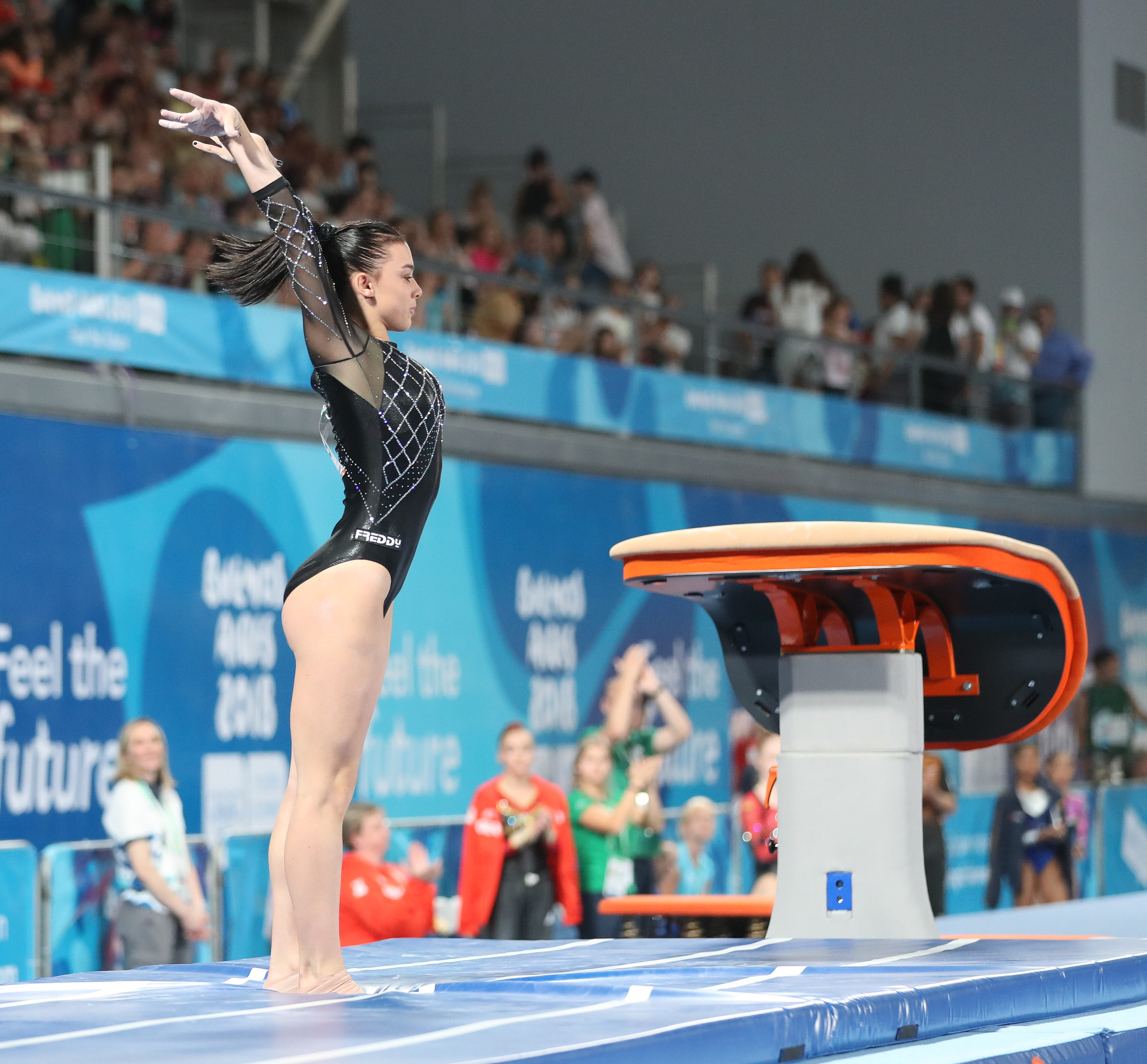
Vault qualifications

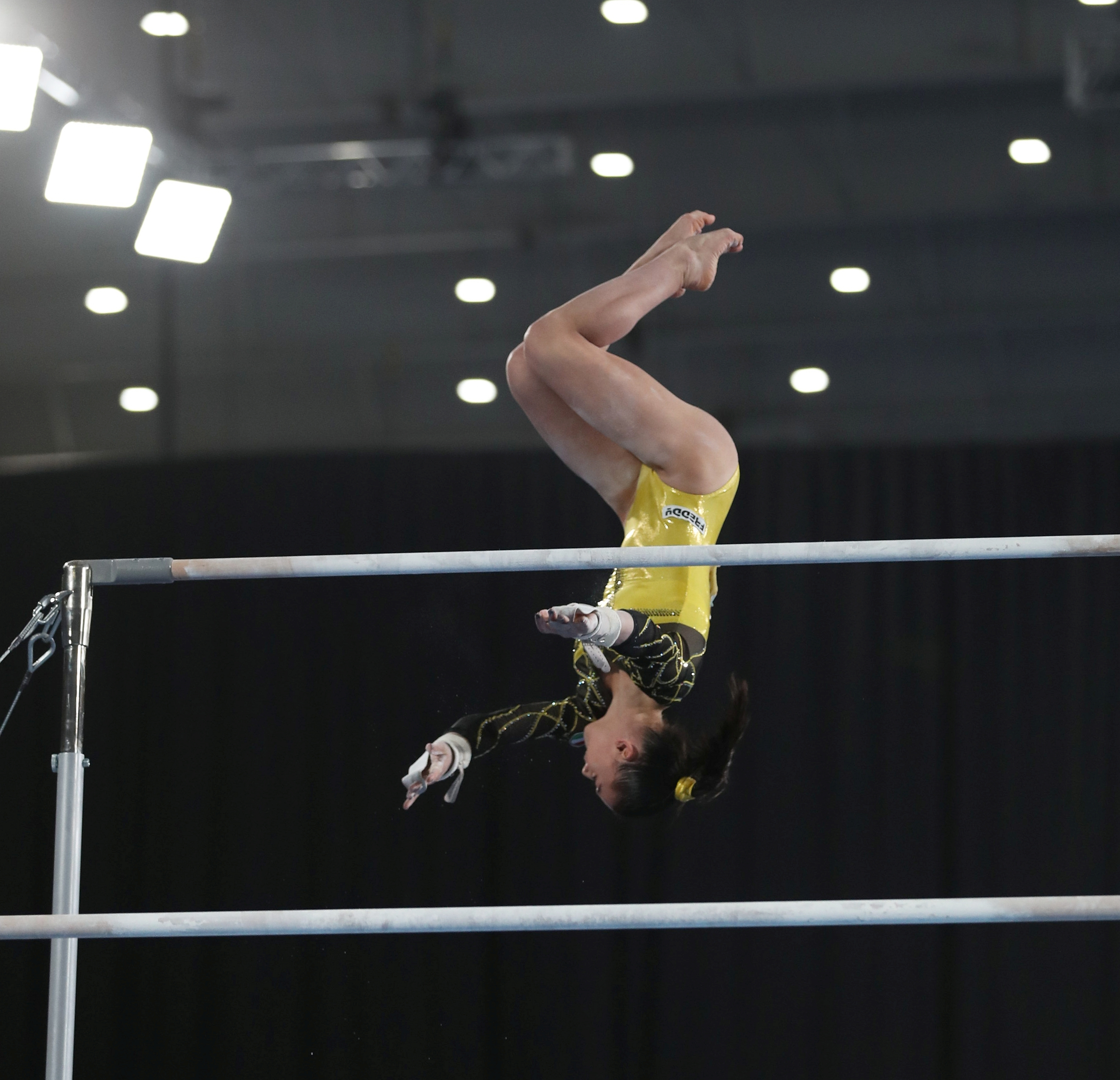
Uneven bars final

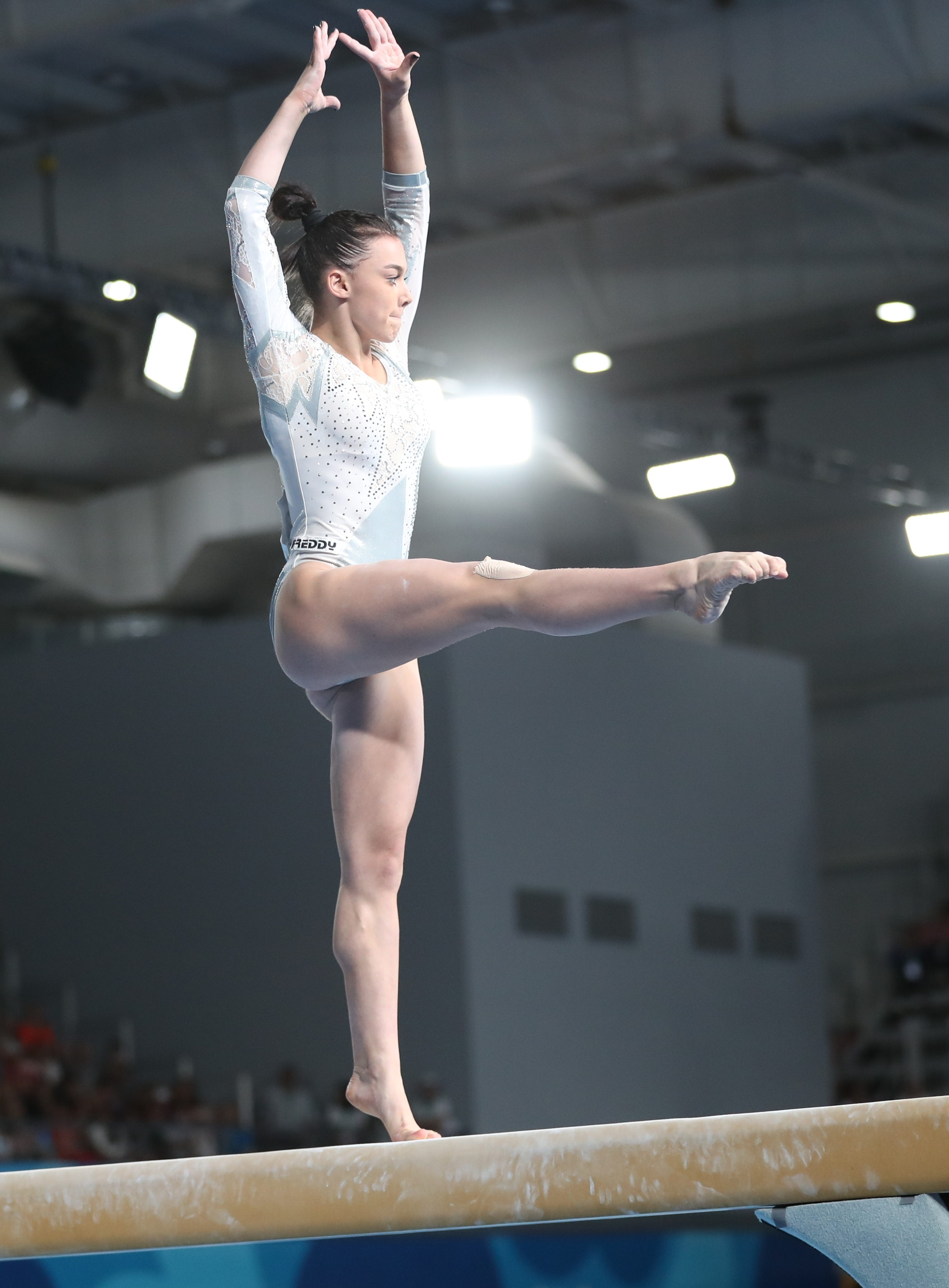
Balance beam final

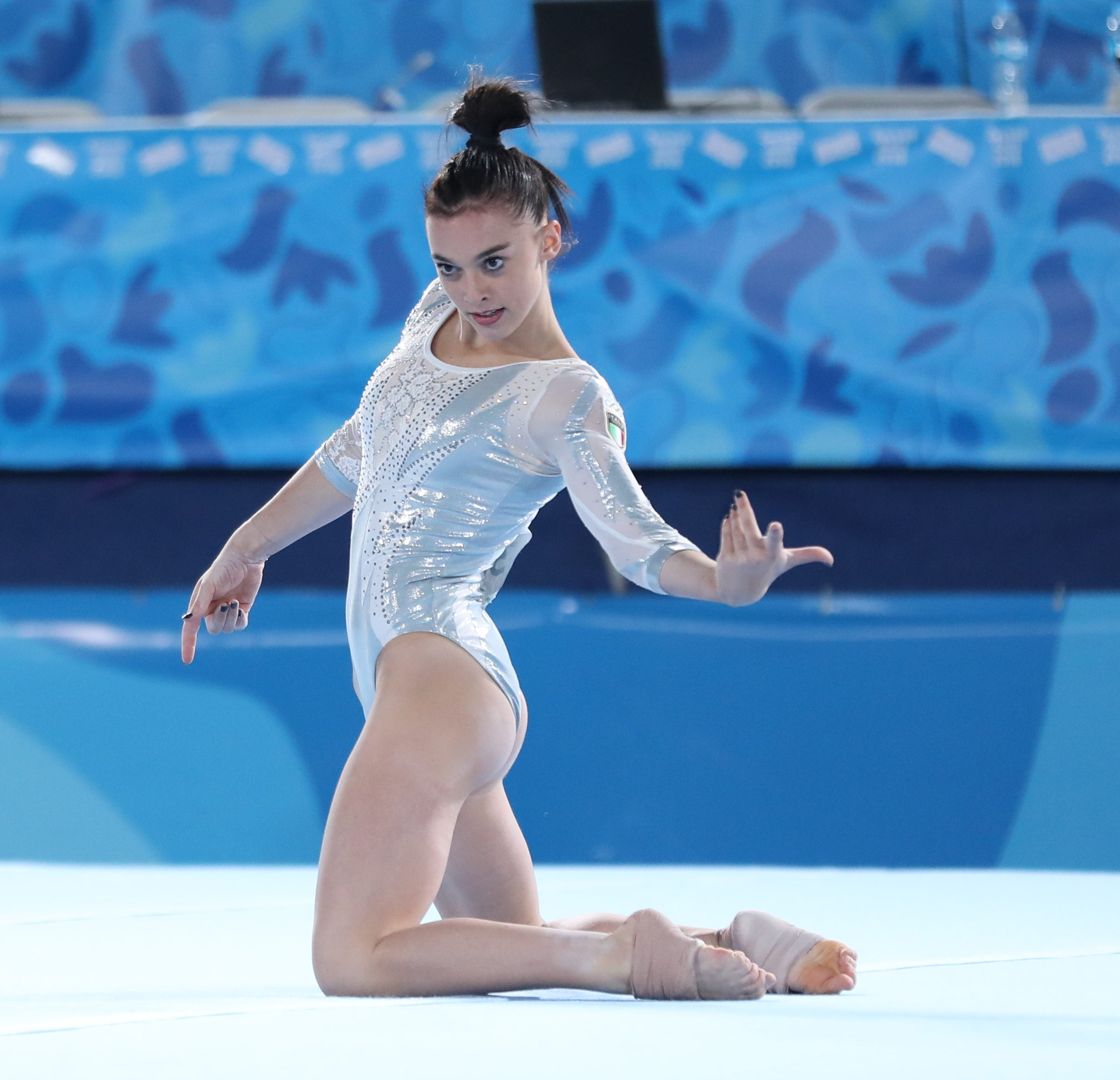
Floor exercise final

Villa at the 2018 Youth Olympics

== Senior gymnastics career ==
=== 2019 ===
Villa made her senior debut at the 1st Italian Serie A competition. She finished first in the team and all-around and scored highest on balance beam and second highest on vault, behind Alice D'Amato. She was slated to make her senior international debut at the 2019 City of Jesolo Trophy but had to withdraw at the last minute due to an injury to the middle finger of the right hand. It was later revealed that she broke her finger and would therefore have limited training leading up to the 2019 European Championships in April. In late March Villa competed at the 2nd Italian Serie A, but she only competed on uneven bars where she recorded the highest score.

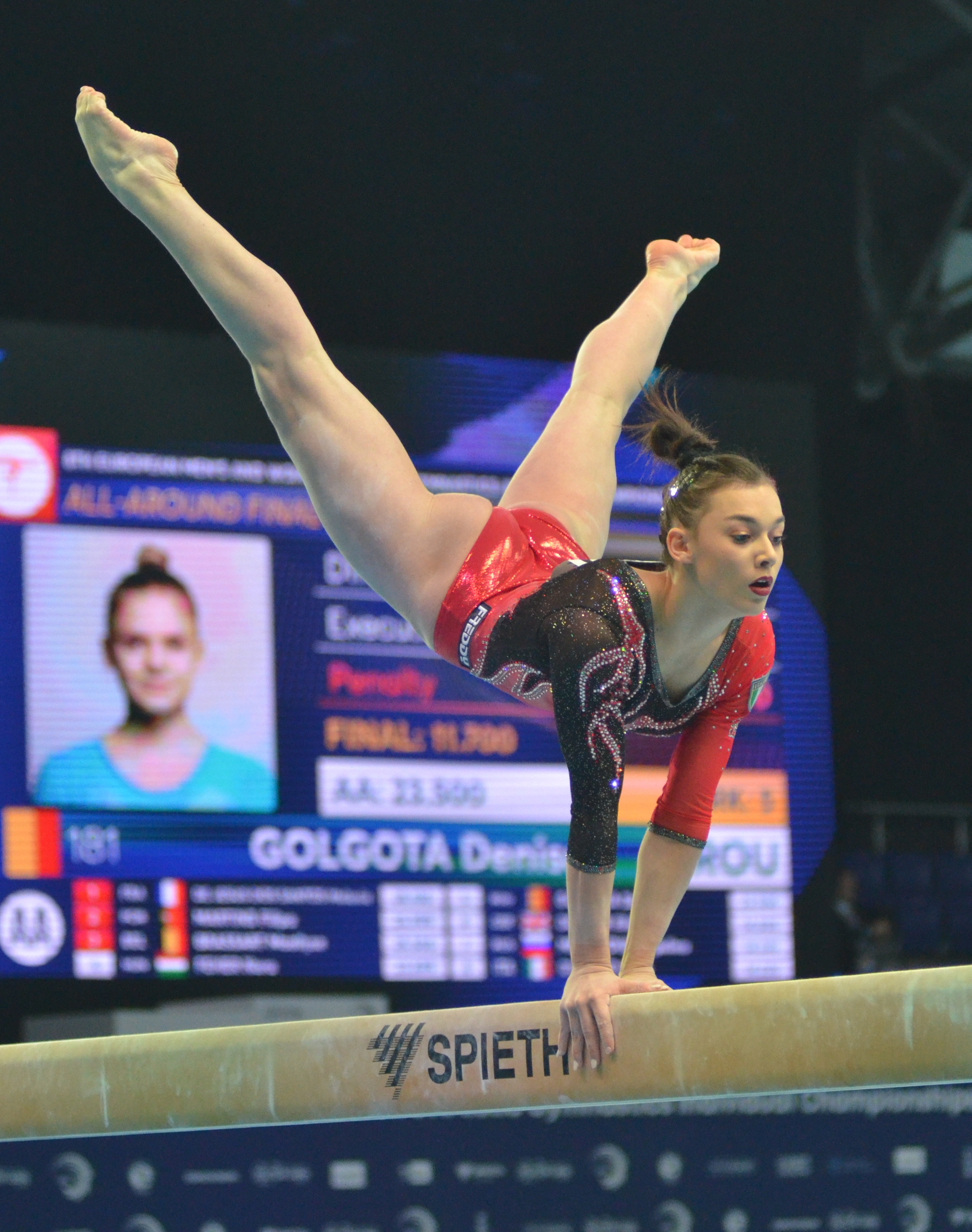
Villa competing at the 2019 European Championships

In April, Villa was officially named to the team to compete at the 2019 European Championships alongside Iorio and the D'Amato twins. Villa qualified to the all-around final in seventh place after falling off the uneven bars and qualified to the balance beam final in first. In the all-around final she managed sixth after making mistakes on bars and floor and falling on beam, and in the balance beam final another fall took her out of medal contention.

In May, Villa competed at the 3rd Italian Serie A where she placed first in the all-around and on vault, uneven bars, and balance beam. In August, Villa competed at the Heerenveen Friendly where she helped Italy win gold in the team competition ahead of the Netherlands and Norway, and individually she won gold in the all-around despite falling on the uneven bars, finishing ahead of Eythora Thorsdottir. Additionally, she recorded the highest balance beam score and the second highest vault and floor exercise scores. On September 4 Villa was named to the team to compete at the 2019 World Championships in Stuttgart, Germany alongside Alice D'Amato, Asia D'Amato, Elisa Iorio, and Desiree Carofiglio.

During qualifications at the World Championships, Villa helped Italy qualify to the team final in eighth place; as a result Italy also qualified to the 2020 Olympic Games in Tokyo. Individually, she qualified to the all-around final in twelfth place. In the team final, Villa competed on all four events to lead Italy to a surprise bronze medal – Italy's first team medal since the 1950 World Artistic Gymnastics Championships. They ended up finishing behind the United States, winning their fifth consecutive title, and Russia but finished ahead of China, who originally qualified to the final in second place. During the all-around Villa finished in sixteenth place after falling off of the balance beam. She received the fourth highest score on vault behind Simone Biles of the United States, Aline Friess of France, and Giulia Steingruber of Switzerland and the fifth highest score on uneven bars behind Nina Derwael of Belgium, Elisabeth Seitz of Germany, Biles, and Tang Xijing of China.

=== 2020 ===
In January, it was announced that Villa would represent Italy at the American Cup in March 2020. The following month, it was announced that Villa would also represent Italy at the Tokyo World Cup taking place on April 4. At the American Cup Villa finished in seventh place after falling on the uneven bars, balance beam, and on floor exercise. The Tokyo World Cup was later cancelled due to the COVID-19 pandemic in Japan.

In November, Villa competed at the Italian National Championships. She tied for first with Asia D'Amato after she fell on her vault. During event finals she won her fourth consecutive gold on the uneven bars, won silver on balance beam behind Martina Maggio, and gold on floor exercise.

=== 2021 ===
In April, Villa was selected to represent Italy at the European Championships in Basel alongside Alice D'Amato, Martina Maggio, and Vanessa Ferrari. During qualifications Villa only competed on the uneven bars and balance beam. Although she fell off the balance beam, she was able to qualify to the uneven bars event final. During the event final she finished in fourth place behind Angelina Melnikova, Vladislava Urazova, and Amelie Morgan.

In late June, Villa competed at the Flanders International Team Challenge where she helped Italy place third. Individually, she placed fifth in the all-around, but won gold on balance beam and bronze on the uneven bars. Villa was named to the team to represent Italy at the 2020 Summer Olympics alongside Alice and Asia D'Amato and Martina Maggio.

Villa won her third national all-around title in July; however, she injured her ankle during floor exercise and was unable to compete at the Olympic Games.

=== 2022 ===
Villa competed at the DTB Pokal Team Challenge. Her scores on uneven bars and balance beam contributed towards Italy's second-place finish. Individually, she won gold on uneven bars. Villa next competed at the City of Jesolo Trophy. She helped Italy finish second as a team and individually placed third on the uneven bars. In June, Villa competed at the Mediterranean Games alongside Martina Maggio, Alice D'Amato, Asia D'Amato, and Angela Andreoli. Together they won gold in the team competition, over five points ahead of second place France. In August Villa competed at the European Championships. She contributed scores on uneven bars and balance beam towards Italy's first-place finish. During event finals, Villa placed fourth and seventh on uneven bars and balance beam respectively.

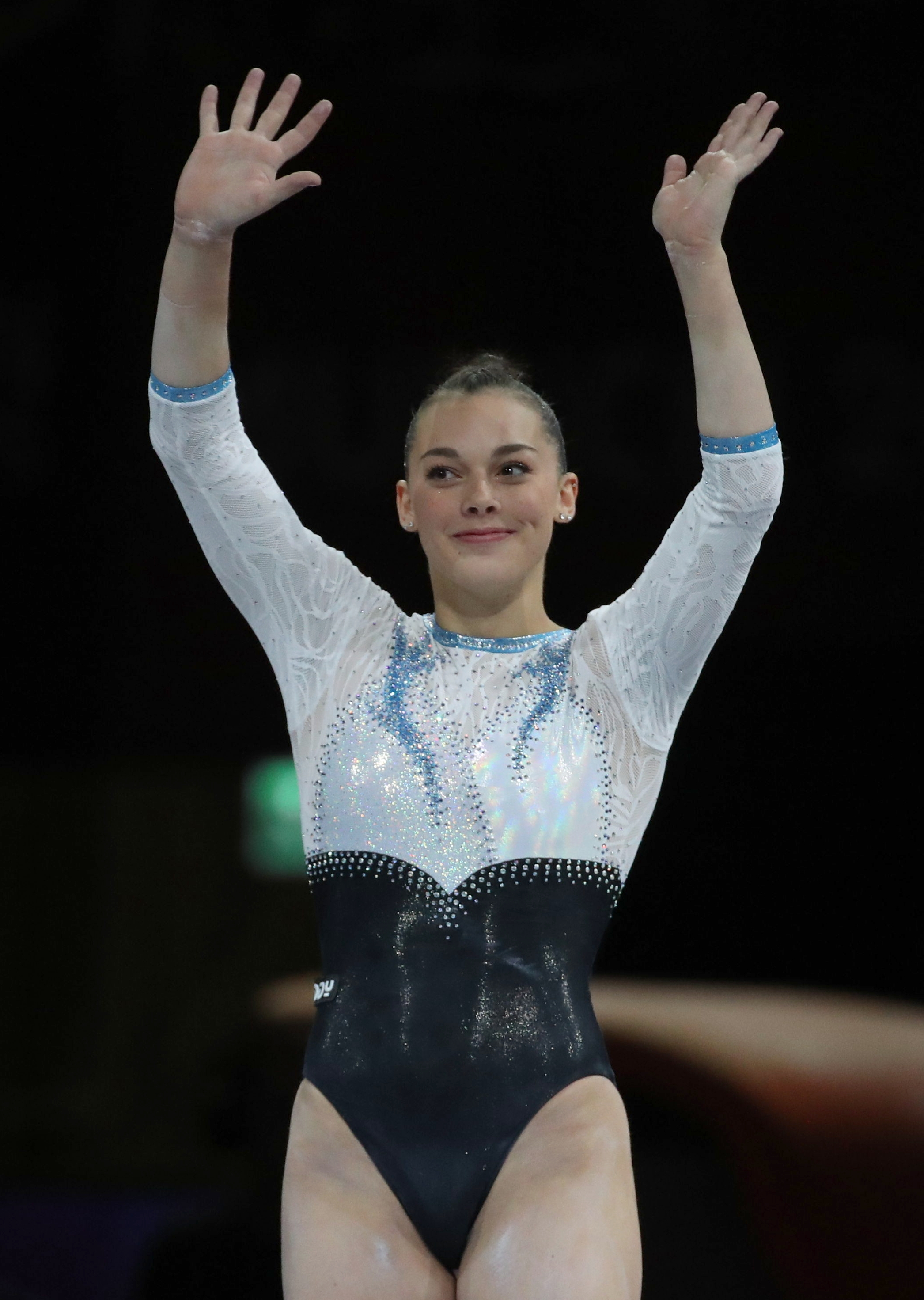
Introduction

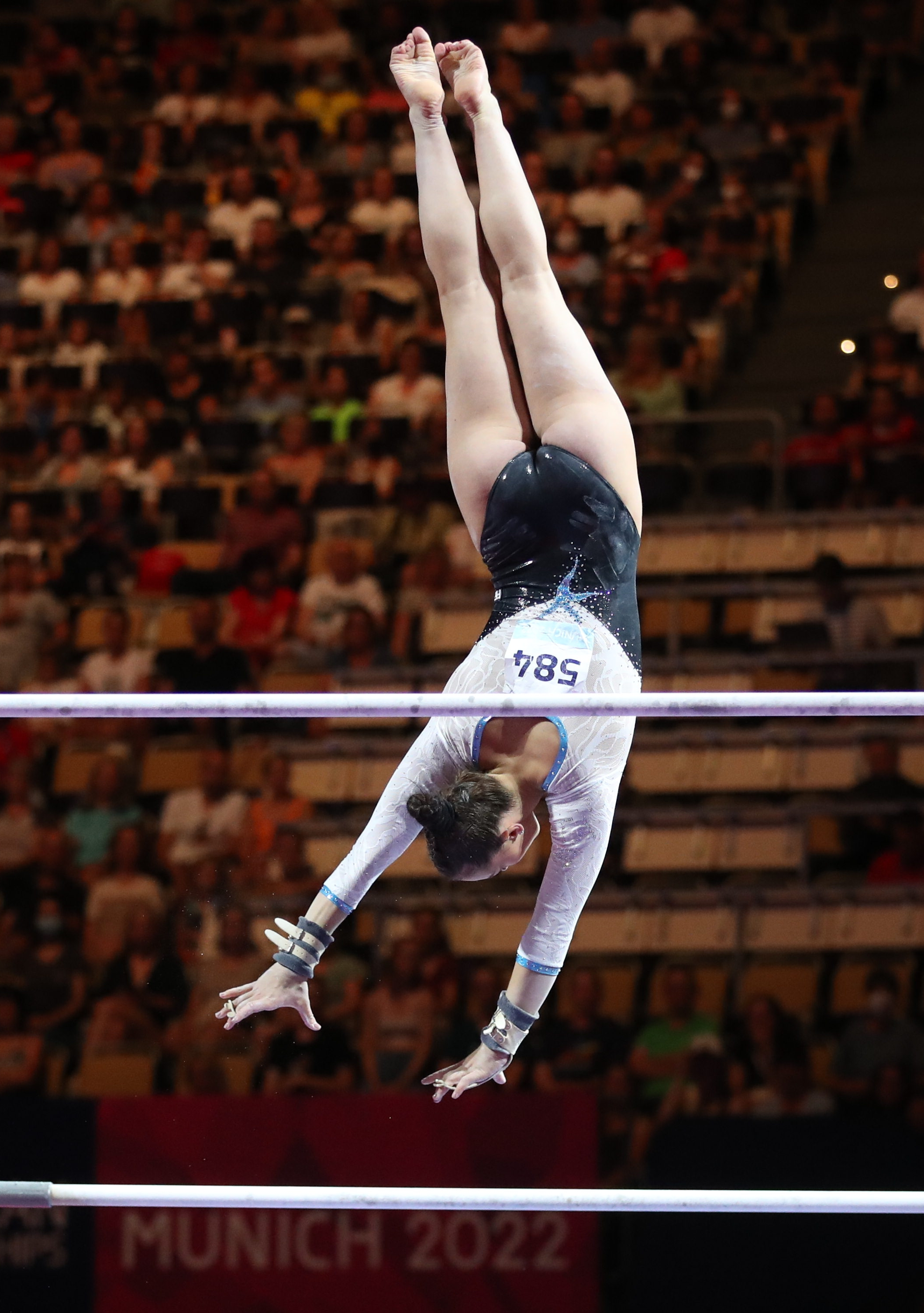
Uneven bars final

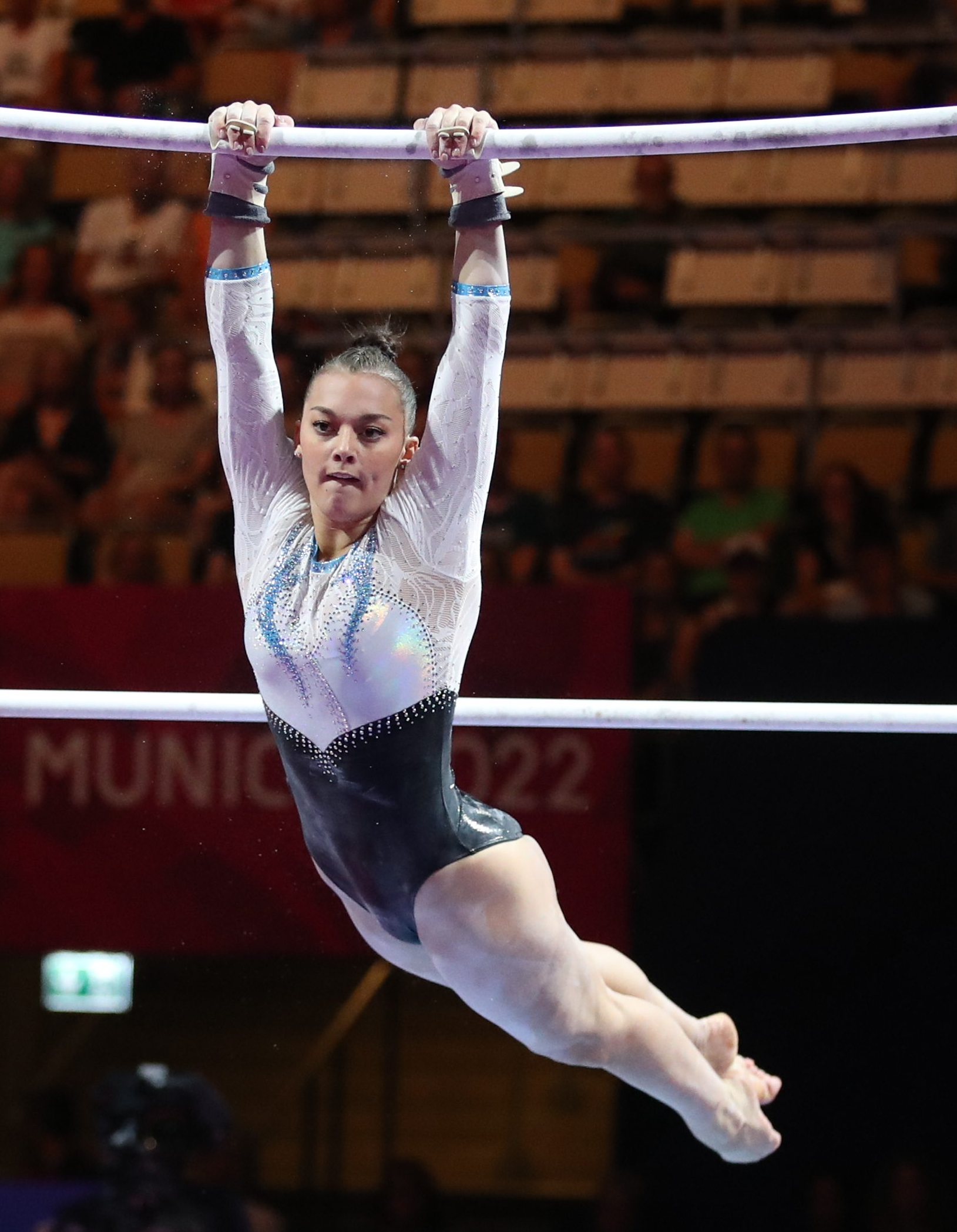
Uneven bars final

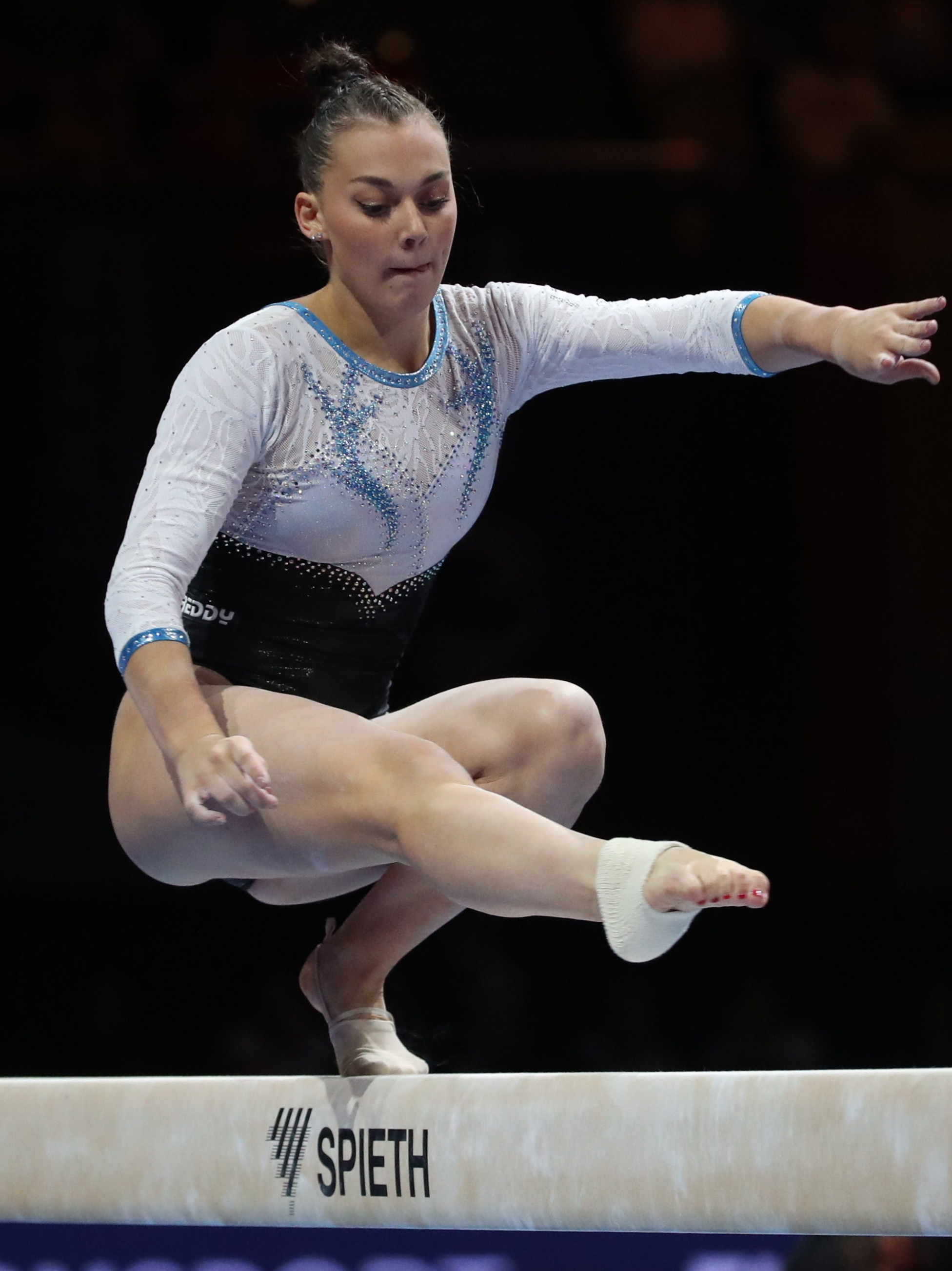
Balance beam final

Villa at the 2022 European Championships

In October Villa competed at the Italian National Championships. She made her return to the all-around for the first time since the previous year's national championships; she placed fourth. During event finals she co-won the uneven bars title alongside Maggio and placed third on balance beam. Villa was later named to the team to compete at the World Championships in Liverpool alongside Alice D'Amato, Martina Maggio, Manila Esposito, Veronica Mandriota, and alternate Elisa Iorio. They end up in fifth place, with Villa contributing on bars and beam.

=== 2023 ===
Villa competed at the Baku World Cup where she finished second on uneven bars and first on balance beam. She next competed at the European Championships where she helped Italy finish second as a team. Individually she finished fourth on the uneven bars for the third consecutive year. Villa next competed at the Cairo World Cup where she once again won gold on balance beam and silver on uneven bars. Her two wins on balance beam won her the World Cup series title on the apparatus.

=== 2024 ===
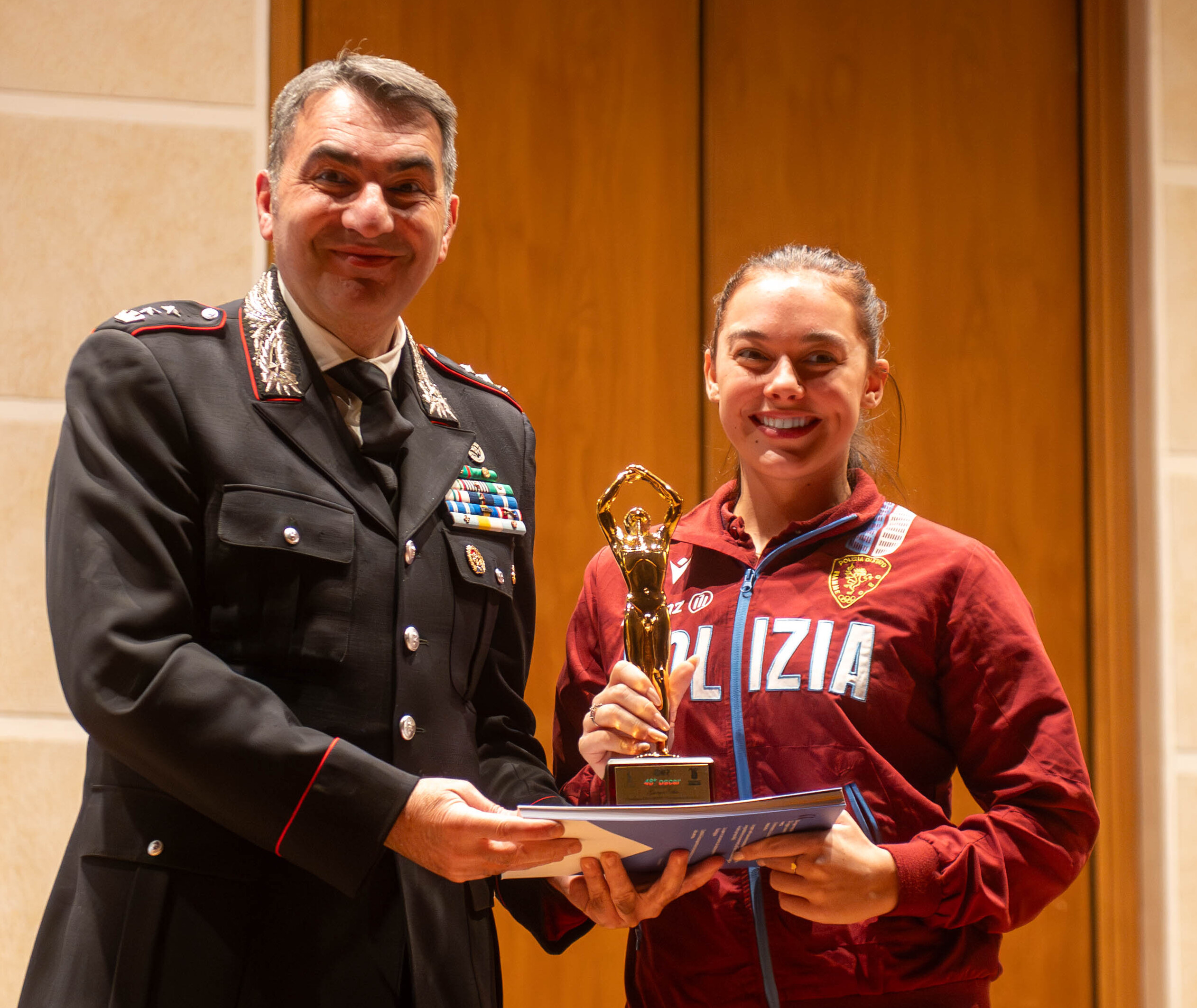
Villa at the 2024 Oscar of Brescia sport ceremony

In July, Villa competed at the Italian Championships where she placed fourth in the all-around. At the conclusion of the competition, she was named to the team to represent Italy at the 2024 Summer Olympics alongside Alice D'Amato, Angela Andreoli, Elisa Iorio, and Manila Esposito.

At the 2024 Olympic Games, Villa helped Italy qualify to the team final in second place. During the team final Villa contributed a score on the uneven bars towards Italy's second place finish, tying Italy's highest Olympic team placement. The last time the Italian women won an Olympic team medal was 96 years prior at the 1928 Olympic Games. During the Olympic Games, Villa went viral for her previous sponsorship deal with the Consorzio del Formaggio Parmigiano Reggiano, the Italian business consortium that promotes and ensures the quality and authenticity of Parmesan cheese.

=== 2026 ===
Villa announced her retirement from the sport on May 16, 2026.

== Competitive history ==
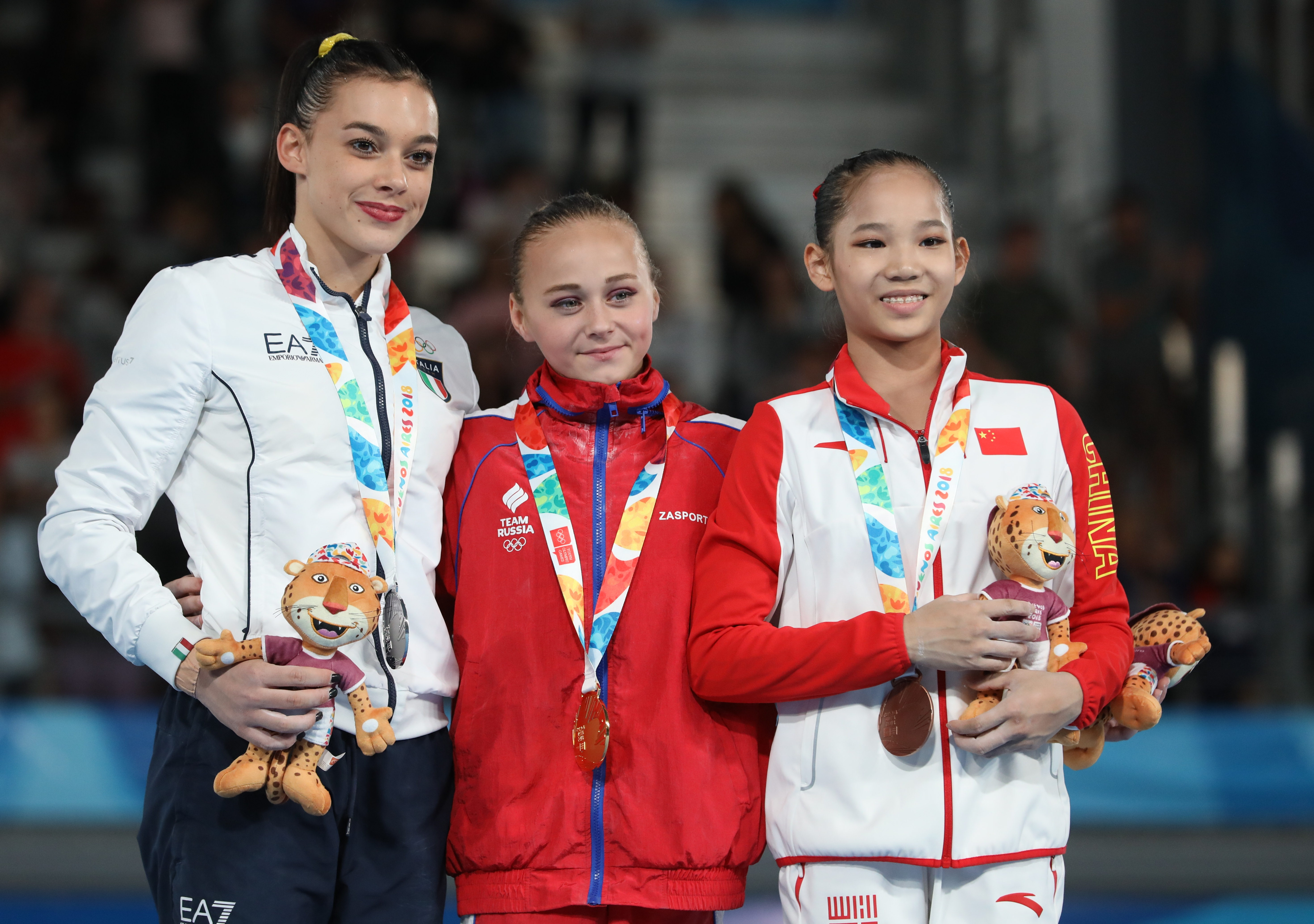
Villa (left) on the uneven bars podium at the 2018 Youth Olympic Games

Competitive history of Giorgia Villa at the junior level
Year	Event	Team	AA	VT	UB	BB	FX
2015	3rd Italian Serie A	1st place, gold medalist(s)					
2015	City of Jesolo Trophy		15				
2015	4th Italian Serie A	1st place, gold medalist(s)					
2016	1st Italian Serie A	1st place, gold medalist(s)	1st place, gold medalist(s)				
2016	2nd Italian Serie A	1st place, gold medalist(s)	11				
2016	City of Jesolo Trophy		6		4		6
2016	3rd Italian Serie A	1st place, gold medalist(s)	2nd place, silver medalist(s)				
2016	4th Italian Serie A	1st place, gold medalist(s)	10				
2016	Italian Junior Friendly		2nd place, silver medalist(s)				
2016	Italian Championships				3rd place, bronze medalist(s)		2nd place, silver medalist(s)
2016	Tournoi International		1st place, gold medalist(s)				
2017	1st Italian Serie A	1st place, gold medalist(s)	1st place, gold medalist(s)				
2017	International Gymnix		3rd place, bronze medalist(s)	4		8	4
2017	City of Jesolo Trophy	2nd place, silver medalist(s)	DNF				
2017	Italian Championships				1st place, gold medalist(s)		
2017	4th Italian Serie A	1st place, gold medalist(s)					
2018	1st Italian Serie A	1st place, gold medalist(s)	1st place, gold medalist(s)				
2018	International Gymnix		5	2nd place, silver medalist(s)	4		4
2018	City of Jesolo Trophy	1st place, gold medalist(s)	2nd place, silver medalist(s)	4	4		7
2018	2nd Italian Serie A	1st place, gold medalist(s)	1st place, gold medalist(s)				
2018	3rd Italian Serie A	1st place, gold medalist(s)	1st place, gold medalist(s)				
2018	Italian Championships		1st place, gold medalist(s)		1st place, gold medalist(s)	2nd place, silver medalist(s)	2nd place, silver medalist(s)
2018	Pieve di Soligo Friendly	1st place, gold medalist(s)	2nd place, silver medalist(s)				
2018	European Championships	1st place, gold medalist(s)	1st place, gold medalist(s)	2nd place, silver medalist(s)	5	1st place, gold medalist(s)	2nd place, silver medalist(s)
2018	Youth Olympic Games		1st place, gold medalist(s)	1st place, gold medalist(s)	2nd place, silver medalist(s)	4	1st place, gold medalist(s)

Competitive history of Giorgia Villa at the senior level
Year	Event	Team	AA	VT	UB	BB	FX
2019	1st Italian Serie A	1st place, gold medalist(s)	1st place, gold medalist(s)	2nd place, silver medalist(s)		1st place, gold medalist(s)	
2019	2nd Italian Serie A	1st place, gold medalist(s)			1st place, gold medalist(s)		
2019	European Championships		6			8	
2019	3rd Italian Serie A	1st place, gold medalist(s)	1st place, gold medalist(s)	1st place, gold medalist(s)	1st place, gold medalist(s)	1st place, gold medalist(s)	
2019	Heerenveen Friendly	1st place, gold medalist(s)	1st place, gold medalist(s)				
2019	Italian Championships		3rd place, bronze medalist(s)		1st place, gold medalist(s)	1st place, gold medalist(s)	
2019	World Championships	3rd place, bronze medalist(s)	16				
2020	1st Italian Serie A	1st place, gold medalist(s)			1st place, gold medalist(s)	1st place, gold medalist(s)	
2020	American Cup		7				
2020	3rd Italian Serie A	1st place, gold medalist(s)			1st place, gold medalist(s)	1st place, gold medalist(s)	4
2020	National Championships		1st place, gold medalist(s)		1st place, gold medalist(s)	2nd place, silver medalist(s)	1st place, gold medalist(s)
2021	1st Italian Serie A	1st place, gold medalist(s)					
2021	3rd Italian Serie A	1st place, gold medalist(s)					
2021	European Championships				4		
2021	FIT Challenge	3rd place, bronze medalist(s)	5		3rd place, bronze medalist(s)	1st place, gold medalist(s)	7
2021	National Championships		1st place, gold medalist(s)				
2022	1st Italian Serie A	1st place, gold medalist(s)			3rd place, bronze medalist(s)		
2022	2nd Italian Serie A	1st place, gold medalist(s)			1st place, gold medalist(s)	1st place, gold medalist(s)	
2022	DTB Pokal Team Challenge	2nd place, silver medalist(s)			1st place, gold medalist(s)		
2022	City of Jesolo Trophy	2nd place, silver medalist(s)			3rd place, bronze medalist(s)		
2022	Mediterranean Games	1st place, gold medalist(s)			1st place, gold medalist(s)		
2022	European Championships	1st place, gold medalist(s)			4	7	
2022	National Championships		4		1st place, gold medalist(s)	3rd place, bronze medalist(s)	
2022	World Championships	5					
2023	Baku World Cup				2nd place, silver medalist(s)	1st place, gold medalist(s)	
2023	City of Jesolo Trophy	1st place, gold medalist(s)			2nd place, silver medalist(s)	5	
2023	European Championships	2nd place, silver medalist(s)			4		
2023	Cairo World Cup				2nd place, silver medalist(s)	1st place, gold medalist(s)	
2023	National Championships				3rd place, bronze medalist(s)		
2024	National Championships		4		3rd place, bronze medalist(s)	2nd place, silver medalist(s)	
2024	Olympic Games	2nd place, silver medalist(s)					

== Floor music ==
Year	Music Title
2017–2018	"That Man / Sing, Sing, Sing"
