= 2017 City of Jesolo Trophy =

- Venue: SGA Gymnasium
- Location: Jesolo, Italy
- Dates: April 1–2, 2017

The 2017 City of Jesolo Trophy was the 10th annual Trofeo di Jesolo gymnastics competition held in Jesolo, Italy. Both senior and junior gymnasts are invited to compete.

== Medal table ==
Rank	Nation	Gold	Silver	Bronze	Total
1	United States	9	5	5	19
2	Canada	2	1	1	4
3	Brazil	1	3	0	4
4	Italy	1	2	0	3
5	Russia	1	0	4	5
6	France	0	0	1	1
Totals (6 entries)		14	11	11	36

== Medalists ==
Event	Gold	Silver	Bronze
Senior
Team all-around	United States (USA); Morgan Hurd; Ashton Locklear; Riley McCusker; Victoria Nguyen	Brazil (BRA); Rebeca Andrade; Thaís Fidélis; Carolyne Pedro; Flávia Saraiva	Russia (RUS); Elena Eremina; Natalia Kapitonova; Angelina Melnikova; Daria Spiridonova
Individual all-around	Riley McCusker (USA)	Rebeca Andrade (BRA)	Abby Paulson (USA)
Vault	Shallon Olsen (CAN)	Sofia Busato (ITA)	Angelina Melnikova (RUS)
Uneven bars	Elena Eremina (RUS)	Riley McCusker (USA)	Ashton Locklear (USA)
Balance beam	Riley McCusker (USA)	Flávia Saraiva (BRA)	Marine Boyer (FRA)
Floor exercise	Abby Paulson (USA); Flávia Saraiva (BRA)	N/A	Angelina Melnikova (RUS)
Junior
Team all-around	United States (USA); Adeline Kenlin; Emma Malabuyo; Maile O'Keefe; Gabby Perea	Italy (ITA); Alice D’Amato; Asia D’Amato; Elisa Iorio; Giorgia Villa	Russia (RUS); Anastasia Agafonova; Ksenia Klimenko; Valeria Saifulina; Varvara Zubova
Individual all-around	Gabby Perea (USA)	Maile O'Keefe (USA)	Emma Malabuyo (USA)
Vault	Gabby Perea (USA)	Emma Malabuyo (USA)	Ana Padurariu (CAN)
Uneven bars	Elisa Iorio (ITA); Gabby Perea (USA)	N/A	Maile O'Keefe (USA)
Balance beam	Ana Padurariu (CAN)	Gabby Perea (USA)	Maile O'Keefe (USA)
Floor exercise	Emma Malabuyo (USA)	Carolann Héduit (FRA); Maile O'Keefe (USA)	N/A

== Results ==
=== Senior ===
==== All-Around ====
Rank	Gymnast	Vault (gymnastics)	Uneven bars	Balance beam	Floor (gymnastics)	Total
1st place, gold medalist(s)	Riley McCusker (USA)	14.600	15.050	14.200	12.750	56.600
2nd place, silver medalist(s)	Rebeca Andrade (BRA)	15.000	13.800	13.550	13.650	56.000
3rd place, bronze medalist(s)	Abby Paulson (USA)	13.700	14.300	14.200	13.600	55.800
4	Elena Eremina (RUS)	14.100	14.850	13.250	13.550	55.750
5	Flávia Saraiva (BRA)	14.300	13.600	13.650	13.850	55.400
6	Angelina Melnikova (RUS)	14.350	13.100	14.050	13.300	54.800
7	Victoria Nguyen (USA)	14.200	13.250	14.250	12.850	54.550
8	Alyona Shchennikova (USA)	14.650	14.400	12.250	13.200	54.500
9	Mélanie de Jesus dos Santos (FRA)	13.700	14.450	13.900	12.100	54.150
10	Morgan Hurd (USA)	14.700	13.400	12.600	13.200	53.900
11	Senna Deriks (BEL)	13.800	13.950	12.250	13.350	53.350
12	Marine Boyer (FRA)	13.450	12.850	13.900	13.000	53.200
12	Nina Derwael (BEL)	13.650	13.750	13.450	12.350	53.200
14	Francesca Linari (ITA)	13.550	13.150	13.250	13.200	53.150
15	Trinity Thomas (USA)	13.750	13.250	12.850	13.250	53.100
16	Natalia Kapitonova (RUS)	13.500	13.550	13.350	12.500	52.900
17	Giada Grisetti (ITA)	13.850	13.350	13.500	12.150	52.850
17	Daria Spiridonova (RUS)	13.350	14.200	12.750	12.550	52.850
19	Thaís Fidélis (BRA)	13.550	12.700	13.300	13.000	52.550
20	Shallon Olsen (CAN)	14.550	12.050	12.600	13.300	52.500

==== Vault ====
Rank	Gymnast	Vault 1	Vault 2	Average
Gold medal	Shallon Olsen (CAN)	14.650	14.350	14.500
Silver medal	Sofia Busato (ITA)	14.400	13.950	14.175
Bronze medal	Angelina Melnikova (RUS)	14.450	13.600	14.025
4	Desirée Carofiglio (ITA)	13.400	14.200	13.800
5	Brooklyn Moors (CAN)	13.750	13.500	13.625

==== Uneven Bars ====
Rank	Gymnast	D Score	E Score	ND	Total
Gold medal	Elena Eremina (RUS)	6.0	8.750		14.750
Silver medal	Riley McCusker (USA)	6.0	8.600		14.600
Bronze medal	Ashton Locklear (USA)	5.5	9.050		14.550
4	Senna Deriks (BEL)	5.6	8.350		13.950
5	Rebeca Andrade (BRA)	5.5	8.300		13.800
6	Lorette Charpy (FRA)	5.4	8.250		13.650
7	Daria Spiridonova (RUS)	5.4	7.600		13.000
8	Mélanie de Jesus dos Santos (FRA)	4.9	6.300		11.200

==== Balance Beam ====
Rank	Gymnast	D Score	E Score	ND	Total
Gold medal	Riley McCusker (USA)	5.5	8.700		14.200
Silver medal	Flávia Saraiva (BRA)	5.8	8.300		14.100
Silver medal	Marine Boyer (FRA)	5.8	8.300		14.100
4	Mélanie de Jesus dos Santos (FRA)	5.6	8.150		13.750
5	Victoria Nguyen (USA)	6.1	7.400		13.500
6	Rebeca Andrade (BRA)	5.4	7.950		13.350
7	Angelina Melnikova (RUS)	5.4	7.500		12.900
8	Giada Grisetti (ITA)	4.7	6.950		11.650

==== Floor Exercise ====
Rank	Gymnast	D Score	E Score	ND	Total
Gold medal	Abby Paulson (USA)	5.4	8.500		13.900
Gold medal	Flávia Saraiva (BRA)	5.1	8.800		13.900
Bronze medal	Angelina Melnikova (RUS)	5.4	8.400		13.800
4	Rebeca Andrade (BRA)	5.2	8.350		13.550
5	Senna Deriks (BEL)	5.1	8.350		13.450
6	Elena Eremina (RUS)	5.0	7.550		12.550
7	Audrey Rousseau (CAN)	4.6	8.000	-0.1	12.500
7	Shallon Olsen (CAN)	5.3	7.300	-0.1	12.500

== Participants ==
The following federations sent teams:

- Belgium
- Brazil
- Canada
- France
- Italy
- Russia
- United States
