= 2020 International Gymnix =

- Location: Montreal, Canada
- Dates: March 6-8
- Competitors: 1,350 from 10 nations
- Teams: United States; Canada; Belgium; Australia; Germany

The 2020 International Gymnix competition was the 29th edition of the International Gymnix competition. It was held in Montreal, Canada from March 6-8.

== Medal table ==
| Rank | Nation | Gold | Silver | Bronze | Total |
|---|---|---|---|---|---|
| 1 | United States (USA) | 15 | 7 | 3 | 25 |
| 2 | Canada (CAN) | 1 | 4 | 10 | 15 |
| 3 | Belgium (BEL) | 1 | 3 | 4 | 8 |
| 4 | Spain (ESP) | 1 | 0 | 1 | 2 |
| 5 | Australia (AUS) | 0 | 2 | 1 | 3 |
| Totals (5 entries) | | 18 | 16 | 19 | 53 |

== Results ==
| Event | Gold | Silver | Bronze |
|---|---|---|---|
Senior
| Team | United States; Emily Lee; Lilly Lippeatt; Faith Torrez; MyKayla Skinner | Belgium; Maellyse Brassart; Margaux Daveloose; Fien Enghels; Lisa Vaelen | Canada; Laurie Denommee; Sophie Marois; Quinn Skrupa; Rose-Kaying Woo |
| Individual all-around | Emily Lee (USA) | MyKayla Skinner (USA) | Audrey Rousseau (CAN) |
| Vault | MyKayla Skinner (USA) | Sophie Marois (CAN) | Mia St-Pierre (CAN) |
| Uneven Bars | MyKayla Skinner (USA) Fien Enghels (BEL) | Not awarded | Faith Torrez (USA) |
| Balance Beam | Faith Torrez (USA) | Kate McDonald (AUS) | Maellyse Brassart (BEL) |
| Floor Exercise | MyKayla Skinner (USA) | Emily Lee (USA) | Jade Vansteenkiste (BEL) |
Junior
| Team | United States; Skye Blakely; Katelyn Jong; Kaliya Lincoln; Konnor McClain | Belgium; Charlotte Beydts; Margaux Dandois; Keziah Langendock; Jutta Verkest | Canada; Rebeka Groulx; Rylee Miller; Sydney Turner; Alicia Wendland |
| Individual all-around | Skye Blakely (USA) | Konnor McClain (USA) | Keziah Langendock (BEL) |
| Vault | Konnor McClain (USA) | Skye Blakely (USA) | Bailey Inglis (CAN) |
| Uneven Bars | Konnor McClain (USA) | Skye Blakely (USA) | Jutta Verkest (BEL) |
| Balance Beam | Konnor McClain (USA) | Skye Blakely (USA) | Ava Stewart (CAN) |
| Floor Exercise | Konnor McClain (USA) | Bailey Inglis (CAN) | Skye Blakely (USA) |
Challenge
| Individual all-around | Sloane Blakely (USA) | Jordis Eichman (USA) | Charlotte Shin (AUS); Chloe Cho (USA) |
| Vault | Charlie Ann Barbeau (CAN) | Valerie Menezes-Thibault (CAN) | Claudia Villalba (ESP) |
| Uneven Bars | Alonna Kratzer (ESP) | Charlotte Shin (AUS) | Saki Yoshida (CAN) |
| Balance Beam | Sloane Blakely (USA) | Maya Peters (CAN) | Aurélie Tran (CAN) |
| Floor Exercise | Olivia Ahern (USA) | Zsofi Verleden (BEL) | Aurélie Tran (CAN); Alexa Tucker (CAN) |
