= Audrey Rousseau =

Canadian artistic gymnast (born 1999)

- Born: 23 November 1999 (age 26) LaSalle, Quebec

Gymnastics career
- Discipline: Women's artistic gymnastics
- Country represented: Canada (2015–present)
- Club: Gym Fly
- Head coach: Jacinthe Emard
Medal record
Women's artistic gymnastics
Representing Canada
FIG World Cup
Event	1st	2nd	3rd
Apparatus World Cup	0	1	1
World Challenge Cup	1	0	0
Total	1	1	1

Audrey Rousseau (born 23 November 1999) is a Canadian artistic gymnast. She competed at the 2015 and 2021 World Championships. At the 2019 Mersin World Challenge Cup, she won the gold medal on the balance beam, and she won two medals at the 2025 Doha World Cup.

== Gymnastics career ==
Rousseau competed at the 2014 International Gymnix alongside Rose-Kaying Woo, Shallon Olsen, and Megan Roberts, and they won the junior team silver medal behind Russia. Individually, she placed sixth in the all-around and fourth on the uneven bars.

Rousseau became age-eligible for senior competitions in 2015. At the 2015 City of Jesolo Trophy, she helped Canada win the team bronze medal. She competed at the 2015 World Champiopnships and helped Canada advance into the team final and thus earn an Olympic berth. She competed on the floor exercise in the team final where Canada finished sixth.

Rousseau helped Canada win the silver medal behind the United States at the 2016 Pacific Rim Championships. She finished seventh in the floor exercise final at the 2017 City of Jesolo Trophy. In June 2017, she had surgery on her hand. She announced her retirement in February 2018 due to multiple injuries, but she decided to return to competition in 2019.

At the 2019 International Gymnix, Rousseau won a vault gold medal and a silver medal on the floor exercise behind Emily Lee. She won the balance beam title at the 2019 Mersin World Challenge Cup, and she finished fourth on the vault and seventh on the floor exercise. She won the all-around bronze medal, behind Lee and MyKayla Skinner at the 2020 International Gymnix. She then competed at the 2020 Baku World Cup and finished third on the floor exercise during the qualification round. However, the event finals were canceled due to the breakout of the COVID-19 pandemic in Azerbaijan.

Rousseau competed at the 2021 World Championships and was the first reserve for the vault final. At the 2023 Szombathely World Challenge Cup, she finished fifth on the uneven bars and seventh on the floor exercise. She won the uneven bars bronze medal and the floor exercise silver medal at the 2025 Doha World Cup.
