= Jade Vansteenkiste =

Belgian artistic gymnast (born 2003)

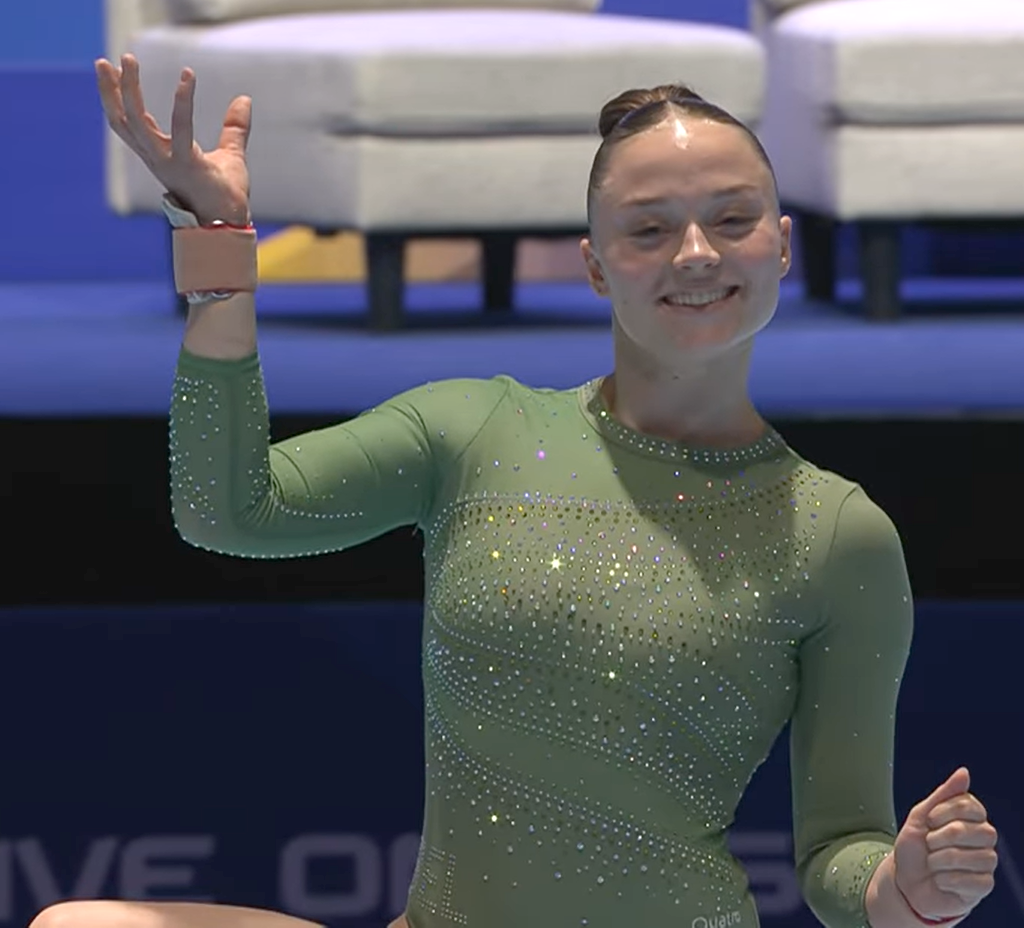
- Vansteenkiste at the 2025 World University Games

Personal information
- Full name: Jade Vansteenkiste
- Born: 17 July 2003 (age 23) Izegem, Belgium
- Height: 158 cm (5 ft 2 in)

Gymnastics career
- Discipline: Women's artistic gymnastics
- Country represented: Belgium; (2016-present)
- Club: Gym Izegem
- Gym: Topsportschool Gent
- Head coach: Ulla Koch
- Former coaches: Marjorie Heuls, Yves Kieffer
Medal record
Representing Belgium
World University Games
| Bronze medal – third place | 2025 Rhine-Ruhr | Floor exercise |

Jade Vansteenkiste (born 17 July 2003) is a Belgian artistic gymnast. She is the 2025 World University Games floor exercise bronze medalist. She competed at the 2019 World Championships, helping Belgium qualify for the 2020 Summer Olympics.

== Personal life ==
Jade Vansteenkiste was born on 17 July 2003, in Izegem. Her parents, Roy and Evelyn, are former triathlon competitors. Vansteenkiste speaks both Dutch and English.

== Career ==
Vansteenkiste competed at the 2018 Junior European Championships along with Stacy Bertrandt, Margaux Daveloose, Fien Enghels, and Noemie Louon, and they finished 6th.

Vansteenkiste became eligible for senior competition in 2019. She competed at the 2019 European Championships where she finished 20th in the all-around final with a score of 48.798, and she finished 6th in the floor exercise final with a score of 13.233. She competed at the 2019 World Championships along with Maellyse Brassart, Senna Deriks, Nina Derwael, and Margaux Daveloose. The team finished in 10th place and qualified for a team spot to the 2020 Olympic Games.

At the 2020 International Gymnix, she won a bronze medal on the floor exercise behind MyKayla Skinner and Emily Lee. Vansteenkiste was selected for Belgium's Olympic pre-selection team of thirteen gymnasts, six of whom were chosen for the 2020 Olympic team.

== Competitive history ==
Competitive history of Jade Vansteenkiste at the junior level
| Year | Event | Team | AA | VT | UB | BB | FX |
|---|---|---|---|---|---|---|---|
| 2016 | Belgian Championships | | 1st place, gold medalist(s) | 2nd place, silver medalist(s) | | 1st place, gold medalist(s) | 3rd place, bronze medalist(s) |
| 2017 | Tournoi International | 6 | 32 | | | | |
| 2018 | Belgian Championships | | 6 | 1st place, gold medalist(s) | 3rd place, bronze medalist(s) | | |
| 2018 | Heerenveen Friendly | 2nd place, silver medalist(s) | 6 | | | | |
| 2018 | Junior European Championships | 6 | | | | | |
| 2018 | Elite Gym Massilia | 3rd place, bronze medalist(s) | 29 | | | | |

Competitive history of Jade Vansteenkiste at the senior level
| Year | Event | Team | AA | VT | UB | BB | FX |
|---|---|---|---|---|---|---|---|
| 2019 | International Gymnix | 6 | 19 | | | | |
| 2019 | European Championships | | 20 | | | | 6 |
| 2019 | FIT Challenge | 3rd place, bronze medalist(s) | 17 | | | | 3rd place, bronze medalist(s) |
| 2019 | Worms Friendly | 2nd place, silver medalist(s) | 11 | | | | 1st place, gold medalist(s) |
| 2019 | World Championships | 10 | | | | | |
| 2020 | International Gymnix | | 8 | | | | 3rd place, bronze medalist(s) |
| 2024 | DTB Pokal Team Challenge | 7 | 9 | | | | |
| 2024 | European Championships | 9 | | | | | |
| 2025 | Magglingen Friendly | 2nd place, silver medalist(s) | 5 | 3rd place, bronze medalist(s) | | | |
| 2025 | European Championships | 10 | 13 | | | | |
| 2025 | World University Games | | 5 | | | | 3rd place, bronze medalist(s) |
| 2026 | City of Jesolo Trophy | 9 | | | | | |
| 2026 | European Championships | 8 | | | | | |
| 2026 | World Championships | | | | | | |
