= 2017 Artistic Gymnastics World Championships – Women's qualification =

This page lists the women's qualification results of the 2017 Artistic Gymnastics World Championships.

== Individual all-around ==
Rank	Gymnast	Nation	Vault (gymnastics)	Uneven bars	Balance beam	Floor (gymnastics)	Total	Qual.
1	Mai Murakami	Japan	14.633	13.900	13.200	14.200	55.933	Q
2	Ragan Smith	United States	14.466	14.133	12.900	14.433	55.932	Q
3	Elsabeth Black	Canada	14.500	14.400	13.433	13.433	55.766	Q
4	Melanie de Jesus dos Santos	France	14.500	14.500	13.066	13.233	55.299	Q
5	Elena Eremina	Russia	13.866	15.100	13.233	12.800	54.999	Q
6	Morgan Hurd	United States	14.466	14.333	13.500	12.533	54.832	Q
7	Diana Varinska	Ukraine	13.716	14.533	13.033	12.600	53.915	Q
8	Nina Derwael	Belgium	13.566	14.966	12.333	12.733	53.598	Q
9	Aiko Sugihara	Japan	14.066	13.300	12.466	13.433	53.265	Q
10	Angelina Melnikova	Russia	14.400	14.966	12.600	11.166	53.132	Q
11	Giulia Steingruber	Switzerland	15.100	12.833	11.933	13.266	53.132	Q
12	Tabea Alt	Germany	14.200	12.366	13.533	12.933	53.032	Q
13	Amy Tinkler	Great Britain	14.366	13.066	12.066	13.333	52.831	Q
14	Ana Pérez	Spain	14.100	12.733	12.933	12.966	52.732	Q
15	Brooklyn Moors	Canada	14.166	13.066	11.533	13.866	52.631	Q
16	Wang Yan	China	14.400	13.400	11.266	13.366	52.432	Q
17	Thais Fidelis	Brazil	13.633	13.200	11.766	13.733	52.232	Q
18	Elisabeth Seitz	Germany	13.600	14.700	11.200	12.500	52.000	Q
19	Lara Mori	Italy	13.325	13.466	11.666	13.500	51.957	Q
20	Georgia Godwin	Australia	13.475	13.000	12.666	12.733	51.874	Q
21	Rune Hermans	Belgium	13.333	13.800	11.900	12.833	51.866	Q
22	Filipa Martins	Portugal	13.166	13.333	12.633	12.433	51.565	Q
23	Marine Boyer	France	13.633	13.200	12.466	12.100	51.399	Q
24	Alice Kinsella	Great Britain	13.666	13.533	11.200	12.966	51.365	Q
25	Maellyse Brassart	Belgium	13.741	12.533	12.200	12.333	50.867	-
26	Lee Eun Ju	South Korea	13.300	12.933	12.066	12.100	50.399	R
27	Ioana Crișan	Romania	13.600	12.600	11.233	12.800	50.233	R
28	Marina Nekrasova	Azerbaijan	14.108	11.933	11.766	12.166	49.973	R
29	Zsófia Kovács	Hungary	12.733	13.766	11.533	11.666	49.698	R
30	Ilaria Käslin	Switzerland	13.533 (36)	11.933 (56)	11.733 (39)	12.233 (41)	49.432	
31	Barbora Mokošová	Slovakia	13.533 (36)	12.900 (34)	10.600 (72)	12.100 (50)	49.133	
32	Jasmin Mader	Austria	13.466 (41)	11.766 (62)	11.633 (42)	12.100 (48)	48.965	
33	Cintia Rodríguez	Spain	12.633 (81)	11.433 (70)	12.066 (29)	12.700 (29)	48.832	
34	Claudia Cummins	South Africa	13.433 (43)	11.933 (54)	11.366 (50)	11.700 (76)	48.432	
35	Dayana Ardila	Colombia	13.933 (22)	11.466 (69)	10.666 (69)	12.233 (42)	48.298	
36	Sherine El-Zeiny	Egypt	13.433 (43)	13.533 (22)	9.566 (98)	11.466 (84)	47.998	
37	Irina Sazonova	Iceland	13.166 (67)	12.433 (44)	10.300 (79)	12.033 (56)	47.932	
38	Agustina Pisos	Argentina	12.966 (72)	11.966 (53)	11.000 (61)	11.966 (61)	47.898	
39	Naveen Daries	South Africa	13.400 (47)	11.233 (77)	11.166 (55)	12.000 (57)	47.799	
40	Lucija Hribar	Slovenia	13.333 (54)	12.600 (39)	10.133 (83)	11.700 (74)	47.766	
41	Talia Folino	Australia	13.400 (47)	13.200 (28)	10.933 (63)	10.166 (105)	47.699	
42	Yuliya Inshina	Azerbaijan	13.366 (52)	11.666 (64)	10.433 (75)	12.200 (44)	47.665	
43	Kim Jury	South Korea	13.433 (43)	10.366 (95)	11.433 (46)	12.133 (46)	47.365	
44	Victoria Mata	Mexico	13.333 (54)	11.700 (63)	10.366 (77)	11.966 (63)	47.365	
45	Dalia Al-Salty	Hungary	12.866 (74)	11.766 (61)	10.800 (67)	11.733 (73)	47.165	
46	Agnes Suto-Tuuha	Iceland	12.766 (75)	11.500 (67)	10.866 (64)	11.966 (60)	47.098	
47	Valeriia Osipova	Ukraine	13.533 (36)	10.500 (92)	10.833 (66)	12.200 (43)	47.066	
48	Veronika Cenková	Czech Republic	12.700 (80)	12.266 (47)	10.500 (74)	11.566 (80)	47.032	
49	Farah Hussein	Egypt	12.200 (90)	11.400 (73)	11.400 (49)	11.766 (71)	46.766	
50	Courtney McGregor	New Zealand	13.233 (61)	12.266 (48)	9.466 (101)	11.800 (70)	46.765	
51	Aneta Holasová	Czech Republic	12.766 (75)	11.133 (78)	10.333 (78)	12.400 (37)	46.632	
52	Dominiqua Belanyi	Iceland	12.600 (83)	11.600 (66)	11.000 (60)	11.366 (87)	46.566	
53	Fabienne Studer	Switzerland	13.500 (39)	11.066 (79)	9.900 (89)	11.800 (68)	46.266	
54	Helmi Murto	Finland	12.433 (88)	12.500 (42)	10.500 (73)	10.500 (101)	45.933	
55	Martine Skregelid	Norway	13.400 (47)	10.866 (84)	9.533 (99)	12.066 (52)	45.865	
56	Mariana Marianito	Portugal	11.433 (101)	10.633 (88)	11.433 (46)	12.266 (40)	45.765	
57	Lucie Jiříková	Czech Republic	13.200 (62)	11.366 (74)	9.866 (91)	11.100 (93)	45.532	
58	Mariana Pitrez	Portugal	11.933 (93)	11.833 (59)	9.866 (92)	11.833 (67)	45.465	
59	Rianna Mizzen	Australia	13.266 (60)	11.866 (58)	10.166 (82)	10.033 (106)	45.331	
60	Marlies Männersdorfer	Austria	12.900 (73)	9.800 (98)	10.633 (70)	11.966 (61)	45.299	
61	Ofir Netzer	Israel	12.566 (84)	11.400 (71)	10.633 (71)	10.500 (100)	45.099	
62	Mette Hulgaard	Denmark	12.741 (78)	11.033 (81)	9.766 (95)	11.366 (88)	44.906	
63	Yoana Yankova	Bulgaria	12.633 (81)	9.500 (100)	11.400 (48)	11.033 (94)	44.566	
64	Pamela Georgieva	Bulgaria	11.566 (98)	9.033 (102)	11.833 (36)	12.000 (57)	44.432	
65	Pamela Arriojas	Venezuela	12.433 (88)	11.466 (68)	8.166 (115)	11.700 (75)	43.765	
66	Anastasija Dubova	Latvia	11.666 (96)	10.366 (94)	10.933 (62)	10.400 (103)	43.365	
67	Mackenzie Robinson	Jamaica	11.866 (94)	10.033 (97)	9.900 (87)	11.533 (82)	43.332	
68	Pranati Nayak	India	13.400 (47)	10.333 (96)	10.033 (85)	9.100 (110)	42.866	
69	Aruna Budda Reddy	India	13.433 (43)	9.733 (99)	9.033 (108)	10.666 (99)	42.865	
70	Fang Ko-Ching	Chinese Taipei	11.666 (96)	11.300 (75)	8.933 (111)	10.866 (97)	42.765	
71	Ofir Kremer	Israel	11.800 (95)	10.833 (85)	9.066 (107)	9.700 (109)	41.399	
72	Agata Vostruchovaitė	Lithuania	12.033 (91)	10.500 (90)	8.733 (113)	10.000 (108)	41.266	
73	Sara Berardinelli	Italy	13.366 (52)	12.500 (43)	11.066 (58)		36.932	
74	Desiree Carofiglio	Italy	13.750 (26)	11.066 (80)		12.000 (59)	36.816	
75	Lorette Charpy	France		12.033 (51)	12.666 (15)	11.400 (86)	36.099	
76	Marija Ribalcenko	Latvia	11.466 (100)	7.766 (105)	6.533 (119)	10.233 (104)	35.998	
77	Marcia Vidiaux	Cuba	13.833 (25)	10.800 (86)		11.233 (89)	35.866	
78	Ahtziri Sandoval	Mexico	13.200 (64)	12.900 (35)	9.533 (100)		35.633	
79	Sung Ga-eun	South Korea	13.966 (21)		10.200 (81)	11.400 (85)	35.566	
80	Miriana Almeida	Mexico	13.200 (63)		9.900 (88)	12.466 (35)	35.566	
81	Maija Leinonen	Finland	0.000 (103)	11.866 (57)	11.600 (43)	12.033 (55)	35.499	
82	Farah Salem	Egypt		11.666 (65)	10.866 (65)	12.033 (54)	34.565	
83	Ginna Escobar	Colombia		10.866 (83)	11.033 (59)	12.066 (53)	33.965	
84	Camila Bonzo	Argentina	13.133 (69)	11.833 (60)	8.966 (110)		33.932	
85	Valentina Pardo	Colombia	13.466 (42)	10.900 (82)	9.433 (103)		33.799	
86	Milca León	Venezuela	12.033 (91)	5.166 (106)	7.466 (117)	8.766 (111)	33.431	
87	Lo Yu-Ju	Chinese Taipei	12.766 (77)		8.933 (112)	11.533 (83)	33.232	
88	Linnea Wang	Denmark		10.466 (93)	9.666 (96)	11.666 (77)	31.798	
89	Lai Pin-Ju	Chinese Taipei		8.266 (103)	9.300 (104)	11.966 (64)	29.532	
90	Jade Carey	United States	15.066 (2)			14.100 (3)	29.166	
91	Sae Miyakawa	Japan	14.900 (3)			13.133 (17)	28.033	
92	Shallon Olsen	Canada	14.366 (13)			13.133 (16)	27.499	
93	Asuka Teramoto	Japan		13.966 (16)	13.333 (5)		27.299	
94	Luo Huan	China		14.566 (8)	12.466 (20)		27.032	
95	Ashton Locklear	United States		14.566 (7)	12.333 (24)		26.899	
96	Sanne Wevers	Netherlands		13.800 (18)	12.733 (14)		26.533	
97	Pauline Schäfer	Germany			13.500 (2)	12.900 (22)	26.400	
98	Argyro Afrati	Greece	13.166 (66)	12.900 (35)			26.066	
99	Tisha Volleman	Netherlands	14.466 (8)			11.566 (81)	26.032	
100	Eythora Thorsdottir	Netherlands			12.833 (13)	13.033 (18)	25.866	
101	Claudia Fragapane	Great Britain			11.933 (32)	13.933 (4)	25.866	
102	Vanessa Ferrari	Italy			12.266 (25)	13.600 (7)	25.866	
103	Paula Mejías	Puerto Rico	13.200 (64)			12.566 (31)	25.766	
104	Cătălina Ponor	Romania			12.233 (26)	13.266 (14)	25.499	
105	Tjaša Kysselef	Slovenia	13.400 (51)			11.900 (65)	25.300	
106	Mayra Vaquie	Argentina	13.566 (34)	11.400 (72)			24.966	
107	Ana Đerek	Croatia			11.833 (35)	12.900 (23)	24.733	
108	Isabela Onyshko	Canada		12.266 (49)	12.400 (22)		24.666	
109	Chuang Hsiu-Ju	Chinese Taipei	13.100 (71)	11.300 (76)			24.400	
110	Yesenia Ferrera	Cuba			11.733 (40)	12.500 (34)	24.233	
111	Gaya Giladi	Israel	13.300 (58)		10.066 (84)		23.366	
112	Valeriia Iarmolenko	Ukraine			12.100 (28)	11.100 (92)	23.200	
113	Julie Søderstrøm	Norway	12.466 (87)	10.500 (91)			22.966	
114	Nora Fernández	Spain			10.033 (86)	12.366 (38)	22.399	
115	Isabella Brett	New Zealand			10.400 (76)	11.733 (72)	22.133	
116	Estella Mathewson	New Zealand			10.266 (80)	11.866 (66)	22.132	
117	Solveig Berg	Norway			11.133 (57)	10.800 (98)	21.933	
118	Cornelia Eksteen	South Africa			10.766 (68)	11.166 (90)	21.932	
119	Ioanna Xoulogi	Greece			9.633 (97)	12.125 (47)	21.758	
120	Camila Ambrosio	Argentina			9.233 (105)	11.800 (69)	21.033	
121	Valērija Grišāne	Latvia	11.533 (99)		9.433 (102)		20.966	
122	Ana Laura Wong	Panama	11.066 (102)		9.833 (93)		20.899	
123	Boglárka Tömböl	Hungary			9.833 (94)	10.933 (96)	20.766	
124	Yekaterina Chuikina	Kazakhstan			8.966 (109)	11.600 (79)	20.566	
125	Bùi Nguyễn Hải Yến	Vietnam	12.500 (85)		7.000 (118)		19.500	
126	Trương Khánh Vân	Vietnam			9.066 (106)	10.433 (102)	19.499	
127	Zhanerke Duisek	Kazakhstan		9.233 (101)	9.866 (90)		19.099	
128	Shailee Weiss	Israel		8.025 (104)		11.000 (95)	19.025	
129	Emilie Winther	Denmark			7.566 (116)	10.000 (107)	17.566	
130	Anastasia Ilyankova	Russia		15.066 (2)			15.066	
131	Fan Yilin	China		15.000 (3)			15.000	
132	Maria Paseka	Russia	14.866 (4)				14.866	
133	Georgia-Mae Fenton	Great Britain		14.533 (10)			14.533	
134	Oksana Chusovitina	Uzbekistan	14.366 (13)				14.366	
135	Kim Bùi	Germany		14.233 (14)			14.233	
136	Boglárka Dévai	Hungary	13.900 (23)				13.900	
137	Liu Tingting	China			13.233 (7)		13.233	
138	Coline Devillard	France	13.133 (70)				13.133	
139	Hana Kassem	Egypt	12.500 (85)				12.500	
140	Evangelia Plyta	Greece		12.333 (46)			12.333	
141	Jonna Adlerteg	Sweden		12.266 (50)			12.266	
142	Angelina Radivilova	Ukraine		12.033 (52)			12.033	
143	Lieke Wevers	Netherlands			11.166 (55)		11.166	
144	Tutya Yılmaz	Turkey		10.733 (87)			10.733	
145	Claudia Colom	Spain		10.633 (89)			10.633	
146	Ng Yan Yin	Hong Kong			8.300 (114)		8.300	
