= Lisa Vaelen =

Belgian artistic gymnast

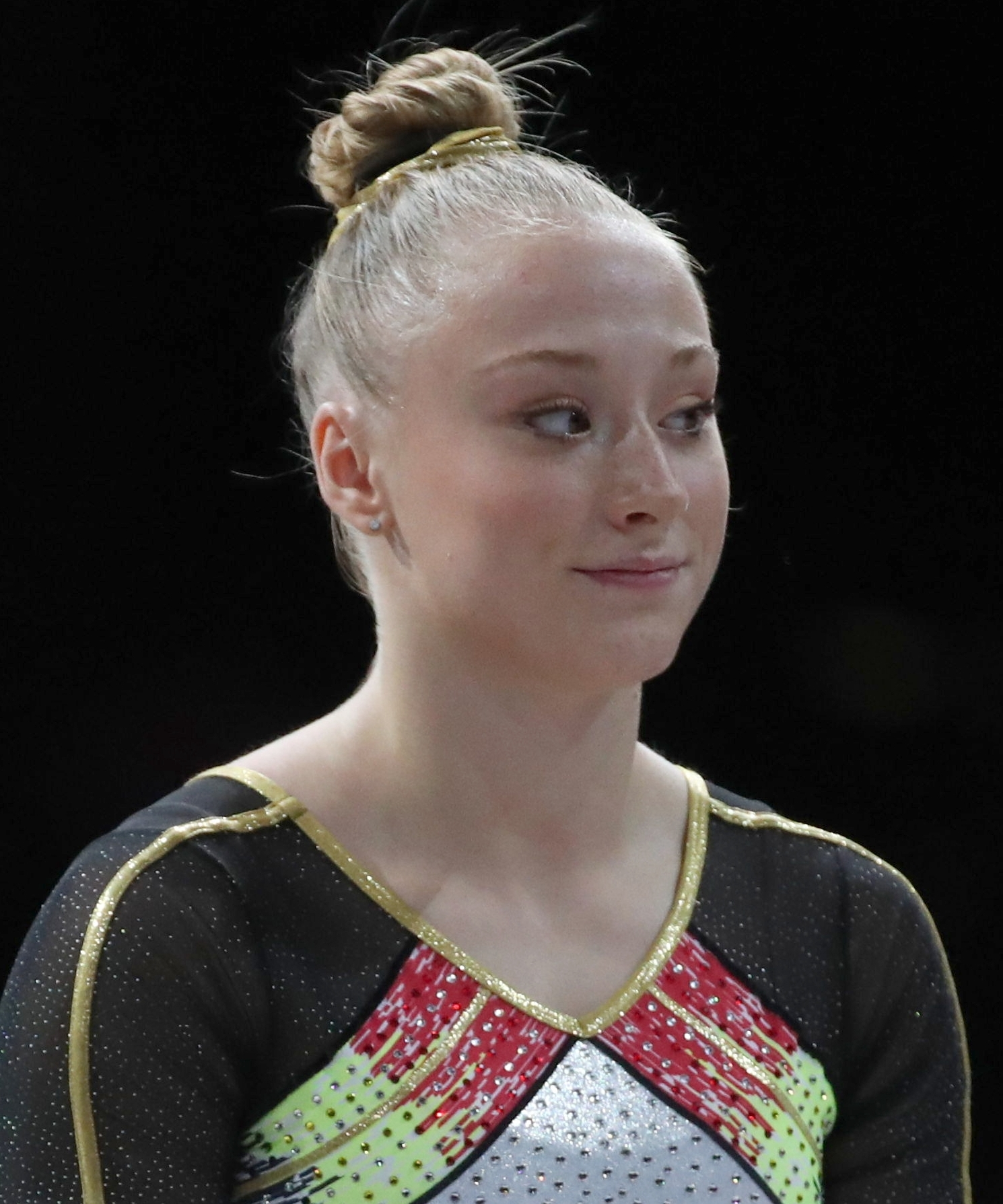
- Vaelen at the 2022 European Championships.

Personal information
- Born: 10 August 2004 (age 22) Bonheiden, Belgium
- Height: 159 cm (5 ft 3 in)

Gymnastics career
- Discipline: Women's artistic gymnastics
- Country represented: Belgium; (2017–present)
- Club: De Gympies Keerbergen
- Gym: Topsportschool Gent
- Head coach: Ulla Koch
- Former coaches: Marjorie Heuls, Yves Kieffer
Medal record
Representing Belgium
European Championships
Bronze medal – third place	2023 Antalya	Vault
Bronze medal – third place	2025 Leipzig	Vault
Bronze medal – third place	2026 Zagreb	Vault
FIG World Cup
Event / 1st / 2nd / 3rd; World Challenge Cup / 1 / 0 / 2

Lisa Vaelen (born 10 August 2004) is a Belgian artistic gymnast. She is a three-time European bronze medalist on vault, having won bronze in 2023, 2025, and 2026. She represented Belgium at the 2020 Summer Olympics.

== Junior career ==
=== 2016-2017 ===
At the 2016 Belgian Championships, Vaelen swept the gold medals on every event and in the all-around in the Junior A-12 Division. She then made her international debut at the 2016 Gymnova Cup and won the gold medal in the all-around in the Espoir division.

At the 2017 WOGA Classic, Vaelen finished sixth in the all-around and placed eighth with the Belgian team. She then competed at the Belgian Championships and won the bronze medal in the all-around. Then at the 2017 Gymnova Cup, she won the silver medal in the all-around and on vault and balance beam, and she won the bronze medal on the floor exercise. Her final meet of the 2017 season was the Top Gym Tournament where she placed eighth in the all-around and on vault, and she finished fifteenth on the uneven bars.

=== 2018 ===
Vaelen returned to the WOGA Classic, this time placing twelfth in the all-around. She then competed at the International GymSport and won the gold medal in the all-around. Then at the Belgian Championships, she won the bronze medal in the all-around behind Fien Enghels and Margaux Daveloose. She competed as a guest at the Dutch Championships and won the gold medal in the all-around. She then competed at the Heerenveen Friendly where the Belgian team finished second behind the Netherlands, and Vaelen placed fifth in the all-around. In August, she withdrew from the Junior European Championships due to a leg injury. She returned to competition in November at the Gymnova Cup and won the gold medal in the all-around. Her final meet of the season was the Top Gym Tournament where she won the gold medal in the all-around.

=== 2019 ===
Vaelen once again began her season at the WOGA Classic, and she finished sixth in the all-around. Her next competition was the City of Jesolo Trophy where the Belgian team won the bronze medal behind Russia and the United States, and she finished nineteenth in the all-around. She then won the gold medal in the all-around at the International GymSport. At the Belgian Championships, she won the bronze medal in the all-around. She then competed at the FIT Challenge and helped Belgium win the team gold medal.

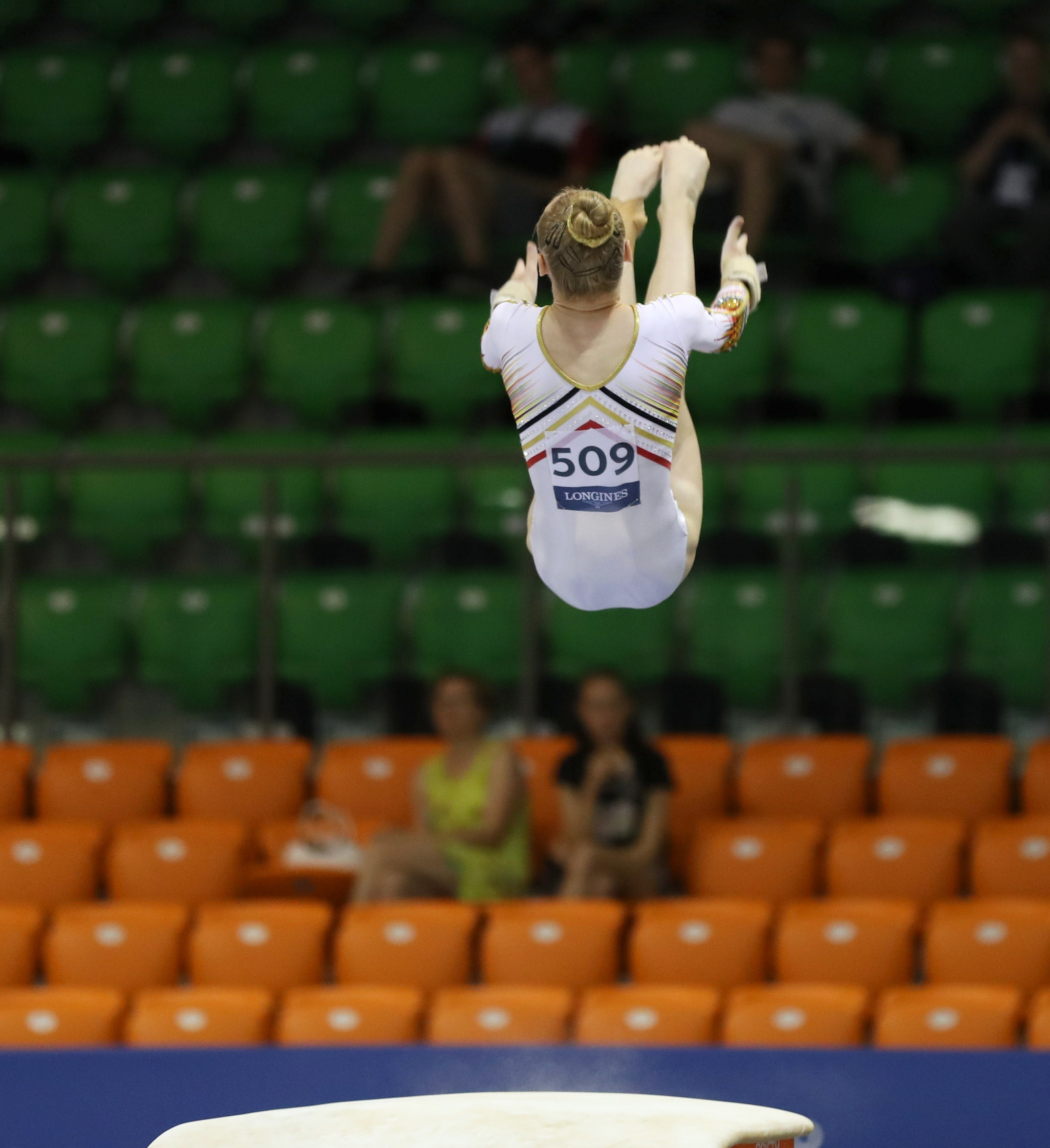
Vault

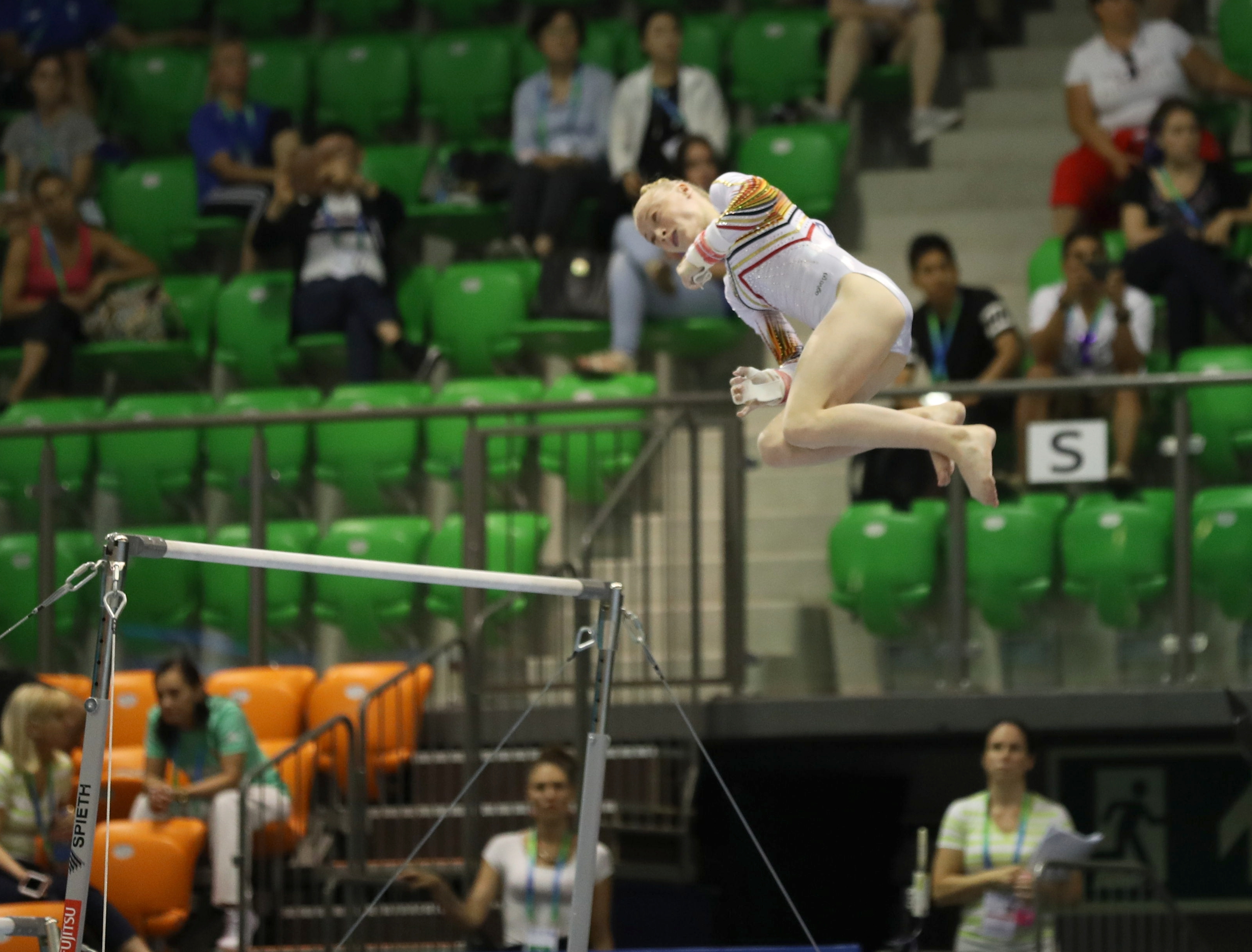
Uneven bars

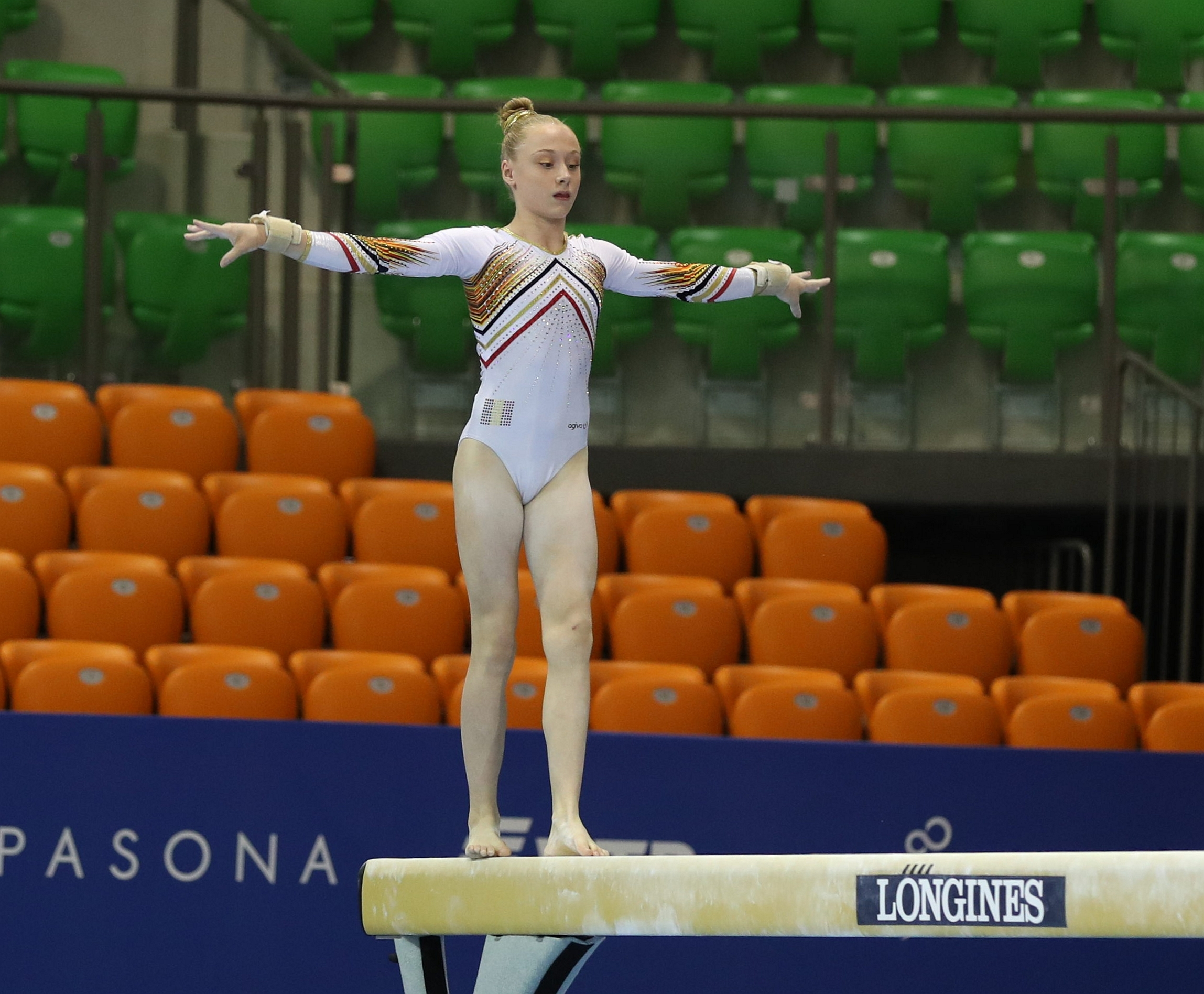
Balance beam

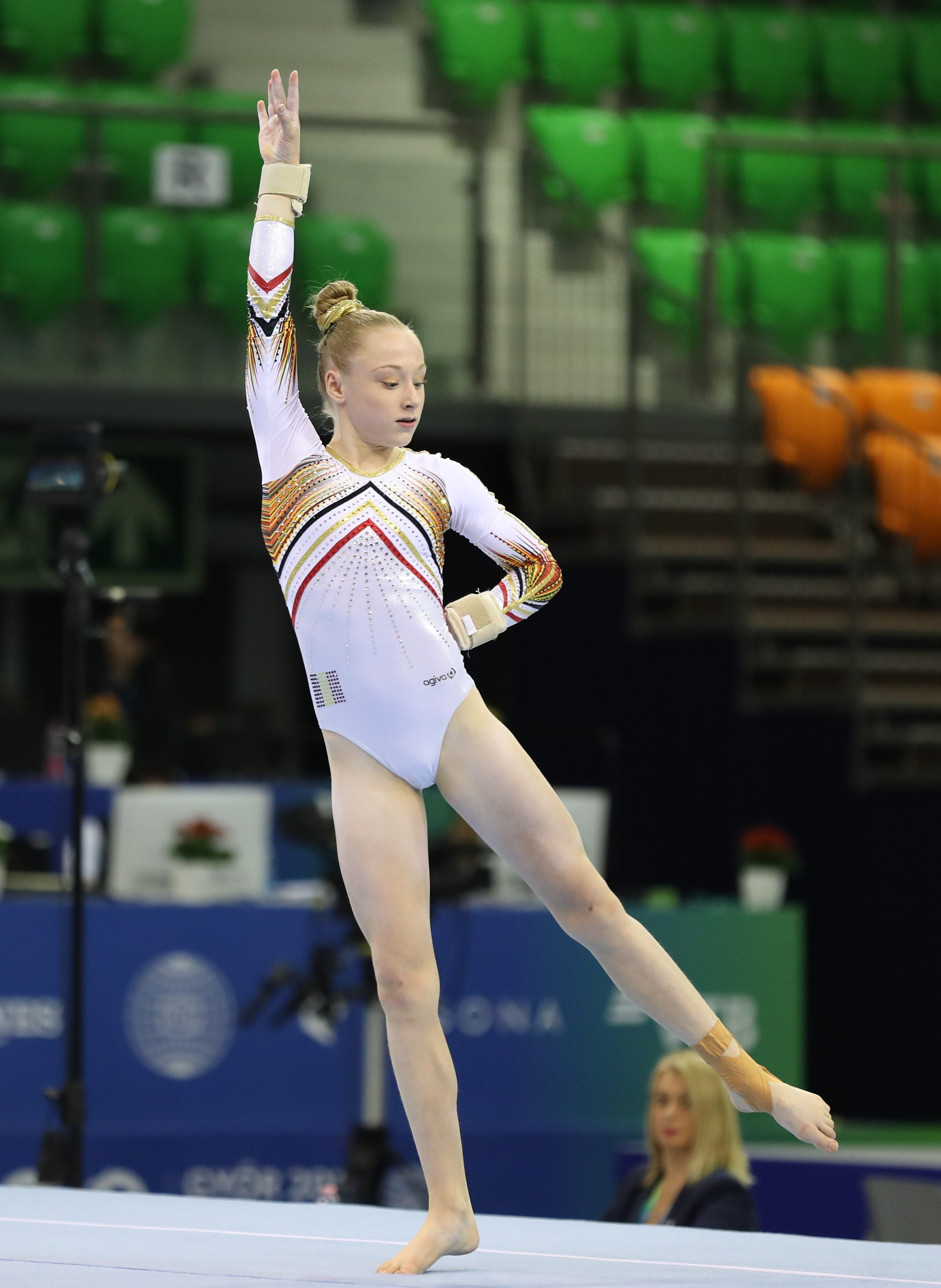
Floor exercise

Vaelen at the 2019 Junior World Championships

Vaelen competed at the inaugural 2019 Junior World Championships alongside Stacy Bertrandt and Noémie Louon, and they finished fifth in the team competition.

== Senior career ==
=== 2020-2021 ===
Vaelen made her senior debut at the 2020 L'International Gymnix in Montreal where she helped the Belgian team win the silver medal behind the United States. However, this was her only competition of the season due to the COVID-19 pandemic.

At the 2021 Osijek Challenge Cup, Vaelen won the bronze medal on the uneven bars behind Nina Derwael and Zsofia Kovacs. She then competed at the FIT Challenge and helped Belgium win the team silver medal behind France. She was selected to represent Belgium at the 2020 Summer Olympics alongside Nina Derwael, Maellyse Brassart, and Jutta Verkest. She competed on the vault, uneven bars, and floor exercise in the team final where the team finished eighth.

=== 2022 ===
In August, Vaelen competed at the European Championships in Munich, where she contributed to Belgium's fifth-place finish in the team final. Individually, she placed fifth in the all-around, and finished fourth in the vault final behind Zsófia Kovács, Asia D'Amato and Aline Friess with a total score of 13.583.

=== 2023 ===
In April, Lisa competed at the 2023 European Artistic Gymnastics Championships where she won the bronze medal on vault. She also ended up 4th in the All Around final, 7th with the team and on uneven bars. Few months later, she was diagnosed with mononucleosis and had to stop training for several months. She returned to training in March 2024.

=== 2025 ===
Vaelen returned to competition in March 2025, after not having competed since 2023 due to ongoing health issues. She competed at the DTB Pokal in Stuttgart, where she won the silver medal on both vault and floor exercise. In May, Vaelen competed at the European Championships in Leipzig, where she won the bronze medal on vault. Later that year, at the World Championships in Jakarta, Vaelen qualified for the vault final, where she placed fourth, and also placed as the second reserve for the floor final.

== Competitive history ==
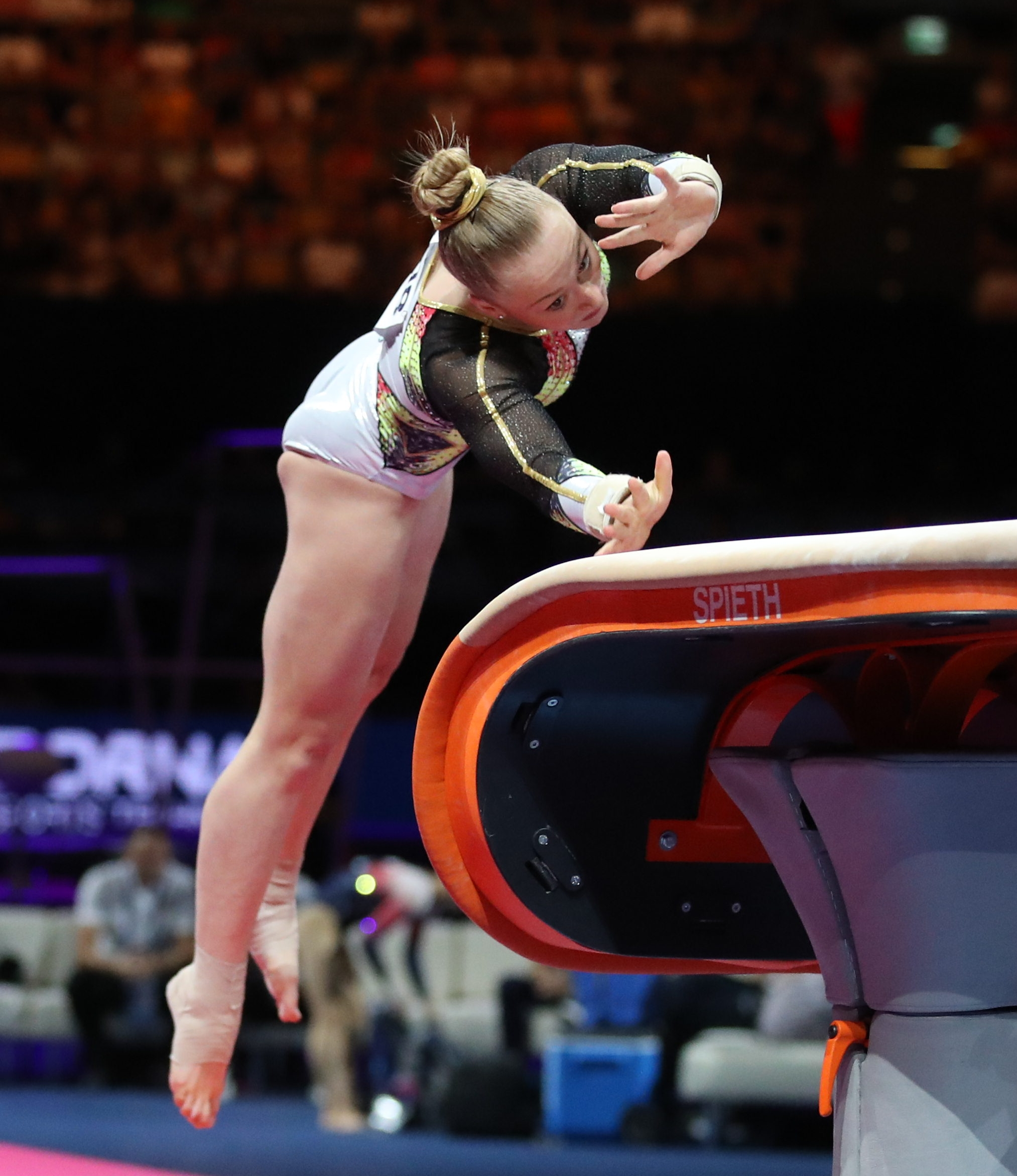
Vaelen vaulting at the 2022 European Championships

Competitive history of Lisa Vaelen at the junior level
Year	Event	Team	AA	VT	UB	BB	FX
2016	Belgian Championships		1st place, gold medalist(s)	1st place, gold medalist(s)	1st place, gold medalist(s)	1st place, gold medalist(s)	1st place, gold medalist(s)
2016	Gymnova Cup		1st place, gold medalist(s)				
2017	WOGA Classic	8	6				
2017	Belgian Championships		3rd place, bronze medalist(s)	2nd place, silver medalist(s)	2nd place, silver medalist(s)	2nd place, silver medalist(s)	3rd place, bronze medalist(s)
2017	Gymnova Cup		2nd place, silver medalist(s)	2nd place, silver medalist(s)		2nd place, silver medalist(s)	3rd place, bronze medalist(s)
2017	Top Gym	5	8	8	15		
2018	WOGA Classic		12				
2018	International GymSport		1st place, gold medalist(s)	1st place, gold medalist(s)		1st place, gold medalist(s)	1st place, gold medalist(s)
2018	Belgian Championships		3rd place, bronze medalist(s)	2nd place, silver medalist(s)		2nd place, silver medalist(s)	2nd place, silver medalist(s)
2018	Dutch Championships		1st place, gold medalist(s)	2nd place, silver medalist(s)		1st place, gold medalist(s)	1st place, gold medalist(s)
2018	Heerenveen Friendly	2nd place, silver medalist(s)	5				
2018	Gymnova Cup		1st place, gold medalist(s)	1st place, gold medalist(s)	4	2nd place, silver medalist(s)	2nd place, silver medalist(s)
2018	Top Gym		1st place, gold medalist(s)	3rd place, bronze medalist(s)			3rd place, bronze medalist(s)
2019	WOGA Classic		5	3rd place, bronze medalist(s)			
2019	City of Jesolo Trophy	3rd place, bronze medalist(s)	19				
2019	International GymSport		1st place, gold medalist(s)	1st place, gold medalist(s)	2nd place, silver medalist(s)	2nd place, silver medalist(s)	1st place, gold medalist(s)
2019	Belgian Championships		3rd place, bronze medalist(s)	2nd place, silver medalist(s)			2nd place, silver medalist(s)
2019	FIT Challenge	1st place, gold medalist(s)	7				
2019	Junior World Championships	5					

Competitive history of Lisa Vaelen at the senior level
Year	Event	Team	AA	VT	UB	BB	FX
2020	International Gymnix	2nd place, silver medalist(s)	6			7	8
2021	Osijek World Challenge Cup				3rd place, bronze medalist(s)	7	
2021	FIT Challenge	2nd place, silver medalist(s)	12				
2021	Olympic Games	8					
2022	City of Jesolo Trophy	5			4		
2022	Belgian Championships		1st place, gold medalist(s)	2nd place, silver medalist(s)	3rd place, bronze medalist(s)	1st place, gold medalist(s)	1st place, gold medalist(s)
2022	Ghent Friendly		2nd place, silver medalist(s)	2nd place, silver medalist(s)	3rd place, bronze medalist(s)	2nd place, silver medalist(s)	1st place, gold medalist(s)
2022	European Championships	5	5	4			
2022	Paris World Challenge Cup			4	3rd place, bronze medalist(s)		
2022	World Championships		11	6			
2023
2023	European Championships	7	4	3rd place, bronze medalist(s)	7		
2025	DTB Pokal Team Challenge	4		2nd place, silver medalist(s)			2nd place, silver medalist(s)
2025	Magglingen Friendly	2nd place, silver medalist(s)		1st place, gold medalist(s)	1st place, gold medalist(s)		2nd place, silver medalist(s)
2025	European Championships	10		3rd place, bronze medalist(s)			
2025	Paris World Challenge Cup			8			4
2025	World Championships	—N/a		4			R2
2026	City of Jesolo Trophy	9	29				
2026	European Championships	8	12	3rd place, bronze medalist(s)			
2026	Paris World Challenge Cup			1st place, gold medalist(s)			
2026	World Championships	16	20	R1			
