= Maellyse Brassart =

Belgian artistic gymnast

- Born: 22 June 2001 (age 25) Uccle, Belgium
- Height: 162 cm (5 ft 4 in)

Gymnastics career
- Discipline: Women's artistic gymnastics
- Country represented: Belgium; (2014–2024)
- Club: Gym Passion Herseaux
- Gym: Topsportschool
- Head coach: Ulla Koch
- Former coaches: Marjorie Heuls, Yves Kieffer
- Retired: 27 November 2024
Medal record
Representing Belgium
FIG World Cup
Event	1st	2nd	3rd
Apparatus World Cup	0	0	1

Maellyse Brassart (born 22 June 2001) is a Belgian retired artistic gymnast. She represented Belgium at the 2020 Summer Olympics and the 2024 Summer Olympics. She has competed at five World Championships.

== Personal life ==
Maellyse Brassart was born on 22 June 2001 in Uccle, and she began gymnastics when she was four years old. She is studying law at the Université Saint-Louis Bruxelles, and she speaks French and English as well as Dutch. She trains at Belgium's national training center in Ghent.

== Junior career ==
Brassart made her international debut at the 2014 Top Gym Tournament where she finished tenth in the all-around. In the event finals, she finished sixth on vault, ninth on the uneven bars, and seventh on the balance beam.

=== 2015 ===
At the Belgian Championships, Brassart finished fifth in the all-around, and she won the gold medal on vault and the bronze medal on floor exercise. She then competed at the Flanders International Team Challenge and helped the Belgian team win the silver medal behind Germany. She finished 17th in the all-around with a total score of 51.650. In September, she competed as a guest at the Romanian Championships and placed 18th in the all-around. She then competed at the Elite Gym Massilia in Marseille and finished 14th in the all-around. Her final competition of the season was the Top Gym Tournament where she finished 11th in the all-around. In the event finals, she finished 11th on vault, eighth on uneven bars and floor exercise, and 12th on balance beam.

=== 2016 ===
Brassart first competition of the season was the International Gymnix in Montreal and she placed 29th in the all-around, and the Belgian team finished eighth. She then competed at the Belgium Friendly and helped the Belgian team win the silver medal behind Romania. Then at the Belgian Championships, she won the silver medal in the junior all-around. She was then selected to compete at the Junior European Championships and helped the Belgian team finished eighth. Brassart qualified for the all-around final and finished 14th.

== Senior career ==
=== 2017 ===
Brassart made her senior debut at the Belgian Championships where she finished second in the all-around behind Rune Hermans. She then competed in the FIT Challenge where she once again won a silver medal in the all-around behind Hermans. In the team final, Belgium won the bronze medal behind Italy and France. She was selected to compete at the World Championships in Montreal where she placed 25th in the all-around during the qualification round.

=== 2018 ===
Brassart competed at the DTB Pokal Team Challenge in Stuttgart and helped the Belgian team win the gold medal. Then at the Belgian Championships, she finished fourth in the all-around and won the silver medal on vault and the bronze medal on the floor exercise. She then competed at the Heerenveen Friendly where the Belgian team finished fourth, and Brassart finished 13th in the all-around. She was selected to compete at the European Championships alongside Nina Derwael, Senna Deriks, and Axelle Klinckaert, and they finished third in the qualification round. However, the Belgian team withdrew from the team finals in order to preserve their health. Brassart qualified for the balance beam final where she finished seventh with a score of 12.266. Then at the Varsenare Friendly, the Belgian team won the gold medal, and Brassart finished fifth in the all-around and won the gold medal on the balance beam. She was then selected to compete at the World Championships alongside Nina Derwael, Axelle Klinckaert, Senna Deriks, and Rune Hermans, and they finished 11th during the qualification round.

=== 2019 ===
Brassart began her season at the International Gymnix where the Belgian team finished sixth, and she finished tenth in the all-around. In the event finals, she finished eighth on the uneven bars and sixth on the floor exercise. She then competed at the European Championships and qualified for the all-around final where she finished 12th with a total score of 51.166. At the FIT Challenge, she helped the Belgian team win the gold medal. Then at the Worms Friendly, the Belgian team won the silver medal behind Germany and Brassart placed tenth in the all-around. She was then selected to compete at the World Championships alongside Margaux Daveloose, Nina Derwael, Senna Deriks, and Jade Vansteenkiste and they finished tenth in the qualification round. This result earned Belgium a team spot at the 2020 Olympic Games.

=== 2020-2021 ===
In March 2020, Brassart competed at the International Gymnix in Montreal. The Belgian team won the silver medal behind the United States, and she finished 21st in the all-around. In the balance beam event final, she won the bronze medal behind American gymnast Faith Torrez and Australian gymnast Kate McDonald. After the 2020 Olympic Games were postponed for a year, Brassart took a break from training. She resumed her training in April and began preparing for the 2021 season.

Brassart competed at the 2021 FIT Challenge in Ghent and won the bronze medal in the all-around behind French gymnasts Mélanie de Jesus dos Santos and Aline Friess, and the Belgian team won the silver medal behind France. In the event finals, she finished seventh on the balance beam. She was selected to compete at the 2020 Olympic Games alongside Nina Derwael, Lisa Vaelen, and Jutta Verkest. During the team finals, she competed on the vault and the balance beam, and the team finished in eighth place. During the Olympics, a photo of Brassart and Derwael sitting in a split with tennis player Novak Djokovic went viral.

=== 2022 ===
Brassart competed with the Belgian team that finished fifth at the City of Jesolo Trophy. Individually, she finished seventh in the uneven bars final. She then finished second behind Lisa Vaelen at the Belgian Championships. In August, she competed at the European Championships in Munich, where she contributed to Belgium's fifth-place finish in the team final. She qualified for the all-around final at the World Championships and placed 15th.

=== 2023 ===
Brassart started the 2023 season at the DTB Pokal Team Challenge, helping Belgium win the team silver medal behind the United States. Individually, she won a silver medal in the balance beam final. Then at the European Championships, she finished fifth in the all-around final after qualifying for the final in last place. She competed with the Belgian team that placed 17th in the qualification round of the World Championships in Antwerp.

=== 2024 ===
Brassart began the season at the Cottbus World Cup where she won the bronze medal on the uneven bars- her first FIG World Cup medal. Then at the Doha World Cup, she finished seventh on the uneven bars. She then competed at the European Championships and placed tenth in the all-around. As the highest-placing all-arounder who had not previously qualified for the Olympics, she earned the continental quota for the 2024 Olympic Games. At those Games, she finished 37th in the all-around, placing 24th in the uneven bars, 69th in balance beam, and 49th in floor exercise.

== Competitive history ==
Year	Event	Team	AA	VT	UB	BB	FX
Junior
2014	Top Gym Tournament	5	10	6	9	7	
2015	Belgian Championships		5	1st place, gold medalist(s)			3rd place, bronze medalist(s)
2015	FIT Challenge	2nd place, silver medalist(s)	17				
2015	Romanian Championships		18				
2015	Elite Gym Massilia		14				
2015	Top Gym Tournament		11	5	8	12	8
2016	International Gymnix	8	29				
2016	Belgium Friendly	2nd place, silver medalist(s)	8				
2016	Belgian Championships		2nd place, silver medalist(s)	1st place, gold medalist(s)			3rd place, bronze medalist(s)
2016	European Championships	8	14				
Senior
2017	Belgian Championships		2nd place, silver medalist(s)	1st place, gold medalist(s)	3rd place, bronze medalist(s)	2nd place, silver medalist(s)	2nd place, silver medalist(s)
2017	FIT Challenge	6	2nd place, silver medalist(s)				
2017	World Championships		25				
2018	DTB Pokal Team Challenge	1st place, gold medalist(s)					
2018	Belgian Championships		4	2nd place, silver medalist(s)			3rd place, bronze medalist(s)
2018	Heerenveen Friendly	4	13				
2018	European Championships					7	
2018	World Championships	11					
2019	International Gymnix	6	10		8		6
2019	European Championships		12				
2019	FIT Challenge	3rd place, bronze medalist(s)	33				
2019	Worms Friendly	2nd place, silver medalist(s)	10				
2019	World Championships	R2					
2020	International Gymnix	2nd place, silver medalist(s)	21			3rd place, bronze medalist(s)	
2021	FIT Challenge	2nd place, silver medalist(s)	3rd place, bronze medalist(s)			7	
2021	Olympic Games	8					
2022	City of Jesolo Trophy	5	18		7		
2022	Belgian Championships		2nd place, silver medalist(s)				
2022	European Championships	5					
2022	World Championships		15				
2023	DTB Pokal Team Challenge	2nd place, silver medalist(s)				2nd place, silver medalist(s)	
2023	European Championships	7	5				
2023	World Championships	17					
2024	Cottbus World Cup				3rd place, bronze medalist(s)		
2024	Doha World Cup				7		
2024	European Championships		10				
2024	Olympic Games		37				
