= 2019 European Artistic Gymnastics Championships =

8th European Men's and Women's Artistic Gymnastics Individual Championships
- Venue: Netto Arena
- Location: Szczecin, Poland
- Start date: 10 April 2019
- End date: 14 April 2019
- Competitors: 257 from 59 nations

The 8th European Men's and Women's Artistic Gymnastics Individual Championships took place from 10 to 14 April 2019 at the Netto Arena in Szczecin, Poland. No team competition was held.

== Schedule ==
All times are in Eastern European Summer Time (UTC+03:00).

Wednesday, 10 April 2019

- 10:00 – 19:40 MAG Qualifying

Thursday, 11 April 2019

- 10:00 – 19:30 WAG Qualifying

Friday, 12 April 2019

- 13:00 – 15:45 MAG All-Around Final
- 17:30 – 19:30 WAG All-Around Final

Saturday, 13 April 2019

- 13:30 – 16:00 Apparatus Finals Day 1

Sunday, 14 April 2019

- 13:30 – 16:00 Apparatus Finals Day 2

== Medals summary ==
=== Medalists ===
Event	Gold	Silver	Bronze
Men
All-around	(Russia) Nikita Nagornyy	(Russia) Artur Dalaloyan	(Cyprus) Marios Georgiou
Floor	(Russia) Artur Dalaloyan	(Israel) Artem Dolgopyat	(Russia) Dmitrii Lankin
Pommel horse	(United Kingdom) Max Whitlock	(France) Cyril Tommasone	(Russia) Vladislav Polyashov
Rings	(Russia) Denis Ablyazin	(Italy) Marco Lodadio	(Armenia) Vahagn Davtyan
Vault	(Russia) Denis Ablyazin	(Israel) Andrey Medvedev	(Russia) Artur Dalaloyan
Parallel bars	(Russia) Nikita Nagornyy	(Ukraine) Petro Pakhniuk	(Turkey) Ferhat Arıcan
Horizontal bar	(Netherlands) Epke Zonderland	(Croatia) Tin Srbić	(Russia) Artur Dalaloyan
Women
All-around	(France) Mélanie de Jesus dos Santos	(United Kingdom) Ellie Downie	(Russia) Angelina Melnikova
Vault	(Russia) Maria Paseka	(France) Coline Devillard	(United Kingdom) Ellie Downie
Uneven bars	(Russia) Anastasia Ilyankova	(Russia) Angelina Melnikova	(Italy) Alice D'Amato
Balance beam	(United Kingdom) Alice Kinsella	(France) Mélanie de Jesus dos Santos	(France) Lorette Charpy
Floor	(France) Mélanie de Jesus dos Santos	(Netherlands) Eythora Thorsdottir	(Russia) Angelina Melnikova

=== Medal standings ===
==== Overall ====
Rank	Nation	Gold	Silver	Bronze	Total
1	Russia (RUS)	7	2	6	15
2	France (FRA)	2	3	1	6
3	Great Britain (GBR)	2	1	1	4
4	Netherlands (NED)	1	1	0	2
5	Israel (ISR)	0	2	0	2
6	Italy (ITA)	0	1	1	2
7	Croatia (CRO)	0	1	0	1
7	Ukraine (UKR)	0	1	0	1
9	Armenia (ARM)	0	0	1	1
9	Cyprus (CYP)	0	0	1	1
9	Turkey (TUR)	0	0	1	1
Totals (11 entries)		12	12	12	36

==== Men ====
Rank	Nation	Gold	Silver	Bronze	Total
1	Russia (RUS)	5	1	4	10
2	Great Britain (GBR)	1	0	0	1
2	Netherlands (NED)	1	0	0	1
4	Israel (ISR)	0	2	0	2
5	Croatia (CRO)	0	1	0	1
5	France (FRA)	0	1	0	1
5	Italy (ITA)	0	1	0	1
5	Ukraine (UKR)	0	1	0	1
9	Armenia (ARM)	0	0	1	1
9	Cyprus (CYP)	0	0	1	1
9	Turkey (TUR)	0	0	1	1
Totals (11 entries)		7	7	7	21

==== Women ====
Rank	Nation	Gold	Silver	Bronze	Total
1	France (FRA)	2	2	1	5
2	Russia (RUS)	2	1	2	5
3	Great Britain (GBR)	1	1	1	3
4	Netherlands (NED)	0	1	0	1
5	Italy (ITA)	0	0	1	1
Totals (5 entries)		5	5	5	15

== Men's results ==
=== Individual all-around ===
Andrey Likhavitski of Belarus and Israel's Alexander Shatilov withdrew and were replaced by reserves Yevgen Yudenkov of Ukraine and Joel Plata of Spain.

Oldest and youngest competitors

	Name	Country	Date of birth	Age
Youngest	Nicolò Mozzato	Italy	March 13, 2000	19 years and 30 days
Oldest	Petro Pakniuk	Ukraine	November 26, 1991	27 years, 4 months and 17 days

Rank	Gymnast	Floor (gymnastics)	Pommel horse	Rings (gymnastics)	Vault (gymnastics)	Parallel bars	Horizontal bar	Total
1st place, gold medalist(s)	(Russia) Nikita Nagornyy	14.766	14.333	14.733	14.900	15.400	14.533	88.665
2nd place, silver medalist(s)	(Russia) Artur Dalaloyan	14.800	13.966	14.600	14.533	15.200	14.733	87.832
3rd place, bronze medalist(s)	(Cyprus) Marios Georgiou	13.833	14.166	13.500	14.000	14.733	14.166	84.398
4	(United Kingdom) Joe Fraser	13.866	13.933	13.833	14.200	14.833	13.700	84.365
5	(Turkey) Ahmet Önder	13.933	12.833	14.000	14.600	15.000	13.933	84.299
6	(Ukraine) Petro Pakhniuk	13.233	13.700	13.433	14.433	14.933	13.566	83.298
7	(United Kingdom) James Hall	12.766	13.833	13.833	14.266	14.466	13.933	83.097
8	(Armenia) Artur Davtyan	13.566	13.666	14.166	14.633	13.700	13.366	83.097
9	(France) Loris Frasca	13.966	13.366	13.333	15.033	13.566	13.333	82.597
10	(Turkey) Ferhat Arıcan	13.766	14.100	12.633	14.333	14.633	12.800	82.265
11	(Germany) Andreas Toba	13.266	13.466	13.833	14.433	13.700	13.533	82.231
12	(Netherlands) Casimir Schmidt	14.133	13.366	13.633	14.433	13.600	12.933	82.098
13	(Italy) Nicolò Mozzato	14.000	12.966	12.800	14.300	13.600	13.933	81.599
14	(Switzerland) Eddy Yusof	13.800	12.233	13.533	13.000	14.633	13.833	81.032
15	(Italy) Ludovico Edalli	13.666	13.300	12.400	13.400	14.366	13.733	80.865
16	(Lithuania) Robert Tvorogal	13.533	12.900	12.200	13.833	14.166	13.866	80.498
17	(Switzerland) Christian Baumann	13.600	11.666	14.100	13.733	13.366	13.633	80.098
18	(Spain) Joel Plata	13.766	11.833	13.366	13.566	13.566	13.800	79.897
19	(Ukraine) Yevhen Yudenkov	13.200	13.266	13.100	13.800	13.533	12.900	79.799
20	(Finland) Oskar Kirmes	13.900	12.966	12.733	13.800	13.700	12.100	79.199
21	(Azerbaijan) İvan Tixonov	13.700	12.633	13.466	14.333	13.000	11.533	78.665
22	(Belgium) Jimmy Verbaeys	13.133	12.300	12.700	13.766	14.000	12.466	78.365
23	(Finland) Elias Koski	13.200	12.200	13.000	13.500	12.900	13.333	78.133
24	(France) Paul Degouy	13.166	9.900	12.833	13.100	12.900	13.633	75.532

=== Floor ===
Great Britain's Dominick Cunningham withdrew due to his injury in qualifications. He was replaced by first reserve Nicola Bartolini of Italy.

Oldest and youngest competitors

	Name	Country	Date of birth	Age
Youngest	Artem Dolgopyat	Israel	June 16, 1997	21 years, 9 months and 28 days
Oldest	Alexander Shatilov	Israel	March 22, 1987	32 years and 22 days

Position	Gymnast	D Score	E Score	Penalty	Total
1st place, gold medalist(s)	(Russia) Artur Dalaloyan	6.200	8.900		15.100
2nd place, silver medalist(s)	(Israel) Artem Dolgopyat	6.400	8.600	0.100	14.900
3rd place, bronze medalist(s)	(Russia) Dmitrii Lankin	6.500	8.400	0.100	14.800
4	(Switzerland) Benjamin Gischard	6.000	8.500		14.500
5	(Israel) Alexander Shatilov	5.800	8.666		14.466
6	(Spain) Rayderley Zapata	6.100	8.366		14.466
7	(Turkey) Ahmet Önder	5.900	8.200		14.100
8	(Italy) Nicola Bartolini	5.800	8.266		14.066

=== Pommel horse ===
Oldest and youngest competitors

	Name	Country	Date of birth	Age
Youngest	Marios Georgiou	Cyprus	November 10, 1997	21 years, 5 months and 3 days
Oldest	Cyril Tommasone	France	July 4, 1987	31 years, 9 months and 9 days

Position	Gymnast	D Score	E Score	Penalty	Total
1st place, gold medalist(s)	(United Kingdom) Max Whitlock	6.900	8.633		15.533
2nd place, silver medalist(s)	(France) Cyril Tommasone	6.200	8.600		14.800
3rd place, bronze medalist(s)	(Russia) Vladislav Polyashov	6.000	8.600		14.600
4	(Russia) Nikita Nagornyy	5.900	8.566		14.466
5	(Turkey) Ferhat Arıcan	5.600	8.266		13.866
6	(United Kingdom) Brinn Bevan	5.500	7.900		13.400
7	(Ukraine) Oleg Verniaiev	6.200	7.000		13.200
8	(Cyprus) Marios Georgiou	5.600	7.400		13.000

=== Rings ===
Oldest and youngest competitors

	Name	Country	Date of birth	Age
Youngest	Nikita Nagornyy	Russia	February 12, 1997	22 years, 2 months and 1 day
Oldest	Vahagn Davtyan	Armenia	August 19, 1988	30 years, 7 months and 25 days

Position	Gymnast	D Score	E Score	Penalty	Total
1st place, gold medalist(s)	(Russia) Denis Ablyazin	6.100	8.866		14.966
2nd place, silver medalist(s)	(Italy) Marco Lodadio	6.300	8.666		14.966
3rd place, bronze medalist(s)	(Armenia) Vahagn Davtyan	6.100	8.833		14.933
4	(Russia) Nikita Nagornyy	6.000	8.900		14.900
5	(United Kingdom) Courtney Tulloch	6.500	8.266		14.766
6	(France) Samir Aït Saïd	6.100	8.633		14.733
7	(Armenia) Artur Tovmasyan	6.100	8.600		14.700
8	(Ukraine) Igor Radivilov	6.300	7.633		13.933

=== Vault ===
Oldest and youngest competitors

	Name	Country	Date of birth	Age
Youngest	Yahor Sharamkou	Belarus	March 4, 1999	20 years, 1 month and 10 days
Oldest	Andrey Medvedev	Israel	April 6, 1990	29 years and 8 days

Rank	Gymnast	D Score	E Score	Pen.	Score 1	D Score	E Score	Pen.	Score 2	Total
1st place, gold medalist(s)	(Russia) Denis Ablyazin	5.600	9.400		15.000	5.600	9.300		14.900	14.950
2nd place, silver medalist(s)	(Israel) Andrey Medvedev	5.600	8.733		14.333	5.600	9.466		15.066	14.699
3rd place, bronze medalist(s)	(Russia) Artur Dalaloyan	5.600	9.333		14.933	6.000	8.133		14.133	14.533
4	(Belarus) Yahor Sharamkou	5.200	9.066		14.266	5.600	9.166		14.766	14.516
5	(Switzerland) Benjamin Gischard	5.200	9.300		14.500	5.200	9.266		14.466	14.483
6	(Italy) Nicola Bartolini	5.200	9.466		14.666	4.800	9.533	0.100	14.233	14.449
7	(Ukraine) Igor Radivilov	5.600	9.400		15.000	5.600	8.166	0.300	13.466	14.233
8	(United Kingdom) Courtney Tulloch	5.600	7.933	0.300	13.233	5.600	7.933		13.533	13.383

=== Parallel bars ===
Oldest and youngest competitors

	Name	Country	Date of birth	Age
Youngest	Brinn Bevan	Great Britain	June 16, 1997	21 years, 9 months and 29 days
Oldest	Petro Pakhniuk	Ukraine	November 26, 1991	27 years, 4 months and 19 days

Position	Gymnast	D Score	E Score	Penalty	Total
1st place, gold medalist(s)	(Russia) Nikita Nagornyy	6.400	9.066		15.466
2nd place, silver medalist(s)	(Ukraine) Petro Pakhniuk	6.200	9.133		15.333
3rd place, bronze medalist(s)	(Turkey) Ferhat Arıcan	6.300	8.733		15.033
4	(Russia) Artur Dalaloyan	6.400	8.566		14.966
5	(Turkey) Ahmet Önder	6.200	8.633		14.833
6	(Switzerland) Christian Baumann	6.100	8.466		14.566
7	(United Kingdom) Brinn Bevan	5.900	8.633		14.533
8	(Ukraine) Oleg Verniaiev	5.400	7.733		13.133

=== Horizontal bar ===
Great Britain's James Hall was unable to finish his routine due to a shoulder injury from a fall.

Oldest and youngest competitors

	Name	Country	Date of birth	Age
Youngest	Ivan Stretovich	Russia	October 6, 1996	22 years, 6 months and 8 days
Oldest	Epke Zonderland	Netherlands	April 16, 1986	32 years, 11 months and 29 days

Position	Gymnast	D Score	E Score	Penalty	Total
1st place, gold medalist(s)	(Netherlands) Epke Zonderland	6.800	8.466		15.266
2nd place, silver medalist(s)	(Croatia) Tin Srbić	6.200	8.700		14.900
3rd place, bronze medalist(s)	(Russia) Artur Dalaloyan	6.100	8.700		14.800
4	(Italy) Carlo Macchini	5.700	8.366		14.066
5	(Italy) Ludovico Edalli	5.600	7.833		13.433
6	(Russia) Ivan Stretovich	5.700	6.833		12.533
7	(Turkey) Ahmet Önder	5.200	7.266		12.466
8	(United Kingdom) James Hall	0.700	8.800	8.000	1.500

== Women's results ==
=== Individual all-around ===
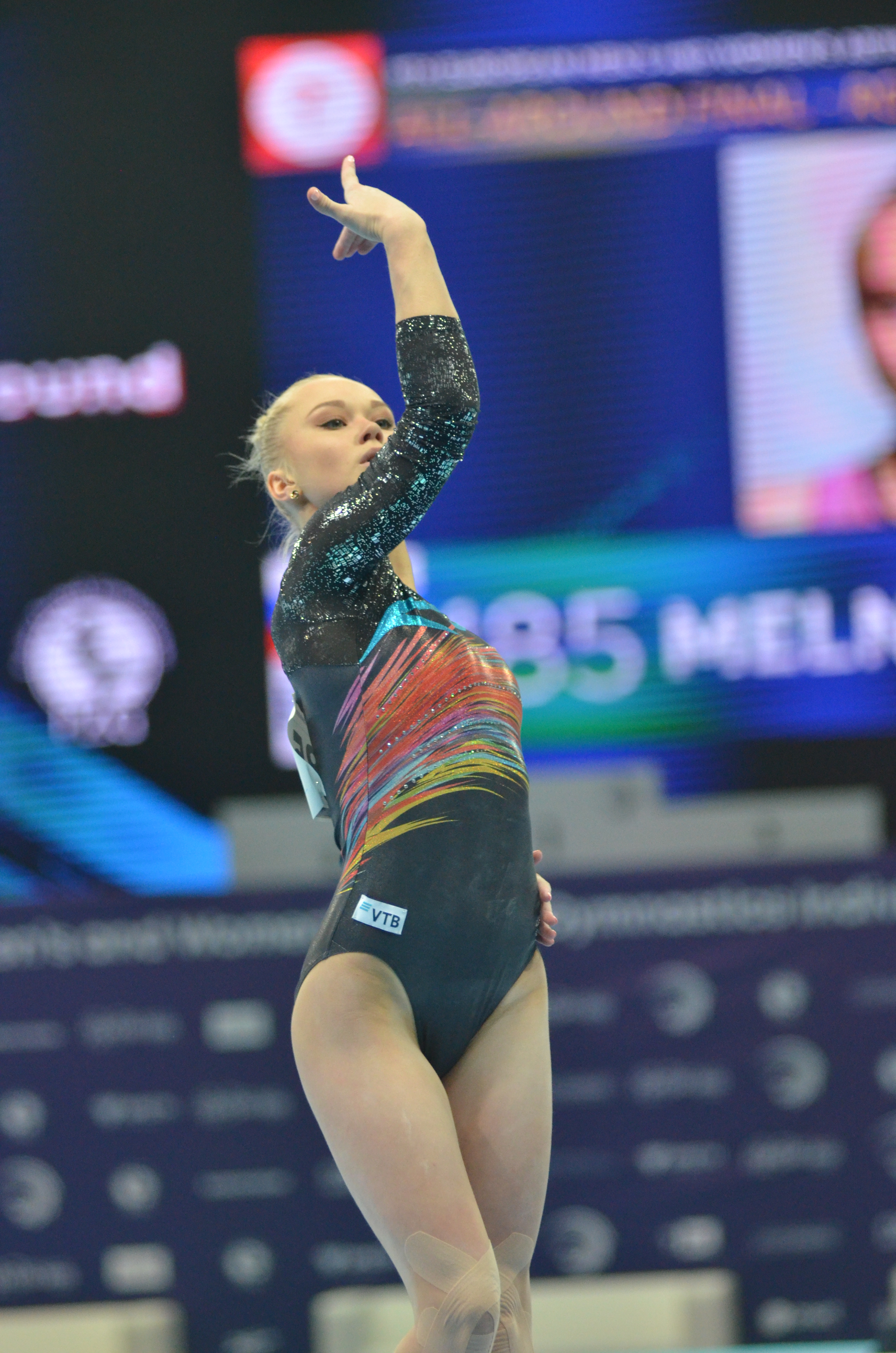
Angelina Melnikova during the all-around final

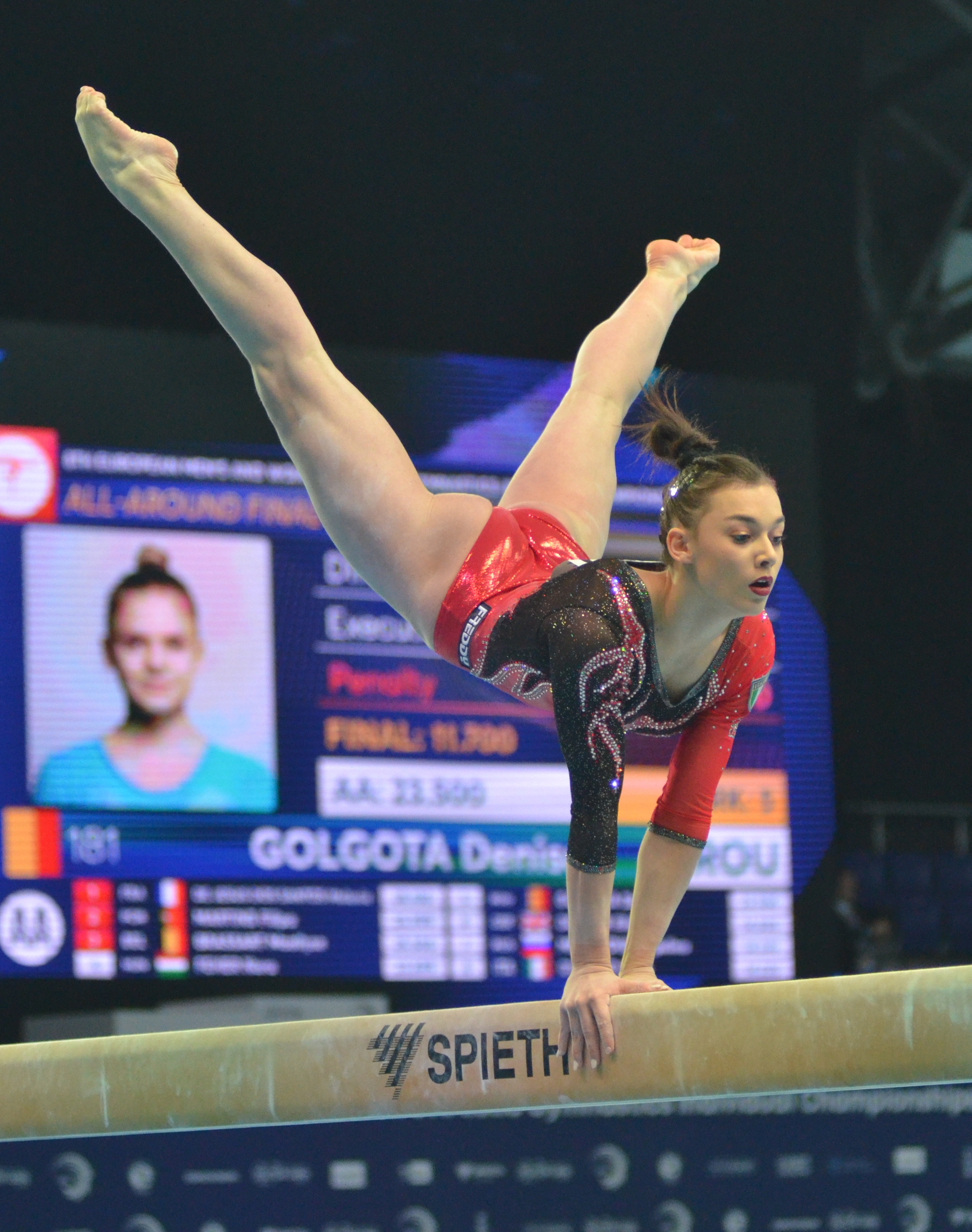
Giorgia Villa during the all-around final

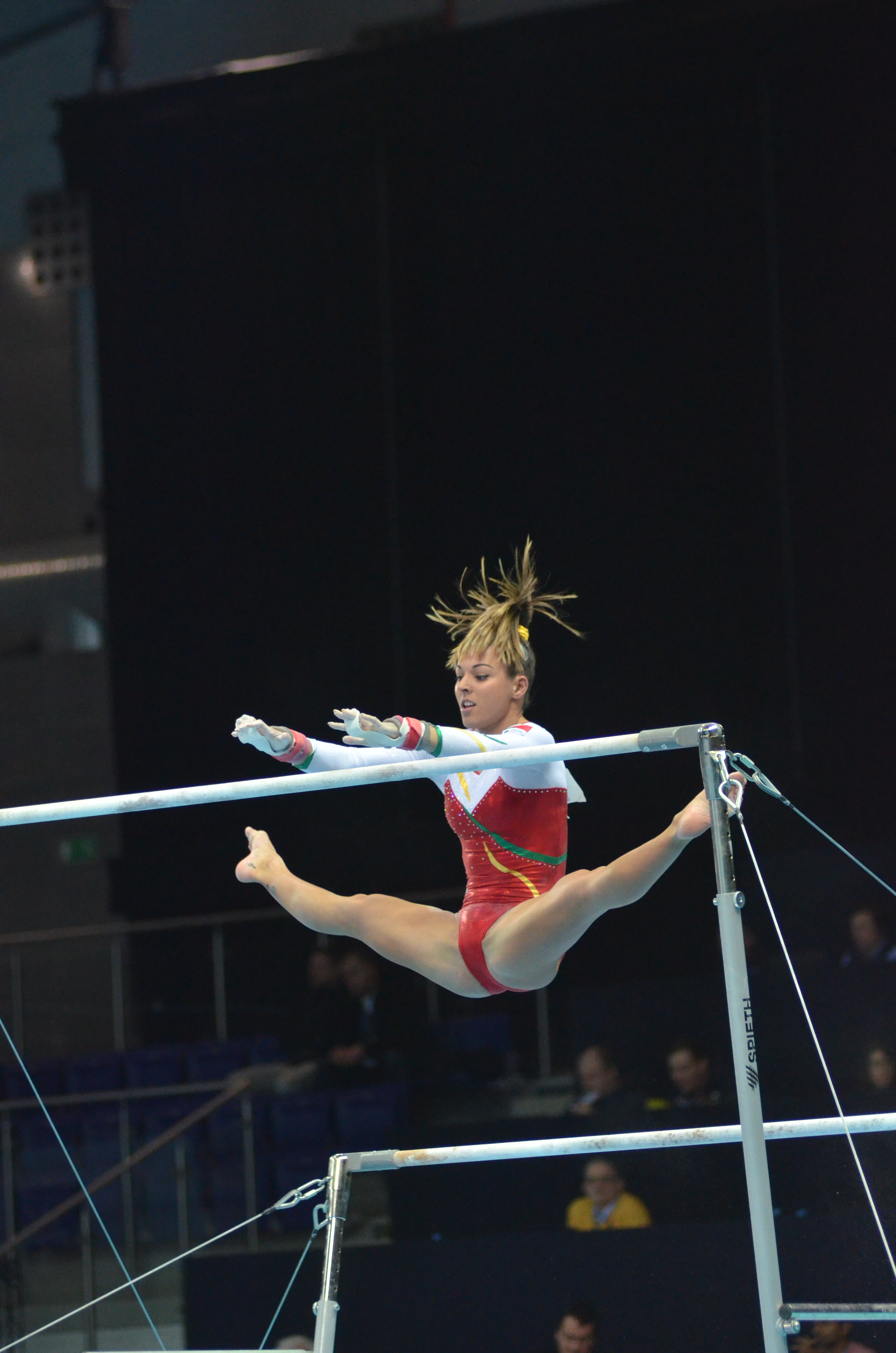
Ana Filipa Martins during the all-around final

Oldest and youngest competitors

	Name	Country	Date of birth	Age
Youngest	Anastasiia Bachynska	Ukraine	August 4, 2003	15 years, 8 months and 8 days
Oldest	Cintia Rodriguez	Spain	November 16, 1994	24 years, 4 months and 27 days

Rank	Gymnast	Vault (gymnastics)	Uneven bars	Balance beam	Floor (gymnastics)	Total
1st place, gold medalist(s)	(France) Mélanie de Jesus dos Santos	14.100	14.000	13.733	13.600	55.433
2nd place, silver medalist(s)	(United Kingdom) Ellie Downie	14.500	14.066	13.333	13.466	55.365
3rd place, bronze medalist(s)	(Russia) Angelina Melnikova	14.333	14.266	12.900	13.566	55.065
4	(Italy) Alice D'Amato	14.233	14.200	12.300	12.500	53.233
5	(Ukraine) Anastasiia Bachynska	13.600	13.300	13.533	12.700	53.133
6	(Italy) Giorgia Villa	14.300	13.533	12.633	12.533	52.999
7	(Ukraine) Diana Varinska	13.400	13.833	12.866	12.900	52.999
8	(France) Lorette Charpy	13.600	13.933	12.500	12.400	52.433
9	(Russia) Angelina Simakova	13.300	13.866	13.466	10.833	51.465
10	(Portugal) Ana Filipa Martins	13.433	12.666	12.733	12.566	51.398
11	(Netherlands) Eythora Thorsdottir	13.466	11.833	12.666	13.400	51.365
12	(Belgium) Maellyse Brassart	13.400	12.766	12.900	12.100	51.166
13	(Netherlands) Tisha Volleman	14.000	12.900	11.566	12.433	50.899
14	(Sweden) Jessica Castles	13.400	11.633	12.833	12.866	50.732
15	(United Kingdom) Alice Kinsella	14.200	12.600	13.033	10.833	50.666
16	(Spain) Laura Bechdejú	13.266	13.100	12.033	12.200	50.599
17	(Romania) Denisa Golgotă	14.266	11.800	11.700	12.733	50.499
18	(Switzerland) Ilaria Käslin	13.366	12.000	13.200	11.933	50.499
19	(Hungary) Nóra Fehér	12.933	13.133	11.333	12.366	49.765
20	(Belgium) Jade Vansteenkiste	13.366	11.966	10.933	12.533	48.798
21	(Spain) Cintia Rodriguez	13.300	11.100	12.500	11.866	48.766
22	(Czech Republic) Aneta Holasová	13.600	12.166	10.800	12.166	48.732
23	(Azerbaijan) Marina Nekrasova	13.500	10.166	12.666	12.133	48.465
24	(Germany) Lisa Zimmermann	13.300	12.366	10.400	11.733	47.799

=== Vault ===
Oldest and youngest competitors

	Name	Country	Date of birth	Age
Youngest	Asia D'Amato	Italy	February 7, 2003	16 years, 2 months and 6 days
Oldest	Teja Belak	Slovenia	April 22, 1994	24 years, 11 months and 22 days

Rank	Gymnast	D Score	E Score	Pen.	Score 1	D Score	E Score	Pen.	Score 2	Total
1st place, gold medalist(s)	(Russia) Maria Paseka	6.000	8.500	0.300	14.200	5.800	9.033		14.833	14.516
2nd place, silver medalist(s)	(France) Coline Devillard	5.800	9.000		14.800	5.400	8.800	0.100	14.100	14.450
3rd place, bronze medalist(s)	(United Kingdom) Ellie Downie	5.400	9.000		14.400	5.200	9.033		14.233	14.316
4	(Italy) Asia D'Amato	5.400	8.900		14.300	5.200	8.966		14.166	14.233
5	(Russia) Angelina Melnikova	5.400	8.933		14.333	5.200	8.733		13.933	14.133
6	(Romania) Denisa Golgotă	5.400	9.100		14.500	4.800	8.933		13.733	14.116
7	(Hungary) Sára Péter	5.400	9.133		14.533	4.600	9.000		13.600	14.066
8	(Slovenia) Teja Belak	5.400	8.533		13.933	5.000	7.566		12.566	13.249

=== Uneven bars ===
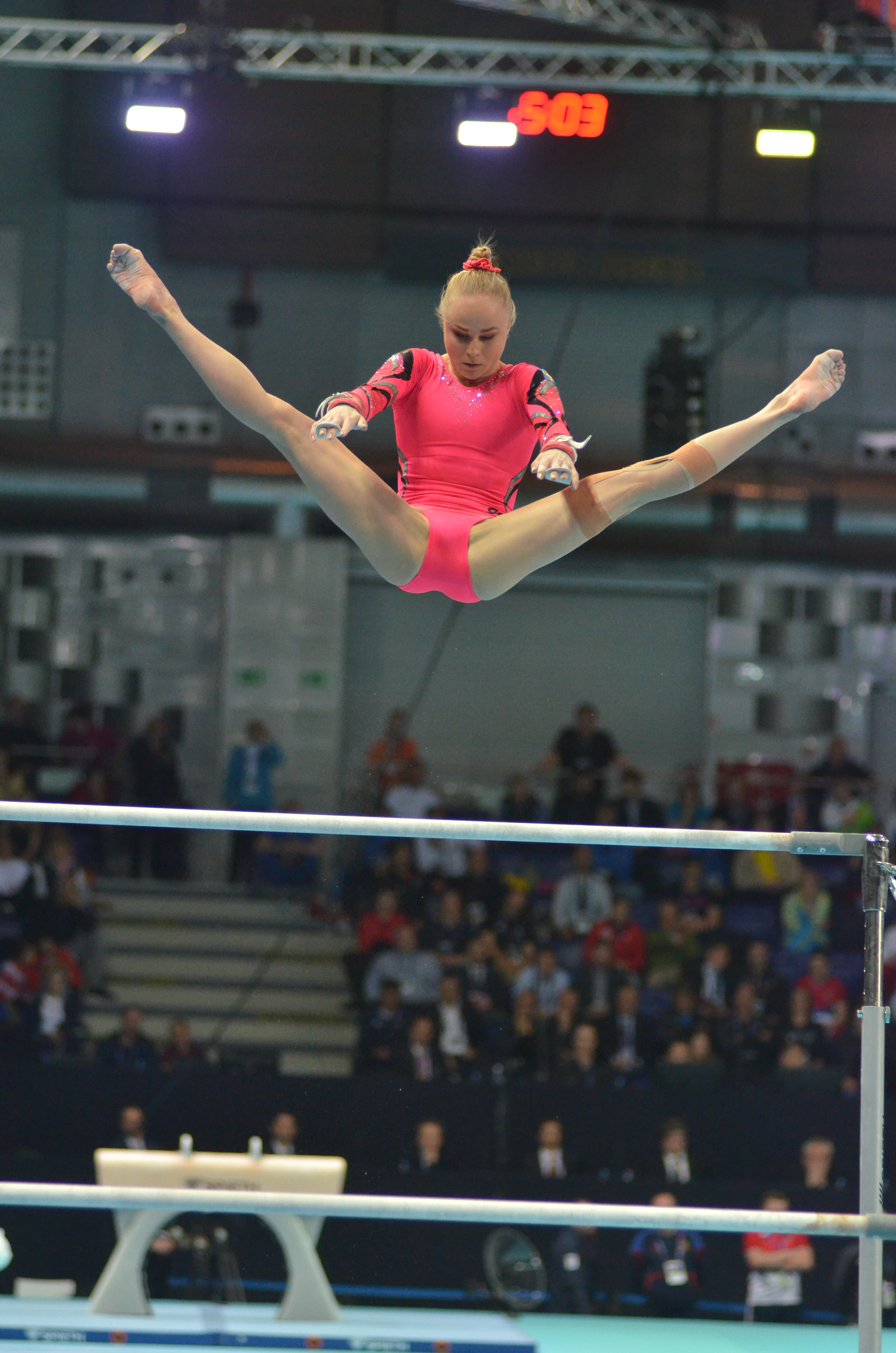
Jonna Adlerteg during the uneven bars final

Oldest and youngest competitors

	Name	Country	Date of birth	Age
Youngest	Anastasiya Alistratava	Belarus	October 16, 2003	15 years, 5 months and 28 days
Oldest	Jonna Adlerteg	Sweden	June 6, 1995	23 years, 10 months and 7 days

Position	Gymnast	D Score	E Score	Penalty	Total
1st place, gold medalist(s)	(Russia) Anastasia Ilyankova	6.300	8.533		14.833
2nd place, silver medalist(s)	(Russia) Angelina Melnikova	6.100	8.433		14.533
3rd place, bronze medalist(s)	(Italy) Alice D'Amato	6.000	8.400		14.400
4	(Belarus) Anastasiya Alistratava	5.800	8.566		14.366
5	(Sweden) Jonna Adlerteg	6.000	8.300		14.300
6	(France) Lorette Charpy	5.700	8.400		14.100
7	(France) Mélanie de Jesus dos Santos	5.600	8.166		13.766
8	(Netherlands) Sanna Veerman	5.500	6.866		12.366

=== Balance beam ===
Oldest and youngest competitors

	Name	Country	Date of birth	Age
Youngest	Anastasiia Bachynska	Ukraine	August 4, 2003	15 years, 8 months and 10 days
Oldest	Ilaria Käslin	Switzerland	December 8, 1997	21 years, 4 months and 6 days

Position	Gymnast	D Score	E Score	Penalty	Total
1st place, gold medalist(s)	(United Kingdom) Alice Kinsella	5.500	8.066		13.566
2nd place, silver medalist(s)	(France) Mélanie de Jesus dos Santos	5.500	7.966		13.466
3rd place, bronze medalist(s)	(France) Lorette Charpy	5.400	7.500		12.900
4	(Switzerland) Ilaria Käslin	4.900	7.933		12.833
5	(Romania) Denisa Golgotă	5.400	6.766		12.166
6	(Germany) Pauline Schäfer	5.300	6.500	0.100	11.700
7	(Ukraine) Anastasiia Bachynska	4.900	6.733		11.633
8	(Italy) Giorgia Villa	5.300	5.900		11.200

=== Floor ===
Oldest and youngest competitors

	Name	Country	Date of birth	Age
Youngest	Jade Vansteenkiste	Belgium	July 17, 2003	15 years, 8 months and 28 days
Oldest	Claudia Fragapane	Great Britain	October 24, 1997	21 years, 5 months and 21 days

Position	Gymnast	D Score	E Score	Penalty	Total
1st place, gold medalist(s)	(France) Mélanie de Jesus dos Santos	5.700	8.233	0.100	13.833
2nd place, silver medalist(s)	(Netherlands) Eythora Thorsdottir	5.500	8.166		13.666
3rd place, bronze medalist(s)	(Russia) Angelina Melnikova	5.900	7.866	0.300	13.466
4	(Romania) Denisa Golgotă	5.700	7.766	0.100	13.366
5	(United Kingdom) Claudia Fragapane	5.700	7.666		13.366
6	(Belgium) Jade Vansteenkiste	5.200	8.033		13.233
7	(United Kingdom) Alice Kinsella	5.100	8.000		13.100
8	(France) Marine Boyer	5.000	7.933		12.933

== Qualification ==
=== Men's results ===
==== Individual all-around ====
Rank	Gymnast	Floor (gymnastics)	Pommel horse	Rings (gymnastics)	Vault (gymnastics)	Parallel bars	Horizontal bar	Total	Qual.
1	(Russia) Artur Dalaloyan	14.966	14.066	14.566	14.800	14.866	14.666	87.930	Q
2	(Russia) Nikita Nagornyy	14.566	14.100	14.600	14.833	15.133	13.933	87.165	Q
3	(Turkey) Ahmet Önder	14.500	13.466	13.200	14.600	14.866	14.166	84.798	Q
4	(Cyprus) Marios Georgiou	14.100	14.100	12.800	14.300	14.266	14.066	83.632	Q
5	(Turkey) Ferhat Arıcan	13.500	14.133	12.966	14.266	15.033	13.400	83.298	Q
6	(United Kingdom) Joe Fraser	14.000	13.533	13.666	14.166	14.066	13.666	83.097	Q
7	(United Kingdom) James Hall	12.966	14.133	13.600	14.366	13.533	14.200	82.798	Q
8	(Armenia) Artur Davtyan	13.733	13.666	14.000	14.600	13.633	12.833	82.465	Q
9	(France) Loris Frasca	14.066	13.566	13.033	14.633	13.600	13.400	82.298	Q
10	(Israel) Alexander Shatilov	14.566	13.466	12.900	14.000	13.633	13.700	82.265	Q
11	(Germany) Andreas Toba	13.233	13.466	13.900	14.400	13.933	13.333	82.265	Q
12	(Switzerland) Eddy Yusof	13.966	11.866	13.666	14.700	13.666	13.833	81.697	Q
13	(Switzerland) Christian Baumann	13.700	11.966	13.466	13.766	14.666	14.133	81.697	Q
14	(Italy) Nicolò Mozzato	14.000	12.866	12.666	14.300	13.600	14.133	81.565	Q
15	(Italy) Ludovico Edalli	13.466	13.366	13.466	13.333	13.633	14.166	81.430	Q
16	(Belarus) Andrey Likhavitski	13.000	13.866	12.200	13.600	14.366	13.733	80.765	Q
17	(Netherlands) Casimir Schmidt	14.233	12.333	13.166	14.400	13.366	12.933	80.431	Q
18	(Finland) Oskar Kirmes	13.500	13.166	12.633	14.000	13.666	13.233	80.198	Q
19	(Belgium) Jimmy Verbaeys	13.566	13.300	12.766	13.633	13.733	13.200	80.198	Q
20	(Italy) Nicola Bartolini	14.466	13.333	12.466	14.433	12.500	12.700	79.898	–
21	(Ukraine) Petro Pakhniuk	12.733	13.100	12.366	12.833	15.000	13.666	79.698	Q
22	(Lithuania) Robert Tvorogal	13.633	12.800	12.800	13.833	12.633	13.33	79.632	Q
23	(Azerbaijan) Ivan Tikhonov	14.033	11.133	13.333	14.333	13.233	13.133	79.198	Q
24	(Finland) Elias Koski	13.733	13.266	12.933	13.633	12.233	13.133	78.931	Q
25	(France) Paul Degouy	13.833	11.600	12.533	13.333	14.066	13.500	78.865	Q
26	(Ukraine) Yevgen Yudenkov	13.133	13.266	12.633	13.866	13.000	12.900	78.798	R1
27	(Spain) Joel Plata	13.733	11.500	13.233	13.500	13.100	13.533	78.599	R2
28	(Belarus) Raman Antropau	13.400	12.700	12.533	13.533	13.466	12.733	78.365	R3

==== Floor ====
Rank	Gymnast	D Score	E Score	Pen.	Total	Qual.
1	(Israel) Artem Dolgopyat	6.400	8.966		15.366	Q
2	(Russia) Artur Dalaloyan	6.300	8.666		14.966	Q
3	(Switzerland) Benjamin Gischard	6.000	8.800		14.800	Q
4	(United Kingdom) Dominick Cunningham	6.100	8.600		14.700	Q
4	(Spain) Rayderley Zapata	6.100	8.600		14.700	Q
6	(Russia) Dmitrii Lankin	6.500	8.100		14.600	Q
7	(Israel) Alexander Shatilov	5.900	8.666		14.566	Q
8	(Russia) Nikita Nagornyy	6.600	8.166	0.200	14.566	–
9	(Turkey) Ahmet Önder	5.900	8.600		14.500	Q
10	(Italy) Nicola Bartolini	5.800	8.666		14.466	R1
11	(Russia) Ivan Stretovich	5.800	8.633		14.433	–
12	(Finland) Emil Soravuo	5.500	8.866		14.366	R2
13	(Spain) Nicolau Mir	6.000	8.333		14.333	R3

==== Pommel horse ====
Rank	Gymnast	D Score	E Score	Pen.	Total	Qual.
1	(United Kingdom) Max Whitlock	6.800	8.233		15.033	Q
2	(Russia) Vladislav Polyashov	6.100	8.466		14.566	Q
3	(United Kingdom) Brinn Bevan	6.100	8.133		14.233	Q
4	(Turkey) Ferhat Arıcan	5.600	8.533		14.133	Q
5	(United Kingdom) James Hall	5.900	8.233		14.133	–
6	(Cyprus) Marios Georgiou	5.800	8.300		14.100	Q
7	(Russia) Nikita Nagornyy	5.900	8.200		14.100	Q
8	(Ukraine) Oleg Verniaiev	6.100	8.000		14.100	Q
9	(Russia) Artur Dalaloyan	5.600	8.466		14.066	–
10	(France) Cyril Tommasone	6.200	7.866		14.066	Q
11	(Belarus) Vasili Mikhalitsyn	6.000	8.033		14.033	R1
12	(Israel) Artem Dolgopyat	5.600	8.400		14.000	R2
13	(Croatia) Robert Seligman	5.900	8.066		13.966	R3

==== Rings ====
Rank	Gymnast	D Score	E Score	Pen.	Total	Qual.
1	(Ukraine) Igor Radivilov	6.000	8.833		14.833	Q
2	(Armenia) Vahagn Davtyan	6.100	8.666		14.766	Q
3	(Italy) Marco Lodadio	6.300	8.433		14.733	Q
4	(Armenia) Artur Tovmasyan	6.100	8.600		14.700	Q
5	(Russia) Denis Ablyazin	6.100	8.533		14.633	Q
6	(Russia) Nikita Nagornyy	6.000	8.600		14.600	Q
6	(France) Samir Aït Saïd	6.000	8.600		14.600	Q
8	(United Kingdom) Courtney Tulloch	6.400	8.200		14.600	Q
9	(Russia) Artur Dalaloyan	5.900	8.666		14.566	–
10	(Turkey) İbrahim Çolak	6.200	8.666	0.300	14.566	R1
11	(Russia) Dmitrii Lankin	6.100	8.433		14.533	–
12	(Austria) Vinzenz Hoeck	6.200	8.200		14.400	R2
13	(Armenia) Artur Avetisyan	5.700	8.566		14.266	–
14	(Turkey) Yunus Gündogdu	6.200	7.933		14.133	R3

==== Vault ====
Rank	Gymnast	D Score	E Score	Pen.	Score 1	D Score	E Score	Pen.	Score 2	Total	Qual.
Rank	Gymnast	Vault 1				Vault 2				Total	Qual.
1	(Russia) Artur Dalaloyan	5.600	9.200		14.800	5.600	9.333		14.933	14.866	Q
2	(Russia) Denis Ablyazin	5.600	9.300		14.900	5.600	9.100		14.700	14.800	Q
3	(Russia) Nikita Nagornyy	5.600	9.233		14.833	5.600	9.166		14.766	14.799	–
4	(Ukraine) Igor Radivilov	5.600	9.233		14.833	5.600	9.000		14.600	14.716	Q
5	(Russia) Dmitrii Lankin	5.600	9.200		14.800	5.200	9.133		14.333	14.566	–
6	(Israel) Andrey Medvedev	5.600	9.033		14.633	5.200	9.233		14.433	14.533	Q
7	(United Kingdom) Courtney Tulloch	5.600	8.866		14.466	5.600	9.000		14.600	14.533	Q
8	(Italy) Nicola Bartolini	5.200	9.233		14.433	4.800	9.500		14.300	14.366	Q
9	(Switzerland) Benjamin Gischard	5.200	9.100		14.300	5.200	9.233		14.433	14.366	Q
10	(Belarus) Yahor Sharamkou	5.200	9.200		14.400	5.600	8.666		14.266	14.333	Q
11	(Armenia) Artur Davtyan	5.600	9.100	0.100	14.600	5.600	8.733	0.300	14.033	14.316	R1
12	(Germany) Nick Klessing	5.600	8.900		14.500	4.800	9.266		14.066	14.283	R2
13	(Germany) Felix Remuta	5.200	9.133		14.333	5.200	9.033		14.233	14.283	R3

==== Parallel bars ====
Rank	Gymnast	D Score	E Score	Pen.	Total	Qual.
1	(Russia) Nikita Nagornyy	6.400	8.733		15.133	Q
2	(Turkey) Ferhat Arıcan	6.300	8.733		15.033	Q
3	(Ukraine) Petro Pakhniuk	6.200	8.800		15.000	Q
4	(Ukraine) Oleg Verniaiev	6.300	8.600		14.900	Q
5	(Turkey) Ahmet Önder	6.200	8.666		14.866	Q
6	(Russia) Artur Dalaloyan	6.500	8.366		14.866	Q
7	(Switzerland) Christian Baumann	6.100	8.566		14.666	Q
8	(Russia) Vladislav Polyashov	6.200	8.366		14.566	–
9	(United Kingdom) Brinn Bevan	5.900	8.633		14.533	Q
10	(Germany) Marcel Nguyen	6.200	8.333		14.533	R1
11	(Germany) Lukas Dauser	6.300	8.233		14.533	R2
12	(Switzerland) Taha Serhani	5.700	8.766		14.466	R3

==== Horizontal bar ====
Rank	Gymnast	D Score	E Score	Pen.	Total	Qual.
1	(Russia) Artur Dalaloyan	5.900	8.766		14.666	Q
2	(Netherlands) Epke Zonderland	6.200	8.333		14.533	Q
3	(Croatia) Tin Srbić	5.900	8.600		14.500	Q
4	(Italy) Carlo Macchini	5.700	8.633		14.333	Q
5	(Russia) Ivan Stretovich	5.900	8.366		14.266	Q
6	(United Kingdom) James Hall	5.800	8.400		14.200	Q
7	(Turkey) Ahmet Önder	5.600	8.566		14.166	Q
7	(Italy) Ludovico Edalli	5.600	8.566		14.166	Q
9	(Italy) Nicolò Mozzato	5.400	8.733		14.133	–
10	(Switzerland) Christian Baumann	5.800	8.333		14.133	R1
11	(Cyprus) Marios Georgiou	5.800	8.266		14.066	R2
12	(Switzerland) Taha Serhani	6.100	7.966		14.066	R3

=== Women's results ===
==== Individual all-around ====
Rank	Gymnast	Vault (gymnastics)	Uneven bars	Balance beam	Floor (gymnastics)	Total	Qual.
1	(Russia) Angelina Melnikova	14.233	14.600	12.800	13.533	55.166	Q
2	(France) Mélanie de Jesus dos Santos	14.433	14.033	13.233	13.333	55.032	Q
3	(United Kingdom) Alice Kinsella	14.000	13.800	13.566	13.066	54.432	Q
4	(United Kingdom) Ellie Downie	14.466	13.833	12.966	12.700	53.965	Q
5	(United Kingdom) Amelie Morgan	14.100	13.900	13.033	12.666	53.699	–
6	(Ukraine) Anastasiia Bachynska	14.000	13.566	13.533	12.400	53.499	Q
7	(Italy) Alice D'Amato	14.366	14.000	12.466	12.533	53.365	Q
8	(Italy) Giorgia Villa	14.233	12.700	13.766	12.666	53.365	Q
9	(Romania) Denisa Golgotă	14.366	12.700	13.200	13.033	53.299	Q
10	(France) Lorette Charpy	13.533	13.933	13.266	12.433	53.165	Q
11	(Italy) Asia D'Amato	14.300	13.866	11.433	12.900	52.499	–
12	(Ukraine) Diana Varinska	13.500	13.733	12.166	12.966	52.365	Q
13	(Netherlands) Eythora Thorsdottir	13.433	13.866	11.633	13.300	52.232	Q
14	(Italy) Elisa Iorio	13.233	13.266	13.000	12.633	52.132	–
15	(Netherlands) Tisha Volleman	13.933	13.000	12.366	12.733	52.032	Q
16	(Russia) Angelina Simakova	13.300	13.666	13.066	11.933	51.965	Q
17	(Hungary) Nóra Fehér	12.966	13.400	12.800	12.466	51.632	Q
18	(Spain) Cintia Rodriguez	13.333	12.333	13.033	12.733	51.432	Q
19	(Czech Republic) Aneta Holasová	13.566	12.566	12.600	12.533	51.265	Q
20	(Germany) Lisa Zimmermann	13.366	12.900	12.433	12.066	50.765	Q
21	(Switzerland) Ilaria Käslin	13.400	11.333	13.266	12.433	50.432	Q
22	(Portugal) Ana Filipa Martins	13.366	13.100	11.500	12.366	50.332	Q
23	(Belgium) Maellyse Brassart	13.400	13.300	11.366	12.233	50.299	Q
24	(Azerbaijan) Marina Nekrasova	13.666	11.900	12.500	12.033	50.099	Q
25	(Spain) Laura Bechdejú	13.400	13.000	11.266	12.366	50.032	Q
26	(Sweden) Jessica Castles	13.100	12.133	11.833	12.833	49.899	Q
27	(Belgium) Jade Vansteenkiste	13.500	12.733	10.366	13.133	49.732	Q
28	(Romania) Nica Ivănuș	13.400	11.333	12.733	12.000	49.466	R1
29	(Netherlands) Sanna Veerman	13.800	14.133	9.666	11.833	49.432	–
30	(Poland) Gabriela Janik	13.566	11.800	12.800	11.133	49.299	R2
31	(Latvia) Elīna Vihrova	13.366	11.933	10.800	12.966	49.065	R3

==== Vault ====
Rank	Gymnast	D Score	E Score	Pen.	Score 1	D Score	E Score	Pen.	Score 2	Total	Qual.
Rank	Gymnast	Vault 1				Vault 2				Total	Qual.
1	(United Kingdom) Ellie Downie	5.400	9.066		14.466	5.200	9.066		14.266	14.366	Q
2	(Slovenia) Teja Belak	5.400	8.966		14.366	5.400	8.866		14.266	14.316	Q
3	(France) Coline Devillard	5.800	9.166		14.966	4.600	8.966	0.100	13.466	14.216	Q
4	(Italy) Asia D'Amato	5.400	8.900		14.300	5.200	8.833		14.033	14.166	Q
5	(Russia) Maria Paseka	6.000	7.500		13.500	5.800	8.966		14.766	14.133	Q
6	(Russia) Angelina Melnikova	5.400	8.833		14.233	5.200	8.766		13.966	14.099	Q
7	(Hungary) Sára Péter	5.400	8.933		14.333	4.600	9.033		13.633	13.983	Q
8	(Romania) Denisa Golgotă	5.400	8.966		14.366	4.800	8.700		13.500	13.933	Q
9	(Azerbaijan) Marina Nekrasova	5.000	8.666		13.666	5.200	8.800		14.000	13.833	R1
10	(Hungary) Csenge Bácskay	5.400	8.800	0.100	14.100	4.800	8.733		13.533	13.816	R2
11	(Slovenia) Tjaša Kysselef	4.800	8.866		13.666	5.000	8.766		13.766	13.716	R3

==== Uneven bars ====
Rank	Gymnast	D Score	E Score	Pen.	Total	Qual.
1	(Sweden) Jonna Adlerteg	6.200	8.466		14.666	Q
2	(Russia) Angelina Melnikova	6.100	8.500		14.600	Q
3	(Belarus) Anastasiya Alistratava	5.800	8.366		14.166	Q
4	(Russia) Anastasia Ilyankova	6.100	8.033		14.133	Q
4	(Netherlands) Sanna Veerman	6.100	8.033		14.133	Q
6	(France) Mélanie de Jesus dos Santos	5.700	8.333		14.033	Q
7	(Italy) Alice D'Amato	5.800	8.200		14.000	Q
8	(France) Lorette Charpy	5.700	8.233		13.933	Q
9	(Belgium) Fien Enghels	5.800	8.133		13.933	R1
10	(United Kingdom) Amelie Morgan	5.700	8.200		13.900	R2
11	(Netherlands) Eythora Thorsdottir	5.500	8.366		13.866	R3

==== Balance beam ====
Rank	Gymnast	D Score	E Score	Pen.	Total	Qual.
1	(Italy) Giorgia Villa	5.700	8.066		13.766	Q
2	(Germany) Pauline Schäfer	5.300	8.366		13.666	Q
3	(United Kingdom) Alice Kinsella	5.500	8.066		13.566	Q
4	(Ukraine) Anastasiia Bachynska	5.600	7.933		13.533	Q
5	(Switzerland) Ilaria Käslin	5.300	7.966		13.266	Q
6	(France) Lorette Charpy	5.700	7.566		13.266	Q
7	(France) Mélanie de Jesus dos Santos	5.700	7.533		13.233	Q
8	(Romania) Denisa Golgotă	5.100	8.100		13.200	Q
9	(Russia) Angelina Simakova	5.400	7.666		13.066	R1
10	(Spain) Cintia Rodriguez	4.900	8.133		13.033	R2
11	(United Kingdom) Amelie Morgan	5.300	7.733		13.033	R3

==== Floor ====
Rank	Gymnast	D Score	E Score	Pen.	Total	Qual.
1	(United Kingdom) Claudia Fragapane	5.600	8.000		13.600	Q
2	(Russia) Angelina Melnikova	5.900	7.733	0.100	13.533	Q
3	(France) Mélanie de Jesus dos Santos	5.600	7.833	0.100	13.333	Q
4	(Netherlands) Eythora Thorsdottir	5.300	8.000		13.300	Q
5	(Belgium) Jade Vansteenkiste	5.100	8.033		13.133	Q
5	(France) Marine Boyer	5.100	8.033		13.133	Q
7	(United Kingdom) Alice Kinsella	5.400	7.666		13.066	Q
8	(Romania) Denisa Golgotă	5.500	7.533		13.033	Q
9	(Ukraine) Diana Varinska	4.900	8.066		12.966	R1
10	(Latvia) Elīna Vihrova	5.100	7.866		12.966	R2
11	(Ukraine) Angelina Radivilova	5.200	7.766		12.966	R3
