= Gymnastics at the 2020 Summer Olympics – Women's artistic team all-around =

Women's artistic team all-around at the Games of the XXXII Olympiad
- Venue: Ariake Gymnastics Centre
- Date: 25 July (qualification); 27 July (final)
- Competitors: 48 from 12 nations
- Winning total: 169.528 points

Medalists
1st place, gold medalist(s)		Lilia Akhaimova; Viktoria Listunova; Angelina Melnikova; Vladislava Urazova	ROC
2nd place, silver medalist(s)		Simone Biles; Jordan Chiles; Sunisa Lee; Grace McCallum	United States
3rd place, bronze medalist(s)		Jennifer Gadirova; Jessica Gadirova; Alice Kinsella; Amelie Morgan	Great Britain

The women's artistic team all-around event at the 2020 Summer Olympics was held on 25 and 27 July 2021 at the Ariake Gymnastics Centre. There were 12 teams of 4 gymnasts each.

The competition was won by the Russian athletes competing as the Russian Olympic Committee (ROC), the 2016 silver medalists, when they competed as Russia. It was the first women's team all-around title for the Russian team since 1992, when it competed as the Unified Team. They led throughout the competition despite two falls on balance beam in the third rotation. The United States, the two-time defending champions and 2019 world champions, were second. Notably, top American gymnast Simone Biles withdrew from competing following the first rotation due to health concerns, and the three remaining American athletes had to alter their planned lineups and routines. The bronze was won by Great Britain, which displaced Italy from the bronze medal position in the last rotation. Great Britain have not medaled in the women's team all-around since 1928, when they won bronze.

ROC is the first nation to win both the men's and women's team all-around titles at the same Olympics since China did so at the 2008 Summer Olympics.

The medals for the competition were presented by Andrew Parsons, Brazil; IOC Executive Board Member, and the medalists' bouquets were presented by Vasily Titov, Russia; FIG Vice-President.

== Background ==
This was the 21st appearance of the women's artistic team all-around event. It was first introduced in 1928 and has featured at every Summer Olympics since 1936.

== Qualified teams ==
To reach the Olympics, a National Olympic Committee had to earn one of 12 team quota places. These were allocated through the 2018 World Artistic Gymnastics Championships (top three teams) and the 2019 World Artistic Gymnastics Championships (top nine teams, excluding those qualified in 2018). Those 12 teams competed in the qualification round in Tokyo on 25 July, with the top eight advancing to the final.

The following teams qualified for the Olympics by achieving a top three placement at the 2018 World Artistic Gymnastics Championships:

- United States
- ROC
- China

The following teams qualified for the event by achieving a top nine placement among non-qualified teams at the 2019 World Artistic Gymnastics Championships:

- France
- Canada
- Netherlands
- Great Britain
- Italy
- Germany
- Belgium
- Japan
- Spain

== Schedule ==
Date	Time	Round	Subdivision
25 July	10:00	Qualification	Subdivision 1
25 July	11:50	Qualification	Subdivision 2
25 July	15:10	Qualification	Subdivision 3
25 July	17:05	Qualification	Subdivision 4
25 July	20:20	Qualification	Subdivision 5
27 July	19:45	Final	–
All times are local time (UTC+09:00).

== Qualifications ==
The top eight teams in qualifications, based on combined scores of each apparatus, advanced to the final. In the final, each team selected three gymnasts to compete on each apparatus. All scores on each apparatus were summed to give a final team score. The scores in qualification did not carry over to the final.

Rank	Team	Vault (gymnastics)	Uneven bars	Balance beam	Floor (gymnastics)	Total
1	ROC	43.832	44.565	41.599	41.633	171.629
2	United States	44.199	43.866	41.332	41.165	170.562
3	China	42.366	42.633	42.399	39.465	166.863
4	France	43.665	42.198	39.899	38.799	164.561
5	Belgium	41.066	43.099	40.465	39.265	163.895
6	Great Britain	43.199	40.699	39.199	40.599	163.396 (Note: Great Britain incurred a neutral deduction of 0.300 points for Jennifer Gadirova exceeding the touch warm-up time on vault.)
7	Italy	42.766	41.866	38.799	39.899	163.330
8	Japan	42.432	39.632	39.999	40.599	162.662

== Final ==
Rank	Team	Vault (gymnastics)	Uneven bars	Balance beam	Floor (gymnastics)	Total
1st place, gold medalist(s)	ROC	43.799 (1)	44.699 (1)	39.532 (4)	41.498 (1)	169.528
1st place, gold medalist(s)	Lilia Akhaimova (ROC)	14.733				169.528
1st place, gold medalist(s)	Viktoria Listunova (ROC)		14.900	14.333	14.166	169.528
1st place, gold medalist(s)	Angelina Melnikova (ROC)	14.600	14.933	12.566	13.966	169.528
1st place, gold medalist(s)	Vladislava Urazova (ROC)	14.466	14.866	12.633	13.366	169.528
2nd place, silver medalist(s)	United States	42.732 (4)	43.266 (2)	41.232 (2)	38.866 (8)	166.096
2nd place, silver medalist(s)	Simone Biles (USA)	13.766				166.096
2nd place, silver medalist(s)	Jordan Chiles (USA)	14.666	14.166	13.433	11.700	166.096
2nd place, silver medalist(s)	Sunisa Lee (USA)		15.400	14.133	13.666	166.096
2nd place, silver medalist(s)	Grace McCallum (USA)	14.300	13.700	13.666	13.500	166.096
3rd place, bronze medalist(s)	Great Britain	43.132 (3)	41.765 (3)	38.866 (6)	40.333 (3)	164.096
3rd place, bronze medalist(s)	Jennifer Gadirova (GBR)	14.433		13.300	13.700	164.096
3rd place, bronze medalist(s)	Jessica Gadirova (GBR)	14.433	13.566		13.833	164.096
3rd place, bronze medalist(s)	Alice Kinsella (GBR)	14.266	14.166	13.333	12.800	164.096
3rd place, bronze medalist(s)	Amelie Morgan (GBR)		14.033	12.233		164.096
4	Italy	42.665 (5)	41.499 (5)	39.108 (5)	40.366 (2)	163.638
4	Alice D'Amato (ITA)	14.166	14.166	13.133	13.100	163.638
4	Asia D'Amato (ITA)	14.266	13.900	12.900	13.166	163.638
4	Vanessa Ferrari (ITA)	14.233			14.100	163.638
4	Martina Maggio (ITA)		13.433	13.075		163.638
5	Japan	42.349 (6)	40.133 (8)	40.732 (3)	40.066 (4)	163.280
5	Hitomi Hatakeda (JPN)		14.100	13.333	12.800	163.280
5	Yuna Hiraiwa (JPN)	13.900		13.566		163.280
5	Mai Murakami (JPN)	14.266	12.700	13.833	14.066	163.280
5	Aiko Sugihara (JPN)	14.183	13.333		13.200	163.280
6	France	43.600 (2)	41.399 (6)	38.465 (7)	39.800 (5)	163.264
6	Marine Boyer (FRA)			12.066	13.000	163.264
6	Mélanie de Jesus dos Santos (FRA)	14.500	14.200	13.566	13.700	163.264
6	Aline Friess (FRA)	14.900	13.733			163.264
6	Carolann Héduit (FRA)	14.200	13.466	12.833	13.100	163.264
7	China	39.366 (8)	41.066 (7)	41.599 (1)	39.165 (7)	161.196
7	Lu Yufei (CHN)		13.333	13.966	13.166	161.196
7	Ou Yushan (CHN)	12.700	13.233			161.196
7	Tang Xijing (CHN)	12.600	14.500	13.733	12.866	161.196
7	Zhang Jin (CHN)	14.066		13.900	13.133	161.196
8	Belgium	41.732 (7)	41.632 (4)	36.999 (8)	39.332 (6)	159.695
8	Maellyse Brassart (BEL)	14.033		10.933		159.695
8	Nina Derwael (BEL)		15.400	13.866	13.366	159.695
8	Lisa Vaelen (BEL)	14.233	13.766		12.900	159.695
8	Jutta Verkest (BEL)	13.466	12.466	12.200	13.066	159.695
