= Jutta Verkest =

Belgian artistic gymnast

- Born: 11 October 2005 (age 20) Mechelen, Belgium

Gymnastics career
- Discipline: Women's artistic gymnastics
- Country represented: Belgium (2017–2024)
- Club: GymFlex
- Gym: Topsportschool Gent
- Head coach: Ulla Koch
- Former coaches: Marjorie Heuls, Yves Kieffer
- Retired: 2024

Jutta Verkest (born 11 October 2005) is a Belgian retired artistic gymnast. She represented Belgium at the 2020 Summer Olympics and was the youngest gymnast at the 2020 Olympic Games.

== Personal life ==
Jutta Verkest was born on 11 October 2005, in Mechelen, and she began gymnastics in 2010. Her mother, Mireille, is from the Democratic Republic of the Congo. Her idol is Gabby Douglas. She moved to Ghent to train with the Belgian national team.

== Junior career ==
At the 2016 Belgian Championships, Verkest finished seventh in the all-around and won the bronze medal on the floor exercise. She then made her international debut at the 2017 FIT Challenge and finished eleventh in the all-around in the Espoir division. She then competed at the 2017 Swiss Cup and helped the Belgian team win the silver medal behind Germany. At the 2018 Tournoi International, she finished fourth in the all-around with a total score of 50.267. She also won the silver medal in the uneven bars event final behind Swiss gymnast Lena Bickel. Then at the 2018 Top Gym Tournament, she won the gold medal on the uneven bars and placed eighth in the all-around.

Verkest competed at the 2019 City of Jesolo Trophy, and the Belgian junior team won the bronze medal behind Russia and the United States. Individually, she finished twenty-sixth in the all-around. She then competed at the L'International Gymnix where the Belgian team won the silver medal behind the United States. At the 2019 European Youth Summer Olympic Festival, Verkest competed with Charlotte Beydts and Margaux Dandois, and they finished sixth. Individually, Verkest finished fourteenth in the all-around final and sixth in the uneven bars final. At the 2020 L'International Gymnix, Verkest won a bronze medal on the uneven bars behind Konnor McClain and Skye Blakely.

== Senior career ==
Verkest made her senior international debut at the 2021 Heerenveen Friendly, and she finished seventh in the all-around. She was initially Belgium's reserve athlete for the 2021 European Championships, but when Nina Derwael withdrew due to a minor foot injury, Verkest was sent. After the qualification round, she was the third reserve for the all-around final, but she was added to the competition after Giulia Steingruber withdrew. Verkest was only notified one hour before the all-around final started. She ultimately finished tenth with a total score of 52.132. She then competed at the FIT Challenge and helped the Belgian team win the silver medal behind France. Individually, she placed sixth in the all-around and fourth on the uneven bars, and she won the bronze medal on the floor exercise behind Roxana Popa and Maria Ceplinschi.

Verkest was selected to represent Belgium at the 2020 Summer Olympics alongside Maellyse Brassart, Nina Derwael, and Lisa Vaelen. Had the 2020 Olympic Games not been postponed, she would have not been age-eligible for the competition due to her 2005 birth date. Before the Olympics, she stated, "The postponement of the Games was positive for me. I have come to gain experience with an eye to Paris in 2024." She competed on all four events in the team final where the team finished eighth. Individually, she qualified for the all-around final where she finished twenty-third with a total score of 51.232.

Verkest competed at the 2022 European Championships in Munich, where she contributed to Belgium's fifth-place finish in the team final.

Verkest announced her retirement from the sport on 15 April 2024.

== Competitive history ==
Competitive history of Jutta Verkest at the junior level
| Year | Event | Team | AA | VT | UB | BB | FX |
|---|---|---|---|---|---|---|---|
| 2016 | Belgian Championships | | 7 | | | | 3rd place, bronze medalist(s) |
| 2017 | FIT Challenge | 4 | 11 | | | | |
| 2017 | Swiss Cup | 2nd place, silver medalist(s) | 18 | | | | |
| 2018 | Tournoi International | | 4 | | 2nd place, silver medalist(s) | 8 | |
| 2018 | Top Gym | | 8 | | 1st place, gold medalist(s) | | 7 |
| 2019 | City of Jesolo Trophy | 3rd place, bronze medalist(s) | 26 | | | | |
| 2019 | International Gymnix | 2nd place, silver medalist(s) | 8 | | | | 4 |
| 2019 | Belgian Championships | | 4 | 4 | 3rd place, bronze medalist(s) | 2nd place, silver medalist(s) | 4 |
| 2019 | FIT Challenge | 3rd place, bronze medalist(s) | 21 | | | | |
| 2019 | European Youth Olympic Festival | 6 | 14 | | 6 | | |
| 2019 | Elite Gym Massilia | | 43 | | | | |
| 2019 | Top Gym | 3rd place, bronze medalist(s) | 6 | | 2nd place, silver medalist(s) | 4 | |
| 2020 | International Gymnix | 2nd place, silver medalist(s) | 6 | | 3rd place, bronze medalist(s) | 4 | |

Competitive history of Jutta Verkest at the senior level
| Year | Event | Team | AA | VT | UB | BB | FX |
|---|---|---|---|---|---|---|---|
| 2021 | Belgian Test Meet | | 6 | | | | |
| 2021 | Heerenveen Friendly | | 7 | | | | |
| 2021 | European Championships | | 10 | | | | |
| 2021 | FIT Challenge | 2nd place, silver medalist(s) | 6 | | 4 | | 3rd place, bronze medalist(s) |
| 2021 | Olympic Games | 8 | 23 | | | | |
| 2022 | Belgian Championships | | 3rd place, bronze medalist(s) | 3rd place, bronze medalist(s) | 2nd place, silver medalist(s) | | 3rd place, bronze medalist(s) |
| 2022 | Ghent Friendly | | 4 | 3rd place, bronze medalist(s) | | | |
| 2022 | European Championships | 5 | | | | | |
| 2022 | World Championships | R3 | | | | | |
| 2023 | DTB Pokal Team Challenge | 2nd place, silver medalist(s) | 7 | | | | 6 |
| 2023 | European Championships | 7 | | | | | |
| 2023 | Belgian Championships | | | | 1st place, gold medalist(s) | 2nd place, silver medalist(s) | |
| 2023 | World Championships | 17 | | | | | |
