= Margaux Daveloose =

Belgian artistic gymnast

- Born: 29 September 2003 (age 22) Bruges, Belgium
- Height: 162 cm (5 ft 4 in)

Gymnastics career
- Discipline: Women's artistic gymnastics
- Country represented: Belgium
- Club: Turnclub Varsenare
- Head coaches: Marjorie Heuls, Yves Kieffer

Margaux Daveloose (born 29 September 2003) is a Belgian former artistic gymnast. She competed at the 2019 World Championships.

== Personal life ==
Margaux Daveloose was born on 29 September 2003, in Bruges. She was named the 2018 Sportswoman of the Year by the Association of Sports Journalists in Bruges, and she received the 2019 Female Youth Trophy from the Bruges Sports Council. She speaks Dutch and English. She looks up to fellow Belgian national team member Nina Derwael.

== Gymnastics career ==
Daveloose competed at the 2017 European Youth Summer Olympic Festival where she finished 12th in the all-around final with a score of 50.000. At the 2018 European Junior Championships, the Belgian team finished 6th, and Daveloose finished 10th in the all-around with a score of 51.000.

She competed at the 2019 World Championships along with Maellyse Brassart, Senna Deriks, Nina Derwael, and Jade Vansteenkiste. The team finished in 10th place and qualified for a team spot to the 2020 Olympic Games.

Daveloose was selected for Belgium's Olympic pre-selection team of thirteen gymnasts, six of whom were chosen for the 2020 Olympic team. At the 2021 Belgian Test Meet, she placed third in the all-around behind Noémie Louon and Nina Derwael. She was then selected for the team for the 2021 European Championships along with Derwael, Fien Enghels, and Lisa Vaelen.
