= Emily Lee =

American artistic gymnast

- Nickname: Em
- Born: October 4, 2002 (age 23) San Jose, California, U.S.

Gymnastics career
- Discipline: Women's artistic gymnastics
- Country represented: United States (2020–2021)
- College team: UCLA Bruins (2022–2025)
- Club: West Valley Gymnastics School
- Head coaches: Paul Duron and Judy Sun
Medal record
Representing the UCLA Bruins
NCAA Championships
Silver medal – second place	2025 Fort Worth	Team

Emily Lee (born October 4, 2002) is an American former artistic gymnast. She is a former member of the United States national team. She is the 2021 Winter Cup all-around bronze medalist and the 2020 L'International Gymnix all-around champion. She competed in collegiate gymnastics with the UCLA Bruins.

== Personal life ==
Emily Lee was born on October 4, 2002, in San Jose, California to Tina and Calvin Lee. She is the middle of five children; her younger sister Taylor died of Leukemia in 2015. She began gymnastics when she was eight years old. She signed her National Letter of Intent for the UCLA Bruins gymnastics team, and she will join in the 2022 season. Lee worked for Instacart and gave private gymnastics lessons in order to fund her gymnastics training expenses.

== Gymnastics career ==
=== 2016–17 ===
Lee competed at the 2016 U.S. Classic where she finished twenty-second in the all-around with a total score of 53.200, and she placed ninth on the balance beam. She qualified for the 2016 U.S. Championships where she finished twentieth in the all-around. Lee missed the 2017 season due to an injury.

=== 2018–19 ===
At the 2018 Desert Lights National Qualifier, she won the all-around, balance beam, and floor exercise and re-qualified for elite level gymnastics. She competed at the 2018 American Classic, but she suffered an injury during her uneven bars routine and withdrew from the rest of the meet.

At the 2019 Gliders National Qualifier, Lee once again qualified for senior elite gymnastics and for the U.S. Classic. She then competed at the American Classic where she won the silver medal in the all-around behind Faith Torrez and the gold medal on the floor exercise. At the 2019 U.S. Classic, she placed twelfth in the all-around. She qualified for the 2019 U.S. Championships where she placed eleventh in the all-around. She was selected to compete at the U.S. Worlds Trials where she placed tenth in the all-around, but she was not selected for the World Championships team.

=== 2020–21 ===
On March 3, 2020, Lee was added to the U.S. National Team when she was selected for her first international assignment- the L'International Gymnix in Montreal. The American team of Lee, Lilly Lippeatt, MyKayla Skinner, and Faith Torrez won the gold medal. Individually, Lee won the gold medal in the all-around and the silver medal on the floor exercise behind Skinner.

At the 2021 Winter Cup, Lee won the bronze medal in the all-around behind Jordan Chiles and Shilese Jones with a total score of 53.400. Then at the national team camp in March, she had the highest score on the balance beam with a 15.100. At the National Championships Lee competed the all-around both days and finished in 13th place. As a result she was added to the national team and qualified to compete at the Olympic Trials. At the Olympic Trials Lee suffered an Achilles tendon rupture while competing on floor exercise.

== Competitive history ==
Competitive history of Emily Lee at the junior elite level
Year	Event	Team	AA	VT	UB	BB	FX
2016	J.O. National Championships		10	8		6	1st place, gold medalist(s)
2016	U.S. Classic		22	19	34	9	18
2016	U.S. Championships		20	18	20	7	24

Competitive history of Emily Lee at the senior elite level
Year	Event	Team	AA	VT	UB	BB	FX
2018	American Classic			5	14		
2019	American Classic		2nd place, silver medalist(s)	3rd place, bronze medalist(s)	3rd place, bronze medalist(s)	6	1st place, gold medalist(s)
2019	U.S. Classic		12		15	13	9
2019	U.S. Championships		11		15	6	8
2019	Worlds Team Selection Camp		10	7	10	5	11
2020	International Gymnix	1st place, gold medalist(s)	1st place, gold medalist(s)				2nd place, silver medalist(s)
2021	Winter Cup		3rd place, bronze medalist(s)	5	18	7	2nd place, silver medalist(s)
2021	U.S. Classic		8		26	6	4
2021	U.S. Championships		13		22	7	9
2021	U.S. Olympic Trials		15		17	8	15
