= List of Olympic male artistic gymnasts for Turkey =

Aleko Mulos was the first ever Turkish man to compete at the Olympic Games, doing so in 1908. Turkey fielded its first Olympic team at the 2024 Olympic Games in Paris. Previously Turkey only had individual athletes compete at the 2016 and 2020 Olympic Games. At the 2020 Olympic Games Ferhat Arıcan became the first Turkish male gymnast to win an Olympic medal, earning bronze on the parallel bars.

== Gymnasts ==
=== Summer Olympics ===
Gymnast	Years
Ferhat Arıcan	2016, 2020, 2024
Adem Asil	2020, 2024
İbrahim Çolak	2020, 2024
Emre Dodanlı	2024
Aleko Mulos	1908
Ahmet Önder	2020, 2024

=== Youth Olympics ===
Gymnast	Years
Ferhat Arıcan	2010
Bora Tarhan	2018

== Medalists ==
Medal	Name	Year	Event
Bronze	Ferhat Arıcan	(Japan) 2020 Tokyo	Men's parallel bars

== See also ==
- Turkey men's national artistic gymnastics team
