= 2018 FIG Artistic Gymnastics World Cup series =

International gymnastics competition series

FIG Artistic Gymnastics World Cup series
- Location: various — see locations
- Date: February 22 – November 25, 2018 see schedule

The 2018 FIG World Cup circuit in Artistic Gymnastics was a series of competitions officially organized and promoted by the International Gymnastics Federation (FIG) in 2018.

== Schedule ==
=== World Cup series ===
Date	Location	Event	Type
February 22–25	(Australia) Melbourne	FIG World Cup 2018	C III – Apparatus
March 3	(United States) Hoffman Estates	American Cup FIG Individual All-Around World Cup 2018	C II – All-Around
March 15–18	(Azerbaijan) Baku	FIG World Cup 2018	C III – Apparatus
March 17–18	(Germany) Stuttgart	EnBW -DTB-Pokal FIG Individual All-Around World Cup 2018	C II – All-Around
March 21–22	(United Kingdom) Birmingham	FIG Individual All-Around World Cup 2018	C II – All-Around
March 21–24	(Qatar) Doha	FIG World Cup 2018	C III – Apparatus
April 14	(Japan) Tokyo	FIG Individual All-Around World Cup 2018	C II – All-Around
November 22–25	(Germany) Cottbus	43rd Turnier der Meister FIG Individual Apparatus World Cup 2018	C III – Apparatus

=== World Challenge Cup series ===
Date	Location	Event	Type
May 24–27	(Croatia) Osijek	FIG World Challenge Cup	C III – Apparatus
May 31–June 3	(Slovenia) Koper	FIG World Challenge Cup	C III – Apparatus
June 14–17	(Portugal) Guimarães	FIG World Challenge Cup	C III – Apparatus
July 6–8	(Turkey) Mersin	FIG World Challenge Cup	C III – Apparatus
September 21–23	(Hungary) Szombathely	FIG World Challenge Cup	C III – Apparatus
September 29–30	(France) Paris	FIG World Challenge Cup	C III – Apparatus

== Medalists ==
=== Men ===
==== World Cup series ====
Competition	Event	Gold	Silver	Bronze
Melbourne	Floor Exercise	(Japan) Kazuyuki Takeda	(China) Ge Shihao	(Lithuania) Robert Tvorogal
Melbourne	Pommel Horse	(Kazakhstan) Nariman Kurbanov	(Chinese Taipei) Lee Chih-kai	(Australia) Christopher Remkes
Melbourne	Rings	(China) Ma Yue	(China) Wu Guanhua	(Japan) Kazuyuki Takeda
Melbourne	Vault	(Australia) Christopher Remkes	(Chinese Taipei) Lee Chih-kai	(Philippines) Carlos Edriel Yulo
Melbourne	Parallel Bars	(China) Wu Xiaoming	(China) Tan Di	(Australia) Michael Mercieca
Melbourne	Horizontal Bar	(Japan) Hidetaka Miyachi	(Australia) Mitchell Morgans	(Australia) Michael Mercieca
Hoffman Estates	All-Around	(United States) Yul Moldauer	(United Kingdom) James Hall	(Ukraine) Petro Pakhnyuk
Baku	Floor Exercise	(Japan) Kazuma Kaya	(Ukraine) Volodymyr Hrybuk	(Slovenia) Rok Klavora
Baku	Pommel Horse	(China) Weng Hao	(Chinese Taipei) Lee Chih-kai	(Japan) Takaaki Sugino
Baku	Rings	(Greece) Eleftherios Petrounias	(Turkey) İbrahim Çolak	(China) Lan Xingyu
Baku	Vault	(Belarus) Pavel Bulauski	(Philippines) Carlos Edriel Yulo	(Georgia (country)) Konstantin Kuzovkov
Baku	Parallel Bars	(Japan) Kenta Chiba	(Belarus) Andrey Likhovtskiy	(Turkey) Ferhat Arıcan
Baku	Horizontal Bar	(Netherlands) Bart Deurloo	(Belarus) Andrey Likhovtskiy	(Croatia) Anton Kovačević
Stuttgart	All-Around	(Russia) David Belyavskiy	(United States) Akash Modi	(Japan) Yusuke Tanaka
Birmingham	All-Around	(Japan) Shogo Nonomura	(Russia) Nikita Nagornyy	(United Kingdom) James Hall
Doha	Floor Exercise	(Russia) Dmitrii Lankin	(Philippines) Carlos Edriel Yulo	(Japan) Ryohei Kato
Doha	Pommel Horse	(China) Zou Jingyuan	(Chinese Taipei) Lee Chih-kai	(United States) Alec Yoder
Doha	Rings	(Ukraine) Igor Radivilov	(Turkey) İbrahim Çolak	(China) Zou Jingyuan
Doha	Vault	(Ukraine) Igor Radivilov	(China) Qu Ruiyang	(Turkey) Ferhat Arıcan
Doha	Parallel Bars	(China) Zou Jingyuan	(China) Xiao Ruoteng	(Turkey) Ferhat Arıcan
Doha	Horizontal Bar	(Croatia) Tin Srbić	(United States) Marvin Kimble	(China) Deng Shudi
Tokyo	All-Around	(Japan) Kenzō Shirai	(Japan) Wataru Tanigawa	(United States) Sam Mikulak
Cottbus	Floor Exercise	(Israel) Artem Dolgopyat	(Netherlands) Casimir Schmidt	(Philippines) Carlos Yulo
Cottbus	Pommel Horse	(Chinese Taipei) Lee Chih-kai	(China) Weng Hao	(Iran) Saeid Reza Keikha
Cottbus	Rings	(China) Liu Yang	(France) Samir Aït Saïd	(China) You Hao
Cottbus	Vault	(Ukraine) Igor Radivilov	(China) Huang Mingqi	(France) Loris Frasca
Cottbus	Parallel Bars	(Ukraine) Oleg Verniaiev	(Russia) Dmitrii Lankin	(Turkey) Ferhat Arican
Cottbus	Horizontal Bar	(Netherlands) Epke Zonderland	(Croatia) Tin Srbić	(Japan) Hidetaka Miyachi

==== World Challenge Cup series ====
Competition	Event	Gold	Silver	Bronze
Osijek	Floor Exercise	(United Kingdom) Dominick Cunningham	(Israel) Artem Dolgopyat	(Italy) Nicola Bartolini
Osijek	Pommel Horse	(Chinese Taipei) Lee Chih-kai	(Kazakhstan) Akim Mussayev	(Belarus) Vasili Mikhalitsyn
Osijek	Rings	(Russia) Denis Ablyazin	(Turkey) İbrahim Çolak	(Egypt) Ali Zahran
Osijek	Vault	(Israel) Andrey Medvedev	(United Kingdom) Dominick Cunningham	(Italy) Nicola Bartolini
Osijek	Parallel Bars	(Cyprus) Marios Georgiou	(Turkey) Sercan Demir	(Dominican Republic) Audrys Nin Reyes
Osijek	Horizontal Bar	(Croatia) Tin Srbić	(Lithuania) Robert Tvorogal	(Switzerland) Taha Serhani
Koper	Floor Exercise	(Japan) Takumi Sato	(Israel) Artem Dolgopyat	(Switzerland) Benjamin Gischard
Koper	Pommel Horse	(Japan) Kōhei Kameyama	(Kazakhstan) Nariman Kurbanov	(Slovenia) Sašo Bertoncelj
Koper	Rings	(Japan) Kazuyuki Takeda	(Turkey) İbrahim Çolak	(Italy) Marco Lodadio
Koper	Vault	(Vietnam) Thanh Tùng Lê	(Japan) Takumi Sato	(Switzerland) Benjamin Gischard
Koper	Parallel Bars	(Vietnam) Đinh Phương Thành	(Romania) Andrei Muntean	(Italy) Matteo Levantesi
Koper	Horizontal Bar	(Japan) Takaaki Sugino	(Dominican Republic) Audrys Nin Reyes	(Brazil) Gustavo Polato
Guimarães	Floor Exercise	(Guatemala) Jorge Vega	(Japan) Takumi Sato	(Spain) Rayderley Zapata
Guimarães	Pommel Horse	(Canada) Thierry Pellerin	(Hungary) Zoltán Kállai	(Japan) Koki Maeda
Guimarães	Rings	(Cuba) Manrique Larduet	(Romania) Andrei Muntean	(Japan) Kentaro Yunoki
Guimarães	Vault	(Cuba) Manrique Larduet	(Guatemala) Jorge Vega	(Japan) Takumi Sato
Guimarães	Parallel Bars	(Cuba) Manrique Larduet	(Romania) Andrei Muntean	(Switzerland) Henji Mboyo
Guimarães	Horizontal Bar	(Hungary) Dávid Vecsernyés	(Cuba) Randy Leru	(Mexico) Kevin Cerda
Mersin	Floor Exercise	(Turkey) Ahmet Önder	(United Kingdom) Frank Baines	(Turkey) Ferhat Arıcan
Mersin	Pommel Horse	(Republic of Ireland) Rhys McClenaghan	(United Kingdom) Frank Baines	(Canada) Justin Karstadt
Mersin	Rings	(Turkey) İbrahim Çolak	(Romania) Andrei Muntean	(Netherlands) Yuri van Gelder
Mersin	Vault	(Canada) René Cournoyer	(Bulgaria) Dimitar Dimitrov	(Romania) Robert Ghiuzan
Mersin	Parallel Bars	(Romania) Andrei Muntean	(Turkey) Ahmet Önder	(Turkey) Ferhat Arıcan
Mersin	Horizontal Bar	(Turkey) Ümit Şamiloğlu	(Canada) Samuel Zakutney	(United Kingdom) Frank Baines
Szombathely	Floor Exercise	(Israel) Artem Dolgopyat	(Ukraine) Oleg Verniaiev	(Spain) Joel Plata
Szombathely	Pommel Horse	(Ukraine) Oleg Verniaiev	(Slovenia) Sašo Bertoncelj	(Japan) Shogo Nonomura
Szombathely	Rings	(Japan) Shogo Nonomura	(Egypt) Ali Zahran	(Japan) Kenta Chiba
Szombathely	Vault	(Japan) Keisuke Asato	(Vietnam) Lê Thanh Tùng	(Ukraine) Oleg Verniaiev
Szombathely	Parallel Bars	(Ukraine) Petro Pakhnyuk	(Japan) Kenta Chiba	(Ukraine) Oleg Verniaiev
Szombathely	Horizontal Bar	(Japan) Kenta Chiba	(Hungary) Dávid Vecsernyés	(Cyprus) Marios Georgiou
Paris	Floor Exercise	(Israel) Artem Dolgopyat	(Guatemala) Jorge Vega	(Spain) Rayderley Zapata
Paris	Pommel Horse	(France) Cyril Tommasone	(Canada) Thierry Pellerin	(Slovenia) Sašo Bertoncelj
Paris	Rings	(France) Samir Aït Saïd	(Ukraine) Igor Radivilov	(Russia) Denis Ablyazin
Paris	Vault	(France) Loris Frasca	(Israel) Andrey Medvedev	(Morocco) Hamza Hossaini
Paris	Parallel Bars	(Japan) Seiya Taura	(France) Julien Gobaux	(Turkey) Ahmet Önder
Paris	Horizontal Bar	(Japan) Seiya Taura	(Hungary) Dávid Vecsernyés	(Spain) Néstor Abad

===== World Challenge Cup series winners =====
Apparatus	Winner
Floor Exercise	(Israel) Artem Dolgopyat
Pommel Horse	(Slovenia) Sašo Bertoncelj
Rings	(Turkey) İbrahim Çolak
Vault	(Israel) Andrey Medvedev
Parallel Bars	(Romania) Andrei Muntean
Horizontal Bar	(Hungary) Dávid Vecsernyés

=== Women ===
==== World Cup series ====
Competition	Event	Gold	Silver	Bronze
Melbourne	Vault	(Slovenia) Tjaša Kysselef	(Australia) Emily Whitehead	(India) Aruna Budda Reddy
Melbourne	Uneven Bars	(China) Du Siyu	(China) Chen Yile	(Australia) Georgia-Rose Brown
Melbourne	Balance Beam	(China) Chen Yile	(Brazil) Isabel Barbosa	(China) Du Siyu
Melbourne	Floor Exercise	(Australia) Alexandra Eade	(Brazil) Isabel Barbosa	(Slovenia) Tjaša Kysselef
Hoffman Estates	All-Around	(United States) Morgan Hurd	(Japan) Mai Murakami	(United States) Maile O'Keefe
Baku	Vault	(Uzbekistan) Oksana Chusovitina	(Azerbaijan) Marina Nekrasova	(Slovenia) Tjaša Kysselef
Baku	Uneven Bars	(China) Lyu Jiaqi	(China) Luo Huan	(Ukraine) Yana Fedorova
Baku	Balance Beam	(China) Luo Huan	(China) Lyu Jiaqi	(Uzbekistan) Oksana Chusovitina
Baku	Floor Exercise	(Croatia) Ana Đerek	(Greece) Ioanna Xoulogi	(Turkey) Demet Mutlu
Stuttgart	All-Around	(China) Zhang Jin	(Germany) Elisabeth Seitz	(United States) Jordan Chiles
Birmingham	All-Around	(Russia) Angelina Melnikova	(United States) Margzetta Frazier	(United Kingdom) Alice Kinsella
Doha	Vault	(Uzbekistan) Oksana Chusovitina	(North Korea) Pyon Rye-yong	(France) Coline Devillard
Doha	Uneven Bars	(Belgium) Nina Derwael	(Russia) Uliana Perebinosova	(France) Mélanie de Jesus dos Santos
Doha	Balance Beam	(France) Mélanie de Jesus dos Santos	(France) Marine Boyer	(Belgium) Nina Derwael
Doha	Floor Exercise	(Belgium) Axelle Klinckaert (Italy) Elisa Meneghini (North Korea) Kim Su-jong	—N/a	—N/a
Tokyo	All-Around	(Japan) Mai Murakami	(United States) Trinity Thomas	(France) Mélanie de Jesus dos Santos
Cottbus	Vault	(Brazil) Rebeca Andrade	(United States) Jade Carey	(India) Dipa Karmakar
Cottbus	Uneven Bars	(Belgium) Nina Derwael	(Brazil) Rebeca Andrade	(China) Lyu Jiaqi
Cottbus	Balance Beam	(Brazil) Rebeca Andrade	(Brazil) Flávia Saraiva	(Ukraine) Diana Varinska
Cottbus	Floor Exercise	(Brazil) Flávia Saraiva	(Brazil) Jade Barbosa	(Poland) Marta Pihan-Kulesza

==== World Challenge Cup series ====
Competition	Event	Gold	Silver	Bronze
Osijek	Vault	(Uzbekistan) Oksana Chusovitina	(Slovenia) Tjaša Kysselef	(Russia) Viktoria Trykina
Osijek	Uneven Bars	(Ukraine) Diana Varinska	(Slovakia) Barbora Mokošová	(Hungary) Noémi Makra
Osijek	Balance Beam	(Ukraine) Diana Varinska	(Slovakia) Barbora Mokošová	(Romania) Laura Iacob
Osijek	Floor Exercise	(Ukraine) Diana Varinska	(Hungary) Zsófia Kovács	(Romania) Anamaria Ocolișan
Koper	Vault	(Switzerland) Giulia Steingruber	(Romania) Denisa Golgotă	(Slovenia) Tjaša Kysselef
Koper	Uneven Bars	(Slovakia) Barbora Mokošová	(Netherlands) Céline van Gerner	(Hungary) Dorina Böczögő
Koper	Balance Beam	(Netherlands) Céline van Gerner	(Switzerland) Giulia Steingruber	(Romania) Denisa Golgotă
Koper	Floor Exercise	(Switzerland) Giulia Steingruber	(Romania) Denisa Golgotă	(Slovakia) Barbora Mokošová
Guimarães	Vault	(South Korea) Yeo Seo-jeong	(Poland) Gabriela Janik	(Mexico) Victoria Mata
Guimarães	Uneven Bars	(Mexico) Ahtziri Sandoval	(Portugal) Filipa Martins	(Spain) Helena Bonilla
Guimarães	Balance Beam	(United Kingdom) Maisie Methuen	(Canada) Laurie Denommée	(Canada) Isabela Onyshko
Guimarães	Floor Exercise	(United Kingdom) Maisie Methuen	(Canada) Isabela Onyshko	(Canada) Laurie Denommée
Mersin	Vault	(India) Dipa Karmakar	(Indonesia) Rifda Irfanaluthfi	(Turkey) Göksu Üçtaş
Mersin	Uneven Bars	(Turkey) Demet Mutlu	(Turkey) Tutya Yılmaz	(Chile) Maria del Sol Perez
Mersin	Balance Beam	(Turkey) Göksu Üçtaş	(Turkey) Tutya Yılmaz	(Azerbaijan) Yulia Inshina
Mersin	Floor Exercise	(Turkey) Göksu Üçtaş	(Turkey) Tutya Yılmaz	(Indonesia) Rifda Irfanaluthfi
Szombathely	Vault	(Israel) Ofir Netzer	(Canada) Laurie Denommée	(Czech Republic) Dominika Ponížilová
Szombathely	Uneven Bars	(Sweden) Jonna Adlerteg	(Slovakia) Barbora Mokošová	(Spain) Paula Raya
Szombathely	Balance Beam	(Hungary) Zsófia Kovács	(Spain) Cintia Rodriguez	(Austria) Elisa Haemmerle
Szombathely	Floor Exercise	(Hungary) Dorina Böczögő	(Spain) Cintia Rodriguez	(Slovakia) Barbora Mokošová
Paris	Vault	(Uzbekistan) Oksana Chusovitina	(Canada) Ellie Black	(Slovenia) Tjaša Kysselef
Paris	Uneven Bars	(France) Juliette Bossu	(Sweden) Jonna Adlerteg	(Canada) Ellie Black
Paris	Balance Beam	(Canada) Ellie Black	(France) Marine Boyer	(Spain) Helena Bonilla
Paris	Floor Exercise	(France) Mélanie de Jesus dos Santos	(Canada) Ellie Black	(Czech Republic) Aneta Holasová

===== World Challenge Cup series winners =====
Apparatus	Winner
Vault	(Israel) Ofir Netzer
Uneven Bars	(Slovakia) Barbora Mokošová
Balance Beam	(Ukraine) Diana Varinska
Floor Exercise	(Hungary) Dorina Böczögő

== See also ==
- 2018 FIG Rhythmic Gymnastics World Cup series
