= Turkey men's national artistic gymnastics team =

Turkey men's national gymnastics team
- Continental union: European Gymnastics Union

Olympic Games
- Appearances: 1

World Championships

Junior World Championships
- Appearances: 2

European Championships
- Medals: Silver: 2020, 2023; Bronze: 2022

The Turkey men's national artistic gymnastics team represents Turkey in FIG international competitions.

== History ==
Aleko Mulos was the first ever Turkish man to compete at the Olympic Games, doing so in 1908. Turkey fielded their first Olympic team at the 2024 Olympic Games; previously they had individual athletes compete at the 2016 and 2020 Olympic Games. At the 2020 Olympic Games Ferhat Arıcan became the first Turkish male gymnast to win an Olympic medal, earning bronze on the parallel bars.

== Current senior roster ==
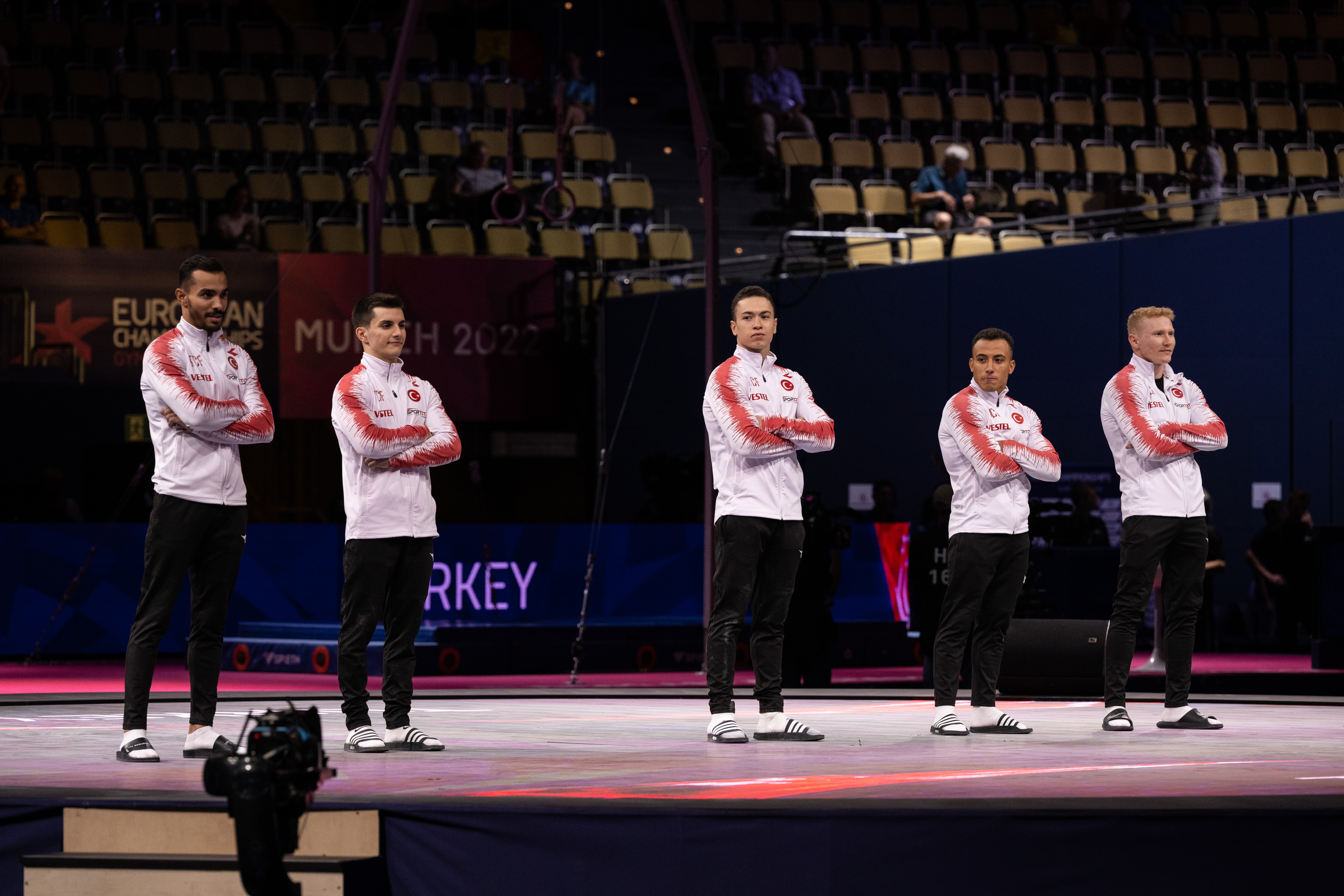
Turkish team at the 2022 European Championships

Name	Birthdate and age	Hometown
Ferhat Arıcan	28 July 1993 (age 33)	İzmir
Adem Asil	21 February 1999 (age 27)	Alexandria, Egypt
Alperen Ege Avcı	21 April 2006 (age 20)	Osmangazi
Hasan Bulut	21 August 2003 (age 23)	Melikgazi
İbrahim Çolak	7 January 1995 (age 31)	Konak
Sercan Demir	1999	Bolu
Emre Dodanlı	24 October 2002 (age 24)	Milton, Ontario
Altan Doğan	7 June 2005 (age 21)	Konak
Yunus Gündogdu	1997	Muğla
Mert Efe Kılıçer	17 November 2004 (age 22)	Yenimahalle, Ankara
Mehmet Koşak	4 January 2001 (age 25)	Konak
Kerem Şener	2003	Konak
Liu Tuakli	1 July 2004 (age 22)	İzmir

== Team competition results ==
=== Olympic Games ===
- 2024 — 9th place (did not qualify for team final)
  Ferhat Arıcan, Adem Asil, İbrahim Çolak, Emre Dodanlı, Ahmet Önder

=== World Championships ===
- 2014 – 25th place (did not qualify for team final)
  Ferhat Arıcan, Abdulkadir Bas, Coşkun Boncuk, İbrahim Çolak, Ahmet Önder, Ümit Şamiloğlu
- 2018 – 15th place (did not qualify for team final)
  Mustafa Arca, Ferhat Arıcan, İbrahim Çolak, Ahmet Önder, Ümit Şamiloğlu
- 2019 – 15th place (did not qualify for team final)
  Mustafa Arca, Ferhat Arıcan, İbrahim Çolak, Yunus Gündoğdu, Ahmet Önder
- 2022 – 11th place (did not qualify for team final)
  Ferhat Arıcan, Adem Asil, Yunus Gündoğdu, Mehmet Koşak, Ahmet Önder
- 2023 – 10th place (did not qualify for team final)
  Ferhat Arıcan, Adem Asil, Emre Dodanlı, Mehmet Koşak, Ahmet Önder

=== Junior World Championships ===
- 2019 — 16th place
  Emre Dodanlı, Kerem Şener, Bora Tarhan
- 2023 – 10th place
  Alperen Ege Avci, Ahmet Burak Ekici, Volkan Arda Hamarat
- 2025 – 29th place
  Melih Dumlu, Ege Ertöz, Umut Ors

== Most decorated gymnasts ==
This list includes all Turkish male artistic gymnasts who have won a medal at the Olympic Games or the World Artistic Gymnastics Championships.

Rank	Gymnast	Team	AA	FX	PH	SR	VT	PB	HB	Olympic Total	World Total	Total
1	Adem Asil					2022; 2025				0	2	2
2	İbrahim Çolak					2019				0	1	1
3	Ahmet Önder							2019		0	1	1
4	Ferhat Arıcan							2020		1	0	1

== See also ==
- Turkey women's national artistic gymnastics team
- List of Olympic male artistic gymnasts for Turkey
- Turkey at the Olympics
