= Ferhat Arıcan =

Turkish artistic gymnast

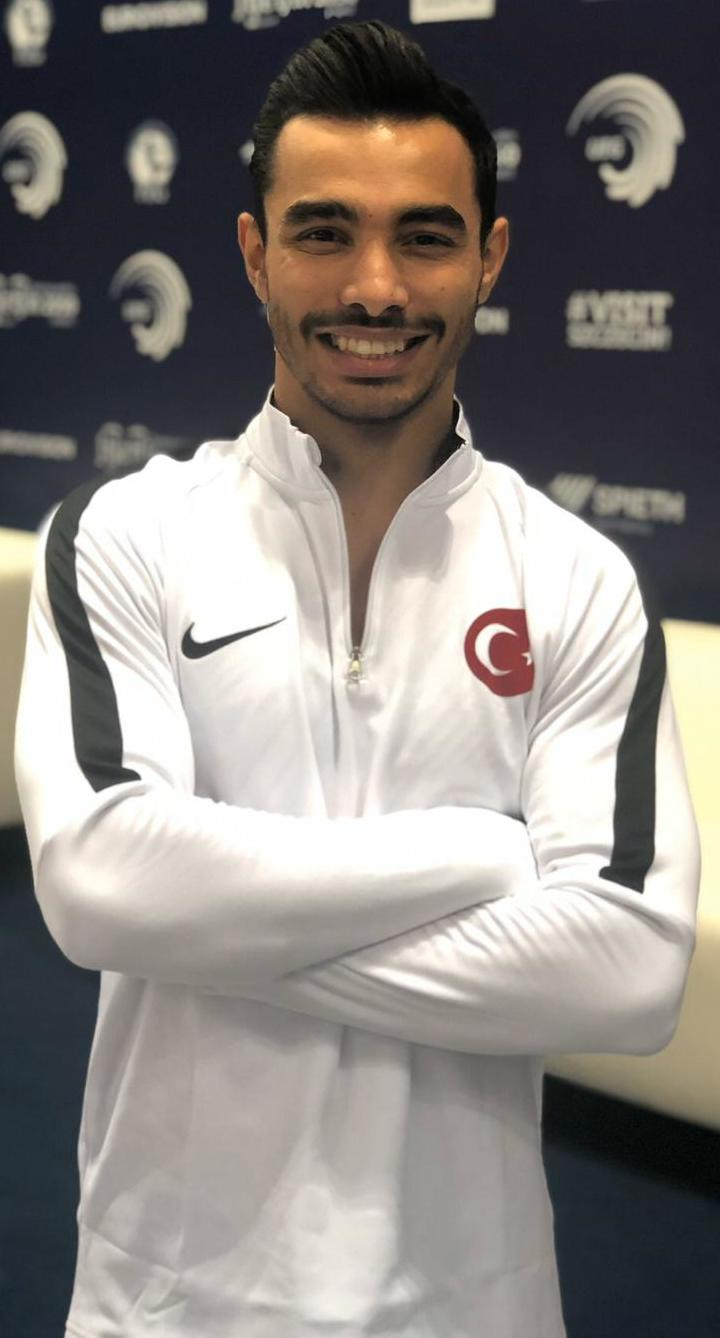
- Arıcan in 2020

Personal information
- Born: 28 July 1993 (age 33) İzmir, Turkey
- Height: 178 cm (5 ft 10 in)

Gymnastics career
- Discipline: Men's artistic gymnastics
- Country represented: Turkey; (2010–present)
- Club: Göztepe
- Head coaches: Yilmaz Goktekin; Ievgeni Kozin
Medal record
Men's artistic gymnastics
Representing Turkey
Olympic Games
Bronze medal – third place	2020 Tokyo	Parallel bars
European Games
Bronze medal – third place	2019 Minsk	Parallel bars
European Championships
Gold medal – first place	2020 Mersin	Parallel bars
Gold medal – first place	2021 Basel	Parallel bars
Silver medal – second place	2020 Mersin	Team
Silver medal – second place	2023 Antalya	Team
Silver medal – second place	2023 Antalya	Parallel bars
Silver medal – second place	2026 Zagreb	Parallel bars
Bronze medal – third place	2019 Szczecin	Parallel bars
Bronze medal – third place	2020 Mersin	Pommel horse
Bronze medal – third place	2022 Munich	Team
Mediterranean Games
Gold medal – first place	2022 Oran	Team
Gold medal – first place	2022 Oran	Parallel bars
Gold medal – first place	2026 Taranto	Team
Silver medal – second place	2018 Tarragona	Team
Bronze medal – third place	2013 Mersin	Parallel bars
Bronze medal – third place	2018 Tarragona	Vault
Bronze medal – third place	2022 Oran	Pommel horse
Bronze medal – third place	2026 Taranto	Pommel horse
Islamic Solidarity Games
Gold medal – first place	2017 Baku	Team
Gold medal – first place	2017 Baku	Parallel bars
Gold medal – first place	2021 Konya	Team
Gold medal – first place	2021 Konya	Parallel bars
Bronze medal – third place	2021 Konya	Pommel horse
Youth Olympic Games
Silver medal – second place	2010 Singapore	Vault

Ferhat Arıcan (born 28 July 1993) is a Turkish artistic gymnast. He represented Turkey at the 2016, 2020, and 2024 Olympic Games. At the 2020 Olympic Games he became the first Turkish gymnast to win an Olympic medal, winning bronze on the parallel bars.

== Personal life ==
Arıcan was born in Konak, İzmir in 1993. He took up gymnastics when he was 9–10 years old. He studied sports administration at Ege University.

== Gymnastics career ==
=== 2010–2013 ===
Arıcan was selected to represent Turkey at the inaugural Youth Olympic Games. He won silver on vault behind Ganbatyn Erdenebold of Mongolia. He would make his senior debut at the 2010 World Championships later that year and also competed at the 2011 World Championships.

Arıcan competed at the 2013 European Championships where he finished 23rd in the all-around. At the 2013 Mediterranean Games he won bronze on parallel bars.

=== 2014–2016 ===
Arıcan competed at the 2014 World Championships in Nanning, China. He was originally a reserve athlete for the all-around; however he was called up to compete when Alexander Shatilov withdrew. He placed twenty-third.

At the 2015 European Championships Arıcan placed 24th in the all-around and seventh on parallel bars. At the 2015 European Games he placed eleventh in the all-around and sixth on vault and parallel bars. At the World Championships he placed 53rd in the all-around during qualifications.

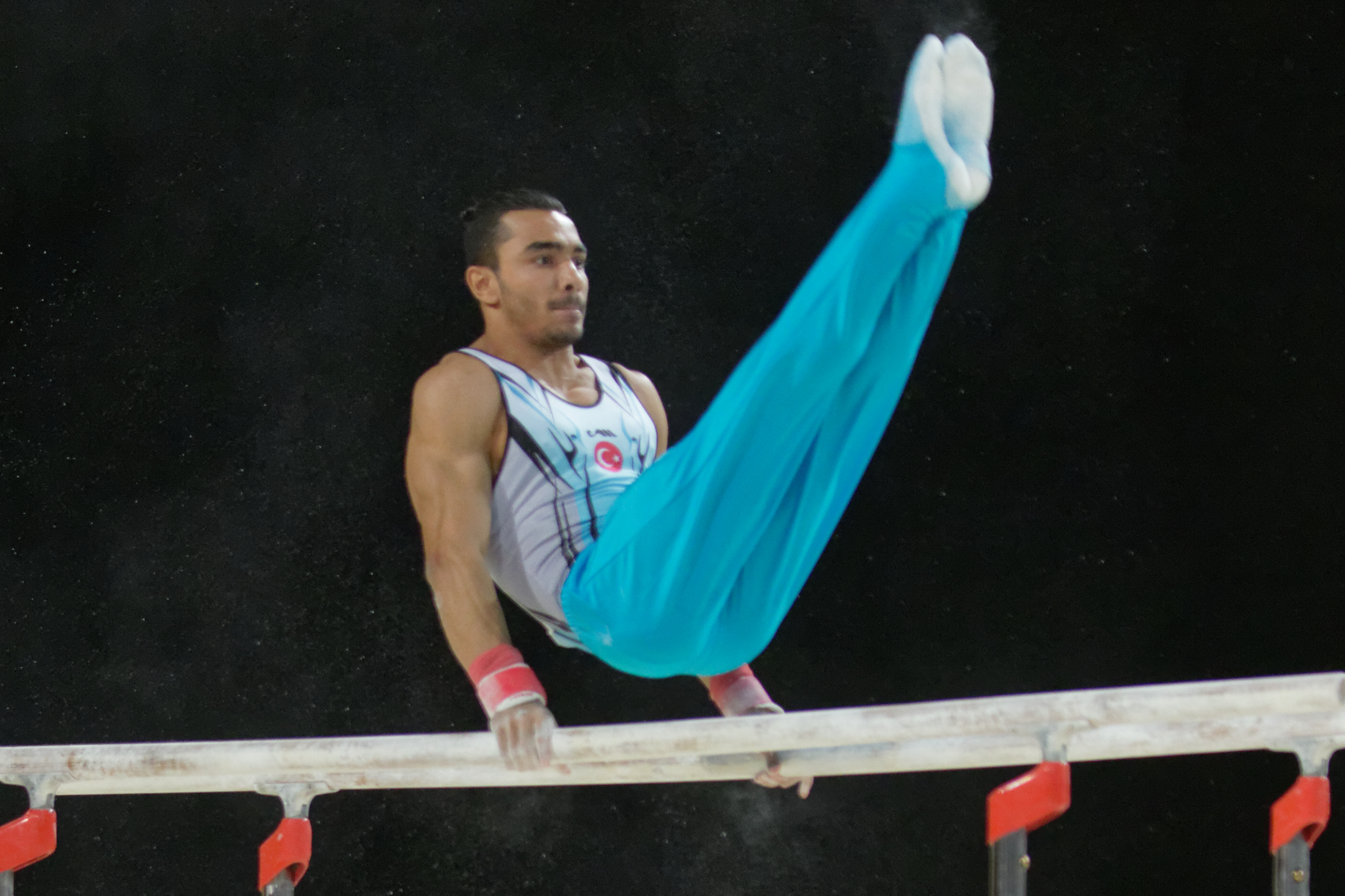
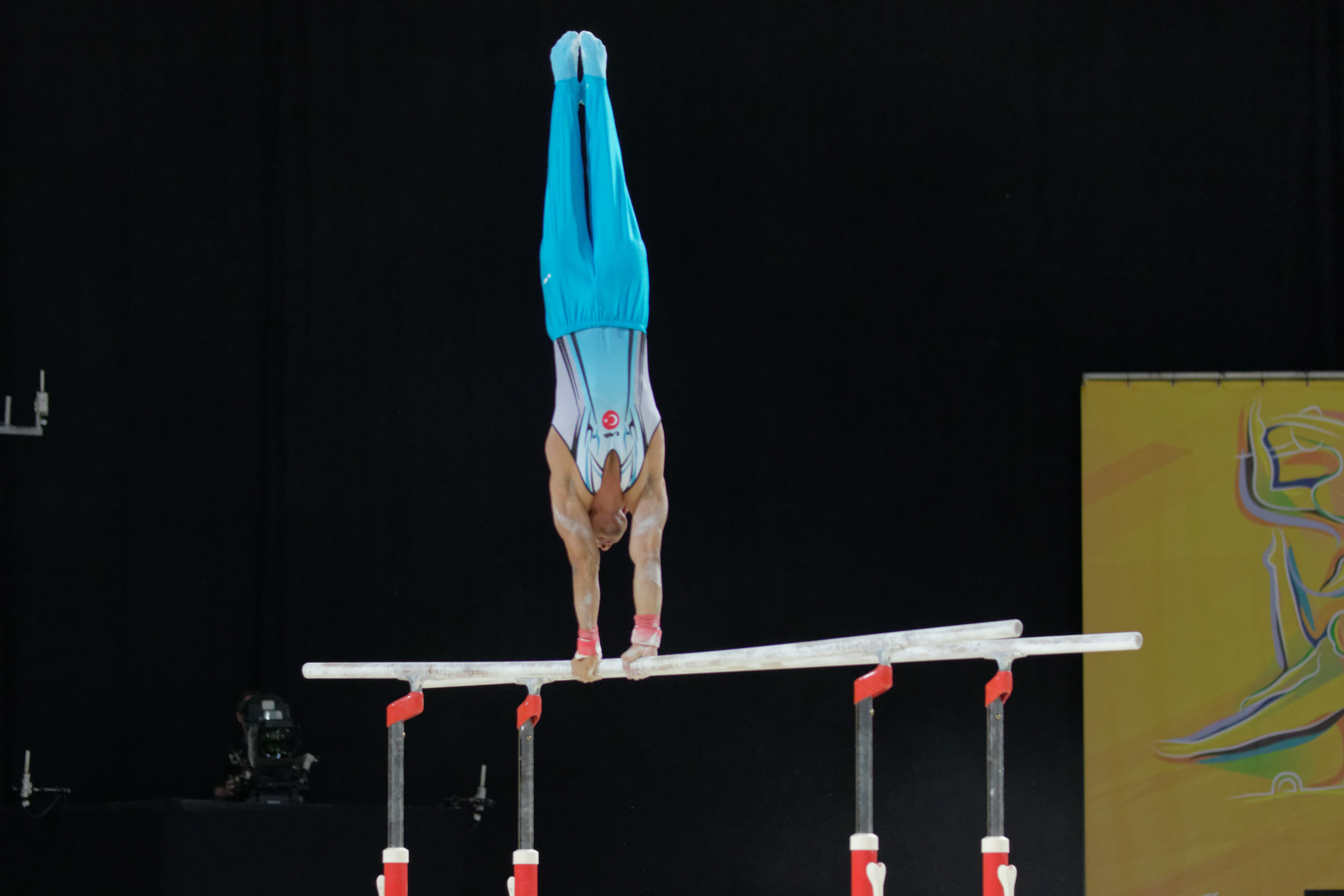
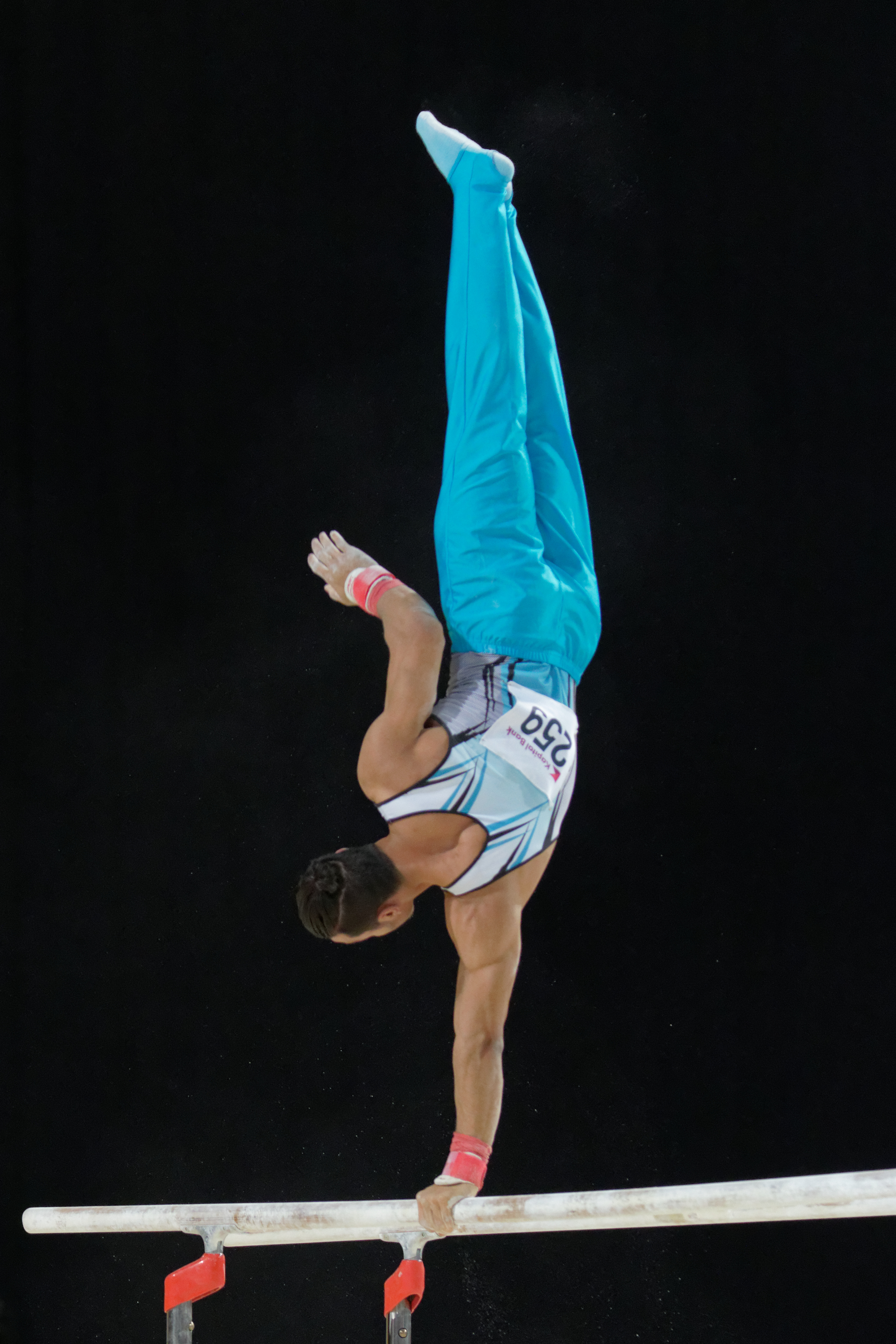
Arıcan on the parallel bars at the 2015 European Championships

Arıcan competed at the Olympic Test Event in early 2016 where he earned an individual berth to compete at the upcoming Olympic Games. In doing so he became the first Turkish male gymnast in 108 to qualify to compete at the Olympics after Aleko Mulos did so in 1908. At the 2016 Olympic Games Arıcan placed 41st in the all-around during qualifications and did not qualify for any event finals.

=== 2017–2019 ===
At the 2017 European Championships Arıcan placed eighth in the all-around and on pommel horse and placed seventh on the parallel bars. He competed at the 2017 Islamic Solidarity Games alongside Ahmet Önder and İbrahim Çolak; they finished first as a team. Individually Arıcan placed first on parallel bars and second on horizontal bar. At the 2017 World Championships Arıcan placed twentieth in the all-around and also qualified to his first apparatus event final, the parallel bars. He finished eighth on the event.

Arıcan competed at the 2018 World Cups in Baku and Doha and the World Challenge Cups in Koper and Mersin; he earned five bronze medals. At the 2018 Mediterranean Games he helped Turkey place second as a team and individually he won bronze on the parallel bars. Arıcan placed nineteenth in the all-around at the 2018 World Championships.

Arıcan competed at the 2019 World Cups in Melbourne, Baku, and Doha. At the 2019 European Championships He placed tenth in the all-around and fifth on pommel horse but won his first European medal, a bronze on parallel bars. Arıcan next competed at the 2019 European Games where he won another bronze on parallel bars. At the 2019 World Championships he placed fifth on the event.

=== 2020–2021 ===
Arıcan competed at the 2020 Baku World Cup; however the competition was canceled after qualifications due to the COVID-19 pandemic. Many other competitions were either canceled or postponed throughout the year. In December the European Championships were held. Arıcan helped Turkey win the silver medal behind Ukraine in the team competition. Individually Arıcan won gold on the parallel bars and bronze on pommel horse.

Arıcan defended his parallel bars title at the 2021 European Championships. He also picked up gold medals on the apparatus at the 2021 Osijek Challenge Cup and the Doha World Cup.

Arıcan competed at the postponed-2020 Olympic Games in Tokyo. He won the bronze medal on the parallel bars behind Zou Jingyuan and Lukas Dauser. With this medal he became the first athlete representing Turkey to earn an Olympic Medal in artistic gymnastics.

=== 2022–2024 ===
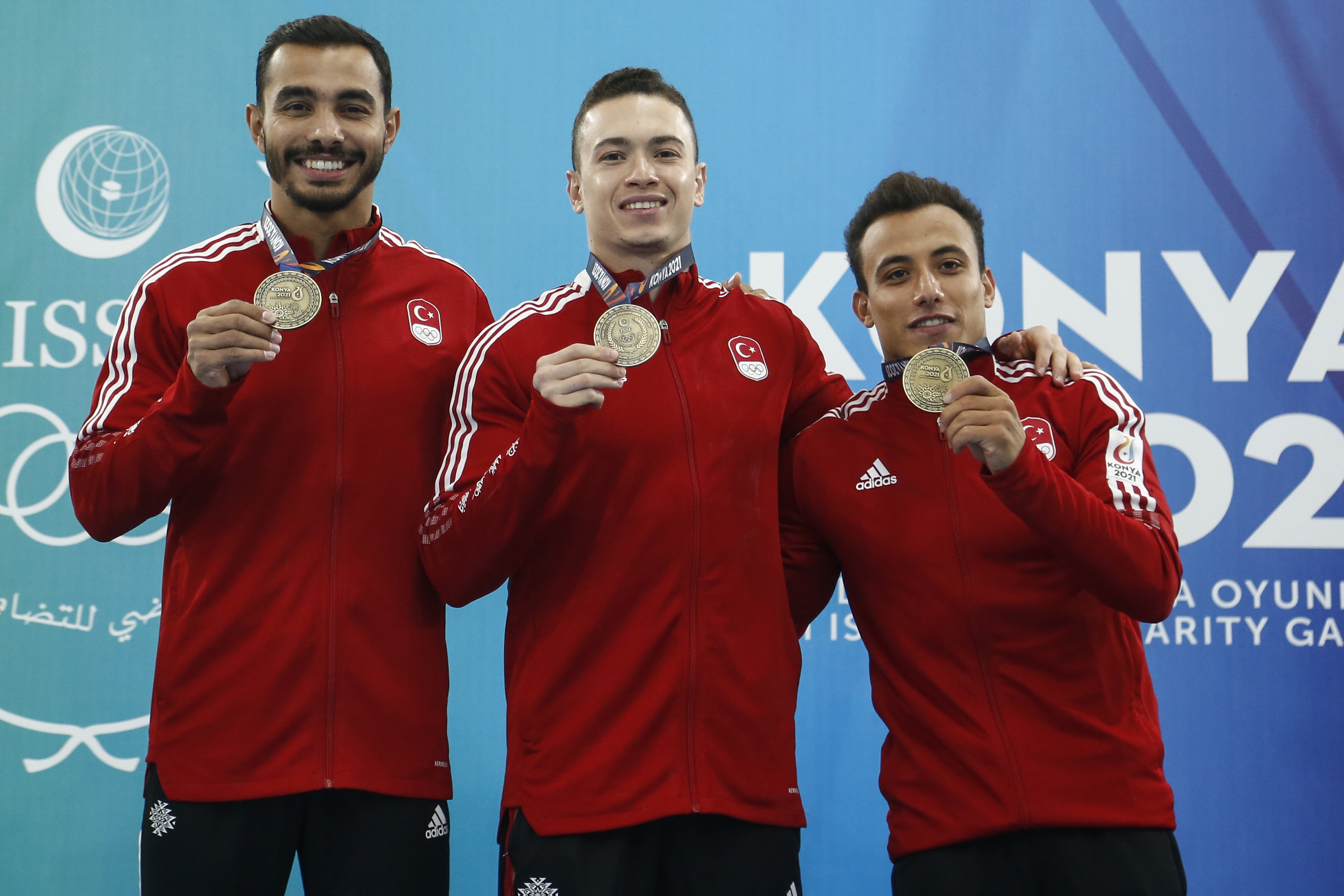
Arıcan (left) at the Islamic Solidarity Games

Arıcan began the year competing at the 2022 World Cups in Cottbus, Cairo, and Baku and the World Challenge Cup in Osijek; he earned one gold medal and two silver medals on the parallel bars. He competed at the Mediterranean Games where he helped Turkey win gold in the team competition. Additionally he won gold on parallel bars and bronze on pommel horse. Arıcan next competed at the Islamic Solidarity Games alongside Adem Asil and Ahmet Önder; together they won gold as a team. Individually Arıcan once again won gold on parallel bars and bronze on pommel horse. He next competed at the 2022 European Championships where he helped Turkey win team bronze behind Great Britain and Italy. Individually Arıcan placed fifth on pommel horse and seventh on the parallel bars. At the 2022 World Championships he placed fourth on parallel bars.

At the 2023 European Championships Arıcan helped Turkey place second Italy; individually he won silver on the parallel bars behind Illia Kovtun. At the 2023 World Championships Arıcan helped Turkey finished 10th as a team during qualifications; in doing so, Turkey qualified a full team to the Olympic Games for the first time.

Arıcan was selected to represent Turkey and the 2024 Olympic Games alongside Adem Asil, İbrahim Çolak, Emre Dodanlı, and Ahmet Önder. During the qualification round Turkey finished ninth. Individually Arıcan qualified to the parallel bars final where he finished fifth.

=== 2025 ===
Arıcan competed at various World Cups and World Challenge Cups in 2025, winning gold on parallel bars in Antalya and Varna and bronze in Osijek.

== Competitive history ==
Competitive history of Ferhat Arıcan
Year	Event	Team	AA	FX	PH	SR	VT	PB	HB
2010
2010	Junior European Championships							6	
2010	Youth Olympic Games						2nd place, silver medalist(s)		
2010
2010	World Championships		114						
2011
2011	World Championships		104						
2013
2013	European Championships		23						
2013	Mediterranean Games		6				5	3rd place, bronze medalist(s)	
2013	World Championships				67			103	
2014	Cottbus World Cup				17			25	
2014	European Championships	19							
2014	World Championships		23						
2015	Cottbus World Cup							17	
2015	Doha World Cup						6	7	
2015	European Championships		24					7	
2015	Varna Challenge Cup			6	4		7	2nd place, silver medalist(s)	
2015	European Games		11				6	6	
2015	Osijek Challenge Cup							2nd place, silver medalist(s)	
2015	World Championships		53						
2016	Baku World Cup				6			2nd place, silver medalist(s)	
2016	Doha World Cup			7				6	
2016	Olympic Test Event		11					2nd place, silver medalist(s)	
2016	European Championships	11							
2016	Mersin Challenge Cup			1st place, gold medalist(s)	2nd place, silver medalist(s)		4	1st place, gold medalist(s)	
2016	Olympic Games		41						
2017	Melbourne World Cup			3rd place, bronze medalist(s)	5		8	3rd place, bronze medalist(s)	6
2017	Doha World Cup			7	4		5	4	
2017	European Championships		8		8			7	
2017	Islamic Solidarity Games	1st place, gold medalist(s)						1st place, gold medalist(s)	2nd place, silver medalist(s)
2017	Szombathely Challenge Cup							2nd place, silver medalist(s)	
2017	World Championships		20					8	
2018	Baku World Cup							3rd place, bronze medalist(s)	
2018	Doha World Cup			8	7		3rd place, bronze medalist(s)	3rd place, bronze medalist(s)	
2018	Koper Challenge Cup						10		
2018	Mediterranean Games	2nd place, silver medalist(s)					3rd place, bronze medalist(s)		
2018	Mersin Challenge Cup			3rd place, bronze medalist(s)	6		6	3rd place, bronze medalist(s)	
2018	European Championships							10	
2018	Paris Challenge Cup							6	
2018	World Championships		19						
2018	Cottbus World Cup							3rd place, bronze medalist(s)	
2019	Melbourne World Cup				5			3rd place, bronze medalist(s)	
2019	Turkish Championships			2nd place, silver medalist(s)	1st place, gold medalist(s)			1st place, gold medalist(s)	1st place, gold medalist(s)
2019	Baku World Cup							2nd place, silver medalist(s)	
2019	Doha World Cup							6	
2019	European Championships		10		5			3rd place, bronze medalist(s)	
2019	European Games		9					3rd place, bronze medalist(s)	
2019	Mersin Challenge Cup				2nd place, silver medalist(s)			1st place, gold medalist(s)	
2019	World Championships		33					5	
2019	Cottbus World Cup							6	
2020	Turkish Championships				1st place, gold medalist(s)			1st place, gold medalist(s)	
2020	Baku World Cup							3rd place, bronze medalist(s)	
2020	European Championships	2nd place, silver medalist(s)			3rd place, bronze medalist(s)		6	1st place, gold medalist(s)	
2021	Turkish Championships				3rd place, bronze medalist(s)			2nd place, silver medalist(s)	
2021	European Championships							1st place, gold medalist(s)	
2021	Osijek Challenge Cup				4			1st place, gold medalist(s)	
2021	Doha World Cup				7			1st place, gold medalist(s)	
2021	Olympic Games							3rd place, bronze medalist(s)	
2022	Cottbus World Cup				15				
2022	Cairo World Cup							2nd place, silver medalist(s)	
2022	Baku World Cup							2nd place, silver medalist(s)	
2022	Osijek Challenge Cup				6			1st place, gold medalist(s)	
2022	Mediterranean Games	1st place, gold medalist(s)			3rd place, bronze medalist(s)			1st place, gold medalist(s)	
2022	Islamic Solidarity Games	1st place, gold medalist(s)			3rd place, bronze medalist(s)			1st place, gold medalist(s)	
2022	European Championships	3rd place, bronze medalist(s)			5			7	
2022	Paris Challenge Cup				8			6	
2022	Mersin Challenge Cup				2nd place, silver medalist(s)			1st place, gold medalist(s)	
2022	World Championships	11						4	
2023	DTB Pokal Team Challenge	3rd place, bronze medalist(s)			4			3rd place, bronze medalist(s)	
2023	European Championships	2nd place, silver medalist(s)						2nd place, silver medalist(s)	
2023	World Championships	10							
2024	Turkish Championships				3rd place, bronze medalist(s)			2nd place, silver medalist(s)	
2024	Olympic Games	9						5	
2025	Antalya World Cup							1st place, gold medalist(s)	
2025	Osijek World Cup							3rd place, bronze medalist(s)	
2025	Varna World Challenge Cup							1st place, gold medalist(s)	
2025	European Championships							7	
2025	Szombathely World Challenge Cup				1st place, gold medalist(s)			1st place, gold medalist(s)	
2025	World Championships							R1	
2026	Antalya World Cup							3rd place, bronze medalist(s)	
2026	Osijek World Cup							3rd place, bronze medalist(s)	
2026	European Championships							2nd place, silver medalist(s)	
2026	Mediterranean Games	1st place, gold medalist(s)			3rd place, bronze medalist(s)				
2026	Paris World Challenge Cup							1st place, gold medalist(s)	
