= 2022 FIG Artistic Gymnastics World Cup series =

International gymnastics competition series

FIG Artistic Gymnastics World Cup series
- Location: various — see locations
- Date: February 24 – October 9, 2022 see schedule

The 2022 FIG World Cup circuit in Artistic Gymnastics is a series of competitions officially organized and promoted by the International Gymnastics Federation (FIG) in 2022. Due to the 2022 Russian invasion of Ukraine, the International Gymnastics Federation implemented restrictions regarding the use of Russian and Belarusian anthems and flags for the competitions in Cottbus and Doha. Starting March 7, the FIG banned Russian and Belarusian athletes and officials from taking part in FIG-sanctioned competitions.

== Schedule ==
=== World Cup series ===
Date	Location	Event	Type
February 24–27	(Germany) Cottbus	FIG World Cup 2022	C III – Apparatus
March 2–5	(Qatar) Doha	FIG World Cup 2022	C III – Apparatus
March 17–20	(Egypt) Cairo	FIG World Cup 2022	C III – Apparatus
March 31–April 4	(Azerbaijan) Baku	FIG World Cup 2022	C III – Apparatus

=== World Challenge Cup series ===
Date	Location	Event	Type
May 26–29	(Bulgaria) Varna	FIG World Challenge Cup 2022	C III – Apparatus
June 9–12	(Croatia) Osijek	FIG World Challenge Cup 2022	C III – Apparatus
June 16–19	(Slovenia) Koper	FIG World Challenge Cup 2022	C III – Apparatus
September 24–25	(France) Paris	FIG World Challenge Cup 2022	C III – Apparatus
September 30–October 2	(Hungary) Szombathely	FIG World Challenge Cup 2022	C III – Apparatus
October 7–9	(Turkey) Mersin	FIG World Challenge Cup 2022	C III – Apparatus

== Series winners ==
Apparatus	Apparatus World Cup	World Challenge Cup
Apparatus	Winner	
Men
Floor Exercise	(Israel) Artem Dolgopyat	(Chinese Taipei) Tang Chia-hung
Pommel Horse	(Kazakhstan) Nariman Kurbanov	(Chinese Taipei) Shiao Yu-jan
Rings	(Armenia) Vahagn Davtyan	(Turkey) Adem Asil
Vault	(Armenia) Artur Davtyan	(Romania) Gabriel Burtănete
Parallel Bars	(Ukraine) Illia Kovtun	(Turkey) Ferhat Arıcan
Horizontal Bar	(Israel) Alexander Myakinin	(Croatia) Tin Srbić
Women
Vault	(Uzbekistan) Oksana Chusovitina	(Slovenia) Teja Belak
Uneven Bars	(Ukraine) Daniela Batrona	(Hungary) Zója Székely
Balance Beam	(Ukraine) Daniela Batrona	(Croatia) Ana Đerek
Floor Exercise	(Hungary) Dorina Böczögő	(Croatia) Ana Đerek

== Medalists ==
=== Men ===
==== World Cup series ====
Competition	Event	Gold	Silver	Bronze
Cottbus	Floor Exercise	Yahor Sharamkou	(Croatia) Aurel Benović	(Italy) Thomas Grasso
Cottbus	Pommel Horse	(Croatia) Filip Ude	(Ukraine) Illia Kovtun	(United States) Brody Malone
Cottbus	Rings	(Turkey) İbrahim Çolak	(Armenia) Vahagn Davtyan	(United Kingdom) Courtney Tulloch
Cottbus	Vault	(Armenia) Artur Davtyan	(Ukraine) Nazar Chepurnyi	(Turkey) Adem Asil
Cottbus	Parallel Bars	(Ukraine) Illia Kovtun	(Australia) Mitchell Morgans	(United States) Brody Malone
Cottbus	Horizontal Bar	(United States) Brody Malone	(Croatia) Tin Srbić	(Israel) Alexander Myakinin
Doha	Floor Exercise	(Israel) Artem Dolgopyat	(Ukraine) Illia Kovtun	(Croatia) Aurel Benović
Doha	Pommel Horse	(Kazakhstan) Nariman Kurbanov	(Republic of Ireland) Rhys McClenaghan	(Armenia) Harutyun Merdinyan
Doha	Rings	(Armenia) Vahagn Davtyan	(Armenia) Artur Avetisyan	(Azerbaijan) Nikita Simonov
Doha	Vault	(Armenia) Artur Davtyan	(Ukraine) Nazar Chepurnyi	(Australia) James Bacueti
Doha	Parallel Bars	(Ukraine) Illia Kovtun	(Kazakhstan) Milad Karimi	(Azerbaijan) Ivan Tikhonov (Note: Ivan Kuliak, a neutral athlete, was stripped of his bronze medal and prize money after being sanctioned for wearing pro-war symbolism on the medal podium in relation to Russia's ongoing war with Ukraine.)
Doha	Horizontal Bar	(Israel) Alexander Myakinin	(Lithuania) Robert Tvorogal	(Ukraine) Illia Kovtun
Cairo	Floor Exercise	(Israel) Artem Dolgopyat	(United States) Paul Juda	(Republic of Ireland) Adam Steele
Cairo	Pommel Horse	(Republic of Ireland) Rhys McClenaghan	(Armenia) Harutyun Merdinyan	(Jordan) Ahmad Abu al Soud
Cairo	Rings	(Armenia) Vahagn Davtyan	(Turkey) İbrahim Çolak	(Italy) Salvatore Maresca
Cairo	Vault	(Armenia) Artur Davtyan	(Ukraine) Nazar Chepurnyi	(Israel) Artem Dolgopyat
Cairo	Parallel Bars	(Ukraine) Illia Kovtun	(Turkey) Ferhat Arıcan	(Cyprus) Ilias Georgiou
Cairo	Horizontal Bar	(Italy) Carlo Macchini	(United States) Paul Juda	(Israel) Alexander Myakinin
Baku	Floor Exercise	(Israel) Artem Dolgopyat	(Kazakhstan) Milad Karimi	(Republic of Ireland) Eamon Montgomery
Baku	Pommel Horse	(Kazakhstan) Nariman Kurbanov	(Albania) Matvei Petrov	(France) Cyril Tommasone
Baku	Rings	(Italy) Salvatore Maresca	(Turkey) İbrahim Çolak	(Azerbaijan) Nikita Simonov
Baku	Vault	(Ukraine) Nazar Chepurnyi	(Israel) Andrey Medvedev	(Israel) Artem Dolgopyat
Baku	Parallel Bars	(Ukraine) Illia Kovtun	(Turkey) Ferhat Arıcan	(United Kingdom) Joe Fraser
Baku	Horizontal Bar	(United Kingdom) Joe Fraser	(Australia) Mitchell Morgans	(Ukraine) Illia Kovtun

==== World Challenge Cup series ====
Competition	Event	Gold	Silver	Bronze
Varna	Floor Exercise	(France) Benjamin Osberger	(United States) Taylor Burkhart	(Bulgaria) Teodor Trifonov
Varna	Pommel Horse	(Cyprus) Marios Georgiou	(Croatia) Mateo Žugec	(Jordan) Ahmad Abu al Soud
Varna	Rings	(Azerbaijan) Nikita Simonov	(United Kingdom) Courtney Tulloch	(Turkey) Yunus Gündoğdu
Varna	Vault	(Romania) Gabriel Burtănete	(United States) Taylor Burkhart	(United Kingdom) Courtney Tulloch
Varna	Parallel Bars	(Cyprus) Marios Georgiou	(Colombia) Dilan Jiménez	(Germany) Marcel Nguyen
Varna	Horizontal Bar	(Cyprus) Marios Georgiou	(Germany) Carlo Hoerr	(Colombia) Andrés Martínez
Osijek	Floor Exercise	(Croatia) Aurel Benović	(Turkey) Adem Asil	(Germany) Tom Schultze
Osijek	Pommel Horse	(Croatia) Robert Seligman	(Turkey) Ahmet Önder	(Brazil) Caio Souza
Osijek	Rings	(Turkey) Adem Asil	(Brazil) Caio Souza	(Azerbaijan) Nikita Simonov
Osijek	Vault	(Ukraine) Igor Radivilov	(Brazil) Caio Souza	(Turkey) Adem Asil
Osijek	Parallel Bars	(Turkey) Ferhat Arıcan	(Switzerland) Noe Seifert	(Azerbaijan) Ivan Tikhonov
Osijek	Horizontal Bar	(Croatia) Tin Srbić	(Brazil) Lucas Bittencourt	(Brazil) Caio Souza
Koper	Floor Exercise	(United Kingdom) Harry Hepworth	(United States) Riley Loos	(United States) Taylor Burkhart
Koper	Pommel Horse	(Croatia) Mateo Žugec	(Ukraine) Petro Pakhniuk	(Hungary) Krisztofer Mészáros
Koper	Rings	(Ukraine) Igor Radivilov	(United States) Riley Loos	(Canada) Félix Blaquière
Koper	Vault	(Ukraine) Igor Radivilov	(United Kingdom) Harry Hepworth	(United States) Taylor Burkhart
Koper	Parallel Bars	(Ukraine) Petro Pakhniuk	(Romania) Andrei Muntean	(Hungary) Krisztián Balázs
Koper	Horizontal Bar	(Australia) Tyson Bull	(Italy) Carlo Macchini	(Spain) Joshua Williams
Paris	Floor Exercise	(Republic of Ireland) Eamon Montgomery	(Chinese Taipei) Tang Chia-hung	(France) Benjamin Osberger
Paris	Pommel Horse	(Republic of Ireland) Rhys McClenaghan	(Kazakhstan) Nariman Kurbanov	(Chinese Taipei) Shiao Yu-jan
Paris	Rings	(Turkey) Adem Asil	(Austria) Vinzenz Höck	(United States) Donnell Whittenburg
Paris	Vault	(Turkey) Adem Asil	(Brazil) Caio Souza	(Israel) Artem Dolgopyat
Paris	Parallel Bars	(Brazil) Caio Souza	(United States) Brody Malone	(United States) Donnell Whittenburg
Paris	Horizontal Bar	(United States) Brody Malone	(Cyprus) Ilias Georgiou	(Croatia) Tin Srbić
Szombathely	Floor Exercise	(Ukraine) Illia Kovtun	(Kazakhstan) Milad Karimi	(Japan) Koga Hiramatsu
Szombathely	Pommel Horse	(Kazakhstan) Nariman Kurbanov	(Chinese Taipei) Shiao Yu-jan	(Japan) Koga Hiramatsu
Szombathely	Rings	(Austria) Vinzenz Höck	(Japan) Minori Haruki	(Japan) Soichiro Tanabe
Szombathely	Vault	(Chinese Taipei) Tseng Wei-sheng	(Canada) Leandre Sauve	(Jordan) Saleem Naghouj
Szombathely	Parallel Bars	(Ukraine) Illia Kovtun	(Japan) Minori Haruki	(Spain) Thierno Diallo
Szombathely	Horizontal Bar	(Hungary) Krisztofer Mészáros	(Hungary) Krisztián Balázs	(Bulgaria) Yordan Aleksandrov
Mersin	Floor Exercise	(Kazakhstan) Dmitriy Patanin	(Turkey) Adem Asil	(Chinese Taipei) Tang Chia-hung
Mersin	Pommel Horse	(Chinese Taipei) Shiao Yu-jan	(Turkey) Ferhat Arıcan	(Czech Republic) Radomír Sliž
Mersin	Rings	(Turkey) Adem Asil	(Chinese Taipei) Lin Guan-yi	(Turkey) İbrahim Çolak
Mersin	Vault	(Romania) Gabriel Burtănete	(Canada) Leandre Sauve	(Chinese Taipei) Tseng Wei-sheng
Mersin	Parallel Bars	(Turkey) Ferhat Arıcan	(Lithuania) Robert Tvorogal	(Romania) Andrei Muntean
Mersin	Horizontal Bar	(Lithuania) Robert Tvorogal	(Turkey) Adem Asil	(Bulgaria) Yordan Aleksandrov

=== Women ===
==== World Cup series ====
Competition	Event	Gold	Silver	Bronze
Cottbus	Vault	(Slovenia) Tjaša Kysselef	(Israel) Ofir Netzer	(Spain) Alba Petisco
Cottbus	Uneven Bars	(Netherlands) Tisha Volleman	(Netherlands) Sanna Veerman	Anastasiya Smantsar
Cottbus	Balance Beam	(Ukraine) Daniela Batrona	(Czech Republic) Lucie Trnková	Anastasiya Smantsar
Cottbus	Floor Exercise	(Spain) Alba Petisco	Anastasiya Smantsar	(Netherlands) Tisha Volleman
Doha	Vault	(Uzbekistan) Oksana Chusovitina	(Hungary) Csenge Bácskay	Viktoria Listunova
Doha	Uneven Bars	Viktoria Listunova	Maria Minaeva	(Ukraine) Daniela Batrona
Doha	Balance Beam	Vladislava Urazova	(Hungary) Nora Peresztegi	(Hong Kong) Angel Wong
Doha	Floor Exercise	Maria Minaeva	(Ukraine) Daniela Batrona	(Hungary) Dorina Böczögő
Cairo	Vault	(Slovenia) Tjaša Kysselef	(Uzbekistan) Oksana Chusovitina	(Canada) Laurie Denommée
Cairo	Uneven Bars	(South Africa) Caitlin Rooskrantz	(Canada) Laurie Denommée	(Norway) Mari Kanter
Cairo	Balance Beam	(Ukraine) Yuliia Kasianenko	(Hungary) Zsófia Kóvacs	(Ukraine) Daniela Batrona
Cairo	Floor Exercise	(Hungary) Dorina Böczögő	(Uzbekistan) Dildora Aripova	(Canada) Laurie Denommée
Baku	Vault	(Uzbekistan) Oksana Chusovitina	(Hungary) Csenge Bácskay	(Slovenia) Teja Belak
Baku	Uneven Bars	(France) Lorette Charpy	(Netherlands) Naomi Visser	(Netherlands) Vera van Pol
Baku	Balance Beam	(Germany) Sarah Voss	(France) Lorette Charpy	(Ukraine) Daniela Batrona
Baku	Floor Exercise	(Brazil) Júlia Soares	(Hungary) Dorina Böczögő	(Uzbekistan) Dildora Aripova

==== World Challenge Cup series ====
Competition	Event	Gold	Silver	Bronze
Varna	Vault	(France) Aline Friess	(Denmark) Camille Rasmussen	(Finland) Maisa Kuusikko
Varna	Uneven Bars	(France) Aline Friess	(France) Célia Serber	(Romania) Ioana Stănciulescu
Varna	Balance Beam	(Croatia) Ana Đerek	(Finland) Maisa Kuusikko	(France) Aline Friess
Varna	Floor Exercise	(France) Aline Friess	(Hungary) Gréta Mayer	(Croatia) Ana Đerek
Osijek	Vault	(Bulgaria) Valentina Georgieva	(Slovenia) Teja Belak	(Slovenia) Tjaša Kysselef
Osijek	Uneven Bars	(Hungary) Zója Székely	(Germany) Sarah Voss	(Romania) Silviana Sfiringu
Osijek	Balance Beam	(Germany) Pauline Schäffer-Betz	(Croatia) Ana Đerek	(Romania) Ana Bărbosu
Osijek	Floor Exercise	(Romania) Ana Bărbosu	(Croatia) Ana Đerek	(Turkey) Göksu Üçtaş Şanlı
Koper	Vault	(Hungary) Zsófia Kóvacs	(Slovenia) Tjaša Kysselef	(Slovenia) Teja Belak
Koper	Uneven Bars	(Hungary) Zsófia Kóvacs	(Hungary) Zója Székely	(United Kingdom) Ruby Stacey
Koper	Balance Beam	(Hungary) Zsófia Kóvacs	(Croatia) Ana Đerek	(Hungary) Gréta Mayer
Koper	Floor Exercise	(Croatia) Ana Đerek	(United Kingdom) Poppy-Grace Stickler	(Hungary) Gréta Mayer
Paris	Vault	(United States) Jade Carey	(United States) Jordan Chiles	(France) Coline Devillard
Paris	Uneven Bars	(United States) Shilese Jones	(Brazil) Rebeca Andrade	(Belgium) Lisa Vaelen
Paris	Balance Beam	(France) Marine Boyer	(United States) Jade Carey	(Canada) Ellie Black
Paris	Floor Exercise	(United States) Jordan Chiles	(United States) Shilese Jones	(United Kingdom) Jennifer Gadirova
Szombathely	Vault	(United States) Addison Fatta	(Slovenia) Teja Belak	(Hungary) Gréta Mayer
Szombathely	Uneven Bars	(Hungary) Zója Székely	(Canada) Sydney Turner	(United States) Addison Fatta
Szombathely	Balance Beam	(Finland) Maisa Kuusikko	(Canada) Sydney Turner	(Hungary) Gréta Mayer
Szombathely	Floor Exercise	(United States) Katelyn Jong	(Hungary) Gréta Mayer	(Canada) Sydney Turner
Mersin	Vault	(Slovenia) Teja Belak	(Turkey) Bilge Tarhan	(Croatia) Tijana Korent
Mersin	Uneven Bars	(Romania) Ana Bărbosu	(Canada) Jessica Dowling	(Slovakia) Barbora Mokošová
Mersin	Balance Beam	(Romania) Ana Bărbosu	(Chinese Taipei) Lai Pin-ju	(Romania) Andreea Preda
Mersin	Floor Exercise	(Romania) Ana Bărbosu	(Romania) Andreea Preda	(Turkey) Sevgi Seda Kayışoğlu

== Controversy ==
On February 24, the first day of competition at the Cottbus World Cup, Russia launched a full-scale invasion of Ukraine. While no Russians competed in Cottbus, some competed at the following World Cup in Doha alongside Ukrainian athletes. During the medal ceremony for the parallel bars, Russian gymnast and bronze medalist Ivan Kuliak wore a Z on his chest – a military symbol and a sign of support for Russia's invasion of Ukraine – despite sharing a podium with gold medalist Illia Kovtun, a Ukrainian athlete, and Kazakh gymnast and silver medalist Milad Karimi, who lives and trains in Ukraine. The FIG announced that it would ask the Gymnastics Ethics Foundation to open disciplinary proceedings against Kuliak. The day before the incident, the FIG announced that starting March 7 Russian and Belarusian athletes would be banned from participating in FIG-sanctioned competitions.

The FIG sanctioned Kuliak with a one-year ban, ending May 17, 2023 or six months after the ban on Russian athletes is lifted and ruled that he is to be stripped of his bronze medal and prize money.

== See also ==
- 2022 FIG Rhythmic Gymnastics World Cup series
