= 2017 FIG Artistic Gymnastics World Cup series =

International gymnastics competition series

FIG Artistic Gymnastics World Cup series
- Location: various — see locations
- Date: February 22 – November 26, 2017 see schedule

The 2017 FIG Artistic Gymnastics World Cup series was a series of stages where events in men's and women's artistic gymnastics were contested.

== World Cup stages ==
| Date | Competition | Location | Type |
|---|---|---|---|
| 22–25 February | Melbourne World Cup | Melbourne, Australia | C III – Apparatus |
| 4 March | AT&T American Cup | Newark, United States | C II – All Around |
| 16–19 March | Baku World Cup AGF Trophy | Baku, Azerbaijan | C III – Apparatus |
| 18–19 March | DTB-Pokal World Cup | Stuttgart, Germany | C II – All Around |
| 22–25 March | Doha World Cup | Doha, Qatar | C III – Apparatus |
| 8 April | London World Cup | London, United Kingdom | C II – All Around |
| 12–14 May | Koper World Challenge Cup | Koper, Slovenia | C III – Apparatus |
| 18–21 May | Osijek World Challenge Cup | Osijek, Croatia | C III – Apparatus |
| 1–3 September | Varna World Challenge Cup | Varna, Bulgaria | C III – Apparatus |
| 8–10 September | Szombathely World Challenge Cup | Szombathely, Hungary | C III – Apparatus |
| 16–17 September | Internationaux de France or Paris World Challenge Cup | Paris, France | C III – Apparatus |
| 23–26 November | Turnier der Meister or Cottbus World Challenge Cup | Cottbus, Germany | C III – Apparatus |

== Men's medalists ==
| Competition | Event | Gold | Silver | Bronze |
| Melbourne World Cup | Floor Exercise | (Japan) Kenzō Shirai | (China) Mu Jile | (Turkey) Ferhat Arican |
| Melbourne World Cup | Pommel Horse | (Hungary) Krisztián Berki | (China) Zou Jingyuan | (China) Weng Hao |
| Melbourne World Cup | Still Rings | (China) Wu Guanhua (China) Zou Jingyuan | —N/a | (Turkey) İbrahim Çolak |
| Melbourne World Cup | Vault | (Japan) Kenzō Shirai | (Australia) Christopher Remkes | (Japan) Wataru Tanigawa |
| Melbourne World Cup | Parallel bars | (China) Zou Jingyuan | (Japan) Kenzō Shirai | (Turkey) Ferhat Arican |
| Melbourne World Cup | Horizontal Bar | (Japan) Kenzō Shirai | (Australia) Mitchell Morgans | (Japan) Yusuke Saito |
| AT&T American Cup | All-Around | (United States) Yul Moldauer | (Ukraine) Oleg Verniaiev | (United States) Akash Modi |
| Baku World Cup | Floor Exercise | (Lithuania) Tomas Kuzmickas | (Belarus) Pavel Bulauski | (Japan) Naoto Hayasaka |
| Baku World Cup | Pommel Horse | (China) Weng Hao | (Hungary) Krisztián Berki | (Croatia) Filip Ude |
| Baku World Cup | Still Rings | (Greece) Eleftherios Petrounias | (Japan) Kazuyuki Takeda | (Ukraine) Yevgen Yudenkov |
| Baku World Cup | Vault | (Australia) Christopher Remkes | (Belarus) Pavel Bulauski | (France) Zachari Hrimeche |
| Baku World Cup | Parallel bars | (China) Liu Rongbing | (China) He Youxiao | (Japan) Shogo Nonomura |
| Baku World Cup | Horizontal Bar | (Japan) Naoto Hayasaka | (Croatia) Anton Kovacevic | (Lithuania) Tomas Kuzmickas |
| Stuttgart World Cup | All-Around | (Ukraine) Oleg Verniaiev | (Japan) Kazuma Kaya | (China) Sun Wei |
| Doha World Cup | Floor Exercise | (Chinese Taipei) Tang Chia-hung | (Kazakhstan) Milad Karimi | (Romania) Marian Drăgulescu |
| Doha World Cup | Pommel Horse | (Hungary) Krisztián Berki | (China) Xiao Ruoteng | (Armenia) Artur Davtyan |
| Doha World Cup | Still Rings | (Armenia) Artur Tovmasyan | (Ukraine) Igor Radivilov | (China) Zou Jingyuan |
| Doha World Cup | Vault | (Vietnam) Le Thanh Tung | (Armenia) Artur Davtyan | (Finland) Heikki Saarenketo |
| Doha World Cup | Parallel bars | (China) Zou Jingyuan | (Germany) Marcel Nguyen | (Switzerland) Pablo Brägger |
| Doha World Cup | Horizontal Bar | (China) Xiao Ruoteng | (Croatia) Tin Srbić | (Switzerland) Christian Baumann |
| London World Cup | All-Around | (Ukraine) Oleg Verniaiev | (United States) Donnell Whittenburg | (Germany) Lukas Dauser |
| Koper World Challenge Cup | Floor Exercise | (United States) Eddie Penev | (United States) Donnell Whittenburg | (Netherlands) Bram Verhofstad |
| Koper World Challenge Cup | Pommel Horse | (Slovenia) Sašo Bertoncelj | (Hungary) Zoltán Kállai | (Hungary) Krisztián Berki |
| Koper World Challenge Cup | Still Rings | (Brazil) Arthur Zanetti | (Italy) Marco Lodadio | (Hong Kong) Ng Kiu Chung |
| Koper World Challenge Cup | Vault | (Israel) Andrey Medvedev | (United States) Donnell Whittenburg | (Netherlands) Casimir Schmidt |
| Koper World Challenge Cup | Parallel bars | (United States) Donnell Whittenburg | (Colombia) Jossimar Calvo | (Cyprus) Marios Georgiou |
| Koper World Challenge Cup | Horizontal Bar | (Croatia) Tin Srbić | (Netherlands) Bart Deurloo | (Hungary) David Vecsernyes |
| Osijek World Challenge Cup | Floor Exercise | (Russia) Kirill Prokopev | (Israel) Artem Dolgopyat | (Hungary) Krisztian Boncser |
| Osijek World Challenge Cup | Pommel Horse | (Republic of Ireland) Rhys McClenaghan | (Croatia) Robert Seligman | (Croatia) Matija Baron |
| Osijek World Challenge Cup | Still Rings | (Brazil) Arthur Zanetti | (Russia) Nikita Simonov | (Israel) Eyal Glazer |
| Osijek World Challenge Cup | Vault | (Dominican Republic) Audrys Nin Reyes | (Belarus) Ilya Yakauleu | (Israel) Andrey Medvedev |
| Osijek World Challenge Cup | Parallel bars | (Colombia) Jossimar Calvo | (Russia) Sergei Eltcov | (Venezuela) José Luis Fuentes |
| Osijek World Challenge Cup | Horizontal Bar | (Croatia) Tin Srbić | (Netherlands) Bart Deurloo | (Russia) Sergei Eltcov |
| Varna World Challenge Cup | Floor Exercise | (Chile) Tomás González | (Ukraine) Petro Pakhniuk | (Brazil) Arthur Mariano |
| Varna World Challenge Cup | Pommel Horse | (Belarus) Andrey Likhovitskiy | (France) Cyril Tommasone | (Croatia) Jakov Vlahek |
| Varna World Challenge Cup | Still Rings | (Ukraine) Igor Radivilov | (Austria) Vinzenz Hoeck | (Egypt) Ali Zahran |
| Varna World Challenge Cup | Vault | (Ukraine) Igor Radivilov | (Belarus) Pavel Bulauski | (Belarus) Ilya Yakauleu |
| Varna World Challenge Cup | Parallel bars | (Ukraine) Petro Pakhniuk | (Ukraine) Oleg Verniaiev | (Brazil) Caio Souza |
| Varna World Challenge Cup | Horizontal Bar | (Brazil) Caio Souza | (Colombia) Jossimar Calvo | (Croatia) Anton Kovacevic |
| Szombathely World Challenge Cup | Floor Exercise | (Japan) Fuya Maeno | (Romania) Marian Drăgulescu | (Turkey) Ahmet Önder |
| Szombathely World Challenge Cup | Pommel Horse | (Japan) Kazuma Kaya | (Japan) Fuya Maeno | (Croatia) Filip Ude |
| Szombathely World Challenge Cup | Still Rings | (Turkey) İbrahim Çolak | (Italy) Marco Lodadio | (Ukraine) Yevgen Yudenkov |
| Szombathely World Challenge Cup | Vault | (Romania) Marian Drăgulescu | (Guatemala) Jorge Vega | (Finland) Heikki Saarenketo |
| Szombathely World Challenge Cup | Parallel bars | (Japan) Kazuma Kaya | (Turkey) Ferhat Arican | (Turkey) Ahmet Onder |
| Szombathely World Challenge Cup | Horizontal Bar | (Colombia) Jossimar Calvo | (Japan) Fuya Maeno | (Cyprus) Marios Georgiou |
| French International or Paris World Challenge Cup | Floor Exercise | (Guatemala) Jorge Vega | (Ukraine) Petro Pakhniuk | (Romania) Marian Drăgulescu |
| French International or Paris World Challenge Cup | Pommel Horse | (Japan) Takaaki Sugino | (France) Cyril Tommasone | (Slovenia) Sašo Bertoncelj |
| French International or Paris World Challenge Cup | Still Rings | (Greece) Eleftherios Petrounias | (France) Samir Aït Saïd | (Ukraine) Oleg Verniaiev |
| French International or Paris World Challenge Cup | Vault | (Dominican Republic) Audrys Nin Reyes | (Ukraine) Igor Radivilov | (Ukraine) Oleg Verniaiev |
| French International or Paris World Challenge Cup | Parallel bars | (Ukraine) Oleg Verniaiev | (Ukraine) Petro Pakhniuk | (France) Axel Augis |
| French International or Paris World Challenge Cup | Horizontal Bar | (Netherlands) Epke Zonderland | (Netherlands) Bart Deurloo | (Japan) Yusuke Tanaka |
| Cottbus Cup | Floor Exercise | (Slovenia) Rok Klavora | (Netherlands) Bram Verhofstad | (Russia) Kirill Prokopev |
| Cottbus Cup | Pommel Horse | (China) Wang Juwen | (Japan) Ryuhei Nashimoto | (China) Tan Di |
| Cottbus Cup | Still Rings | (Ukraine) Igor Radivilov | (China) Lei Peng | (China) Lan Xingyu |
| Cottbus Cup | Vault | (Japan) Keisuke Asato | (Ukraine) Igor Radivilov | (Australia) Christopher Remkes |
| Cottbus Cup | Parallel bars | (China) Tan Di | (Ukraine) Oleg Verniaiev | (Germany) Marcel Nguyen |
| Cottbus Cup | Horizontal Bar | (Germany) Andreas Bretschneider | (United States) Marvin Kimble | (Norway) Pietro Giachino |

== Women's medalists ==
| Competition | Event | Gold | Silver | Bronze |
| Melbourne World Cup | Vault | (China) Wang Yan | (Australia) Emily Little | (Australia) Naomi Lee |
| Melbourne World Cup | Uneven Bars | (China) Liu Tingting | (China) Luo Huan | (Australia) Rianna Mizzen |
| Melbourne World Cup | Balance Beam | (China) Liu Tingting | (Netherlands) Sanne Wevers | (Australia) Emily Little |
| Melbourne World Cup | Floor Exercise | (Australia) Emily Little | (Australia) Georgia Godwin | (China) Liu Tingting |
| AT&T American Cup | All-Around | (United States) Ragan Smith | (Japan) Asuka Teramoto | (France) Mélanie de Jesus dos Santos |
| Baku World Cup | Vault | (Uzbekistan) Oksana Chusovitina | (Australia) Emily Little | (Slovenia) Teja Belak |
| Baku World Cup | Uneven Bars | (Ukraine) Diana Varinska | (Australia) Rianna Mizzen | (Australia) Georgia-Rose Brown |
| Baku World Cup | Balance Beam | (Romania) Cătălina Ponor | (Greece) Vasiliki Millousi | (Australia) Emily Little |
| Baku World Cup | Floor Exercise | (Romania) Cătălina Ponor | (Australia) Emily Little | (Azerbaijan) Marina Nekrasova |
| Stuttgart World Cup | All-Around | (Germany) Tabea Alt | (Russia) Angelina Melnikova | (United States) Morgan Hurd |
| Doha World Cup | Vault | (Uzbekistan) Oksana Chusovitina | (Australia) Emily Little | (Slovenia) Teja Belak |
| Doha World Cup | Uneven Bars | (China) Luo Huan | (Hungary) Zsófia Kovács | (Australia) Georgia-Rose Brown |
| Doha World Cup | Balance Beam | (China) Liu Tingting | (Romania) Cătălina Ponor | (China) Luo Huan |
| Doha World Cup | Floor Exercise | (China) Liu Tingting | (Australia) Emily Little | (Croatia) Ana Derek |
| London World Cup | All-Around | (Germany) Tabea Alt | (United States) Victoria Nguyen | (United Kingdom) Amy Tinkler |
| Koper World Challenge Cup | Vault | (Brazil) Rebeca Andrade | (Hungary) Boglarka Devai | (Slovenia) Teja Belak |
| Koper World Challenge Cup | Uneven Bars | (Romania) Larisa Iordache | (Canada) Ellie Black | (Brazil) Flavia Saraiva |
| Koper World Challenge Cup | Balance Beam | (Romania) Larisa Iordache | (Canada) Ellie Black | (Brazil) Thais Fidelis |
| Koper World Challenge Cup | Floor Exercise | (Germany) Carina Kröll | (Canada) Ellie Black | (Slovakia) Barbora Mokosova |
| Osijek World Challenge Cup | Vault | (Hungary) Boglarka Devai | (Hungary) Zsófia Kovács | (Slovenia) Tjaša Kysselef |
| Osijek World Challenge Cup | Uneven Bars | (Russia) Anastasiia Iliankova | (Hungary) Zsófia Kovács | (Poland) Gabriela Janik |
| Osijek World Challenge Cup | Balance Beam | (Brazil) Thais Fidelis | (Russia) Anastasiia Iliankova | (Brazil) Flavia Saraiva |
| Osijek World Challenge Cup | Floor Exercise | (Brazil) Thais Fidelis | (Brazil) Flavia Saraiva | (Russia) Lilia Akhaimova |
| Varna World Challenge Cup | Vault | (Brazil) Rebeca Andrade | (Canada) Shallon Olsen | (Slovenia) Teja Belak |
| Varna World Challenge Cup | Uneven Bars | (Brazil) Rebeca Andrade | (Egypt) Farah Hussein | (Brazil) Thais Fidelis |
| Varna World Challenge Cup | Balance Beam | (Brazil) Daniele Hypólito | (United Kingdom) Georgia-Mae Fenton | (Bulgaria) Pamela Georgieva |
| Varna World Challenge Cup | Floor Exercise | (Brazil) Thais Fidelis | (Canada) Shallon Olsen | (Egypt) Farah Hussein |
| Szombathely World Challenge Cup | Vault | (Azerbaijan) Marina Nekrasova | (Hungary) Boglárka Dévai | (Canada) Brooklyn Moors |
| Szombathely World Challenge Cup | Uneven Bars | (Sweden) Jonna Adlerteg | (Hungary) Zsófia Kovács | (Canada) Rose-Kaying Woo |
| Szombathely World Challenge Cup | Balance Beam | (Romania) Cătălina Ponor | (Hungary) Zsófia Kovács | (Ukraine) Valeria Iarmolenko |
| Szombathely World Challenge Cup | Floor Exercise | (Canada) Brooklyn Moors | (Romania) Cătălina Ponor | (United Kingdom) Amy Tinkler |
| French International or Paris World Challenge Cup | Vault | (France) Coline Devillard | (Hungary) Boglárka Dévai | (Germany) Michelle Timm |
| French International or Paris World Challenge Cup | Uneven Bars | (Belgium) Nina Derwael | (France) Mélanie de Jesus dos Santos | (Ukraine) Diana Varinska |
| French International or Paris World Challenge Cup | Balance Beam | (Romania) Larisa Iordache | (France) Marine Boyer | (United Kingdom) Claudia Fragapane |
| French International or Paris World Challenge Cup | Floor Exercise | (United Kingdom) Claudia Fragapane | (Romania) Larisa Iordache | (Ukraine) Diana Varinska |
| Cottbus Cup | Vault | (Uzbekistan) Oksana Chusovitina | (Russia) Lilia Akhaimova | (Slovenia) Tjaša Kysselef |
| Cottbus Cup | Uneven Bars | (Germany) Elisabeth Seitz | (China) Lyu Jiaqi | (China) Wang Cenyu |
| Cottbus Cup | Balance Beam | (China) Wang Cenyu | (Germany) Pauline Schäfer | (Russia) Maria Kharenkova |
| Cottbus Cup | Floor Exercise | (Russia) Lilia Akhaimova | (Russia) Maria Kharenkova | (Germany) Pauline Schäfer |

== See also ==
- 2017 FIG Rhythmic Gymnastics World Cup series
