= Adem Asil =

Turkish artistic gymnast

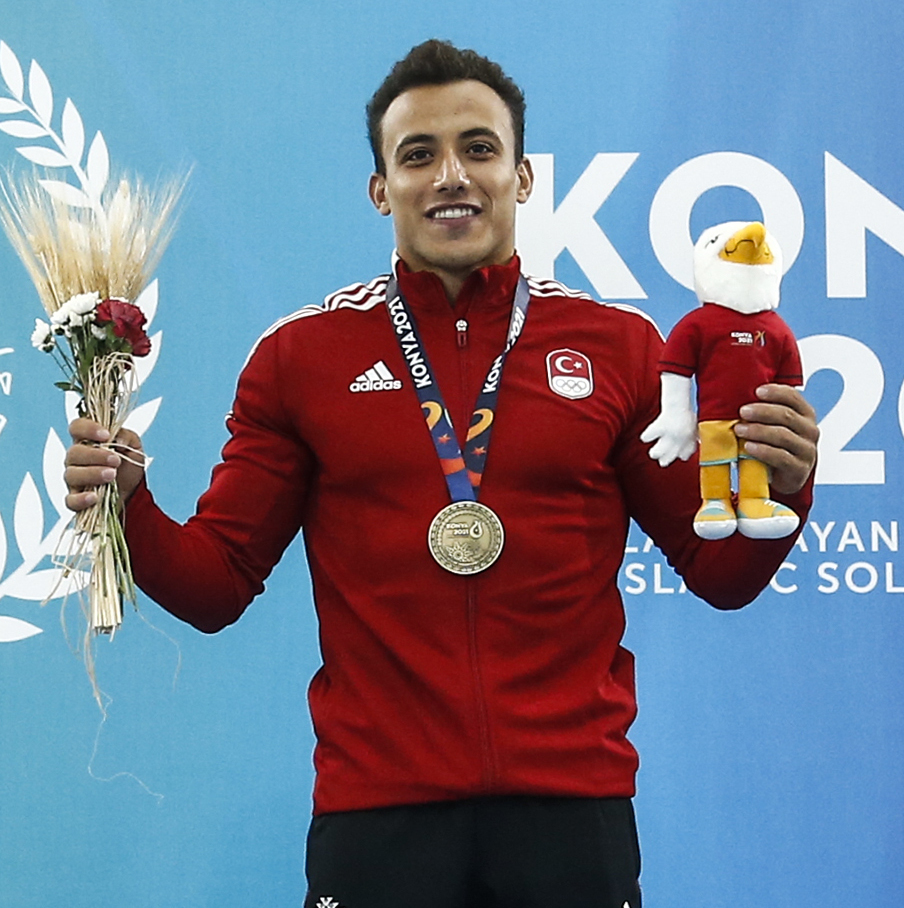
- Asil at the 2021 Islamic Solidarity Games

Personal information
- Alternative names: Abdelrahman Elgamal; Abdelrahman Elzamzamy; Abdelrahman El Zamzamy
- Nickname: Abdel
- Born: 21 February 1999 (age 27) Alexandria, Egypt

Gymnastics career
- Discipline: Men's artistic gymnastics
- Country represented: Turkey; (2020–present)
- Former countries represented: Egypt (2007–2017)
Medal record
Men's artistic gymnastics
Representing Turkey
World Championships
Gold medal – first place	2022 Liverpool	Rings
Silver medal – second place	2025 Jakarta	Rings
European Championships
Gold medal – first place	2023 Antalya	All-Around
Gold medal – first place	2023 Antalya	Rings
Gold medal – first place	2025 Leipzig	All-Around
Gold medal – first place	2025 Leipzig	Rings
Silver medal – second place	2020 Mersin	Team
Silver medal – second place	2022 Munich	Rings
Silver medal – second place	2023 Antalya	Team
Bronze medal – third place	2021 Basel	Horizontal Bar
Bronze medal – third place	2022 Munich	Team
Bronze medal – third place	2022 Munich	All-Around
Bronze medal – third place	2024 Rimini	Rings
Mediterranean Games
Gold medal – first place	2022 Oran	Team
Gold medal – first place	2022 Oran	All-Around
Gold medal – first place	2022 Oran	Vault
Silver medal – second place	2022 Oran	Rings
Silver medal – second place	2022 Oran	Horizontal Bar
Bronze medal – third place	2022 Oran	Floor Exercise
Islamic Solidarity Games
Gold medal – first place	2021 Konya	Team
Gold medal – first place	2021 Konya	All-Around
Gold medal – first place	2021 Konya	Rings
Silver medal – second place	2021 Konya	Vault
Bronze medal – third place	2021 Konya	Floor Exercise
World University Games
Bronze medal – third place	2021 Chengdu	Rings

Adem Asil (born 21 February 1999) is an Egyptian-born Turkish male artistic gymnast. He represented Turkey at the 2020 and 2024 Olympic Games. He is the 2022 World Champion on still rings and is the 2023 and 2025 European all-around champion.

Born Abdelrahman Elzamzamy, he changed his name to Abdelrahman Elgamal when he moved to Turkey and competed under that name at a 2020 European Championship. In 2021, he changed it again to Adem Asil, as a response to the condition of changing a foreign name into Turkish, to obtain naturalization.

== Early life ==
Abdelrahman Elzamzamy was born in Alexandria, Egypt on 21 February 1999 to a middle-class Egyptian family.

== Gymnastics career ==
=== Representing Egypt ===
==== 2017 ====
A member of the Egyptian national team, Elzamzamy took part in the Paris Challenge Cup in France and the Varna Challenge Cup in Bulgaria. He later competed at the World Championships in Montreal, where he finished 37th in the all-around during qualification and did not advance to any event finals.

=== Representing Turkey ===
==== 2018–2020 ====
Shortly after the 2017 World Championships, Elzamzamy's coach announced that he was moving to Turkey and invited Elzamzamy to showcase himself in front of the Turkish national coaches. They were impressed with "his work ethic, his evident strength, and his unshakable belief in himself" and invited him to train with the Turkish national team. Elzamzamy moved to Turkey, leaving his parents in Egypt while continuing to train in gymnastics in Turkey. After becoming a naturalized citizen in 2019, the International Gymnastics Federation approved his request for nationality change; however, it wouldn't take effect until 2020.

Elgamal competed for Turkey for the first time at the 2020 Baku World Cup. He later was chosen to represent Turkey at the 2020 European Championships in Mersin. He helped Turkey win silver in the team event. Additionally he finished fourth on rings and horizontal bar.

==== 2021 ====
Elgamal began competing under the name Adem Asil in 2021. At the European Championships, Asil finished fifth in the all-around during qualifications and therefore earned an individual Olympic berth to compete at the postponed 2020 Olympic Games. He suffered an injury during the all-around final and did not finish. However, he competed during the horizontal bar final and won the bronze medal behind David Belyavskiy and Andy Toba. Asil next competed at the Osijek Challenge Cup and the Doha World Cup, picking up three medals at the former. At the Olympic Games, Asil qualified for the all-around, rings, and vault finals. He finished fifteenth in the all-around, seventh on rings, and sixth on vault. Asil finished the year competing at the World Championships, where he finished eleventh in the all-around.

==== 2022 ====
Asil started the year competing at the World Cups in Cottbus, Baku, and Osijek. He competed at the Mediterranean Games, where he helped Turkey win gold in the team event. Individually, Asil won gold in the all-around and on vault, silver on rings and horizontal bar behind İbrahim Çolak and Marios Georgiou respectively, and bronze on floor exercise.

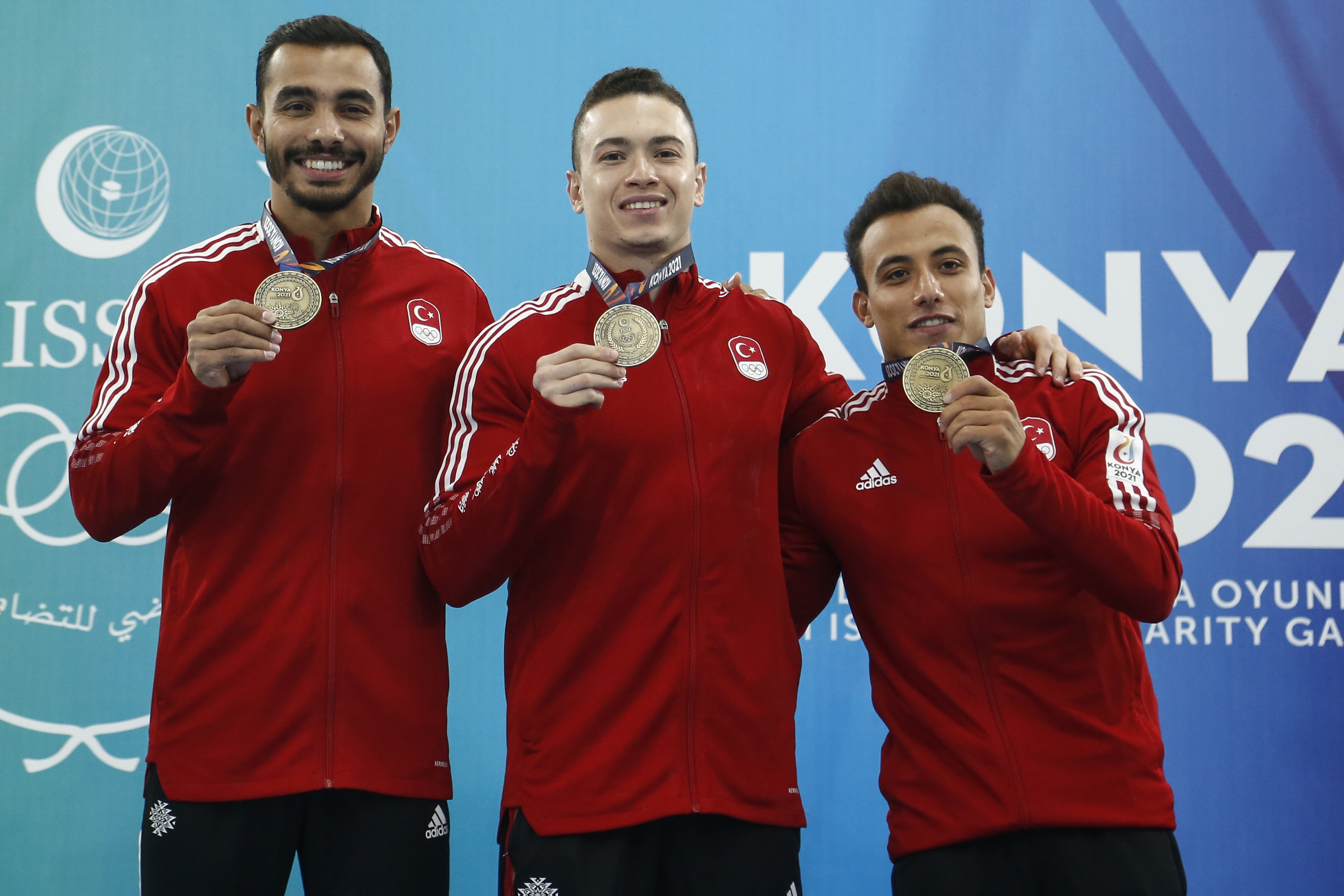
Asil (right) at the Islamic Solidarity Games

Asil next competed at the Islamic Solidarity Games where he helped Turkey once again win gold in the team event. Individually, he won gold in the all-around and on rings, silver on vault, and bronze on floor exercise. In August, Asil competed at the 2022 European Championships. On the first day of competition, Asil won bronze in the all-around behind Joe Fraser and compatriot Ahmet Önder. He helped Turkey win bronze in the team event, and individually he won silver on rings behind Eleftherios Petrounias.

In September, Asil competed at the Paris World Challenge Cup. He won gold on both vault and rings.

At the World Championships, Asil helped Turkey finish eleventh during qualifications – their highest placement in history. Individually Asil won gold on rings, earning Turkey's second gold medal on the event after İbrahim Çolak in 2019.

==== 2023 ====
Asil competed at the 2023 European Championships where he helped Turkey finish second as a team. Individually, he won gold in the all-around, becoming the first Turkish gymnast to achieve the feat. During apparatus finals, he won gold on rings and placed fifth on vault. Asil next competed at the World University Games, where he helped the Turkish team finish ninth. Individually, he won bronze on rings behind Lan Xingyu and Zou Jingyuan and placed fifth on vault.

At the 2023 World Championships, Asil helped Turkey finish tenth as a team during qualifications. Although they did not qualify for the team final, they qualified a full team to the 2024 Olympic Games for the first time.

==== 2024 ====
Asil competed at the 2024 European Championships where he won bronze on rings behind Eleftherios Petrounias and Nikita Simonov. He was named to the team to compete at the 2024 Olympic Games alongside Ferhat Arıcan, İbrahim Çolak, Emre Dodanlı, and Ahmet Önder; they finished ninth during qualifications. Individually, Asil qualified for the rings final, where he finished fifth.

==== 2025 ====
Asil competed at the Osijek World Cup and the Varna World Challenge Cup, where he won gold on rings at both and won silver on horizontal bar at the latter. At the 2025 European Championships Asil qualified to the all-around, rings, and horizontal bar finals. Additionally, he qualified for the inaugural mixed team event alongside compatriot Nazlı Savranbaşı; they finished 16th overall. The following day Asil won his second European all-around title, finishing ahead of Léo Saladino and Krisztofer Mészáros. During event finals Asil won gold on rings, tied with Eleftherios Petrounias, and finished fifth on horizontal bar.

At the 2025 World Championships, Asil only competed on rings. He won the silver medal behind Donnell Whittenburg of the United States.

== Competitive history ==
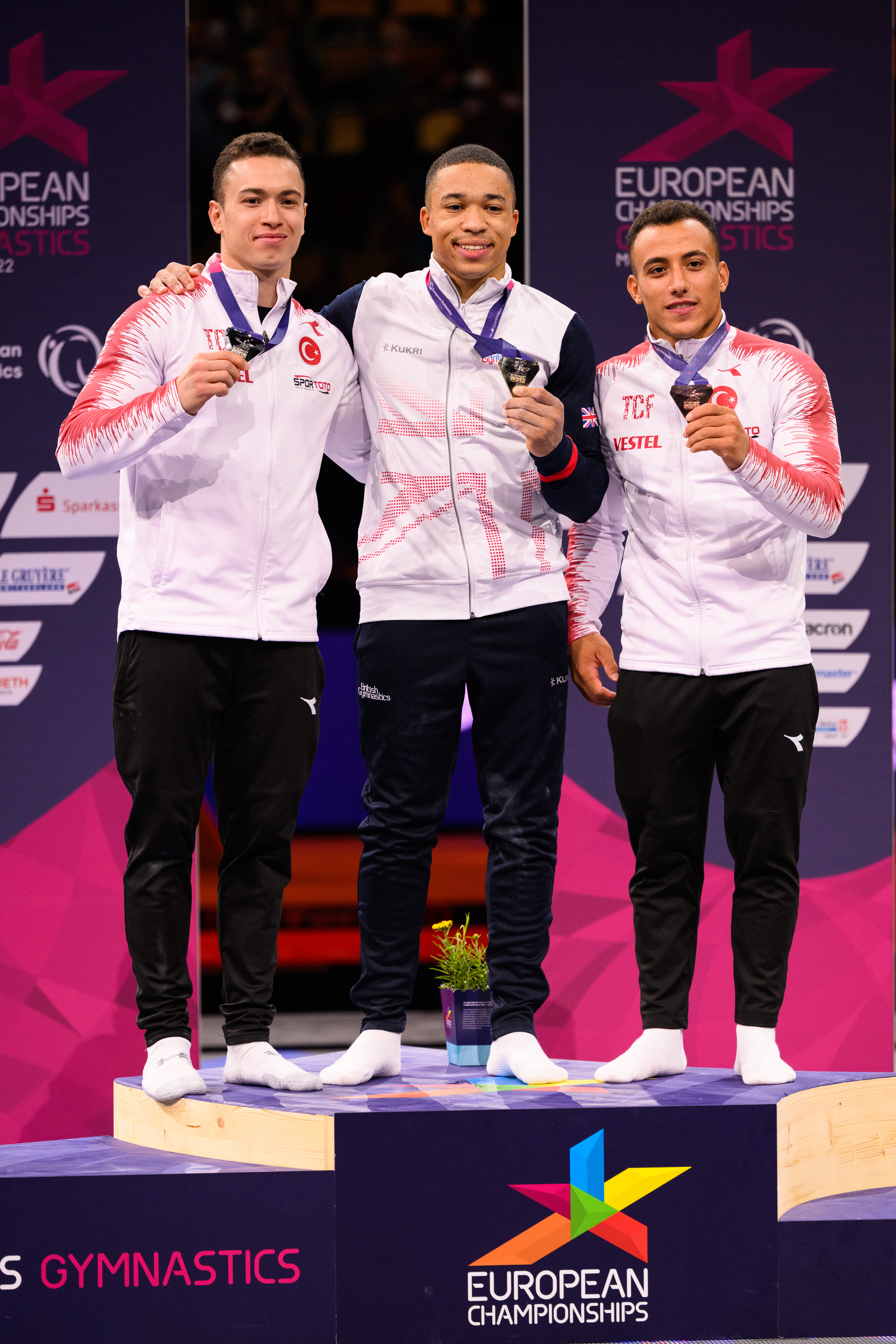
Asil (right) at the 2022 European Championships

Competitive history of Abdelrahman Elzamzamy representing Egypt
Year	Event	Team	AA	FX	PH	SR	VT	PB	HB
2017	Varna World Challenge Cup					7	5		
2017	World Championships		37						

Competitive history of Adem Asil representing Turkey
Year	Event	Team	AA	FX	PH	SR	VT	PB	HB
2019	Turkish Championships		2nd place, silver medalist(s)	5	4	3rd place, bronze medalist(s)			5
2020	Turkish Championships		1st place, gold medalist(s)		3rd place, bronze medalist(s)		2nd place, silver medalist(s)	3rd place, bronze medalist(s)	
2020	Baku World Cup			1st place, gold medalist(s)			7		
2020	European Championships	2nd place, silver medalist(s)				4			4
2021	Turkish Championships		1st place, gold medalist(s)	3rd place, bronze medalist(s)	4	2nd place, silver medalist(s)	1st place, gold medalist(s)	4	2nd place, silver medalist(s)
2021	European Championships		DNF	6					3rd place, bronze medalist(s)
2021	Osijek World Challenge Cup			6		3rd place, bronze medalist(s)	2nd place, silver medalist(s)		3rd place, bronze medalist(s)
2021	Doha World Cup			4			4		
2021	Olympic Games		15			7	6		
2021	Turkish Team Championships	1st place, gold medalist(s)					1st place, gold medalist(s)		
2021	World Championships		11						
2022	Cottbus World Cup					4	3rd place, bronze medalist(s)		
2022	Baku World Cup			8		6			
2022	Osijek World Challenge Cup			2nd place, silver medalist(s)		1st place, gold medalist(s)	3rd place, bronze medalist(s)		5
2022	Mediterranean Games	1st place, gold medalist(s)	1st place, gold medalist(s)	3rd place, bronze medalist(s)		2nd place, silver medalist(s)	1st place, gold medalist(s)		2nd place, silver medalist(s)
2022	Islamic Solidarity Games	1st place, gold medalist(s)	1st place, gold medalist(s)	3rd place, bronze medalist(s)		1st place, gold medalist(s)	2nd place, silver medalist(s)		7
2022	European Championships	3rd place, bronze medalist(s)	3rd place, bronze medalist(s)	6		2nd place, silver medalist(s)			
2022	Paris World Challenge Cup					1st place, gold medalist(s)	1st place, gold medalist(s)		
2022	Mersin World Challenge Cup			2nd place, silver medalist(s)		1st place, gold medalist(s)	8		2nd place, silver medalist(s)
2022	World Championships	11	WD			1st place, gold medalist(s)	R1		
2022	Arthur Gander Memorial		5						
2022	Swiss Cup	3rd place, bronze medalist(s)							
2023	Cottbus World Cup					5			
2023	Doha World Cup			4		2nd place, silver medalist(s)		8	4
2023	DTB Pokal Team Challenge	3rd place, bronze medalist(s)				1st place, gold medalist(s)	3rd place, bronze medalist(s)		
2023	European Championships	2nd place, silver medalist(s)	1st place, gold medalist(s)			1st place, gold medalist(s)	5		
2023	World University Games	9	WD			3rd place, bronze medalist(s)	5		
2023	World Championships	10	WD						
2023	Arthur Gander Memorial		7						
2023	Swiss Cup	6							
2024	Antalya World Challenge Cup			1st place, gold medalist(s)		2nd place, silver medalist(s)			
2024	European Championships		9			3rd place, bronze medalist(s)			
2024	Olympic Games	9				5			
2025	Osijek World Cup					1st place, gold medalist(s)			
2025	Varna World Challenge Cup			6		1st place, gold medalist(s)			2nd place, silver medalist(s)
2025	European Championships		1st place, gold medalist(s)			1st place, gold medalist(s)			5
2025	World Championships	—N/a				2nd place, silver medalist(s)			
2026	Antalya World Cup					1st place, gold medalist(s)			

== See also ==
- Nationality changes in gymnastics
