= Mert Efe Kılıçer =

Turkish artistic gymnast (born 2004)

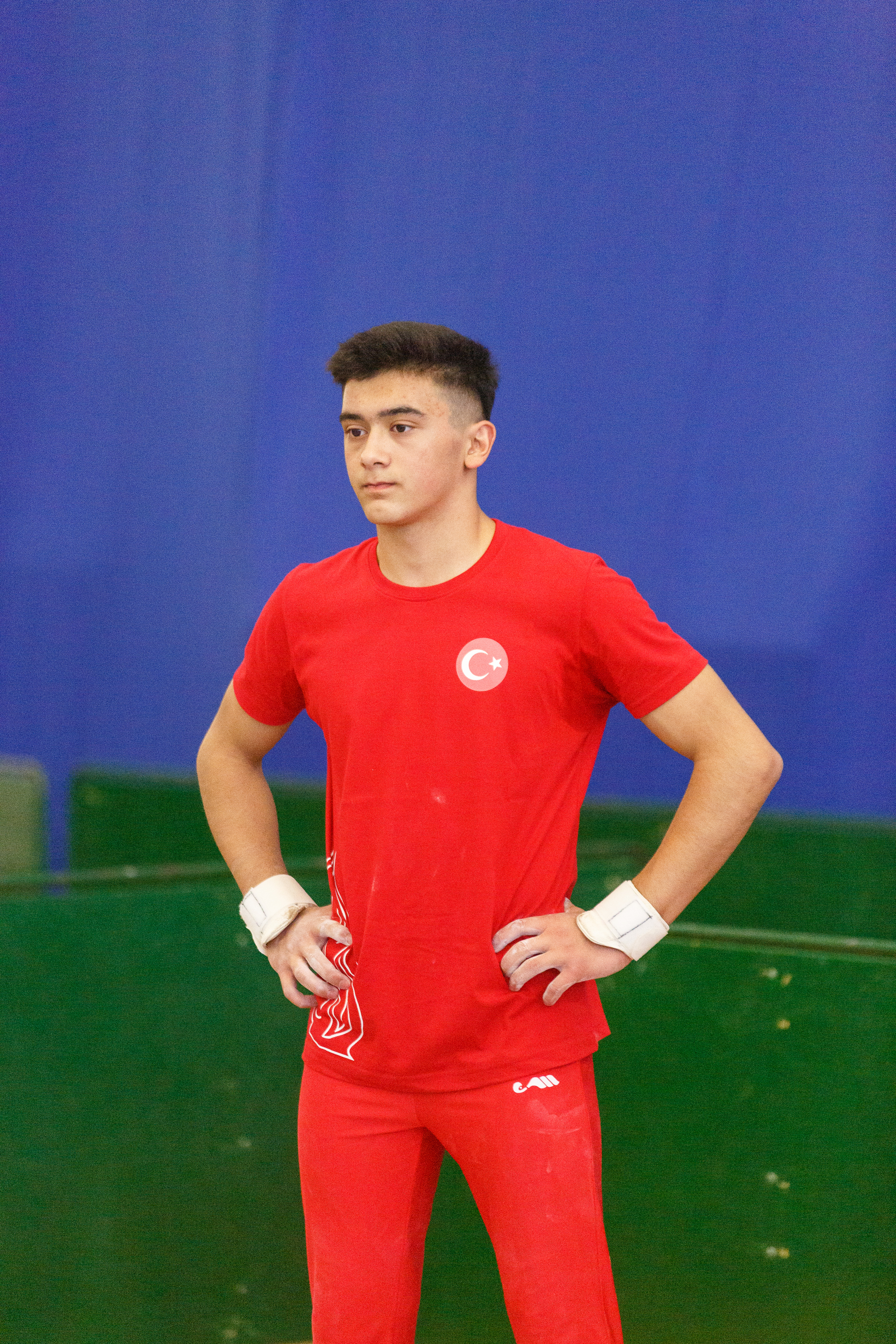
- Mert Efe Kılıçer at the 5th International Junior Budapest Cup in 2019.

Personal information
- Born: 17 November 2004 (age 21) Yenimahalle, Ankara, Turkey

Gymnastics career
- Discipline: Men's artistic gymnastics
- Country represented: Turkey
- Club: Göztepe Olimpik SK
- Head coach: Yılmaz Göktekin (national)
Medal record
Men's artistic gymnastics
Representing Turkey
Mediterranean Games
Gold medal – first place	2026 Taranto	Team
Junior European Championships
Silver medal – second place	2020 Mersin	Horizontal bar
Bronze medal – third place	2020 Mersin	Parallel bars

Mert Efe Kılıçer (born 17 November 2004) is a Turkish artistic gymnast. He is a member of the national team.

== Personal life ==
Mert Efe Kılıçer was born in Yenimahalle, Ankara, Turkey on 17 November 2004.

He completed his secondary education at Private Final Akademi Anatolian High School in Bolu.

== Early years ==
Encouraged by his family, Kılıçer started with gymnastics in Ankara at the age of six. In 2013, he moved to Kayseri upon the suggestion of his cousin, who was performing the same sport there. He continued his training with his coach Mehmet Bilgin, and showed development in a short time. He won his first title in a championship for primary school students. He became a national athlete in the youth age groups. He achieved various important results in three international championships he participated in.

He won the silver medal in the horizontal bar and the bronze medal in the parallel bars event of the junior category at the 2020 European Men's Artistic Gymnastics Championships in Mersin, Turkey.

In 2021, he captured the gold medal in the parallel bars event of the junior category at the Ukraine International Cup in Kyiv.

In March 2024, Kılıçer transferred from Rüya Cimnastik SK to Göztepe Olimpik SK. In the national team, he is coached by Yılmaz Göktekşn.

== Career ==
Kılıçer won the bronze medal in the All-around event and the silver medal in the team event with his teammates Ahmet Burak Ekici, Altan Doğan, Liu Tuakli and Volkan Arda Hamarat at the 2022 Gymnasiade in Normandy, France.

Hr took the bronze medal in the horizontal bar event at the first leg of the 2024 FIG Artistic Gymnastics World Challenge Cup series in Antalya, Turkey.

He won the bronze medal in the horizontal bar event at the first leg of the 2025 FIG Artistic Gymnastics World Cup series in Cottbus, Germany.

He won the gold medal in the horizontal bar event at the first leg of the 2025 FIG Artistic Gymnastics World Challenge Cup series in Tashkent, Uzbekistan.
