= Liu Tuakli =

Turkish artistic gymnast (born 2004)

- Born: 1 July 2004 (age 22) İzmir, Turkey

Gymnastics career
- Discipline: Men's artistic gymnastics
- Country represented: Turkey
- Club: Şavkar CSK
Medal record
Men's artistic gymnastics
Representing Turkey
Gymnasiade
Silver medal – second place	2022 Normandy	Team

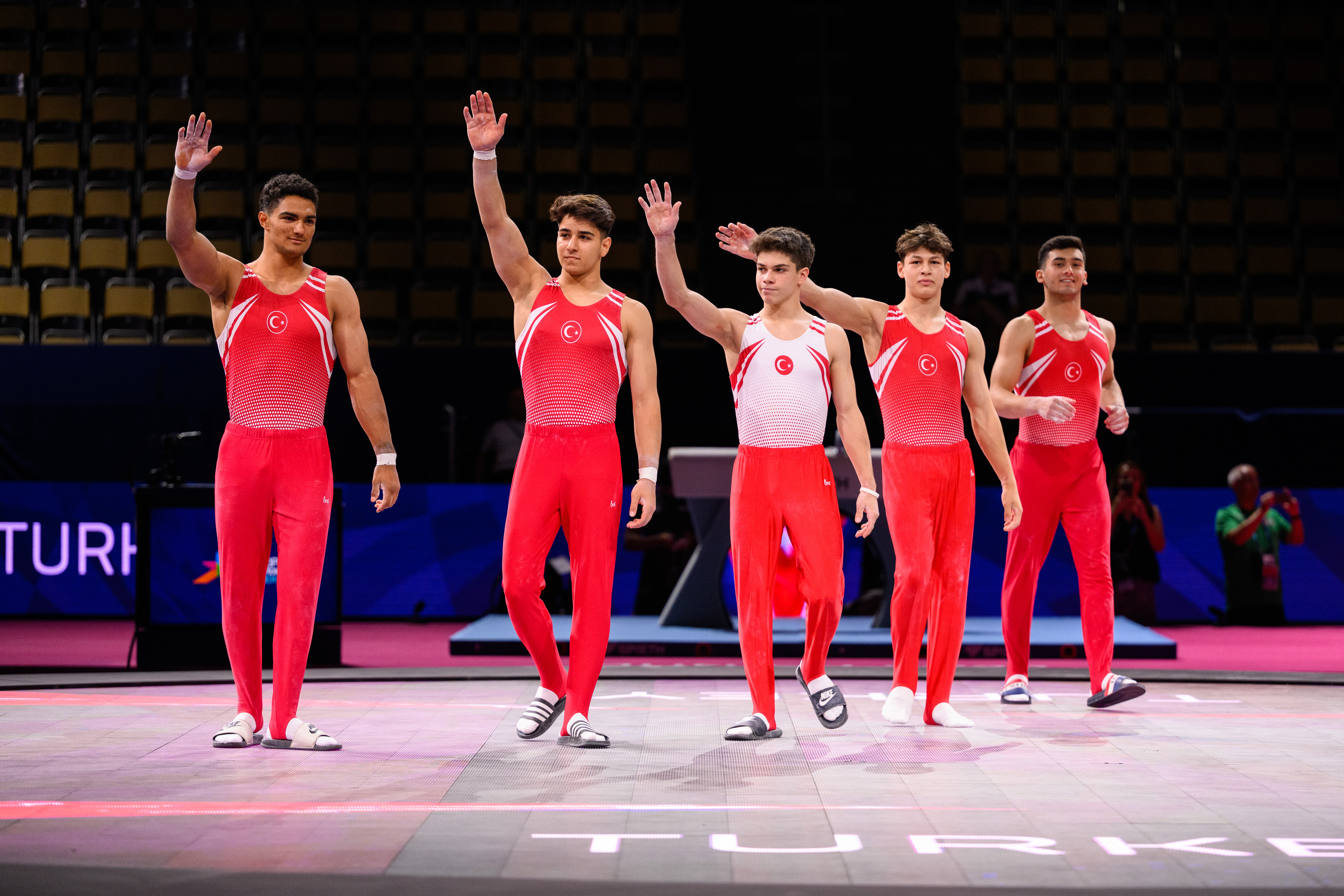
Liu Tuakli (far right) at the 2022 European Artistic Gymnastics Championships.

Liu Carlo Mandela Tuakli (born 1 July 2004) is a Turkish artistic gymnast. He is a member of the national team.

== Personal life ==
Liu Tuakli was born in İzmir, Turkey on 1 July 2004.

He completed his secondary education at Private Gaziemir Kocatürk Anatolian High School.

== Sport career ==
Tuakli is a member of Şavkar CSK in İzmir.

Tuakli won the silver medal in the team event with his teammates Mert Efe Kılıçer, Ahmet Burak Ekici, Altan Doğan and Volkan Arda Hamarat at the 2022 Gymnasiade in Normandy, France. =
