= İbrahim Çolak (gymnast) =

Turkish artistic gymnast (born 1995)

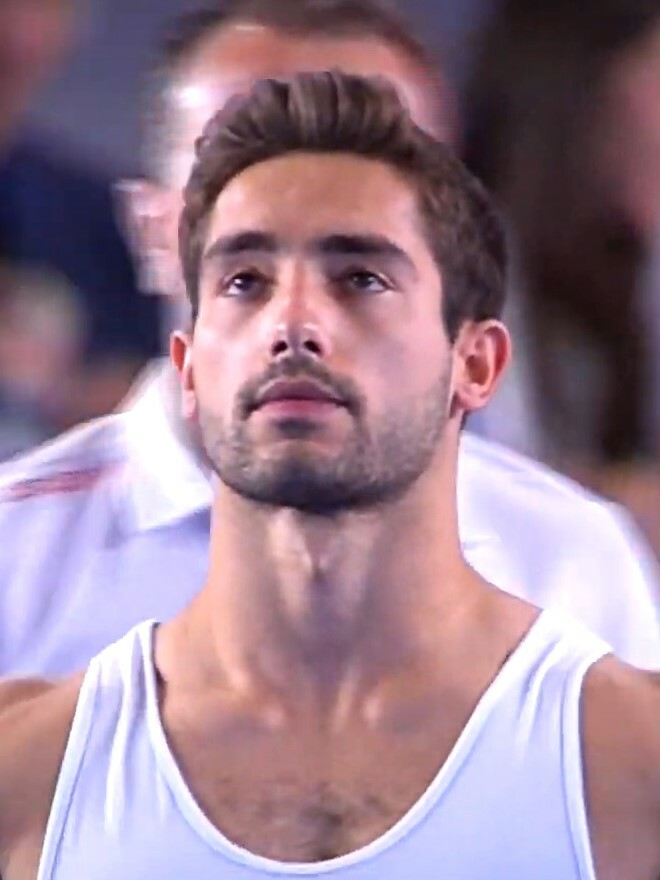
- Çolak at the 2019 Summer Universiade

Personal information
- Born: 7 January 1995 (age 31) Konak, İzmir, Turkey
- Height: 165 cm (5 ft 5 in)

Gymnastics career
- Discipline: Men's artistic gymnastics
- Country represented: Turkey (2012–present)
- Club: Savkar Cimnastik Spor Kulubu
- Head coach: Yilmaz Goktekin
Medal record
Representing Turkey
Men's artistic Gymnastics
World Championships
Gold medal – first place	2019 Stuttgart	Rings
European Championships
Gold medal – first place	2020 Mersin	Rings
Silver medal – second place	2018 Glasgow	Rings
Silver medal – second place	2020 Mersin	Team
European Games
Bronze medal – third place	2015 Baku	Rings
Summer Universiade
Silver medal – second place	2017 Taipei	Rings
Mediterranean Games
Gold medal – first place	2018 Tarragona	Rings
Gold medal – first place	2022 Oran	Team
Gold medal – first place	2022 Oran	Rings
Gold medal – first place	2026 Taranto	Team
Silver medal – second place	2013 Mersin	Rings
Silver medal – second place	2018 Tarragona	Team
Islamic Solidarity Games
Gold medal – first place	2017 Baku	Team
Gold medal – first place	2017 Baku	Rings
FIG World Cup
Event	1st	2nd	3rd
Apparatus World Cup	2	3	2
World Challenge Cup	6	5	2
Total	8	8	4

İbrahim Çolak (born 7 January 1995) is a Turkish artistic gymnast who is primarily a rings specialist. He is the 2019 World champion on the rings and the first Turkish gymnast to medal at the World Artistic Gymnastics Championships. He also became Turkey's first European champion in artistic gymnastics when he won gold on the rings at the 2020 European Championships. He is also the 2018 European silver medalist on the rings and the 2020 European silver medalist with the Turkish team. He is the 2022 Mediterranean Games champion on the rings and in the team event. He won the bronze medal at the 2015 European Games and the silver medal at the 2013 Mediterranean Games on the rings. He represented Turkey at the 2020 Summer Olympics where he finished fifth in the rings final.

== Career ==
Çolak began gymnastics when he was five years old.

=== Junior ===
At the 2011 European Youth Summer Olympic Festival in Trabzon, Çolak won the bronze medal on the rings. He also competed at the 2012 Junior European Championships where he won the silver medal on the parallel bars and finished fourth in the rings final.

=== Senior ===
At the 2013 Mediterranean Games in Mersin, Çolak won the silver medal on the rings, Turkey's first medal on rings at the Mediterranean Games. He then competed at the 2013 World Championships in Antwerp. In the qualification round, he finished fifteenth on the rings and thirty-sixth on the parallel bars.

Çolak won the bronze medal on rings behind Matteo Morandi and Ri Se-gwang at the 2014 Osijek World Challenge Cup. He then won the gold medal on the parallel bars at the 2014 Hungarian Grand Prix. At the 2014 World Championships, he finished tenth on the rings in the qualification round, making him the second reserve for the final.

Çolak won the bronze medal on the rings behind Arthur Zanetti and Eleftherios Petrounias at the 2015 Cottbus World Challenge Cup. He then won the silver medal on rings at the Varna World Challenge Cup behind Danny Pinheiro Rodrigues. He won the bronze medal in the rings event at the 2015 European Games in Baku, Azerbaijan, behind Eleftherios Petrounias and Nikita Ignatyev. He then represented Turkey at the 2015 Summer Universiade alongside Ahmet Önder and Ferhat Arıcan, and they finished eleventh in the team competition. He qualified for the rings final where he finished fourth, only 0.033 behind the bronze medalist Oleg Verniaiev.

Çolak won the gold medal on rings at the 2016 Baku World Challenge Cup. He won another gold medal on rings at the Ljubljana World Challenge Cup, and he also won the bronze medal on the parallel bars. Then at the Osijek World Challenge Cup, he won the silver medal on the rings behind Russia's Denis Ablyazin. He finished seventh in the rings final at the 2016 European Championships. He then won the gold medal on the rings at the 2016 Mersin World Challenge Cup.

Çolak won the bronze medal on the rings at the 2017 Melbourne World Cup. Then at the 2017 European Championships, he finished fifth in the rings final. He represented Turkey at the 2017 Islamic Solidarity Games and won the team gold medal alongside Ferhat Arıcan and Ahmet Önder. Individually, he won the gold medal in the rings final. He then represented Turkey at the 2017 Summer Universiade where the Turkish team finished tenth. In the rings final, he won the silver medal behind Armenia's Artur Davtyan. He won the gold medal on the rings at the Szombathely World Challenge Cup. At the 2017 World Championships in Montreal, he finished fifth in the rings final with a score of 15.066.

Çolak won the silver medal on the rings at the 2018 Baku World Cup behind Eleftherios Petrounias. He also won the silver medal on rings at the Doha World Cup, this time behind Igor Radivilov. He also won silver medals on rings at the Osijek and the Koper World Challenge Cups behind Denis Ablyazin and Kazuyuki Takeda respectively. He captured the gold medal on the rings at the 2018 Mediterranean Games in Tarragona, Spain. He then won the gold medal on the rings at the Mersin World Challenge Cup. He won the silver medal in the rings at the 2018 European Championships in Glasgow, Scotland, and was Turkey's first silver medalist at the European Artistic Gymnastics Championships. Then at the 2018 World Championships in Doha, he finished ninth on the rings in the qualification round, making him the first reserve for the final.

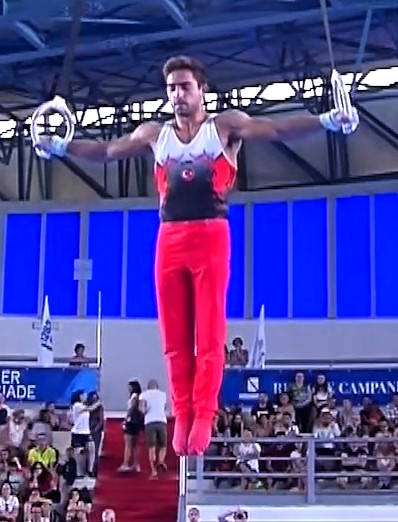
Çolak on rings at the 2019 Summer Universiade in Napoli

Çolak competed at the 2019 European Championships and finished tenth on the rings during the qualification round, making him the first reserve for the final. He then represented Turkey at the 2019 European Games and finished fourth in the rings final. He won the gold medal on the rings at the Mersin World Challenge Cup with a score of 15.000. At the 2019 World Artistic Gymnastics Championships held in Stuttgart, Germany, he won the gold medal in still rings with a score of 14.933. This was the first gold medal and the first medal for Turkey at the World Artistic Gymnastics Championships. This result also meant he qualified an individual spot for the 2020 Olympic Games.

Çolak competed at the 2020 European Championships in Mersin alongside Ferhat Arıcan, Adem Asil, Ahmet Önder, and Ümit Şamiloğlu. The team won the silver medal behind Ukraine which was Turkey's first ever team medal at the European Championships. Çolak then won the gold medal in the rings final with a score of 15.000 and became Turkey's first European champion in artistic gymnastics.

Çolak finished fifth in the rings final at the 2021 European Championships. At the 2020 Olympic Games, he qualified for the rings final where he finished fifth with a score of 14.866. He then competed at the 2021 World Championships and finished sixth in the rings final.

Çolak began the 2022 season by winning gold on the rings at the Cottbus World Cup. Then at the Cairo World Cup, he won the silver medal on rings behind Armenia's Vahagn Davtyan. Then at the Baku World Cup, he won the silver medal on rings behind Italian Salvatore Maresca. He then represented Turkey at the 2022 Mediterranean Games and helped the Turkish team win the gold medal. He then won the gold medal in the rings final. He won the bronze medal on rings at the Mersin World Challenge Cup.

Çolak competed at the 2023 DTB Pokal Stuttgart in the team challenge, and the Turkish team won the bronze medal behind the United States and Japan.

== Eponymous skill ==
Çolak had a new rings skill named after him in the Code of Points at the 2017 Melbourne World Cup.

Apparatus	Name	Description	Difficulty (Note: Valid for the 2022–2024 Code of Points)	Added to Code of Points
Still rings	Colak	Vertical pull up with straight arms to V-cross	E	2017 Melbourne World Cup
