= Ahmet Önder =

Turkish gymnast (born 1996)

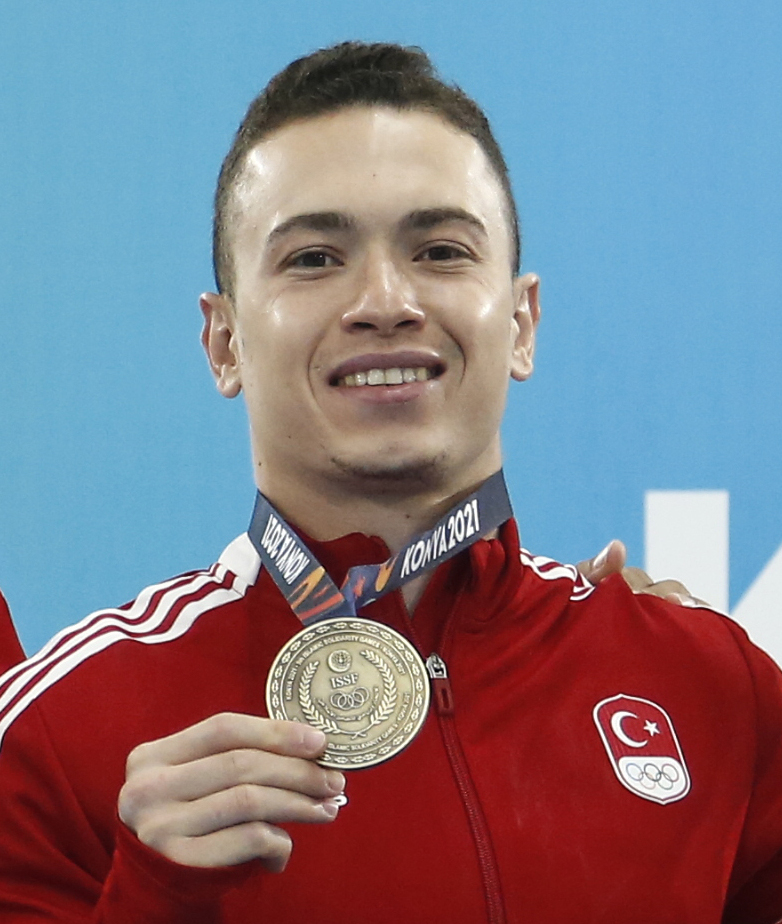
- Önder at the 2021 Islamic Solidarity Games

Personal information
- Born: 11 July 1996 (age 30) Ödemiş, Turkey
- Height: 1.70 m (5 ft 7 in)

Gymnastics career
- Country represented: Turkey (2014–2026)
- College team: Ege University
- Training location: Istanbul, Turkey
- Club: Savkar Cimnastik Spor Kulubu
- Retired: July 17, 2026
Medal record
Men's artistic gymnastics
Representing Turkey
World Championships
Silver medal – second place	2019 Stuttgart	Parallel bars
European Championships
Silver medal – second place	2020 Mersin	Team
Silver medal – second place	2022 Munich	All-around
Silver medal – second place	2023 Antalya	Team
Bronze medal – third place	2022 Munich	Team
European Games
Silver medal – second place	2019 Minsk	Horizontal bar
Mediterranean Games
Gold medal – first place	2018 Tarragona	Parallel bars
Gold medal – first place	2022 Oran	Team
Silver medal – second place	2018 Tarragona	Team
Silver medal – second place	2018 Tarragona	Floor exercise
Silver medal – second place	2018 Tarragona	Vault
Silver medal – second place	2022 Oran	Floor exercise
Bronze medal – third place	2018 Tarragona	All-around
Bronze medal – third place	2022 Oran	Horizontal bar
Islamic Solidarity Games
Gold medal – first place	2017 Baku	Team
Gold medal – first place	2017 Baku	Vault
Gold medal – first place	2021 Konya	Team
Gold medal – first place	2021 Konya	Horizontal bar
Gold medal – first place	2021 Konya	Floor
Silver medal – second place	2021 Konya	Parallel bars
Bronze medal – third place	2017 Baku	All-around
Bronze medal – third place	2017 Baku	Horizontal bar
Bronze medal – third place	2021 Konya	Rings
Bronze medal – third place	2021 Konya	Vault

Ahmet Önder (born 11 July 1996) is a Turkish artistic gymnast. He represented Turkey at the 2020 and 2024 Olympic Games. He is the 2019 World silver medalist on the parallel bars.

== Early life ==
Önder was born in Ödemiş, Turkey in 1996. He was inspired to try gymnastics after watching the 2004 Olympic Games on television.

== Gymnastics career ==
=== 2019 ===
Önder competed at various World Cups throughout the year. At the European Championships he placed fifth in the all-around. At the European Games he won silver on horizontal bar behind Robert Tvorogal of Lithuania. In October Önder competed at the World Championships where he won silver on parallel bars behind Joe Fraser. This medal, alongside İbrahim Çolak's gold medal on rings, were the first medals won by Turkish gymnasts at the World Championships. Additionally, due to being a top-three finisher on an apparatus not part of a qualified team, Önder was able to qualify as an individual to the upcoming 2020 Olympic Games.

=== 2020 ===
Önder competed at the Baku World Cup; however the competition was canceled after qualifications due to the COVID-19 pandemic. Many other competitions were either canceled or postponed throughout the year. In December the European Championships were held. Önder helped Turkey win the silver medal behind Ukraine in the team competition. Individually Önder placed fourth on floor exercise and eighth on vault and horizontal bar.

=== 2021 ===
Önder competed at the European Championships where he placed fourth in the all-around and on floor exercise, fifth on horizontal bar, and eighth on parallel bars. At the 2020 Olympic Games Önder qualified to both the all-around and vault event finals where he finished twenty-fourth and seventh respectively. At the World Championships Önder finished fifth in the all-around, setting a record as the highest placing Turkish gymnast at a World Championships, beating his previous record of ninth set in 2017.

=== 2022 ===
Önder started the year competing at the Osijek Challenge Cup. He competed at the Mediterranean Games where he helped Turkey win gold in the team event. Individually he won silver on floor exercise behind Nicola Bartolini and bronze on horizontal bar behind Marios Georgiou and Adem Asil. Önder next competed at the Islamic Solidarity Games where he helped Turkey once again win gold in the team event. Individually he won gold on floor exercise and horizontal bar, silver on parallel bars, and bronze on rings and vault.

In August Önder competed at the 2022 European Championships. On the first day of competition he won silver in the all-around behind Joe Fraser. He then helped Turkey win bronze in the team event.

=== 2026 ===
Önder announced his retirement from gymnastics on July 17, 2026.

== Competitive history ==
Competitive history of Ahmet Önder
Year	Event	Team	AA	FX	PH	SR	VT	PB	HB
2014
2014	World Championships	25	56						
2015	Cottbus World Cup						13		
2015	Doha World Cup							6	
2015	European Championships		31						
2015	Varna Challenge Cup						8	3rd place, bronze medalist(s)	5
2015	Osijek Challenge Cup							7	
2016	Baku World Cup			4			3rd place, bronze medalist(s)	6	2nd place, silver medalist(s)
2016	Doha World Cup			4				8	4
2016	Osijek Challenge Cup			6					6
2016	European Championships	11							
2016	Mersin Challenge Cup			3rd place, bronze medalist(s)			1st place, gold medalist(s)	3rd place, bronze medalist(s)	3rd place, bronze medalist(s)
2017	Melbourne World Cup			5		8	4	8	WD
2017	Islamic Solidarity Games	1st place, gold medalist(s)		3rd place, bronze medalist(s)			1st place, gold medalist(s)		3rd place, bronze medalist(s)
2017	Szombathely Challenge Cup			3rd place, bronze medalist(s)			4	3rd place, bronze medalist(s)	5
2017	World Championships		9						
2017	Mexican Open		3rd place, bronze medalist(s)						
2018	Turkish Championships		1st place, gold medalist(s)	1st place, gold medalist(s)	2nd place, silver medalist(s)	2nd place, silver medalist(s)	1st place, gold medalist(s)	1st place, gold medalist(s)	1st place, gold medalist(s)
2018	Osijek Challenge Cup						8		
2018	Koper Challenge Cup						7		
2018	Mediterranean Games	2nd place, silver medalist(s)	3rd place, bronze medalist(s)	2nd place, silver medalist(s)			2nd place, silver medalist(s)	1st place, gold medalist(s)	
2018	Mersin Challenge Cup			1st place, gold medalist(s)			4	2nd place, silver medalist(s)	
2018	European Championships			8				5	
2018	Paris Challenge Cup							3rd place, bronze medalist(s)	
2018	World Championships		15	9					
2018	Cottbus World Cup			7					
2019	Melbourne World Cup			8				2nd place, silver medalist(s)	6
2019	Turkish Championships		1st place, gold medalist(s)	3rd place, bronze medalist(s)	2nd place, silver medalist(s)	2nd place, silver medalist(s)		2nd place, silver medalist(s)	2nd place, silver medalist(s)
2019	Doha World Cup			5					
2019	European Championships		5	7				5	7
2019	European Games								2nd place, silver medalist(s)
2019	Mersin Challenge Cup					3rd place, bronze medalist(s)		2nd place, silver medalist(s)	2nd place, silver medalist(s)
2019	World Championships	15						2nd place, silver medalist(s)	
2020	Turkish Championships		2nd place, silver medalist(s)	5	2nd place, silver medalist(s)				
2020	Baku World Cup							6	
2020	European Championships	2nd place, silver medalist(s)		4			8		8
2021	Turkish Championships		2nd place, silver medalist(s)	1st place, gold medalist(s)	2nd place, silver medalist(s)	4	2nd place, silver medalist(s)	1st place, gold medalist(s)	1st place, gold medalist(s)
2021	European Championships		4	4				8	5
2021	Doha World Cup			6		8		8	4
2021	Olympic Games		24				7		
2021	Turkish Team Championships	1st place, gold medalist(s)							
2021	World Championships		5						
2022	Osijek Challenge Cup				2nd place, silver medalist(s)				4
2022	Mediterranean Games	1st place, gold medalist(s)	WD	2nd place, silver medalist(s)			8	4	3rd place, bronze medalist(s)
2022	Islamic Solidarity Games	1st place, gold medalist(s)		1st place, gold medalist(s)		3rd place, bronze medalist(s)	3rd place, bronze medalist(s)	2nd place, silver medalist(s)	1st place, gold medalist(s)
2022	European Championships	3rd place, bronze medalist(s)	2nd place, silver medalist(s)	8				6	8
2022	World Championships	11							
2023
2023	European Championships	2nd place, silver medalist(s)	21						
2023	Mersin Challenge Cup			1st place, gold medalist(s)				3rd place, bronze medalist(s)	1st place, gold medalist(s)
2023	World Championships	10	22						
2024
2024	Olympic Games	9							
