= Ana Đerek =

Croatian artistic gymnast (born 1998)

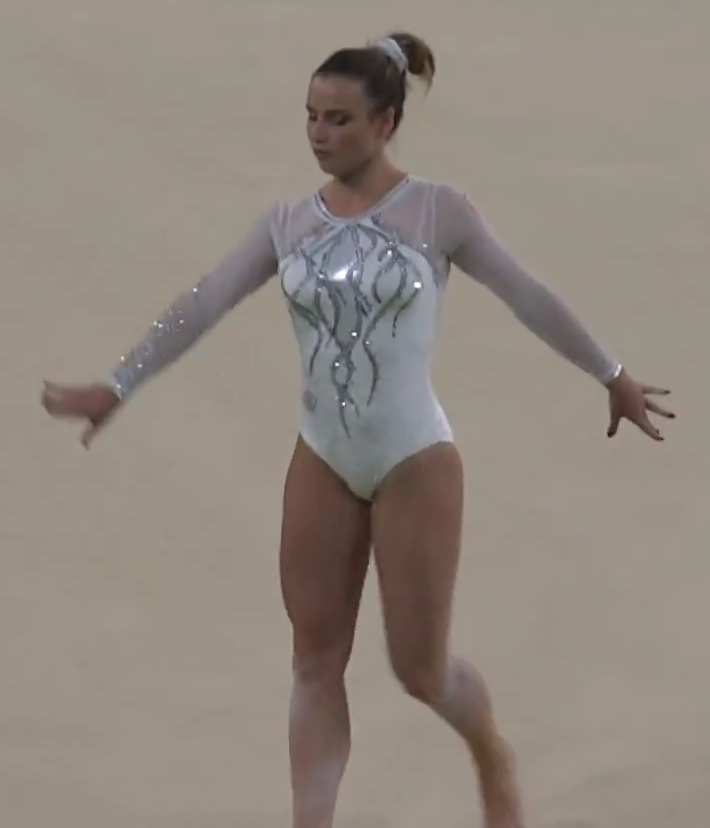
- Đerek at the 2016 Summer Olympics

Personal information
- Full name: Ana Đerek
- Born: 4 September 1998 (age 28)
- Height: 1.64 m (5 ft 5 in)

Gymnastics career
- Discipline: Women's artistic gymnastics
- Country represented: Croatia; (2015–present)
- Club: GK Marjan
- Head coach: Magda Ilić
- Awards: Shooting Star Award (2020)
Medal record
Representing Croatia
FIG World Cup
Event	1st	2nd	3rd
World Cup	1	0	1
World Challenge Cup	3	5	4
Total	4	5	5

Ana Đerek (born 4 September 1998) is a Croatian artistic gymnast. She represented Croatia at the 2016 and 2020 Olympic Games.

== Gymnastics career ==
At the 2016 Olympics in Rio de Janeiro, Đerek attained a score of 11.433 on the balance beam and a 13.200 on the floor exercises, but on vault she mistimed her steps and ran over the vaulting table, which resulted in an empty score and her withdrawal from the starting list on the uneven bars. Consequently, Đerek did not rank in the qualification phase of the individual all-around competition.

At the Doha World Cup on 25 March 2017, Đerek attained a score of 12.833 on the balance beam and a 12.900 in the floor exercise finals, winning bronze for the latter.

At the World Cup Series in Baku on 18 March 2018, Đerek scored 13.533 points on the floor exercise final to win gold.

In 2019, Đerek qualified for the 2020 Summer Olympics via the 2019 World Artistic Gymnastics Championships held in Stuttgart. In the qualification phase held in Tokyo on 25 July 2021 (postponed from 2020 because of the COVID-19 pandemic), she attained a score of 11.633 on balance beam and a 12.433 in the floor exercise.
