= Zoltán Kállai =

Hungarian gymnast

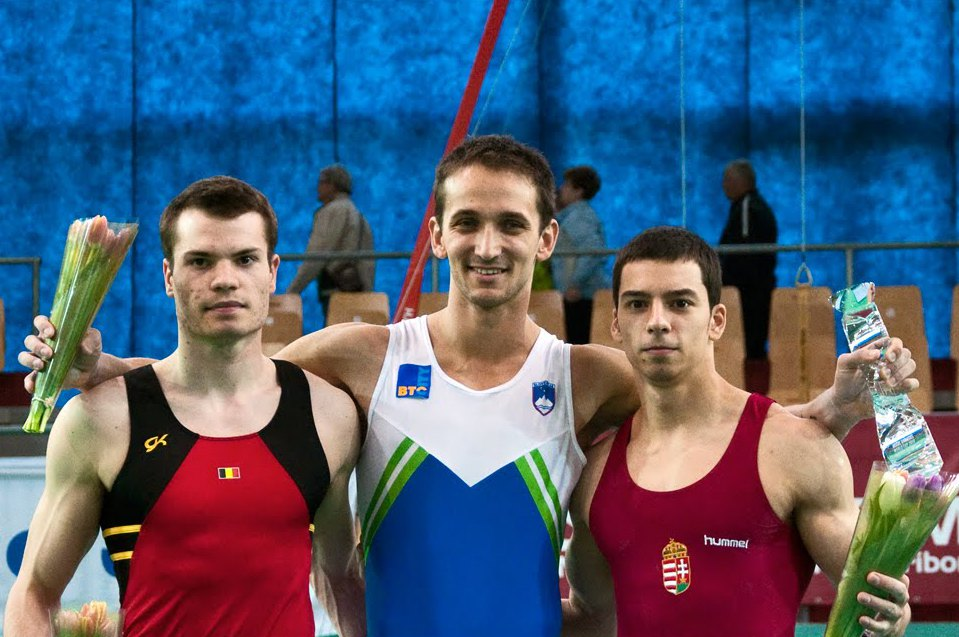
- Zoltán Kállai (first from right)

Personal information
- Born: 25 December 1984 (age 41)

Gymnastics career
- Discipline: Men's artistic gymnastics
- Country represented: Hungary; (2009)

Zoltán Kállai (born 25 December 1984) is a Hungarian male artistic gymnast, representing his nation at international competitions. He competed at world championships, including the 2009 World Artistic Gymnastics Championships in London, United Kingdom.
