= European Artistic Gymnastics Championships =

European Artistic Gymnastics Championships part of European Gymnastics Championships may refer to:

- European Men's Artistic Gymnastics Championships
- European Women's Artistic Gymnastics Championships
- European Men's and Women's Artistic Gymnastics Individual Championships
