= Aleko Mulos =

Turkish gymnast

Gymnastics career
- Discipline: Men's artistic gymnastics
- Country represented: Turkey
- Gym: Tatavla Heraklis Gymnastics Club; Galatasaray High School

Aleko Mulos (Greek: Αλέκο Μούλο, romanized: Aleko Mulo, also written Moullos), was an Olympian Ottoman gymnast of Greek ancestry.

It is known that he studied at the French-language Galatasaray High School in Istanbul, and performed gymnastics in the Tatavla Heraklis Gymnastics Club, an Ottoma Greek sports club located in the Kurtuluş neighborhood of Istanbul, a place originally called Tatavla by the Greek residents.

Mulos competed in the men's artistic individual all-around event at the 1908 Summer Olympics. Out of 96 competitors, he shared 67th place. During the Olympics, the Ottoman Empire was referred to as Turkey. It was the first recognized appearance of the Ottoman State, though at least two athletes from Smyrna had previously competed for Greece in 1896.
