= 2024 in gymnastics =

The following are the events of gymnastics for the year 2024 throughout the world. The main event in this year is 2024 Summer Olympics in (France) Paris

== Olympic Games ==
- July 27 – August 10: 2024 Summer Olympics in (France) Paris

== Other multi-sport events ==
- October 23–31: 2024 Summer Gymnasiade in (Bahrain) Manama

== Acrobatic gymnastics ==
- FIG Calendar: here

=== World Championships ===
- September 12–15: 13th FIG Acrobatic Gymnastics World Age Group Competitions in (Portugal) Guimarães
- September 19–22: 2024 Acrobatic Gymnastics World Championships in (Portugal) Guimarães

=== 2024 FIG Acrobatic Gymnastics World Cup series ===
- May 10–12: AG World Cup #1 in (Bulgaria) Burgas
- May 17–19: AG World Cup #2 in (Portugal) Maia
- May 31 – June 2: AG World Cup #3 (final) in (Poland) Rzeszów

== Aerobic gymnastics ==
- FIG Calendar: here

=== World & Continental Championships ===
- April 21 – 28: 2024 Pacific Rim Gymnastics Championships in (Colombia) Cali
- June 8 – 10: 2024 Asian Aerobic Gymnastics Championships in (Vietnam) Hanoi
- September 20–22: 2024 FIG Aerobic Gymnastics World Age Group Competitions in (Italy) Pesaro
- September 27– 29: 2024 Aerobic Gymnastics World Championships in (Italy) Pesaro

=== 2024 FIG Aerobic Gymnastics World Cup series ===
- March 22–24: AEG World Cup #1 in (Portugal) Cantanhede
  - Men's individual winner: (Italy) Davide Nacci
  - Women's individual winner: (Ukraine) Anastasia Kurashvili
  - Mixed pair winners: (Ukraine) Stanislav Halaida & (Ukraine) Anastasia Kurashvili
  - Trio winners: Italy (Sara Cutini, Davide Nacci & Francesco Sebastio)
  - Group winners: Italy (Anna Bullo, Sara Cutini, Matteo Falera, Davide Nacci & Francesco Sebastio)
- May 25–26: AEG World Cup #2 in (Japan) Yokohama

=== International Tournaments ===
- March 20–24: Cantanhede International Open Competition in (Portugal) Cantanhede
- April 12–14: Slovak Aerobic Open in (Slovakia) Bratislava
- April 18–21: Czech Aerobic Open in (Czech Republic) Prague
- May 10–12: Lithuanian Open Championship in (Lithuania) Kaunas
- August 30 – September 1: Plovdiv Cup Aerobics Open in (Bulgaria) Plovdiv

== Artistic gymnastics ==
- FIG Calendar: here

=== World & Continental Championships ===
- April 21 – 28: 2024 Pacific Rim Gymnastics Championships in (Colombia) Cali
- April 24 – 28: 2024 European Men's Artistic Gymnastics Championships in (Italy) Rimini
- May 2 – 5: 2024 European Women's Artistic Gymnastics Championships in (Italy) Rimini
- May 3 – 6: 2024 African Artistic Gymnastics Championships in (Morocco) Marrakesh
- May 16 – 19: 2024 Asian Men's Artistic Gymnastics Championships in (Uzbekistan) Tashkent
- May 22 – 26: 2024 Pan American Artistic Gymnastics Championships in (Colombia) Santa Marta
- May 24 – 26: 2024 Asian Women's Artistic Gymnastics Championships in (Uzbekistan) Tashkent
- May 25 – 26: 2024 Oceanian Artistic Gymnastics Championships in (New Zealand) Auckland

=== 2024 FIG Artistic Gymnastics World Cup series ===
- February 15–18: AG World Cup #1 in (Egypt) Cairo

  - Men's Floor Exercise: (South Korea) Ryu Sung-hyun
  - Men's Pommel Horse: (Jordan) Ahmad Abu Al-Soud
  - Men's Rings: (North Korea) Jong Ryong-il
  - Men's Vault: (Armenia) Artur Davtyan
  - Men's Parallel Bars: (Ukraine) Illia Kovtun
  - Men's Horizontal Bar: (Chinese Taipei) Tang Chia-hung
  - Women's Vault: (North Korea) An Chang-ok
  - Women's Uneven Bars: (China) Huang Zhuofan
  - Women's Balance Beam: (Belgium) Nina Derwael
  - Women's Floor Exercise: (Japan) Mana Okamura

- February 22–25: AG World Cup #2 in (Germany) Cottbus

  - Men's Floor Exercise: (United Kingdom) Harry Hepworth
  - Men's Pommel Horse: (Kazakhstan) Nariman Kurbanov
  - Men's Rings: (Azerbaijan) Nikita Simonov
  - Men's Vault: (Armenia) Artur Davtyan
  - Men's Parallel Bars: (Ukraine) Illia Kovtun
  - Men's Horizontal Bar: (Chinese Taipei) Tang Chia-hung
  - Women's Vault: (North Korea) An Chang-ok
  - Women's Uneven Bars: (Algeria) Kaylia Nemour
  - Women's Balance Beam: (China) Zhou Yaqin
  - Women's Floor Exercise: (China) Zhou Yaqin

- March 7–10: AG World Cup #3 in (Azerbaijan) Baku

  - Men's Floor Exercise: Yahor Sharamkou
  - Men's Pommel Horse: (Chinese Taipei) Lee Chih-kai & (United States) Stephen Nedoroscik
  - Men's Rings: (China) You Hao
  - Men's Vault: (Ukraine) Nazar Chepurnyi
  - Men's Parallel Bars: (Ukraine) Illia Kovtun
  - Men's Horizontal Bar: (Lithuania) Robert Tvorogal
  - Women's Vault: (Bulgaria) Valentina Georgieva
  - Women's Uneven Bars: (Algeria) Kaylia Nemour
  - Women's Balance Beam: (China) Zhang Qingying
  - Women's Floor Exercise: (Austria) Charlize Mörz

- April 17–20: AG World Cup #4 (final) in (Qatar) Doha

  - Men's Floor Exercise: (Kazakhstan) Milad Karimi
  - Men's Pommel Horse: (Jordan) Ahmad Abu Al-Soud
  - Men's Rings: (Armenia) Vahagn Davtyan
  - Men's Vault: (Armenia) Artur Davtyan
  - Men's Parallel Bars: (Philippines) Carlos Yulo
  - Men's Horizontal Bar: (Chinese Taipei) Tang Chia-hung
  - Women's Vault: (Panama) Karla Navas
  - Women's Uneven Bars: (Algeria) Kaylia Nemour
  - Women's Balance Beam: (Ukraine) Anna Lashchevska
  - Women's Floor Exercise: (Algeria) Kaylia Nemour

=== 2024 FIG Artistic Gymnastics World Challenge Cup series ===
- March 29–31: AGWCC #1 in (Turkey) Antalya

  - Men's Floor Exercise: (Turkey) Adem Asil
  - Men's Pommel Horse: (Jordan) Ahmad Abu Al-Soud
  - Men's Rings: (Turkey) İbrahim Çolak
  - Men's Vault: (Kazakhstan) Assan Salimov
  - Men's Parallel Bars: (Spain) Nicolau Mir
  - Men's Horizontal Bar: (Spain) Joel Plata
  - Women's Vault: (Slovenia) Tjaša Kysselef
  - Women's Uneven Bars: (France) Mélanie de Jesus dos Santos
  - Women's Balance Beam: (China) Sun Xinyi
  - Women's Floor Exercise: (Brazil) Jade Barbosa

- April 4–7: AGWCC #2 in (Croatia) Osijek

  - Men's Floor Exercise: (Ukraine) Illia Kovtun
  - Men's Pommel Horse: (Kazakhstan) Ilyas Azizov
  - Men's Rings: (Bulgaria) Kevin Penev
  - Men's Vault: (Croatia) Aurel Benović
  - Men's Parallel Bars: (Germany) Lukas Dauser
  - Men's Horizontal Bar: (Chinese Taipei) Tang Chia-hung
  - Women's Vault: (France) Coline Devillard
  - Women's Uneven Bars: (France) Mélanie de Jesus dos Santos
  - Women's Balance Beam: (Ukraine) Anna Lashchevska
  - Women's Floor Exercise: (France) Mélanie de Jesus dos Santos

- May 23–26: AGWCC #3 in (Bulgaria) Varna

  - Men's Floor Exercise: (Kazakhstan) Dmitriy Patanin
  - Men's Pommel Horse: (Kazakhstan) Nariman Kurbanov
  - Men's Rings: (Armenia) Artur Avetisyan
  - Men's Vault: (Ukraine) Nazar Chepurnyi
  - Men's Parallel Bars: (France) Cameron-Lie Bernard
  - Men's Horizontal Bar: (Bulgaria) Yordan Aleksandrov
  - Women's Vault: (Bulgaria) Valentina Georgieva
  - Women's Uneven Bars: (Germany) Elisabeth Seitz
  - Women's Balance Beam: (France) Lucie Henna
  - Women's Floor Exercise: (United Kingdom) Ruby Evans

- May 30–June 2: AGWCC #4 in (Slovenia) Koper

  - Men's Floor Exercise: (Ukraine) Illia Kovtun
  - Men's Pommel Horse: (Ukraine) Illia Kovtun
  - Men's Rings: (Ukraine) Igor Radivilov
  - Men's Vault: (Spain) Pau Jimenez
  - Men's Parallel Bars: (Ukraine) Illia Kovtun
  - Men's Horizontal Bar: (Chinese Taipei) Tang Chia-hung
  - Women's Vault: (Mexico) Alexa Moreno
  - Women's Uneven Bars: (Slovenia) Lucija Hribar
  - Women's Balance Beam: (Italy) Veronica Mandriota
  - Women's Floor Exercise: (Switzerland) Lena Bickel

- October 4–6: AGWCC #5 (final) in (Hungary) Szombathely

=== FIG International Tournaments ===
- March 8–10: International GYMNIX 2024 & International Junior GYMNIX 2024 in (Canada) Montreal
  - Results: here
- March 15–17: AGF Trophy International Tournament 2024 in (Azerbaijan) Baku
  - Results: here
- March 15–17: EnBW DTB Pokal Team Challenge 2024 & EnBW DTB Pokal Mixed Cup 2024 in (Germany) Stuttgart
  - Results: here
- March 21–24: Grizzly Classic in (Canada) Airdrie
  - Results: here
- April 5: Five Ways U18-ITA-FRA-GBR-GER-SUI in (Italy) Ravenna
- April 6: Friendly Match U15 FRA-GBR-GER-SUI in (Switzerland) Magglingen
- April 5–8: Juegos Bolivarianos Juveniles 2024 in (Bolivia) Sucre
- April 12–13: Luxembourg Open 2024 in Luxembourg
- April 20–21: XV Trofeo Citta di Jesolo in (Italy) Jesolo
- June 5–9: 55th Šalamunov memorial 2024 in (Slovenia) Maribor
- June 29: Tournoi Seniors FRA/GBR/GER/ITA/SUI in (France) Troyes
- July 6: Senior - FRA/GBR/GER/SUI in (France) Haguenau

== Parkour ==
- FIG Calendar: here

=== 2024 FIG Parkour World Cup series ===
- May 10–12: World Cup #1 in (France) Montpellier
- September 13–15: World Cup #2 in (Portugal) Coimbra

== Rhythmic gymnastics ==
- FIG Calendar: here
- Other Tournaments Results: here.

=== World & Continental Championships ===
- April 21 – 28: 2024 Pacific Rim Gymnastics Championships in (Colombia) Cali
- April 25–26: 2024 African Rhythmic Gymnastics Championships in (Rwanda) Kigali
- May 2 – 4: 2024 Asian Rhythmic Gymnastics Championships in (Uzbekistan) Tashkent
- May 22 – 26: 2024 Rhythmic Gymnastics European Championships in (Hungary) Budapest
- May 22 – 26: 2024 Rhythmic Gymnastics Oceania Championships in (Hungary) Budapest
- June 7 – 9: 2024 Pan American Rhythmic Gymnastics Championships in Guatemala City

=== 2024 FIG Rhythmic Gymnastics World Cup series ===
- March 22–24: RG World Cup #1 in (Greece) Athens

  - All-around: (Bulgaria) Elvira Krasnobaeva
  - Hoop: (Bulgaria) Elvira Krasnobaeva
  - Ball: (Israel) Daniela Munits
  - Clubs: (China) Wang Zilu
  - Ribbon: (Authorised Neutral Athletes) Alina Harnasko
  - Group all-around: Israel
  - 5 Hoops: Italy
  - 3 Ribbons and 2 Balls: Poland

- April 12–14: RG World Cup #2 in (Bulgaria) Sofia

  - All-around: (Bulgaria) Boryana Kaleyn
  - Hoop: (Israel) Daria Atamanov
  - Ball: (Bulgaria) Stiliana Nikolova
  - Clubs: (Italy) Sofia Raffaeli
  - Ribbon: (Bulgaria) Stiliana Nikolova
  - Group all-around: Israel
  - 5 Hoops: Israel
  - 3 Ribbons and 2 Balls: Israel

- April 19–21: RG World Cup #3 in (Azerbaijan) Baku

  - All-around: (Germany) Darja Varfolomeev
  - Hoop: (Germany) Darja Varfolomeev
  - Ball: (Germany) Darja Varfolomeev
  - Clubs: (Italy) Sofia Raffaeli
  - Ribbon: (Germany) Darja Varfolomeev
  - Group all-around: Spain
  - 5 Hoops: Japan
  - 3 Ribbons and 2 Balls: Japan

- April 26–28: RG World Cup #4 in (Uzbekistan) Tashkent

  - All-around: (Germany) Darja Varfolomeev
  - Hoop: (Uzbekistan) Takhmina Ikromova
  - Ball: (Uzbekistan) Takhmina Ikromova
  - Clubs: (Germany) Darja Varfolomeev
  - Ribbon: (Germany) Darja Varfolomeev
  - Group all-around: China
  - 5 Hoops: China
  - 3 Ribbons and 2 Balls: France

- June 21–23: RG World Cup #5 (final) in (Italy) Milan

  - All-around: (Germany) Darja Varfolomeev
  - Hoop: (Italy) Sofia Raffaeli
  - Ball: (Germany) Darja Varfolomeev
  - Clubs: (Germany) Darja Varfolomeev
  - Ribbon: (Germany) Darja Varfolomeev
  - Group all-around: China
  - 5 Hoops: China
  - 3 Ribbons and 2 Balls: Brazil

=== 2024 FIG Rhythmic Gymnastics World Challenge Cup series ===
- May 10–12: RGWCC #1 in (Portugal) Portimão
- June 26–28: RGWCC #2 in (Israel) Jerusalem
  - Event was cancelled
- July 12–14: RGWCC #3 (final) in (Romania) Cluj-Napoca

=== FIG International Tournaments ===
- February 10–11: LUXGR Cup in Luxembourg City
  - Seniors
  - All-around: (Azerbaijan) Kamilla Seyidzade
  - Hoop: (Israel) Yuval Mandelgeim
  - Ball: (Israel) Yuval Mandelgeim
  - Clubs: (Azerbaijan) Kamilla Seyidzade
  - Ribbon: (Israel) Yuval Mandelgeim
- February 16–18: 28. International Tournament-Gracia Fair Cup in (Hungary) Budapest
  - Seniors
  - All-around: (Bulgaria) Nikol Todorova
  - Hoop: (Kazakhstan) Erika Zhailauova
  - Ball: (Kazakhstan) Aibota Yertaikyzy
  - Clubs: (Kazakhstan) Aibota Yertaikyzy
  - Ribbon: (Kazakhstan) Aibota Yertaikyzy
- February 22–25: Irina Deleanu Cup in (Romania) Ploiești
  - Seniors
  - All-around: (Romania) Christina Dragan
  - Hoop: (Romania) Christina Dragan
  - Ball: (Romania) Christina Dragan
  - Clubs: (Romania) Sabina Enache
  - Ribbon: (Romania) Christina Dragan
- March 1–3: Miss Valentine in (Estonia) Tartu
  - Seniors
  - Group All-around: Ukraine
  - 3 Ball 2 Ribbon: Ukraine
  - 5 Hoop: Ukraine
- March 2–3: Miss Valentine Tartu Grand Prix in (Estonia) Tartu
  - Seniors
  - All-around: (Ukraine) Viktoriia Onopriienko
  - Hoop: (Ukraine) Viktoriia Onopriienko
  - Ball: (Ukraine) Viktoriia Onopriienko
  - Clubs: (Ukraine) Taisiia Onofriichuk
  - Ribbon: (Ukraine) Viktoriia Onopriienko
- March 2–3: Gymnastik International in (Germany) Fellbach-Schmiden
  - Seniors
  - All-around: (Israel) Daniela Munits
  - Hoop: (Israel) Daniela Munits
  - Ball: (Germany) Darja Varfolomeev
  - Clubs: (Germany) Darja Varfolomeev
  - Ribbon: (Germany) Margarita Kolosov
- March 8–10: Grand Prix Marbella in (Spain) Marbella
  - Seniors
  - All-around: (Bulgaria) Stiliana Nikolova
  - Hoop: (Germany) Darja Varfolomeev
  - Ball: (Kazakhstan) Elzhana Taniyeva
  - Clubs: (Bulgaria) Stiliana Nikolova
  - Ribbon: (Bulgaria) Stiliana Nikolova
- March 15–17: International Tournament "9th Aphrodite Cup" in (Greece) Athens
  - Seniors
  - All-around: (Greece) Panagiota Lytra
  - Hoop: (Greece) Panagiota Lytra
  - Ball: (Kazakhstan) Erika Zhailauova
  - Clubs: (Kazakhstan) Aibota Yertaikyzy
  - Ribbon: (Kazakhstan) Aibota Yertaikyzy
- March 22–24: International Tournament «ALEM CUP» in (Kazakhstan) Astana
- March 30–31: Internationaux de Thiais in (France) Thiais
  - Seniors
  - All-around: (Uzbekistan) Takhmina Ikromova
  - Hoop: (Ukraine) Viktoriia Onopriienko
  - Ball: (Ukraine) Viktoriia Onopriienko
  - Clubs: (Slovenia) Ekaterina Vedeneeva
  - Ribbon: (Slovenia) Ekaterina Vedeneeva
- April 4–7: International Tournament Sofia Cup in (Bulgaria) Sofia
  - Seniors
  - All-around: (Bulgaria) Boryana Kaleyn
  - Hoop: (Bulgaria) Elvira Krasnobaeva
  - Ball: (Bulgaria) Elvira Krasnobaeva
  - Clubs: (Bulgaria) Elvira Krasnobaeva
  - Ribbon: (Bulgaria) Nikol Todorova
- April 5–7: MTM Narodni Dom Ljubljana in (Slovenia) Ljubljana
- April 5–7: International Tournament Tallinn Open in (Estonia) Tallinn
- April 19–21: Bosphorus Cup in (Turkey) Istanbul
  - Seniors
  - All-around: (Authorised Neutral Athletes) Daria Viarenich
  - Hoop: (Kazakhstan) Aiym Meirzhanova
  - Ball: (Turkey) Defne Eylül Kılıç
  - Clubs: (Authorised Neutral Athletes) Daria Viarenich
  - Ribbon: (Authorised Neutral Athletes) Daria Viarenich
- April 26–28: International Tournament for the Prize of Julieta Shishmanova in (Bulgaria) Burgas
- April 27–28: Ritam Cup in (Serbia) Belgrade
- May 3–5: European Cups in (Azerbaijan) Baku
- May 3–5: Gdynia Rhythmic Stars in (Poland) Gdynia
- May 4–6: International Tournament of Portimão in (Portugal) Portimão
- June 15–16: Grand Prix Brno TRL Space Cup 2024 in (Czech Republic) Brno
- June 28–30: Pharaohs Cup in (Egypt) Cairo
- August 31 – June 1: 29. International Tournament-Gracia Fair Cup in (Hungary) Budapest
- October 4–5: Dalia Kutkaite Cup in (Lithuania) Vilnius

== Trampolining & Tumbling ==
- FIG Calendar: here

=== World & Continental Championships ===
- April 3 – 7: 2024 European Trampoline Championships in (Portugal) Guimaraes
- April 21 – 28: 2024 Pacific Rim Gymnastics Championships in (Colombia) Cali
- May 10 – 11: 2024 African Trampoline Championships in (Tunisia) Bizerte
- May 11 – 12: 2024 Asian Trampoline Championships in Hong Kong
- May 17 – 19: 2024 Pan American Trampoline Championships in (Peru) Lima

=== 2024 Trampoline, Tumbling, & DMT World Cup series ===
- February 23–25: TT World Cup #1 in (Azerbaijan) Baku
  - Individual winners: (China) Wang Zisai (m) / (China) Zhu Xueying (w)
  - Synchronised winners: China (m) / United States (w)
  - Tumbling winners: (Azerbaijan) Mikhail Malkin (m) / (France) Candy Briere-Vetillard (w)
- March 13–14: TT World Cup #2 in Alkmaar
  - Individual winners: (Belgium) Darwin Billiet (m) / (Azerbaijan) Seljan Mahsudova (w)
  - Synchronised winners: Netherlands (m) / Netherlands (w)
- March 22–24: TT World Cup #3 in (Germany) Cottbus
  - Individual winners: (China) Yan Langyu (m) / (China) Hu Yicheng (w)
  - Synchronised winners: (Germany) Fabian Vogel & (Germany) Caio Lauxtermann (m) / (China) Cao Yunzhu & (China) Zhang Xinxin (w)
- June 28–29: TT World Cup #4 in (Switzerland) Arosa
- July 6–7: TT World Cup #5 (final) in (Portugal) Coimbra

=== International Tournaments ===
- March 16–17: Dutch Trampoline Open in (Netherlands) Alkmaar
  - Individual winners: (Germany) Lars Garmann (m) / (Azerbaijan) Seljan Mahsudova (w)
  - Synchronised winners: (Netherlands) Jordy Mol & Rick Veldhuizen (m) / (Netherlands) Claudia de Graaf & Romana Schuring (w)
- June 27–29: Nissen Cup Junior Competition in (Switzerland) Arosa
- July 5–7: Coimbra Gym Fest in (Portugal) Coimbra
- November 2–3: David Ward-Hunt Cup in (United Kingdom) Gillingham
