= 2024 in artistic gymnastics =

Below is a list of notable men's and women's artistic gymnastics international events held in 2024 as well as the medalists.

== Retirements ==
Gymnasts who announced retirements in 2024
Gymnast	Country	Date	Ref
Ivan Stretovich	Russia	9 January 2024	
Phạm Như Phương	Vietnam	15 January 2024	
Kelly Simm	Great Britain	30 January 2024	
Tara Donnelly	Isle of Man	4 February 2024	
Claudia Fragapane	Great Britain	9 February 2024	
Shannon Archer	Great Britain	17 March 2024	
Jutta Verkest	Belgium	15 April 2024	
Zoe Miller	United States	28 April 2024	
Amelie Morgan	Great Britain	30 April 2024	
Sophie Scheder	Germany	15 May 2024	
Luo Rui	China	22 May 2024	
Roxana Popa	Spain	30 May 2024	
Carolann Héduit	France	2 June 2024	
Katelyn Jong	United States	3 June 2024	
Addison Fatta	United States	4 June 2024	
Yana Vorona	Russia	22 July 2024	
Max Whitlock	Great Britain	3 August 2024	
Ana Filipa Martins	Portugal	1 September 2024	
Emma Spence	Canada	6 October 2024	
Dipa Karmakar	India	7 October 2024	
Vanessa Ferrari	Italy	9 October 2024	
Lukas Dauser	Germany	9 November 2024	
Christian Baumann	Switzerland	9 November 2024	
Harutyun Merdinyan	Armenia	10 November 2024	
Maellyse Brassart	Belgium	27 November 2024	
Igor Radivilov	Ukraine	1 December 2024	
Ian Gunther	United States	8 December 2024	

== Nationality changes ==
Gymnasts who changed nationalities in 2024
Gymnast	From	To	Ref
Adam Cogat	France	Algeria	
Salina Bousmayo	Germany	Morocco	
Charlotte Booth	United States	Great Britain	

== Calendar of events ==
Date	Location	Event	Men's winners	Women's winners
February 15–18	(Egypt) Cairo	FIG World Cup	FX: (South Korea) Ryu Sung-hyun; PH: (Jordan) Ahmad Abu Al-Soud; SR: (North Korea) Jong Ryong-il; VT: (Armenia) Artur Davtyan; PB: (Ukraine) Illia Kovtun; HB: (Chinese Taipei) Tang Chia-hung	VT: (North Korea) An Chang-ok; UB: (China) Huang Zhuofan; BB: (Belgium) Nina Derwael; FX: (Japan) Mana Okamura
February 22–25	(Germany) Cottbus	FIG World Cup	FX: (United Kingdom) Harry Hepworth; PH: (Kazakhstan) Nariman Kurbanov; SR: (Azerbaijan) Nikita Simonov; VT: (Armenia) Artur Davtyan; PB: (Ukraine) Illia Kovtun; HB: (Chinese Taipei) Tang Chia-hung	VT: (North Korea) An Chang-ok; UB: (Algeria) Kaylia Nemour; BB: (China) Zhou Yaqin; FX: (China) Zhou Yaqin
March 7–10	(Azerbaijan) Baku	FIG World Cup	FX: (Authorised Neutral Athletes) Yahor Sharamkou; PH: (Chinese Taipei) Lee Chih-kai / (United States) Stephen Nedoroscik; SR: (China) You Hao; VT: (Ukraine) Nazar Chepurnyi; PB: (Ukraine) Illia Kovtun; HB: (Lithuania) Robert Tvorogal	VT: (Bulgaria) Valentina Georgieva; UB: (Algeria) Kaylia Nemour; BB: (China) Zhang Qingying; FX: (Austria) Charlize Mörz
March 29–31	(Turkey) Antalya	FIG World Challenge Cup	FX: (Turkey) Adem Asil; PH: (Jordan) Ahmad Abu Al-Soud; SR: (Turkey) İbrahim Çolak; VT: (Kazakhstan) Assan Salimov; PB: (Spain) Nicolau Mir; HB: (Spain) Joel Plata	VT: (Slovenia) Tjaša Kysselef; UB: (France) Mélanie de Jesus dos Santos; BB: (China) Sun Xinyi; FX: (Brazil) Jade Barbosa
April 4–7	(Croatia) Osijek	FIG World Challenge Cup	FX: (Ukraine) Illia Kovtun; PH: (Kazakhstan) Ilyas Azizov; SR: (Bulgaria) Kevin Penev; VT: (Croatia) Aurel Benović; PB: (Germany) Lukas Dauser; HB: (Chinese Taipei) Tang Chia-hung	VT: (France) Coline Devillard; UB: (France) Mélanie de Jesus dos Santos; BB: (Ukraine) Anna Lashchevska; FX: (France) Mélanie de Jesus dos Santos
April 17–20	(Qatar) Doha	FIG World Cup	VT: (Kazakhstan) Milad Karimi; PH: (Jordan) Ahmad Abu Al-Soud; SR: (Armenia) Vahagn Davtyan; VT: (Armenia) Artur Davtyan; PB: (Philippines) Carlos Yulo; HB: (Chinese Taipei) Tang Chia-hung	VT: (Panama) Karla Navas; UB: (Algeria) Kaylia Nemour; BB: (Ukraine) Anna Lashchevska; FX: (Algeria) Kaylia Nemour
April 21–28	(Colombia) Cali	Pacific Rim Championships	Senior AA: (United States) Yul Moldauer; Junior AA: (Colombia) Camilo Vera	Senior AA: (United States) Jayla Hang; Junior AA: (Panama) Aliyah de León
April 24–28	(Italy) Rimini	European Championships	TF: Ukraine; AA: (Cyprus) Marios Georgiou; FX: (United Kingdom) Luke Whitehouse; PH: (Republic of Ireland) Rhys McClenaghan; SR: (Greece) Eleftherios Petrounias; VT: (United Kingdom) Jake Jarman; PB: (Ukraine) Illia Kovtun; HB: (Ukraine) Illia Kovtun	—N/a
May 2–5	(Italy) Rimini	European Championships	—N/a	TF: (Italy) Italy; AA: (Italy) Manila Esposito; VT: (France) Coline Devillard; UB: (Italy) Alice D'Amato; BB: (Italy) Manila Esposito; FX: (Italy) Manila Esposito
May 3–6	(Morocco) Marrakesh	African Championships	TF: Egypt; AA: (Egypt) Omar Mohamed; FX: (South Africa) Luke James; PH: (Egypt) Abdelrahman Abdelhaleem; SR: (Egypt) Ali Zahran; VT: (South Africa) Luke James; PB: (Egypt) Mohamed Afify; HB: (Egypt) Omar Mohamed	TF: Egypt; AA: (Egypt) Jana Mahmoud; VT: (South Africa) Caleigh Anders; UB: (Egypt) Judy Abdalla; BB: (Morocco) Salina Bousmayo; FX: (Egypt) Jana Mahmoud
May 16–19	(Uzbekistan) Tashkent	Asian Championships	TF: China; AA: (Philippines) Carlos Yulo; FX: (Philippines) Carlos Yulo; PH: (Kazakhstan) Nariman Kurbanov; SR: Yin Dehang; VT: (Philippines) Carlos Yulo; PB: (Philippines) Carlos Yulo; HB: (Kazakhstan) Milad Karimi	—N/a
May 19–26	(Colombia) Santa Marta	Pan American Championships	TF: Brazil; AA: Caio Souza; FX: (Mexico) Alonso Pérez; PH: Diogo Soares; SR: (Chile) Joaquín Álvarez; VT: Caio Souza; PB: (Colombia) Dilan Jiménez; HB: Diogo Soares	TF: Brazil; AA: (Mexico) Michelle Pineda; VT: (Panama) Karla Navas; UB: (Colombia) Daira Lamadrid; BB: (Mexico) Michelle Pineda; FX: (Argentina) Mia Mainardi
May 23–26	(Bulgaria) Varna	FIG World Challenge Cup	FX: (Kazakhstan) Dmitriy Patanin; PH: (Kazakhstan) Nariman Kurbanov; SR: (Armenia) Artur Avetisyan; VT: (Ukraine) Nazar Chepurnyi; PB: (France) Cameron-Lie Bernard; HB: (Bulgaria) Yordan Aleksandrov	VT: (Bulgaria) Valentina Georgieva; UB: (Germany) Elisabeth Seitz; BB: (France) Lucie Henna; FX: (United Kingdom) Ruby Evans
May 24–26	(Uzbekistan) Tashkent	Asian Championships	—N/a	TF: China; AA: (China) Hu Jiafei; VT: (India) Dipa Karmakar; UB: (China) Yang Fanyuwei; BB: (China) Qin Xinyi; FX: (Philippines) Emma Malabuyo
May 25–26	(New Zealand) Auckland	Oceania Championships	AA: (Australia) Jesse Moore	AA: (Australia) Emma Nedov
May 30–June 2	(Slovenia) Koper	FIG World Challenge Cup	FX: (Ukraine) Illia Kovtun; PH: (Ukraine) Illia Kovtun; SR: (Ukraine) Igor Radivilov; VT: (Spain) Pau Jiménez; PB: (Ukraine) Illia Kovtun; HB: (Chinese Taipei) Tang Chia-hung	VT: (Mexico) Alexa Moreno; UB: (Slovenia) Lucija Hribar; BB: (Italy) Veronica Mandriota; FX: (Switzerland) Lena Bickel
June 12–23	(Russia) Kazan	BRICS Games	AA: (Russia) Daniel Marinov; FX: (Belarus) Yahor Sharamkou; PH: (Russia) Vladislav Polyashov; SR: (Turkey) Yunus Emre Gündoğdu; VT: (Russia) Nikita Nagornyy; PB: (Russia) Daniel Marinov; HB: (Russia) Sergey Naydin	AA: (Russia) Leyla Vasilyeva; VT: (Russia) Anna Kalmykova; UB: (Russia) Angelina Melnikova; BB: (Russia) Mariya Agafonova; FX: (Russia) Anna Kalmykova
July 27–August 5	(France) Paris	Olympic Games	TF: Japan; AA: Shinnosuke Oka; FX: (Philippines) Carlos Yulo; PH: (Republic of Ireland) Rhys McClenaghan; SR: (China) Liu Yang; VT: (Philippines) Carlos Yulo; PB: (China) Zou Jingyuan; HB: Shinnosuke Oka	TF: United States; AA: Simone Biles; VT: Simone Biles; UB: (Algeria) Kaylia Nemour; BB: (Italy) Alice D’Amato; FX: (Brazil) Rebeca Andrade
September 20–22	(Republic of Ireland) Dublin	Northern European Championships	TF: Norway; AA: (Finland) Elias Koski; FX: (Scotland) Hamish Carter; PH: (Sweden) William Sundell; SR: (Sweden) Luis Il-Sung Melander; VT: (Norway) Sebastian Sponevik; PB: (Scotland) Euan McLellan; HB: (Finland) Elias Koski	TF: Ireland; AA: (Republic of Ireland) Emma Slevin; VT: (Iceland) Thelma Aðalsteinsdóttir; UB: (Iceland) Thelma Aðalsteinsdóttir; BB: (Iceland) Thelma Aðalsteinsdóttir; FX: (Iceland) Thelma Aðalsteinsdóttir
October 4–6	(Hungary) Szombathely	FIG World Challenge Cup	FX: (Hungary) Krisztofer Mészáros; PH: (Italy) Edoardo De Rosa; SR: (Azerbaijan) Nikita Simonov; VT: (Kazakhstan) Assan Salimov; PB: (Italy) Edoardo De Rosa; HB: (Hungary) Krisztofer Mészáros	VT: (Kazakhstan) Darya Yassinskaya; UB: (United Kingdom) Charlotte Booth; BB: (Sweden) Tonya Paulsson; FX: (Sweden) Tonya Paulsson
October 14–20	(Brazil) Aracaju	South American Championships	TF: Brazil; AA: (Brazil) Bernardo Actos; FX: (Brazil) Bernardo Actos; PH: (Argentina) Santiago Mayol / (Brazil) Johnny Oshiro; SR: (Argentina) Daniel Villafañe; VT: (Colombia) Juan Ramos; PB: (Venezuela) Adickxon Trejo; HB: (Peru) Edward Alarcón	TF: Brazil; AA: (Argentina) Milagros Curti; VT: (Panama) Karla Navas; UB: (Argentina) Sira Macias; BB: (Brazil) Maria Heloísa Moreno; FX: (Brazil) Hellen Silva
October 23–31	(Bahrain) Manama	Gymnasiade	TF: France; AA: (France) Naël Sakouhi; FX: (France) Naël Sakouhi; PH: (Hungary) Nándor Sas; SR: (Hungary) Zala Samu Zambori; VT: (Ukraine) Valentyn Havrylchenko; PB: (France) Naël Sakouhi; HB: (France) Naël Sakouhi	TF: France; AA: (Romania) Alexia Blanaru; VT: (Brazil) Nicole Campos; UB: (France) Romane Hamelin; BB: (France) Noélie Ayuso; FX: (France) Juliette Certain

== Medalists ==
=== Women ===
==== International events ====
Competition	Event	Gold	Silver	Bronze
Olympics	Team	United States	Italy	Brazil
Olympics	All-Around	(United States) Simone Biles	(Brazil) Rebeca Andrade	(United States) Sunisa Lee
Olympics	Vault	(United States) Simone Biles	(Brazil) Rebeca Andrade	(United States) Jade Carey
Olympics	Uneven Bars	(Algeria) Kaylia Nemour	(China) Qiu Qiyuan	(United States) Sunisa Lee
Olympics	Balance Beam	(Italy) Alice D’Amato	(China) Zhou Yaqin	(Italy) Manila Esposito
Olympics	Floor Exercise	(Brazil) Rebeca Andrade	(United States) Simone Biles	(Romania) Ana Bărbosu

==== Regional championships ====
Competition	Event	Gold	Silver	Bronze
African	Team	Egypt	South Africa	Morocco
African	All-Around	(Egypt) Jana Mahmoud	(Egypt) Judy Abdalla	(Morocco) Salina Bousmayo
African	Vault	(South Africa) Caleigh Anders	(Egypt) Judy Abdalla	(Egypt) Sandra Elsadek
African	Uneven Bars	(Egypt) Judy Abdalla	(Egypt) Shams Ali	(South Africa) Zelme Daries
African	Balance Beam	(Morocco) Salina Bousmayo	(South Africa) Naveen Daries	(Egypt) Sandra Elsadek
African	Floor Exercise	(Egypt) Jana Mahmoud	(Egypt) Judy Abdalla	(Morocco) Salina Bousmayo
Asian	Team	China	North Korea	Uzbekistan
Asian	All-Around	(China) Hu Jiafei	(China) Qin Xinyi	(Philippines) Emma Malabuyo
Asian	Vault	(India) Dipa Karmakar	(North Korea) Kim Son-hyang	(North Korea) Jo Kyong-byol
Asian	Uneven Bars	(China) Yang Fanyuwei	(North Korea) Jon Jang-mi	(Philippines) Levi Ruivivar
Asian	Balance Beam	(China) Qin Xinyi	(China) Chen Xinyi	(North Korea) Kim Son-hyang
Asian	Floor Exercise	(Philippines) Emma Malabuyo	(China) Chen Xinyi	(Kazakhstan) Aida Bauyrzhanova
European	Team	Italy	(United Kingdom) Great Britain	France
European	All-Around	(Italy) Manila Esposito	(Italy) Alice D'Amato	(United Kingdom) Alice Kinsella
European	Vault	(France) Coline Devillard	(Bulgaria) Valentina Georgieva	(France) Ming Van Eijken
European	Uneven Bars	(Italy) Alice D'Amato	(Italy) Elisa Iorio	(United Kingdom) Georgia Mae-Fenton
European	Balance Beam	(Italy) Manila Esposito	(Romania) Sabrina Voinea	(France) Marine Boyer
European	Floor Exercise	(Italy) Manila Esposito	(Romania) Sabrina Voinea	(Italy) Angela Andreoli
Oceania	All-Around	(Australia) Emma Nedov	(Australia) Kate Sayer	(New Zealand) Isabella Brett
Pan American	Team	Brazil	Canada	Mexico
Pan American	All-Around	(Mexico) Michelle Pineda	(Argentina) Mia Mainardi	(Brazil) Andreza Lima
Pan American	Vault	(Panama) Karla Navas	(Panama) Hillary Heron	(Canada) Emma Spence
Pan American	Uneven Bars	(Colombia) Daira Lamadrid	(Canada) Sydney Turner	(Argentina) Meline Mesropian
Pan American	Balance Beam	(Mexico) Michelle Pineda	(Brazil) Andreza Lima	(Canada) Sydney Turner
Pan American	Floor Exercise	(Argentina) Mia Mainardi	(Brazil) Hellen Silva (Mexico) Michelle Pineda	None awarded

=== Men ===
==== International events ====
Competition	Event	Gold	Silver	Bronze
Olympics	Team	Japan	China	United States
Olympics	All-Around	(Japan) Shinnosuke Oka	(China) Zhang Boheng	(China) Xiao Ruoteng
Olympics	Floor Exercise	(Philippines) Carlos Yulo	(Israel) Artem Dolgopyat	(United Kingdom) Jake Jarman
Olympics	Pommel Horse	(Republic of Ireland) Rhys McClenaghan	(Kazakhstan) Nariman Kurbanov	(United States) Stephen Nedoroscik
Olympics	Rings	(China) Liu Yang	(China) Zou Jingyuan	(Greece) Eleftherios Petrounias
Olympics	Vault	(Philippines) Carlos Yulo	(Armenia) Artur Davtyan	(United Kingdom) Harry Hepworth
Olympics	Parallel Bars	(China) Zou Jingyuan	(Ukraine) Illia Kovtun	(Japan) Shinnosuke Oka
Olympics	Horizontal Bar	(Japan) Shinnosuke Oka	(Colombia) Ángel Barajas	(China) Zhang Boheng (Chinese Taipei) Tang Chia-hung

==== Regional championships ====
Competition	Event	Gold	Silver	Bronze
African	Team	Egypt	Morocco	Cameroon
African	All-Around	(Egypt) Omar Mohamed	(Egypt) Mohamed Afify	(South Africa) Luke James
African	Floor Exercise	(South Africa) Luke James	(Egypt) Omar Mohamed	(Morocco) Hamza Hossaini
African	Pommel Horse	(Egypt) Abdelrahman Abdelhaleem	(Egypt) Mohamed Afify	(Morocco) Taha Kabouri
African	Rings	(Egypt) Ali Zahran	(Egypt) Omar Mohamed	(Morocco) Hamza Hossaini
African	Vault	(South Africa) Luke James	(Egypt) Omar Mohamed	(Morocco) Hamza Hossaini
African	Parallel Bars	(Egypt) Mohamed Afify	(Egypt) Omar Mohamed	(Morocco) Hamza Hossaini
African	Horizontal Bar	(Egypt) Abdelrahman Abdelhaleem	(Egypt) Omar Mohamed	(South Africa) Luke James
Asian	Team	China	Uzbekistan	South Korea
Asian	All-Around	(Philippines) Carlos Yulo	(Kazakhstan) Milad Karimi	(Uzbekistan) Abdulla Azimov
Asian	Floor Exercise	(Philippines) Carlos Yulo	(Kazakhstan) Milad Karimi	(China) Yang Yanzhi
Asian	Pommel Horse	(Kazakhstan) Nariman Kurbanov	(Uzbekistan) Abdulla Azimov	(Jordan) Ahmad Abu Al-Soud
Asian	Rings	(China) Yin Dehang	(Vietnam) Nguyễn Văn Khánh Phong	(China) Yang Yanzhi
Asian	Vault	(Philippines) Carlos Yulo	(Uzbekistan) Abdulaziz Mirvaliev	(Malaysia) Muhammad Sharul Aimy
Asian	Parallel Bars	(Philippines) Carlos Yulo	(China) Yin Dehang	(Uzbekistan) Rasuljon Abdurakhimov
Asian	Horizontal Bar	(Kazakhstan) Milad Karimi	(China) Tian Hao	(China) Liao Jialei
European	Team	Ukraine	Great Britain	Italy
European	All-Around	(Cyprus) Marios Georgiou	(Ukraine) Oleg Verniaiev	(Italy) Yumin Abbadini
European	Floor Exercise	(United Kingdom) Luke Whitehouse	(Israel) Artem Dolgopyat	(Hungary) Krisztofer Mészáros
European	Pommel Horse	(Republic of Ireland) Rhys McClenaghan	(Netherlands) Loran de Munck	(Cyprus) Marios Georgiou
European	Rings	(Greece) Eleftherios Petrounias	(Azerbaijan) Nikita Simonov	(Turkey) Adem Asil
European	Vault	(United Kingdom) Jake Jarman	(Armenia) Artur Davtyan	(Ukraine) Nazar Chepurnyi
European	Parallel Bars	(Ukraine) Illia Kovtun	(Cyprus) Marios Georgiou	(Switzerland) Noe Seifert
European	Horizontal Bar	(Ukraine) Illia Kovtun	(Lithuania) Robert Tvorogal	(Cyprus) Marios Georgiou
Oceania	All-Around	(Australia) Jesse Moore	(Australia) Clay Mason-Stephens	(New Zealand) Ethan Dick
Pan American	Team	Brazil	Colombia	Argentina
Pan American	All-Around	(Brazil) Caio Souza	(Chile) Luciano Letelier	(Argentina) Santiago Mayol
Pan American	Floor Exercise	(Mexico) Alonso Pérez	(Colombia) Andrés Martínez	(Argentina) Julian Jato
Pan American	Pommel Horse	(Brazil) Diogo Soares	(Peru) Edward Alarcón	(Argentina) Luca Alfieri
Pan American	Rings	(Chile) Joaquín Álvarez	(Argentina) Daniel Villafañe	(Brazil) Caio Souza
Pan American	Vault	(Brazil) Caio Souza	(Colombia) Dilan Jiménez	(Chile) Josue Armijo
Pan American	Parallel Bars	(Colombia) Dilan Jiménez	(Brazil) Diogo Soares	(Venezuela) Adickxon Trejo
Pan American	Horizontal Bar	(Brazil) Diogo Soares	(Brazil) Caio Souza	(Mexico) Joseph Solís

== Season's best international scores ==
Note: Only the scores of senior gymnasts from international events have been included below. Only one score per gymnast is included.

=== Women ===
==== Individual all-around ====
Rank	Name	Country	Score	Event
1	Simone Biles	United States	59.566	Olympic Games QF
2	Rebeca Andrade	Brazil	57.966	Olympic Games TF
3	Kaylia Nemour	Algeria	56.900	RomGym Trophy AA
4	Sunisa Lee	United States	56.465	Olympic Games AA
5	Alice D'Amato	Italy	56.333	Olympic Games AA
6	Jordan Chiles	United States	56.065	Olympic Games QF
7	Manila Esposito	Italy	55.898	Olympic Games QF
8	Ellie Black	Canada	55.733	City of Jesolo Trophy QF
9	Qiu Qiyuan	China	54.998	Olympic Games QF
10	Asia D'Amato	Italy	54.900	City of Jesolo Trophy QF
11	Flávia Saraiva	Brazil	54.866	City of Jesolo Trophy QF
12	Jayla Hang	United States	54.800	Pacific Rim Championships AA
13	Alice Kinsella	Great Britain	54.732	European Championships TF
14	Rina Kishi	Japan	54.699	Olympic Games QF
15	Helen Kevric	Germany	54.598	Olympic Games AA
16	Ana Bărbosu	Romania	54.550	RomGym Trophy AA
17	Angela Andreoli	Italy	54.400	City of Jesolo Trophy QF
18	Dulcy Caylor	United States	54.133	City of Jesolo Trophy QF
19	Tiana Sumanasekera	United States	54.100	City of Jesolo Trophy QF
20	Hezly Rivera	United States	54.034	City of Jesolo Trophy QF

==== Vault ====
Rank	Name	Country	Score	Event
1	Simone Biles	United States	15.300	Olympic Games QF
2	Rebeca Andrade	Brazil	14.966	Olympic Games EF
3	Jade Carey	United States	14.466	Olympic Games EF
4	An Chang-ok	North Korea	14.233	Cairo World Cup EF
5	Jordan Chiles	United States	14.216	Olympic Games QF
6	Yeo Seo-jeong	South Korea	14.183	Olympic Games QF
7	Shallon Olsen	Canada	14.166	Olympic Games QF
8	Valentina Georgieva	Bulgaria	14.083	Varna World Challenge Cup EF
9	Ellie Black	Canada	14.000	Olympic Games QF
10	Coline Devillard	France	13.983	European Championships QF

==== Uneven bars ====
Rank	Name	Country	Score	Event
1	Kaylia Nemour	Algeria	15.700	Olympic Games EF
2	Qiu Qiyuan	China	15.500	Olympic Games EF
3	Becky Downie	Great Britain	14.933	Olympic Games TF
4	Sunisa Lee	United States	14.866	Olympic Games QF
5	Kate McDonald	Australia	14.850	DTB Pokal Team Challenge EF
6	Yang Fanyuwei	China	14.800	Antalya World Challenge Cup QF
6	Alice D'Amato	Italy	14.800	Olympic Games AA
8	Nina Derwael	Belgium	14.766	Olympic Games EF
9	Rebeca Andrade	Brazil	14.700	Antalya World Challenge Cup QF
10	Hu Jiafei	China	14.600	Cottbus World Cup QF
10	Helen Kevric	Germany	14.600	Olympic Games QF

==== Balance beam ====
Rank	Name	Country	Score	Event
1	Qiu Qiyuan	China	15.500	DTB Pokal Team Challenge EF
2	Zhou Yaqin	China	14.950	DTB Pokal Team Challenge TF
3	Kaylia Nemour	Algeria	14.733	RomGym Trophy EF
3	Simone Biles	United States	14.733	Olympic Games QF
5	Sunisa Lee	United States	14.600	Olympic Games TF
6	Rebeca Andrade	Brazil	14.500	Olympic Games QF
6	Flávia Saraiva	Brazil	14.500	City of Jesolo Trophy EF
8	Manila Esposito	Italy	14.400	European Championships EF
9	Alice D'Amato	Italy	14.366	Olympic Games EF
10	Ellie Black	Canada	14.300	Olympic Games TF
10	Zhang Qingying	China	14.300	Baku World Cup QF
10	Sun Xinyi	China	14.300	Antalya World Challenge Cup QF

==== Floor exercise ====
Rank	Name	Country	Score	Event
1	Simone Biles	United States	15.066	Olympic Games AA
2	Rebeca Andrade	Brazil	14.200	Olympic Games TF
3	Jordan Chiles	United States	13.966	Olympic Games TF
4	Mélanie de Jesus dos Santos	France	13.900	Antalya World Challenge Cup QF
4	Sabrina Voinea	Romania	13.900	Olympic Games TF
4	Tiana Sumanasekera	United States	13.900	City of Jesolo Trophy QF
7	Jade Barbosa	Brazil	13.833	Antalya World Challenge Cup EF
7	Manila Esposito	Italy	13.833	European Championships EF
9	Ana Bărbosu	Romania	13.750	RomGym Trophy AA
10	Zhou Yaqin	China	13.733	Cottbus World Cup EF

=== Men ===
==== Individual all-around ====
Rank	Name	Country	Score	Event
1	Zhang Boheng	China	88.597	Olympic Games QF
2	Shinnosuke Oka	Japan	86.865	Olympic Games QF
3	Xiao Ruoteng	China	86.364	Olympic Games AA
4	Illia Kovtun	Ukraine	86.165	Olympic Games AA
5	Joe Fraser	Great Britain	85.532	Olympic Games AA
6	Carlos Yulo	Philippines	85.298	Asian Championships AA
7	Daiki Hashimoto	Japan	85.064	Olympic Games QF
8	Jake Jarman	Great Britain	84.897	Olympic Games QF
9	Oleg Verniaiev	Ukraine	84.865	Olympic Games TF
10	Milad Karimi	Kazakhstan	84.632	Asian Championships AA
11	Yul Moldauer	United States	84.600	Pacific Rim Championships AA
12	Marios Georgiou	Cyprus	84.265	European Championships AA
13	Cameron Bock	United States	84.150	Pacific Rim Championships AA
14	Krisztofer Mészáros	Hungary	83.899	Olympic Games AA
15	Yumin Abbadini	Italy	83.765	European Championships AA
16	Adem Asil	Turkey	83.632	European Championships TF
17	Fred Richard	United States	83.498	Olympic Games QF
18	Matteo Giubellini	Switzerland	83.332	Olympic Games AA
19	Paul Juda	United States	82.865	Olympic Games QF
20	Néstor Abad	Spain	82.798	European Championships AA

==== Floor exercise ====
Rank	Name	Country	Score	Event
1	Carlos Yulo	Philippines	15.233	Asian Championships QF
2	Artem Dolgopyat	Israel	15.200	European Championships QF
3	Milad Karimi	Kazakhstan	15.000	Troyes Friendly AA
4	Jake Jarman	Great Britain	14.966	Olympic Games QF
5	Krisztofer Mészáros	Hungary	14.950	Varna World Challenge Cup QF
5	Lorenzo Casali	Italy	14.950	Troyes Friendly AA
7	Yahor Sharamkou	Authorised Neutral Athletes	14.933	Baku World Cup EF
8	Harry Hepworth	Great Britain	14.900	Cottbus World Cup EF
9	Luke Whitehouse	Great Britain	14.866	European Championships EF
10	Nicola Bartolini	Italy	14.850	Troyes Friendly AA

==== Pommel horse ====
Rank	Name	Country	Score	Event
1	Nariman Kurbanov	Kazakhstan	15.666	Asian Championships QF
2	Lee Chih-kai	Chinese Taipei	15.533	Baku World Cup QF
2	Rhys McClenaghan	Ireland	15.533	Olympic Games EF
4	Ahmad Abu Al-Soud	Jordan	15.500	Doha World Cup EF
5	Stephen Nedoroscik	United States	15.400	Baku World Cup EF
6	Shiao Yu-jan	Chinese Taipei	15.300	Baku World Cup EF
6	Hur Woong	South Korea	15.300	Cottbus World Cup EF
8	Max Whitlock	Great Britain	15.266	Olympic Games TF
9	Oleg Verniaiev	Ukraine	15.166	European Championships QF
10	Edoardo de Rosa	Italy	15.133	Szombathely World Challenge Cup EF

==== Rings ====
Rank	Name	Country	Score	Event
1	Liu Yang	China	15.500	Olympic Games TF
2	Lan Xingyu	China	15.400	DTB Pokal Team Challenge EF
3	Zou Jingyuan	China	15.300	Olympic Games QF
4	Eleftherios Petrounias	Greece	15.100	Olympic Games EF
5	You Hao	China	15.033	Baku World Cup QF
6	Samir Aït Saïd	France	15.000	Olympic Games EF
7	Adem Asil	Turkey	14.966	Olympic Games EF
8	Vinzenz Höck	Austria	14.900	European Championships QF
8	Nikita Simonov	Azerbaijan	14.900	European Championships EF
8	Glen Cuyle	Belgium	14.900	Olympic Games QF

==== Vault ====
Rank	Name	Country	Score	Event
1	Artur Davtyan	Armenia	15.166	Doha World Cup EF
1	Carlos Yulo	Philippines	15.166	Olympic Games EF
3	Harry Hepworth	Great Britain	14.949	Olympic Games EF
4	Jake Jarman	Great Britain	14.933	Olympic Games EF
5	Nazar Chepurnyi	Ukraine	14.930	Cairo World Cup QF
6	Shek Wai-hung	Hong Kong	14.916	Baku World Cup QF
7	Aurel Benović	Croatia	14.900	Olympic Games EF
7	Mahdi Olfati	Iran	14.900	Cottbus World Cup EF
9	Chen Yilu	China	14.850	Cottbus World Cup EF
10	Igor Radivilov	Ukraine	14.833	European Championships QF

==== Parallel bars ====
Rank	Name	Country	Score	Event
1	Zou Jingyuan	China	16.200	Olympic Games QF
2	Illia Kovtun	Ukraine	15.633	European Championships EF
3	Curran Phillips	United States	15.566	DTB Pokal Team Challenge EF
4	Zhang Boheng	China	15.333	Olympic Games QF
5	Shinnosuke Oka	Japan	15.300	Olympic Games QF
6	Oleg Verniaiev	Ukraine	15.266	Olympic Games QF
7	Carlos Yulo	Philippines	15.200	Doha World Cup EF
8	Lukas Dauser	Germany	15.166	Olympic Games QF
9	Cameron-Lie Bernard	France	15.150	Varna World Challenge Cup QF
10	Ferhat Arıcan	Turkey	15.100	Olympic Games EF
10	Jossimar Calvo	Colombia	15.100	Cairo World Cup EF
10	Nazar Chepurnyi	Ukraine	15.100	Varna World Challenge Cup QF

==== Horizontal bar ====
Rank	Name	Country	Score	Event
1	Tang Chia-hung	Chinese Taipei	15.400	Koper World Challenge Cup EF
2	Zhang Boheng	China	15.133	Olympic Games QF
3	Carlo Macchini	Italy	14.950	Koper World Challenge Cup QF
3	Tin Srbić	Croatia	14.950	Koper World Challenge Cup EF
5	Fred Richard	United States	14.833	Olympic Games TF
6	Takaaki Sugino	Japan	14.733	Olympic Games QF
7	Robert Tvorogal	Lithuania	14.700	Doha World Cup EF
8	Tian Hao	China	14.633	Asian Championships QF
9	Illia Kovtun	Ukraine	14.600	European Championships QF
10	Daiki Hashimoto	Japan	14.566	Olympic Games TF
