= Gymnastics at the 2024 Summer Olympics – Women's vault =

Women's vault at the Games of the XXXIII Olympiad
- Olympic artistic gymnastics
- Venue: Accor Arena
- Dates: 28 July 2024 (qualifying); 3 August 2024 (final)
- Competitors: 8 from 6 nations
- Winning score: 15.300

Medalists
1st place, gold medalist(s)		Simone Biles	United States
2nd place, silver medalist(s)		Rebeca Andrade	Brazil
3rd place, bronze medalist(s)		Jade Carey	United States

The women's vault event at the 2024 Summer Olympics was held on 28 July and 3 August 2024 at the Accor Arena (referred to as the Bercy Arena due to IOC sponsorship rules). Unlike the other apparatus events, vault requires gymnasts to perform two exercises in order for results to count towards the vault final; most of the gymnasts perform only one (if they are participating in team or individual all-around) or none (if they are only participating in other apparatus). 19 gymnasts from 14 nations (of the 95 total gymnasts) competed two vaults in the qualifying round.

== Background ==
This was the 20th appearance of the event, after making its debut at the 1952 Summer Olympics. The previous two champions Simone Biles (2016) and Rebeca Andrade (2020) both qualified for the event final.

== Qualification ==
A National Olympic Committee (NOC) could enter up to 5 qualified gymnasts. A total of 95 quota places are allocated to women's artistic gymnastics.

The 12 teams that qualified were able to send 5 gymnasts in the team competition, for a total of 60 of the 95 quota places. The top three teams at the 2022 World Artistic Gymnastics Championships (the United States, Great Britain, and Canada) and the top nine teams (excluding those already qualified) at the 2023 World Artistic Gymnastics Championships (China, Brazil, Italy, the Netherlands, France, Japan, Australia, Romania, and South Korea) earned team qualification places.

The remaining 35 quota places are awarded individually. Each gymnast can only earn one place. These places are filled through various criteria based on the 2023 World Championships, the 2024 FIG Artistic Gymnastics World Cup series, continental championships, a reallocation guarantee and a Tripartite Commission invitation.

Each of the 95 qualified gymnasts are eligible for the vault competition, but due to the requirement that the gymnast perform two vault exercises in the qualifying round (rather than the one needed to count for team and individual all-around events), many gymnasts do not attempt to qualify for the vault final.

== Competition format ==
The top 8 qualifiers in the qualification phase (limit two per NOC) advanced to the apparatus final. For the vault, only gymnasts who performed two exercises on the vault were considered for the final; the average score of the two exercises was counted. The finalists again performed two vaults. Qualification scores were then ignored, with only final round scores (average of the two exercises) counting.

== Schedule ==
Date	Time	Round	Subdivision
28 July	09:30	Qualification	Subdivision 1
28 July	11:40	Qualification	Subdivision 2
28 July	14:50	Qualification	Subdivision 3
28 July	18:00	Qualification	Subdivision 4
28 July	21:10	Qualification	Subdivision 5
3 August	16:20	Final	–
All times are Central European Summer Time (UTC+02:00)

== Results ==
=== Qualifying ===
The gymnasts who ranked in the top eight qualified for the final round. In a case where more than two gymnasts from the same NOC were in the top eight, the last ranked among them would not qualify to final round. The next-best ranked gymnast would qualify instead.

Rank	Gymnast	Vault 1				Vault 2				Total	Qual.
Rank	Gymnast	D Score	E Score	Pen.	Score 1	D Score	E Score	Pen.	Score 2	Total	Qual.
1	Simone Biles (USA)	6.4	9.400		15.800	5.6	9.200		14.800	15.300	Q
2	Rebeca Andrade (BRA)	5.6	9.400	0.100	14.900	5.0	9.466		14.466	14.683	Q
3	Jade Carey (USA)	5.6	9.166	0.100	14.666	5.0	9.200		14.200	14.433	Q
4	Jordan Chiles (USA)	5.0	9.333		14.333	4.8	9.300		14.100	14.216	–
5	Yeo Seo-jeong (KOR)	5.4	9.000		14.400	5.0	8.966		13.966	14.183	Q
6	An Chang-ok (PRK)	5.0	9.066		14.066	5.6	8.700		14.300	14.183	Q
7	Shallon Olsen (CAN)	5.6	8.833		14.433	5.0	8.900		13.900	14.166	Q
8	Ellie Black (CAN)	5.0	9.100		14.100	4.8	9.100		13.900	14.000	Q
9	Valentina Georgieva (BUL)	5.0	9.166		14.166	4.8	9.033		13.833	13.999	Q
10	Alexa Moreno (MEX)	5.4	8.766		14.166	5.2	8.533		13.733	13.949	R1
11	Ming van Eijken (FRA)	5.4	8.833		14.233	4.4	8.933		13.333	13.783	R2
12	Csenge Bácskay (HUN)	5.0	8.900		13.900	4.8	8.833		13.633	13.766	R3

Reserves

The reserves for the vault event final were:

1. Alexa Moreno (MEX)
2. Ming van Eijken (FRA)
3. Csenge Bácskay (HUN)

Only two gymnasts from each country may advance to the vault final. Gymnasts who did not qualify for the final because of the quota, but had high enough scores to do so were:

- Jordan Chiles (USA)

=== Final ===
Rank	Gymnast	Vault 1				Vault 2				Total
Rank	Gymnast	D Score	E Score	Pen.	Score 1	D Score	E Score	Pen.	Score 2	Total
1st place, gold medalist(s)	Simone Biles (USA)	6.4	9.400	0.100	15.700	5.6	9.300		14.900	15.300
2nd place, silver medalist(s)	Rebeca Andrade (BRA)	5.6	9.500		15.100	5.4	9.433		14.833	14.966
3rd place, bronze medalist(s)	Jade Carey (USA)	5.6	9.133		14.733	5.0	9.200		14.200	14.466
4	An Chang-ok (PRK)	5.0	9.066		14.066	5.6	8.766		14.366	14.216
5	Valentina Georgieva (BUL)	5.0	9.100		14.100	4.8	9.066		13.866	13.983
6	Ellie Black (CAN)	5.0	9.100		14.100	4.8	8.966		13.766	13.933
7	Yeo Seo-jeong (KOR)	5.4	8.766		14.166	5.0	7.666		12.666	13.416
8	Shallon Olsen (CAN)	5.6	8.500		14.100	5.0	7.633		12.633	13.366
