= Erika Pinxten =

Belgian artistic gymnast

- Born: 24 February 2007 (age 19) Hasselt, Belgium

Gymnastics career
- Discipline: Women's artistic gymnastics
- Country represented: Belgium
- Gym: Topsportschool Gent
- Head coach: Marjorie Heuls
Medal record
Representing Belgium
Women's artistic gymnastics
FIG World Cup
Event	1st	2nd	3rd
World Cup	0	1	2

Erika Pinxten (born 24 February 2007) is a Belgian artistic gymnast.

She currently trains at Topsportcentrum in Ghent, Belgium, with her coach Marjorie Heuls.

== Early life ==
Erika Pinxten began gymnastics at the gym Sta Paraat Hasselt.

She speaks Dutch and English.

== Youth and junior career ==
=== 2017 ===
Pinxten's first competition was in 2017 at the Wase Gymcup in Melsele, Belgium, at the Espoir (youth) level. She finished 32nd in the all-around event.

=== 2019 ===
Pinxten continued to compete at the Espoir level in 2019. At the Belgian championships, she won gold in the all-around, gold on the balance beam, silver on uneven bars, and silver in the floor exercise. At the Flanders International Team (FIT) challenge, she won bronze on uneven bars.

=== 2021 ===
In 2021, Erika Pinxten competed for the first time at the junior level. She competed at the FIT challenge where she placed 18th in the all-around event. She competed at the Elite Gym Massilia in Marseille, France, where she placed 26th in the all-around as she only competed uneven bars and balance beam.

=== 2022 ===
Pinxten competed at the DTB Pokal Team Challenge in Stuttgart, Germany, placing 15th in the all-around, 5th on uneven bars, and 4th on floor exercise. She competed at the City of Jesolo Trophy, in Jesolo, Italy, where she placed 18th in the all-around, and 7th on balance beam. She competed again at the Belgian championships, winning bronze on vault, bronze, on floor exercise, and gold on balance beam. She did compete uneven bars. She competed at Tournoi International in Combs-la-ville, France, winning bronze on the balance beam, and silver in the team event with her teammates Chloe Baert, and Yelena Devreker.

Her last competition as a junior was at the Top Gym Tournament in Charleroi, Belgium, where she won bronze on uneven bars, gold on balance beam, and bronze in the team event with her teammates Marie de Smedt, Louise Dupont, and Zofia Kopczynski.

== Senior career ==
=== 2023 ===
In 2023, Erika Pinxten began competing as a senior with her first competition being the DTB Pokal Team Challenge, where she placed 39th in the all-around and won silver in the team event with Maellyse Brassart, Fien Enghels, Aberdeen O'Driscoll, and Jutta Verkest.

She competed at the Cairo World Cup, winning bronze on the uneven bars and on the balance beam.

At the Belgian Championships, she won gold in the all-around and on the balance beam, silver on vault and uneven bars, and bronze on the floor exercise.

Pinxten competed at the World Championships in Antwerp where she finished as first reserve with a score of 49.832 in the all-around event just behind Rifda Irfanaluthfi of Indonesia. With the absence of Lisa Vaelen and Nina Derwael, and with Maellyse Brassart restricted to two events due to injury, Belgium failed to qualify a team spot for the 2024 Paris Olympics.

=== 2024 ===
In 2024, Pinxten, along with other female Belgian gymnasts, competed through the World Cup series to attempt qualification for the 2024 Paris Olympics.

She competed at the Cairo World Cup where she won silver on balance beam just behind Nina Derwael, and placed 5th in the all-around. She then competed at the Cottbus World Cup where she placed 7th in the all-around. However, she withdrew from the Baku World Cup due to back problems. Pinxten did not attend the Doha World Cup, with the Belgian gymnastics federation Gymfed citing the decision to focus on European championships. As a result, Ting Hua-tien of Chinese Taipei qualified through balance beam to obtain an Olympic berth instead.

At the 2024 European championships in Rimini, Italy, Pinxten did not qualify for event finals and placed 30th in the all-around. Fellow Belgian Maellyse Brassart placed 10th and qualified for the Olympics, having the highest all-around score of any non-qualified gymnast.

Pinxten competed at the Hagueneau Friendly in Haguenau, France, with her best scores placing 6th in the all-around and on uneven bars.

=== 2025 ===
Pinxten only competed in one competition in 2025. At the Rotterdam Friendly, she won silver on balance beam and bronze in the team event.

== Competitive history ==
Competitive history of Erika Pinxten at the espoir level

Year	Event	Team	AA	VT	UB	BB	FX
2017	Wase Gymcup		32				
2019	Belgian Championships		1st place, gold medalist(s)	4	2nd place, silver medalist(s)	1st place, gold medalist(s)	2nd place, silver medalist(s)
2019	FIT Challenge		10	20	3rd place, bronze medalist(s)	5	15

Competitive history of Erika Pinxten at the junior level

Year	Event	Team	AA	VT	UB	BB	FX
2021	FIT Challenge	5	18				
2021	Elite Gym Massalia	6	26				
2022	DTB Pokal Team Challenge	7	15		5		4
2022	City of Jesolo Trophy	7	18			7	
2022	Belgian Championships		9	3rd place, bronze medalist(s)		1st place, gold medalist(s)	3rd place, bronze medalist(s)
2022	Tournoi International	2nd place, silver medalist(s)	13			3rd place, bronze medalist(s)	
2022	Top Gym Tournament	3rd place, bronze medalist(s)	11		3rd place, bronze medalist(s)	1st place, gold medalist(s)	

Competitive history of Erika Pinxten at the senior level

Year	Event	Team	AA	VT	UB	BB	FX
2023	DTB Pokal Team Challenge	2nd place, silver medalist(s)	39				
2023	Cairo World Cup				3rd place, bronze medalist(s)	3rd place, bronze medalist(s)	
2023	Belgian Championships		1st place, gold medalist(s)	2nd place, silver medalist(s)	2nd place, silver medalist(s)	1st place, gold medalist(s)	3rd place, bronze medalist(s)
2023	World Championships						
2024	Cairo World Cup					2nd place, silver medalist(s)	5
2024	Cottbus World Cup					7	
2024	European Championships		30				
2024	Haguenau Friendly		6	10	6	8	9
2025	Rotterdam Friendly	3rd place, bronze medalist(s)	11			2nd place, silver medalist(s)	4
