= Charlize Mörz =

Austrian artistic gymnast (born 2005)

- Alternative name: Charlize Moerz
- Nickname: Charlie
- Born: 10 October 2005 (age 21) Eisenstadt, Austria

Gymnastics career
- Discipline: Women's artistic gymnastics
- Country represented: Austria
- Club: Kunstturnen Mattersburg
- Gym: Linz Bundesstützpunkt
- Head coach: Gabi Frehse
Medal record
Representing Austria
FIG World Cup
Event	1st	2nd	3rd
Apparatus World Cup	1	0	2
World Challenge Cup	1	1	0
Total	2	1	2

Charlize Mörz (born 10 October 2005) is an Austrian artistic gymnast. At the 2024 Baku World Cup, she became the first Austrian female gymnast to win a gold medal on the FIG World Cup series. She represented Austria at the 2024 Summer Olympics. She has represented her country at three World Championships (2021, 2022 and 2023). At the junior level, she is the 2020 Austrian all-around champion, and she is a two-time Austrian senior all-around silver medalist (2022, 2023). She is a two-time national champion on the floor exercise.

== Early life ==
Mörz was born in Eisenstadt and has two sisters—Alissa (b. 2002) and Collien (b. 2006)—who also compete in elite gymnastics. They also have a younger brother named Nicholas. Their father is former professional footballer Michael Mörz who played for the Austrian national football team, and their mother, Nina, is a primary school teacher. She began training in artistic gymnastics at the age of four. She won the all-around title at the 2016 Austrian Youth Championships with cuts on her face because of a bad fall in training.

== Junior career ==
Mörz made her international debut at the 2017 Elek Matolay Memorial where she finished seventh in the all-around and sixth in the balance beam final. Then at the 2017 Austrian Championships, she finished sixth in the all-around. In the event finals, she placed fifth on the vault and floor exercise and fourth on the uneven bars. At the 2018 Zelena Jama Open, Mörz won the silver medal in the all-around behind Czech gymnast Nela Kaplanova. She once again placed sixth in the all-around at the Austrian Championships. In the event finals, she won a silver medal on the balance beam and a bronze medal on the floor exercise. She also placed fourth in the vault final.

Mörz began the 2019 season at the Elek Matolay Memorial where she finished 20th in the all-around. She then placed seventh in the all-around at the Pre-Olympic Youth Cup held in Essen, Germany. She placed eighth in the all-around at the Züri-Oberland Cup. She represented Austria at the 2019 European Youth Olympic Festival and helped the team place 20th. At the Austrian Championships, she finished fourth in the all-around. Then in the event finals, she won silver medals on the vault and floor exercise and a bronze medal on the uneven bars.

Mörz won the all-around title at the 2020 Austrian Championships. She also won the vault title and won the bronze medal on the uneven bars, and she placed fifth on the floor exercise. This was her only competition in 2020.

== Senior career ==
=== 2021 ===
Mörz became age-eligible for senior competitions in 2021. She made her senior debut at the Austrian Championships, placing ninth in the all-around. Then in the event finals, she won bronze medals on both the vault and floor exercise. She then made her senior international debut at the Osijek World Challenge Cup and placed eighth in the vault final. She was selected for the 2021 World Championships team to make her World Championships debut. She competed on the vault, balance beam, and floor exercise, but she did not advance into any finals.

=== 2022 ===
Mörz began the season at the Austrian Championships and won the silver medal in the all-around behind Carina Kröll. She won the event title on floor exercise, and she placed fourth on both the vault and balance beam. She then helped Austria place fifth at the Austrian Team Challenge. She competed at the European Championships. There, she became the first gymnast to perform a hop with a full turn in passé position. However, the element was not deemed difficult enough for it to be named after Mörz, but the skill is now included in the Code of Points. She helped the Austrian team place 11th in the qualification round. She then competed with the Austrian team that placed 19th at the World Championships.

=== 2023 ===
Mörz began the season at the Magglingen Friendly and placed seventh in the all-around. She then helped the Austrian team place 12th in the qualification round at the European Championships. At the Cairo World Cup, she placed sixth in the floor exercise final. Then at the Austrian Championships, she won the silver medal in the all-around, and she won gold on floor exercise, silver on vault, and bronze on balance beam. She then helped Austria win the team competition at the Linz Family, and she placed second in the all-around. She qualified for the floor exercise final at the Paris World Challenge Cup, placing eighth. Then at the World Championships in Antwerp, she helped Austria finish 20th in the qualification round.

=== 2024 ===
Mörz began the year at the Cairo World Cup, the first event in the 2024 FIG World Cup series. She advanced to the floor exercise final in first place with a score of 13.200. This marked the first time an Austrian gymnast qualified for an FIG World Cup final in first place. In the final, she placed fourth with a score of 12.633. This was the same score as bronze medallist Laura Casabuena of Spain, but Mörz was demoted due to tie break procedures. She won 20 points for Olympic qualification. A week later, Mörz attended the second FIG World Cup event in Cottbus, Germany. She placed third in the floor exercise final behind China's Zhou Yaqin and Xinyi Chen, scoring 13.100. As the highest-placing eligible gymnast, she earned 30 points towards Olympic qualification.

Mörz won the gold medal on the floor exercise at the Baku World Cup with a score of 13.566. This marked the first time an Austrian female gymnast won a gold medal on the FIG World Cup series. She won another 30 points towards Olympic qualification and mathematically secured an Olympic berth. Despite already securing an Olympic berth, she still competed at the Doha World Cup and finished seventh on the floor exercise. She was the overall 2024 FIG World Cup series winner on floor exercise.

Mörz competed at the European Championships and was the first reserve for the floor exercise event final.

At the 2024 Summer Olympics, Mörz finished 70th on both the uneven bars and floor exercise, 75th on balance beam, and placed 57th for the all around.

== Competitive history ==
Competitive history of Charlize Mörz at the junior level
Year	Event	Team	AA	VT	UB	BB	FX
2017	Elek Matolay Memorial		7			6	
2017	Austrian Championships		6	5	4		5
2018	Zelena Jama Open		2nd place, silver medalist(s)				
2018	Austrian Championships		6	4		2nd place, silver medalist(s)	3rd place, bronze medalist(s)
2019	Elek Matolay Memorial		20				
2019	Pre-Olympic Youth Cup		7				
2019	Züri-Oberland Cup		8				
2019	European Youth Olympic Festival	20					
2019	Austrian Championships		4	2nd place, silver medalist(s)	3rd place, bronze medalist(s)		2nd place, silver medalist(s)
2020	Austrian Championships		1st place, gold medalist(s)	1st place, gold medalist(s)	3rd place, bronze medalist(s)		5

Competitive history of Charlize Mörz at the senior level
Year	Event	Team	AA	VT	UB	BB	FX
2021	Austrian Championships		9	3rd place, bronze medalist(s)			3rd place, bronze medalist(s)
2021	Osijek World Challenge Cup			8			
2022	Austrian Championships		2nd place, silver medalist(s)	4		4	1st place, gold medalist(s)
2022	Austrian Team Challenge	5					
2022	European Championships	11					
2022	World Championships	19					
2023	Magglingen Friendly		7				
2023	European Championships	12					
2023	Cairo World Cup						6
2023	Austrian Championships		2nd place, silver medalist(s)	2nd place, silver medalist(s)		3rd place, bronze medalist(s)	1st place, gold medalist(s)
2023	Linz Family	1st place, gold medalist(s)	2nd place, silver medalist(s)				
2023	Paris World Challenge Cup						8
2023	World Championships	20					
2024	Cairo World Cup						4
2024	Cottbus World Cup						3rd place, bronze medalist(s)
2024	Baku World Cup						1st place, gold medalist(s)
2024	Doha World Cup						7
2024	European Championships	13					R1
2024	Olympic Games		57				
2025	Varna World Challenge Cup						2nd place, silver medalist(s)
2025	Szombathely World Challenge Cup			1st place, gold medalist(s)			
2025	World Championships			7			
2026	Osijek World Cup			3rd place, bronze medalist(s)			7
2026	European Championships	19		6			
