= Gymnastics at the 2024 Summer Olympics – Qualification =

Qualifying phase for gymnastics

This article describes the qualifying phase for gymnastics at the 2024 Summer Olympics. A total of 318 gymnasts (192 in artistic, 94 in rhythmic and 32 in trampoline) would qualify.

The qualification pathway for the 2024 Summer Olympics was significantly simplified and modified from those in 2020. In the artistic team event, a maximum of five gymnasts would be eligible to participate as opposed to the four per team and two individuals who competed in Tokyo 2020. Three teams who finish on the podium qualify for the Olympics through the 2022 World Artistic Gymnastics Championships in Liverpool with a large proportion of quota places distributed at the same meet in Antwerp, Belgium by the following year. The 2024 World Cup series will also hand the gymnasts an opportunity to earn more spots in separate apparatus events.

In rhythmic gymnastics, the 2022 World Championships, held from 14 to 18 September in Sofia, Bulgaria, witnessed individual and group all-around medalists book their tickets to Paris. Most quota places were allocated at the same meet in Valencia, Spain by the following year with fourteen individual gymnasts and five nations across all continents vying for qualification.

Up to half of the trampoline qualifying slots will be awarded to the highest-ranked gymnasts at the 2023 World Championships in Birmingham with the majority coming from the 2023–2024 World Cup series. Across all gymnastics disciplines, the remaining places will be offered to the gymnasts vying for qualification at their respective continental meets.

== Qualification summary ==
Nation	Artistic		Rhythmic		Trampoline		Total
Nation	Men	Women	Individual	Group	Men	Women	Total
Algeria		1					1
Armenia	2						2
Australia	1	5	1	Yes			12
Austria		1			1		2
Azerbaijan			1	Yes		1	7
Belgium	3	2					5
Brazil	2	5	1	Yes	1	1	15
Bulgaria	1	1	2	Yes			9
Canada	5	5				1	11
China	5	5	1	Yes	2	2	20
Chinese Taipei	1	1					2
Colombia	1	1			1		3
Croatia	2						2
Cyprus	1		1				2
Czech Republic		1					1
Dominican Republic	1						1
Egypt	1	1	1	Yes	1	1	10
France	1	5	1	Yes	1	1	14
Georgia						1	1
Germany	5	3	2	Yes	1		16
Great Britain	5	5			1	2	13
Greece	1						1
Haiti		1					1
Hungary	1	3	1				5
Hong Kong	1						1
Indonesia		1					1
Individual Neutral Athletes					1	2	3
Iran	1						1
Ireland	1						1
Israel	1	1	1	Yes			8
Italy	5	5	2	Yes			17
Japan	5	5			1	1	12
Jordan	1						1
Kazakhstan	2		1		1		4
Laos			1				1
Lithuania	1						1
Mexico		3		Yes			8
Netherlands	5	5					10
New Zealand		1			1	1	3
North Korea		1					1
Panama		1					1
Philippines	1	3					4
Portugal		1			1		2
Romania	1	5	1				7
Slovenia		1	1				2
South Africa		1					1
South Korea	3	5					8
Spain	5	3	2	Yes	1	1	17
Switzerland	5	1					6
Syria	1						1
Turkey	5						5
Ukraine	5	1	1	Yes			12
United States	5	5	1		1	1	13
Uzbekistan	3		1	Yes			9
Total: 54 NOCs	96	95	24	70	16	16	317

== Timeline ==
Artistic Gymnastics
Event	Date	Location
2022 World Artistic Gymnastics Championships	October 29 – November 6, 2022	(United Kingdom) Liverpool
2023 World Artistic Gymnastics Championships	October 1–8, 2023	(Belgium) Antwerp
2024 Apparatus World Cup Series	February 15 – April 20, 2024	Various
2024 Continental Championships: 2023 Pan American Games; 2024 European Championships (MAG, WAG); 2024 African Championships; 2024 Asian Championships (MAG, WAG); 2024 Oceania Championships	October 21–25, 2023; April 24 – May 5, 2024; May 3–6, 2024; May 16–26, 2024; May 25–26, 2024	(Chile) Santiago (Italy) Rimini (Morocco) Marrakesh (Uzbekistan) Tashkent (New Zealand) Auckland
Rhythmic Gymnastics
Event	Date	Location
2022 Rhythmic Gymnastics World Championships	September 14–18, 2022	(Bulgaria) Sofia
2023 Rhythmic Gymnastics World Championships	August 23–27, 2023	(Spain) Valencia
2024 Continental Championships: 2023 Pan American Games; 2024 African Championships; 2024 Asian Championships; 2024 European Championships; 2024 Oceania Championships	November 1–4, 2023; April 25–26, 2024; May 2–4, 2024; May 22–26, 2024; May 22–26, 2024	(Chile) Santiago (Rwanda) Kigali (Uzbekistan) Tashkent (Hungary) Budapest (Hungary) Budapest
Trampoline
Event	Date	Location
2023 Trampoline Gymnastics World Championships	November 9–12, 2023	(United Kingdom) Birmingham
2023–24 Trampoline World Cup series	February 2023 – April 2024 (5 competitions)	Various
2024 Continental Championships: 2024 African Championships	May 10–11, 2024	(Tunisia) Bizerte

== Artistic ==
=== Men's ===
==== Teams ====
Event	Standard	Qualified national team
Teams of five
2022 World Artistic Gymnastics Championships	Team places 1–3	China; Japan; Great Britain
2023 World Artistic Gymnastics Championships	Team places 1–9 (among non-qualified teams)	United States; Canada; Germany; Italy; Switzerland; Spain; Turkey; Netherlands; Ukraine
Total		60 (12 teams of 5)

==== Individuals ====
Event	Standard	Qualified gymnast
2023 World Artistic Gymnastics Championships (Note: Athletes from NOCs with a qualified team are not eligible.) (1 quota per NOC)	Team places 10–12 (among non-qualified teams)	Brazil; South Korea; Belgium
2023 World Artistic Gymnastics Championships (1 quota per NOC)	All-around	Milad Karimi (KAZ); Artem Dolgopyat (ISR); Artur Davtyan (ARM); Krisztofer Mészáros (HUN); Lee Jun-ho (KOR); Diogo Soares (BRA); Luka van den Keybus (BEL); Andrei Muntean (ROU)
2023 World Artistic Gymnastics Championships (Note: Athletes from NOCs with a qualified team, or who have secured a place via the all-around are not eligible.) (max. 3 quotas per NOC across all apparatus)	Floor	Carlos Yulo (PHI)
2023 World Artistic Gymnastics Championships (max. 3 quotas per NOC across all apparatus)	Pommel horse	Rhys McClenaghan (IRL)
2023 World Artistic Gymnastics Championships (max. 3 quotas per NOC across all apparatus)	Rings	Eleftherios Petrounias (GRE)
2023 World Artistic Gymnastics Championships (max. 3 quotas per NOC across all apparatus)	Vault	Kevin Penev (BUL)
2023 World Artistic Gymnastics Championships (max. 3 quotas per NOC across all apparatus)	Parallel bars	Noah Kuavita (BEL)
2023 World Artistic Gymnastics Championships (max. 3 quotas per NOC across all apparatus)	Horizontal bar	Tin Srbić (CRO)
2024 FIG Artistic Gymnastics World Cup series (1 quota per NOC across all apparatus)	Floor	Ryu Sung-hyun (KOR); Aurel Benović (CRO)
2024 FIG Artistic Gymnastics World Cup series (1 quota per NOC across all apparatus)	Pommel horse	Ahmad Abu Al-Soud (JOR); Nariman Kurbanov (KAZ)
2024 FIG Artistic Gymnastics World Cup series (1 quota per NOC across all apparatus)	Rings	Vahagn Davtyan (ARM); Samir Aït Saïd (FRA)
2024 FIG Artistic Gymnastics World Cup series (1 quota per NOC across all apparatus)	Vault	Shek Wai Hung (HKG); Mahdi Olfati (IRI)
2024 FIG Artistic Gymnastics World Cup series (1 quota per NOC across all apparatus)	Parallel bars	Ángel Barajas (COL); Rasuljon Abdurakhimov (UZB)
2024 FIG Artistic Gymnastics World Cup series (1 quota per NOC across all apparatus)	Horizontal bar	Tang Chia-hung (TPE); Robert Tvorogal (LTU)
2024 Continental Championships (1 quota per NOC; all-around qualification)	Africa	Omar Mohamed (EGY)
2024 Continental Championships (1 quota per NOC; all-around qualification)	Asia	Abdulla Azimov (UZB)
2024 Continental Championships (1 quota per NOC; all-around qualification)	Americas	Audrys Nin Reyes (DOM)
2024 Continental Championships (1 quota per NOC; all-around qualification)	Europe	Marios Georgiou (CYP)
2024 Continental Championships (1 quota per NOC; all-around qualification)	Oceania	Jesse Moore (AUS)
Reserved places	Host nation	Host nation qualified above
Reserved places	Reallocation	Khabibullo Ergashev (UZB)
Reserved places	Tripartite invitation	Lais Najjar (SYR)
Total		36

=== Women's ===
==== Teams ====
Event	Standard	Qualified national team
Teams of five
2022 World Artistic Gymnastics Championships	Team places 1–3	United States; Great Britain; Canada
2023 World Artistic Gymnastics Championships	Team places 1–9 (among non-qualified teams)	China; Brazil; Italy; Netherlands; France; Japan; Australia; Romania; South Korea
Total		60 (12 teams of 5)

==== Individuals ====
Event	Standard	Qualified gymnast
2023 World Artistic Gymnastics Championships (1 quota per NOC)	Team places 10–12 (among non-qualified teams)	Germany; Mexico; Hungary
2023 World Artistic Gymnastics Championships (1 quota per NOC)	All-around	Kaylia Nemour (ALG); Pauline Schäfer (GER); Alexa Moreno (MEX); Ana Filipa Martins (POR); Aleah Finnegan (PHI); Bettina Lili Czifra (HUN); Alba Petisco (ESP); Anna Lashchevska (UKR); Lena Bickel (SUI); Hillary Heron (PAN); Caitlin Rooskrantz (RSA); Soňa Artamonová (CZE); Lihie Raz (ISR); Lucija Hribar (SLO)
2023 World Artistic Gymnastics Championships (max. 3 quotas per NOC across all apparatus)	Vault	Csenge Bácskay (HUN)
2023 World Artistic Gymnastics Championships (max. 3 quotas per NOC across all apparatus)	Uneven Bars	Ahtziri Sandoval (MEX)
2023 World Artistic Gymnastics Championships (max. 3 quotas per NOC across all apparatus)	Balance beam	Ana Pérez (ESP)
2023 World Artistic Gymnastics Championships (max. 3 quotas per NOC across all apparatus)	Floor	Sarah Voss (GER)
2024 FIG Artistic Gymnastics World Cup series (1 quota per NOC per apparatus)	Vault	An Chang-ok (PRK); Valentina Georgieva (BUL)
2024 FIG Artistic Gymnastics World Cup series (1 quota per NOC per apparatus)	Uneven Bars	Georgia-Rose Brown (NZL); Levi Ruivivar (PHI)
2024 FIG Artistic Gymnastics World Cup series (1 quota per NOC per apparatus)	Balance beam	Nina Derwael (BEL); Ting Hua-tien (TPE)
2024 FIG Artistic Gymnastics World Cup series (1 quota per NOC per apparatus)	Floor	Charlize Mörz (AUT); Laura Casabuena (ESP)
2024 Continental Championships (1 quota per NOC; all-around qualification)	Africa	Jana Mahmoud (EGY)
2024 Continental Championships (1 quota per NOC; all-around qualification)	Asia	Emma Malabuyo (PHI)
2024 Continental Championships (1 quota per NOC; all-around qualification)	Americas	Luisa Blanco (COL)
2024 Continental Championships (1 quota per NOC; all-around qualification)	Europe	Maellyse Brassart (BEL)
2024 Continental Championships (1 quota per NOC; all-around qualification)	Oceania	~~Isabella Brett (NZL)~~ (Note: Gymnastics New Zealand declined to put forward Brett's nomination to the New Zealand Olympic Committee for the Olympic Games.)
Reserved places	Host nation	Host nation qualified above
Reserved places	Reallocation	Rifda Irfanaluthfi (INA)
Reserved places	Tripartite invitation	Lynnzee Brown (HAI)
Total		35

== Rhythmic ==
=== Individual all-around ===
Event	Standard	Qualified NOC
2022 Rhythmic Gymnastics World Championships; Places 1–3 (max. 2 per NOC)	All-around	Italy; Germany; Bulgaria
2023 Rhythmic Gymnastics World Championships; Places 1–15 (max. 2 per NOC) (Note: Athletes from NOCs with two quotas from the 2022 World Championships are not eligible.)	All-around	Bulgaria; Slovenia; Spain; Israel; Ukraine; Uzbekistan; Germany; Hungary; Azerbaijan; France; Brazil; Italy; Spain; Romania
2024 Continental Championships; All-around (max. 1 per NOC)	Africa	Aliaa Saleh (EGY)
2024 Continental Championships; All-around (max. 1 per NOC)	Asia	Elzhana Taniyeva (KAZ)
2024 Continental Championships; All-around (max. 1 per NOC)	2023 Pan American Games	Evita Griskenas (USA)
2024 Continental Championships; All-around (max. 1 per NOC)	Europe	Vera Tugolukova (CYP)
2024 Continental Championships; All-around (max. 1 per NOC)	Oceania	Alexandra Kiroi-Bogatyreva (AUS)
Reserved places	Host nation	Host nation qualified above
Reserved places	Reallocation	Wang Zilu (CHN)
Reserved places	Tripartite invitation	Praewa Misato Philaphandeth (LAO)
Total		24

=== Group all-around ===
Event	Standard	Qualified team
2022 Rhythmic Gymnastics World Championships; Team places 1–3	All-around	Bulgaria; Israel; Spain
2023 Rhythmic Gymnastics World Championships; Team places 1–5	All-around (among non-qualified groups)	China; Italy; Ukraine; Brazil; France
2024 Continental Championships; All-around (max. 1 per NOC)	Africa	Egypt
2024 Continental Championships; All-around (max. 1 per NOC)	Asia	Uzbekistan
2024 Continental Championships; All-around (max. 1 per NOC)	2023 Pan American Games	Mexico
2024 Continental Championships; All-around (max. 1 per NOC)	Europe	Azerbaijan
2024 Continental Championships; All-around (max. 1 per NOC)	Oceania	Australia
Reserved places	Host nation	Host nation qualified above
Reserved places	Reallocation	Germany
Total		70

== Trampoline ==
=== Men's ===
Event	Standard		Quotas awarded	Qualified NOC
2023 Trampoline Gymnastics World Championships	Top 8 (max. 1 per NOC)		5	China; Japan; Portugal; Great Britain; Austria
2023–2024 Trampoline World Cup series	Up to 12 gymnasts qualified		10	China; New Zealand; France; Individual Neutral Athletes; Brazil; United States; Spain; Colombia; Kazakhstan; Germany
2024 Continental Championships	1 per continent	Europe	0	—
2024 Continental Championships	1 per continent	Asia	0	—
2024 Continental Championships	1 per continent	Africa	~~1~~	—
2024 Continental Championships	1 per continent	Oceania	0	—
2024 Continental Championships	1 per continent	Americas	0	—
Reserved places	Host nation		0	—
Reserved places	Tripartite invitation		0	—
Reallocation of Continental quota			1	Australia
Total			16	

=== Women's ===
Event	Standard		Quotas awarded	Qualified NOC
2023 Trampoline Gymnastics World Championships	Top 8 (max. 1 per NOC)		5	Great Britain; China; United States; Canada; Brazil
2023–2024 Trampoline World Cup series	Up to 12 gymnasts qualified		10	China; Great Britain; Japan; Individual Neutral Athletes; France; New Zealand; Spain; Azerbaijan; Individual Neutral Athletes; Georgia
2024 Continental Championships	1 per continent	Europe	0	—
2024 Continental Championships	1 per continent	Asia	0	—
2024 Continental Championships	1 per continent	Africa	1	Malak Hamza (EGY)
2024 Continental Championships	1 per continent	Oceania	0	—
2024 Continental Championships	1 per continent	Americas	0	—
Reserved places	Host nation		0	—
Reserved places	Tripartite invitation		0	—
Total			16	
