= An Chang-ok =

North Korean gymnast

- Born: 23 April 2003 (age 23) Pyongyang, North Korea
- Height: 1.54 m (5 ft 1 in)

Gymnastics career
- Discipline: Women's artistic gymnastics
- Country represented: North Korea; (2017–present)
Medal record
Women's artistic gymnastics
Representing North Korea
Asian Games
Gold medal – first place	2022 Hangzhou	Vault
Gold medal – first place	2022 Hangzhou	Uneven bars
Silver medal – second place	2026 Aichi-Nagoya	Vault
Bronze medal – third place	2022 Hangzhou	Team
Bronze medal – third place	2026 Aichi-Nagoya	Team
Asian Championships
Silver medal – second place	2026 Zunyi	Vault
FIG World Cup
Event / 1st / 2nd / 3rd; Apparatus World Cup / 2 / 2 / 0

An Chang-ok (born 23 April 2003) is a North Korean artistic gymnast. She is the 2022 Asian Games vault and uneven bars champion. She also contributed to North Korea's bronze medal finish at the event. She represented North Korea at the 2024 Summer Olympics.

== Career ==
An made her international debut at the 2017 Junior Asian Championships where she finished 15th in the all-around.

An became age-eligible for senior competitions in 2019. She made her senior debut at the 2019 Doha World Cup, but she did not qualify for any finals. Her best result was 17th place on the uneven bars. Then at the 2019 World Championships, she helped the North Korean team place 20th in the qualification round. She finished 60th in the individual all-around qualification.

An represented North Korea at the 2022 Asian Games, the North Korean national team's first competition since the start of the COVID-19 pandemic. She helped the North Korean team win the bronze medal behind China and Japan. Individually, she qualified for the all-around final and finished sixth. Then in the event finals, she won the gold medals on both the vault and uneven bars.

An registered for the 2024 FIG World Cup series to compete on vault and attempt to qualify for the 2024 Olympic Games. At the Cairo World Cup, she performed a double-twisting Yurchenko and stuck a Cheng vault to win the gold medal. She won another gold medal at the Cottbus World Cup. At the Baku World Cup, she won the silver medal behind Bulgaria's Valentina Georgieva and mathematically secured an Olympic quota. She then won the silver medal at the Doha World Cup behind Panama's Karla Navas. She was the 2024 World Cup series vault champion.

An represented North Korea at the 2024 Summer Olympics where she placed fourth in the vault final behind Simone Biles, Rebeca Andrade, and Jade Carey.

== Competitive history ==
Competitive history of An Chang-ok
Year	Event	Team	AA	VT	UB	BB	FX
2017
2017	Junior Asian Championships		15				
2019
2019	World Championships	20					
2023
2023	Asian Games	3rd place, bronze medalist(s)	6	1st place, gold medalist(s)	1st place, gold medalist(s)		
2024	Cairo World Cup			1st place, gold medalist(s)			
2024	Cottbus World Cup			1st place, gold medalist(s)			
2024	Baku World Cup			2nd place, silver medalist(s)			
2024	Doha World Cup			2nd place, silver medalist(s)			
2024	Olympic Games			4			
2026
2026	Asian Championships	4	5	2nd place, silver medalist(s)	5		
2026	Asian Games	3rd place, bronze medalist(s)	5	2nd place, silver medalist(s)	4		
