= Valentina Georgieva =

Bulgarian artistic gymnast

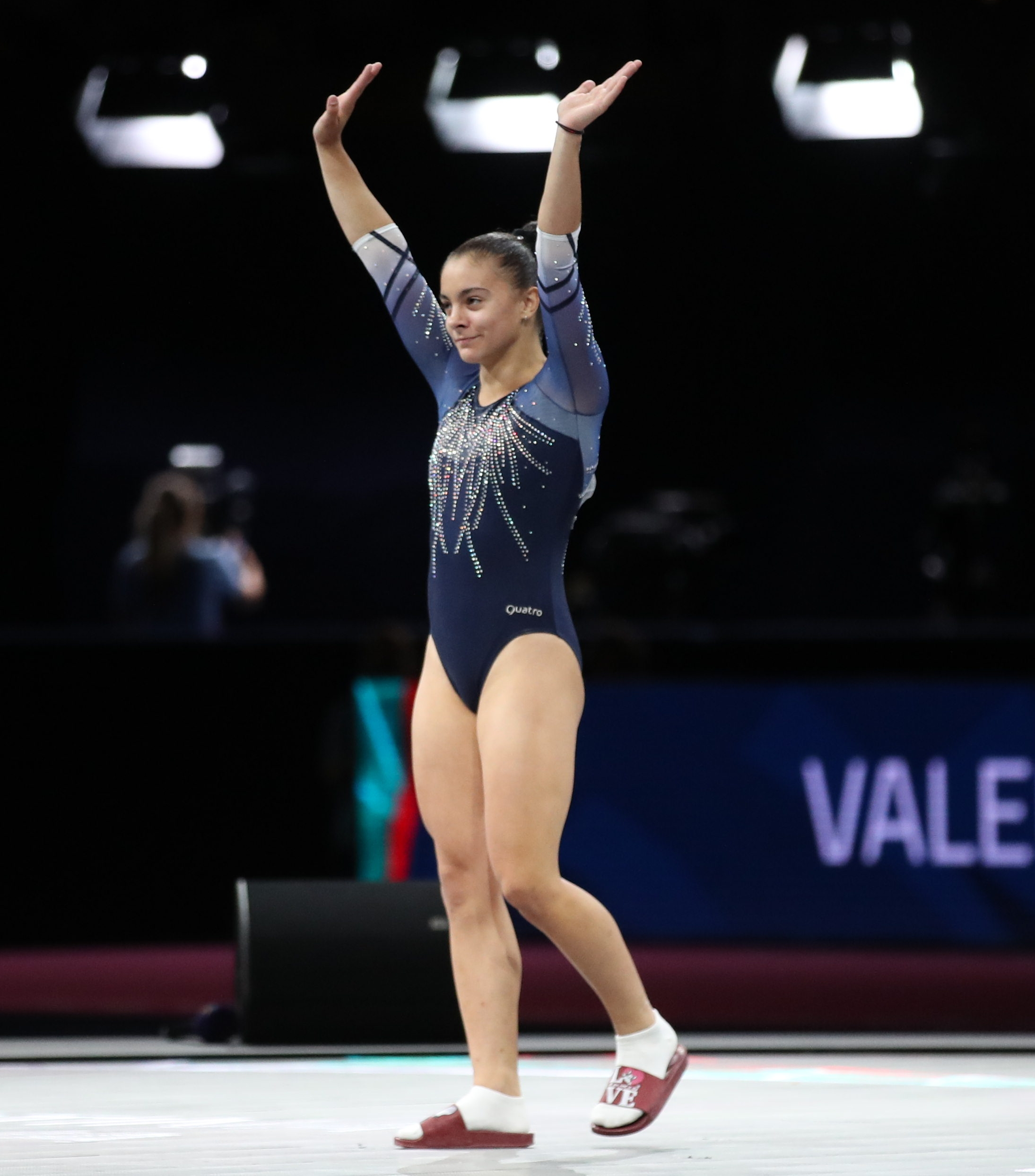
- Georgieva at the 2022 European Championships

Personal information
- Nickname: Valya
- Born: 28 July 2006 (age 20) Sofia, Bulgaria

Gymnastics career
- Discipline: Women's artistic gymnastics
- Country represented: Bulgaria; (2020–present)
- Club: Levski Spartak
- Head coach: Filip Yanev
Medal record
Representing Bulgaria
European Championships
Silver medal – second place	2024 Rimini	Vault
Silver medal – second place	2025 Leipzig	Vault
FIG World Cup
Event	1st	2nd	3rd
Apparatus World Cup	2	2	2
World Challenge Cup	2	1	0
Total	4	3	2

Valentina Georgieva (Bulgarian: Валентина Георгиева; born 28 July 2006) is a Bulgarian artistic gymnast. She is a two-time European silver medalist on the vault (2024, 2025). She missed nearly two years of competition due to an injury at the 2022 European Championships, but she returned to competition during the 2024 FIG World Cup series. She represented Bulgaria at the 2024 Summer Olympics and finished fifth in the vault final.

== Early life ==
Georgieva was born on 28 July 2006 in Sofia. She began rhythmic gymnastics when she was four years old, but she switched to artistic gymnastics at age seven. She has an older brother named Nikolay.

== Gymnastics career ==
=== 2020 ===
Georgieva competed at the 2020 Junior European Championships in Mersin, where she won the silver medal on vault behind Romania's Ana Bărbosu. She also finished 14th in the all-around, and the Bulgarian team placed eighth. She was also the Bulgarian junior national all-around champion between 2018 and 2021.

=== 2022 ===
Georgieva became age-eligible for senior competition in 2022 and made her senior international debut at the Baku World Cup. She was the top qualifier for the vault final, but she finished seventh in the final. She went on to compete at the Varna World Challenge Cup, where she qualified to both the vault and floor exercise finals, finishing seventh and sixth, respectively. She won her first senior international medal at the Osijek World Challenge Cup in Croatia, taking the gold medal in the vault final ahead of Teja Belak and Tjaša Kysselef. This marked the first time a Bulgarian female artistic gymnast won a medal at a FIG World Challenge Cup since 2017. Additionally, she finished seventh in the floor final.

Georgieva competed at the 2022 European Championships in Munich, where she qualified to the vault final in sixth place. However, she sustained an injury on the landing of her first of two vaults in the final, and could not finish the competition. It was later reported that she had suffered a femoral fracture and a torn ACL. On 9 September, she had surgery to repair her ACL as well as her meniscus.

=== 2024 ===
Georgieva announced that she would return to competition at the 2024 FIG World Cup series with the goal of qualifying for the 2024 Olympic Games. Her first competition was the Cairo World Cup where she placed second on vault behind North Korea's An Chang-ok. She next finished second at the Cottbus World Cup, once again behind An. At the third World Cup in the series, in Baku, she won the gold medal and secured her qualification for the 2024 Olympic Games. At the Doha World Cup, the final competition in the series, Georgieva won bronze on vault behind Karla Navas and An. In May, Georgieva competed at the European Championships where she won silver on vault Coline Devillard.

At the 2024 Olympic Games Georgieva qualified to the vault final where she ultimately finished fifth.

=== 2025 ===
Georgieva competed at the World Cups in Osijek and Cairo, winning gold on vault at the former and bronze on balance beam at the latter. She won silver on vault at the Varna World Challenge Cup. She next competed at the 2025 European Championships where she won silver on vault behind Karina Schönmaier.

== Competitive history ==
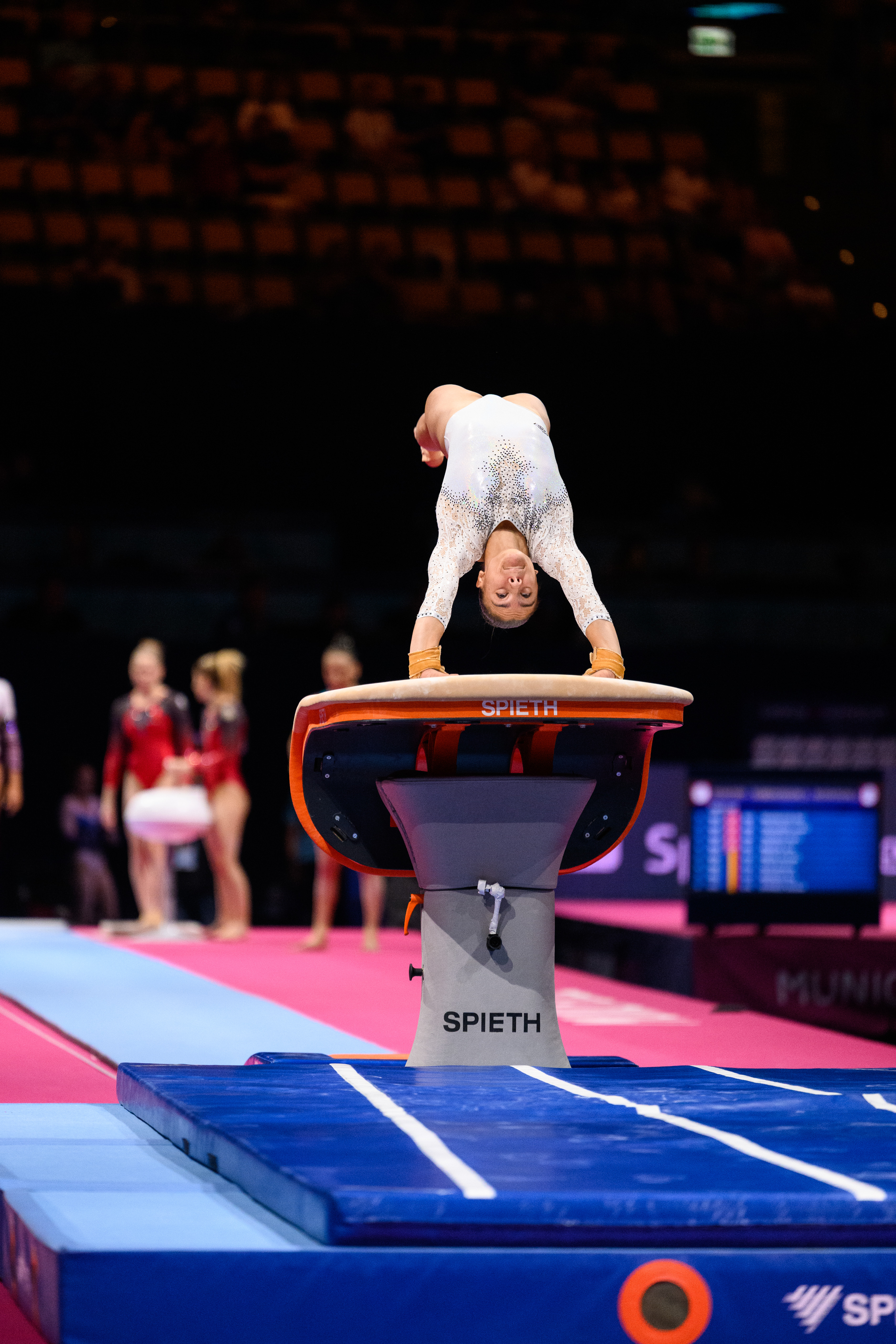
Georgieva vaulting at the 2022 European Championships

Competitive history of Valentina Georgieva
Year	Event	Team	AA	VT	UB	BB	FX
2020
2020	Junior European Championships	8	14	2nd place, silver medalist(s)			
2022	Baku World Cup			7			
2022	Varna World Challenge Cup			7			6
2022	Osijek World Challenge Cup			1st place, gold medalist(s)			7
2022	European Championships		38	DNF			
2024	Cairo World Cup			2nd place, silver medalist(s)			
2024	Cottbus World Cup			2nd place, silver medalist(s)			
2024	Baku World Cup			1st place, gold medalist(s)			
2024	Doha World Cup			3rd place, bronze medalist(s)			
2024	European Championships			2nd place, silver medalist(s)			
2024	Varna World Challenge Cup			1st place, gold medalist(s)			
2024	Bulgarian Championships		1st place, gold medalist(s)	1st place, gold medalist(s)	2nd place, silver medalist(s)	1st place, gold medalist(s)	1st place, gold medalist(s)
2024	Olympic Games			5			
2025	Osijek World Cup			1st place, gold medalist(s)			
2025	Cairo World Cup			4		3rd place, bronze medalist(s)	
2025	Varna World Challenge Cup			2nd place, silver medalist(s)			
2025	European Championships	20		2nd place, silver medalist(s)			
2025	Tashkent World Challenge Cup			1st place, gold medalist(s)			
2025	Bulgarian Championships		1st place, gold medalist(s)	1st place, gold medalist(s)	1st place, gold medalist(s)		1st place, gold medalist(s)
2025	Paris World Challenge Cup			4			
2025	Szombathely World Challenge Cup			5			
2025	World Championships					124	
