= 2024 FIG Artistic Gymnastics World Cup series =

International gymnastics contest

FIG Artistic Gymnastics World Cup series
- Location: various — see locations
- Date: February 15 – October 6, 2024 see schedule

The 2024 FIG World Cup circuit in Artistic Gymnastics is a series of competitions officially organized and promoted by the International Gymnastics Federation (FIG) in 2024. The Apparatus World Cup series (the four events held in Cairo, Cottbus, Baku, and Doha) will serve as Olympic qualification events for the 2024 Olympic Games held in Paris.

== Schedule ==
=== World Cup series ===
Date	Location	Event	Type
February 15–18	(Egypt) Cairo	FIG World Cup 2024	C III – Apparatus
February 22–25	(Germany) Cottbus	FIG World Cup 2024	C III – Apparatus
March 7–10	(Azerbaijan) Baku	FIG World Cup 2024	C III – Apparatus
April 17–20	(Qatar) Doha	FIG World Cup 2024	C III – Apparatus

=== World Challenge Cup series ===
Date	Location	Event	Type
March 29–31	(Turkey) Antalya	FIG World Challenge Cup 2024	C III – Apparatus
April 4–7	(Croatia) Osijek	FIG World Challenge Cup 2024	C III – Apparatus
May 23–26	(Bulgaria) Varna	FIG World Challenge Cup 2024	C III – Apparatus
May 30–June 2	(Slovenia) Koper	FIG World Challenge Cup 2024	C III – Apparatus
October 4–6	(Hungary) Szombathely	FIG World Challenge Cup 2024	C III – Apparatus

== Series winners ==
Apparatus	Apparatus World Cup	World Challenge Cup
Apparatus	Winner	
Men
Floor Exercise	(South Korea) Ryu Sung-hyun	(Ukraine) Illia Kovtun
Pommel Horse	(Jordan) Ahmad Abu Al-Soud	(Kazakhstan) Nariman Kurbanov
Rings	(Armenia) Vahagn Davtyan	(Hungary) Balázs Kiss
Vault	(Armenia) Artur Davtyan	(Kazakhstan) Assan Salimov
Parallel Bars	(Ukraine) Illia Kovtun	(Hungary) Krisztofer Mészáros
Horizontal Bar	(Chinese Taipei) Tang Chia-hung	(Chinese Taipei) Tang Chia-hung
Women
Vault	(North Korea) An Chang-ok	(Hungary) Gréta Mayer
Uneven Bars	(Algeria) Kaylia Nemour	(France) Mélanie de Jesus dos Santos
Balance Beam	(Belgium) Nina Derwael	(Ukraine) Anna Lashchevska
Floor Exercise	(Austria) Charlize Mörz	(France) Mélanie de Jesus dos Santos

== Medalists ==
=== Men ===
==== World Cup series ====
Competition	Event	Gold	Silver	Bronze
Cairo	Floor Exercise	(South Korea) Ryu Sung-hyun	(Cuba) Diorges Escobar	(Bulgaria) Eddie Penev
Cairo	Pommel Horse	(Jordan) Ahmad Abu Al-Soud	(South Korea) Hur Woong	(Kazakhstan) Zeinolla Idrissov
Cairo	Rings	(North Korea) Jong Ryong-il	(Armenia) Vahagn Davtyan	(Italy) Salvatore Maresca
Cairo	Vault	(Armenia) Artur Davtyan	(Ukraine) Nazar Chepurnyi	(Hong Kong) Shek Wai-hung
Cairo	Parallel Bars	(Ukraine) Illia Kovtun	(Ukraine) Oleg Verniaiev	(Colombia) Jossimar Calvo
Cairo	Horizontal Bar	(Chinese Taipei) Tang Chia-hung	(United Kingdom) Joe Fraser	(Colombia) Ángel Barajas
Cottbus	Floor Exercise	(United Kingdom) Harry Hepworth	(Israel) Artem Dolgopyat	(South Korea) Ryu Sung-hyun
Cottbus	Pommel Horse	(Kazakhstan) Nariman Kurbanov	(Jordan) Ahmad Abu Al-Soud	(South Korea) Hur Woong
Cottbus	Rings	(Azerbaijan) Nikita Simonov	(France) Samir Aït Saïd	(Armenia) Vahagn Davtyan
Cottbus	Vault	(Armenia) Artur Davtyan	(Iran) Mahdi Olfati	(China) Chen Yilu
Cottbus	Parallel Bars	(Ukraine) Illia Kovtun	(Ukraine) Oleg Verniaiev	(Uzbekistan) Rasuljon Abdurakhimov
Cottbus	Horizontal Bar	(Chinese Taipei) Tang Chia-hung	(China) Tian Hao	(Lithuania) Robert Tvorogal
Baku	Floor Exercise	(Authorised Neutral Athletes) Yahor Sharamkou	(Japan) Kazuki Minami	(Philippines) Carlos Yulo
Baku	Pommel Horse	(Chinese Taipei) Lee Chih-kai (United States) Stephen Nedoroscik	Not awarded	(Chinese Taipei) Shiao Yu-jan
Baku	Rings	(China) You Hao	(China) Zou Jingyuan	(France) Samir Aït Saïd
Baku	Vault	(Ukraine) Nazar Chepurnyi	(Hong Kong) Shek Wai-hung	(United Kingdom) Harry Hepworth
Baku	Parallel Bars	(Ukraine) Illia Kovtun	(China) Zou Jingyuan	(Colombia) Ángel Barajas
Baku	Horizontal Bar	(Lithuania) Robert Tvorogal	(Brazil) Arthur Mariano	(Colombia) Ángel Barajas
Doha	Floor Exercise	(Kazakhstan) Milad Karimi	(United Kingdom) Luke Whitehouse	(Kazakhstan) Dmitriy Patanin
Doha	Pommel Horse	(Jordan) Ahmad Abu Al-Soud	(Chinese Taipei) Lee Chih-kai	(Republic of Ireland) Rhys McClenaghan
Doha	Rings	(Armenia) Vahagn Davtyan	(Azerbaijan) Nikita Simonov	(France) Samir Aït Saïd
Doha	Vault	(Armenia) Artur Davtyan	(Philippines) Carlos Yulo	(Authorised Neutral Athletes) Yahor Sharamkou
Doha	Parallel Bars	(Philippines) Carlos Yulo	(Chinese Taipei) Hung Yuan-hsi	(Brazil) Caio Souza
Doha	Horizontal Bar	(Chinese Taipei) Tang Chia-hung	(Lithuania) Robert Tvorogal	(Brazil) Arthur Mariano

==== World Challenge Cup series ====
Competition	Event	Gold	Silver	Bronze
Antalya	Floor Exercise	(Turkey) Adem Asil	(Spain) Joel Plata	(Hungary) Benedek Tomcsányi
Antalya	Pommel Horse	(Jordan) Ahmad Abu Al-Soud	(Kazakhstan) Nariman Kurbanov	(Ukraine) Radomyr Stelmakh
Antalya	Rings	(Turkey) İbrahim Çolak	(Turkey) Adem Asil	(Germany) Artur Sahakyan
Antalya	Vault	(Kazakhstan) Assan Salimov	(Ukraine) Volodymyr Kostiuk	(Ukraine) Radomyr Stelmakh
Antalya	Parallel Bars	(Spain) Nicolau Mir	(Ukraine) Radomyr Stelmakh	(Romania) Andrei Muntean
Antalya	Horizontal Bar	(Spain) Joel Plata	(Brazil) Diogo Soares	(Turkey) Mert Efe Kılıçer
Osijek	Floor Exercise	(Ukraine) Illia Kovtun	(Kazakhstan) Ilyas Azizov	(Bulgaria) Kevin Penev
Osijek	Pommel Horse	(Kazakhstan) Ilyas Azizov	(Croatia) Filip Ude	(Croatia) Marko Sambolec
Osijek	Rings	(Bulgaria) Kevin Penev	(Slovenia) Kevin Buckley	(Spain) Pau Jiménez
Osijek	Vault	(Croatia) Aurel Benović	(Spain) Pau Jiménez	(Bulgaria) Kevin Penev
Osijek	Parallel Bars	(Germany) Lukas Dauser	(Ukraine) Illia Kovtun	(Switzerland) Noe Seifert
Osijek	Horizontal Bar	(Chinese Taipei) Tang Chia-hung	(Croatia) Tin Srbić	(Israel) Alexander Myakinin
Varna	Floor Exercise	(Kazakhstan) Dmitriy Patanin	(France) Nicolas Diez	(Kazakhstan) Assan Salimov
Varna	Pommel Horse	(Kazakhstan) Nariman Kurbanov	(Uzbekistan) Ravshan Kamiljanov	(Croatia) Mateo Žugec
Varna	Rings	(Armenia) Artur Avetisyan	(Uzbekistan) Akhrorkhon Temirkhonov	(Ukraine) Oleg Verniaiev
Varna	Vault	(Ukraine) Nazar Chepurnyi	(France) Nicolas Diez	(Austria) Paul Schmölzer
Varna	Parallel Bars	(France) Cameron-Lie Bernard	(Ukraine) Nazar Chepurnyi	(Hungary) Krisztofer Mészáros
Varna	Horizontal Bar	(Bulgaria) Yordan Aleksandrov	(Chinese Taipei) Tang Chia-hung	(Belgium) Victor Martinez
Koper	Floor Exercise	(Ukraine) Illia Kovtun	(Israel) Artem Dolgopyat	(Spain) Unai Baigorri
Koper	Pommel Horse	(Ukraine) Illia Kovtun	(Kazakhstan) Diyas Toishybek	(Croatia) Mateo Žugec
Koper	Rings	(Ukraine) Igor Radivilov	(Ukraine) Illia Kovtun	(Slovenia) Luka Bojanc
Koper	Vault	(Spain) Pau Jimenez	(Dominican Republic) Audrys Nin Reyes	(United Kingdom) Remell Robinson-Bailey
Koper	Parallel Bars	(Ukraine) Illia Kovtun	(Chinese Taipei) Hung Yuan-hsi	(Romania) Andrei Vasile Muntean
Koper	Horizontal Bar	(Chinese Taipei) Tang Chia-hung	(Croatia) Tin Srbić	(Italy) Carlo Macchini
Szombathely	Floor Exercise	(Hungary) Krisztofer Mészáros	(Sweden) Filip Lidbeck	(United Kingdom) Danny Crouch
Szombathely	Pommel Horse	(Italy) Edoardo de Rosa	(Italy) Gabriele Targhetta	(Chinese Taipei) Shiao Yu-jan
Szombathely	Rings	(Azerbaijan) Nikita Simonov	(Chinese Taipei) Lin Guan-yi	(Cyprus) Sokratis Pilakouris
Szombathely	Vault	(Kazakhstan) Assan Salimov	(Bulgaria) Daniel Trifonov	(Mongolia) Enkhtuvshin Damdindorj
Szombathely	Parallel Bars	(Italy) Edoardo de Rosa	(Hungary) Krisztofer Mészáros	(Germany) Alexander Kunz
Szombathely	Horizontal Bar	(Hungary) Krisztofer Mészáros	(Italy) Lorenzo Bonicelli	(Hungary) Szilard Zavory

=== Women ===
==== World Cup series ====
Competition	Event	Gold	Silver	Bronze
Cairo	Vault	(North Korea) An Chang-ok	(Bulgaria) Valentina Georgieva	(India) Pranati Nayak
Cairo	Uneven Bars	(China) Huang Zhuofan	(China) Luo Huan	(United Kingdom) Ondine Achampong
Cairo	Balance Beam	(Belgium) Nina Derwael	(Belgium) Erika Pinxten	(Japan) Mana Okamura
Cairo	Floor Exercise	(Japan) Mana Okamura	(Philippines) Emma Malabuyo	(Spain) Laura Casabuena
Cottbus	Vault	(North Korea) An Chang-ok	(Bulgaria) Valentina Georgieva	(Panama) Karla Navas
Cottbus	Uneven Bars	(Algeria) Kaylia Nemour	(Authorised Neutral Athletes) Alena Tsitavets	(Belgium) Maellyse Brassart
Cottbus	Balance Beam	(China) Zhou Yaqin	(Japan) Urara Ashikawa	(Japan) Haruka Nakamura
Cottbus	Floor Exercise	(China) Zhou Yaqin	(China) Chen Xinyi	(Austria) Charlize Mörz
Baku	Vault	(Bulgaria) Valentina Georgieva	(North Korea) An Chang-ok	(Panama) Karla Navas
Baku	Uneven Bars	(Algeria) Kaylia Nemour	(Italy) Elisa Iorio	(United States) Katelyn Jong
Baku	Balance Beam	(China) Zhang Qingying	(Japan) Takezawa Kaoruko	(Belgium) Nina Derwael
Baku	Floor Exercise	(Austria) Charlize Mörz	(China) Ou Yushan	(Algeria) Kaylia Nemour
Doha	Vault	(Panama) Karla Navas	(North Korea) An Chang-ok	(Bulgaria) Valentina Georgieva
Doha	Uneven Bars	(Algeria) Kaylia Nemour	(Philippines) Levi Ruivivar	(Authorised Neutral Athletes) Alena Tsitavets
Doha	Balance Beam	(Ukraine) Anna Lashchevska	(Algeria) Kaylia Nemour	(Italy) Chiara Barzasi
Doha	Floor Exercise	(Algeria) Kaylia Nemour	(United Kingdom) Ruby Evans	(Spain) Laura Casabuena

==== World Challenge Cup series ====
Competition	Event	Gold	Silver	Bronze
Antalya	Vault	(Slovenia) Tjaša Kysselef	(Uzbekistan) Oksana Chusovitina	(Hungary) Gréta Mayer
Antalya	Uneven Bars	(France) Mélanie de Jesus dos Santos	(Brazil) Rebeca Andrade	(United Kingdom) Georgia-Mae Fenton
Antalya	Balance Beam	(China) Sun Xinyi	(Brazil) Flávia Saraiva	(Chinese Taipei) Yang Ko-wen
Antalya	Floor Exercise	(Brazil) Jade Barbosa	(France) Morgane Osyssek-Reimer	(France) Mélanie de Jesus dos Santos
Osijek	Vault	(France) Coline Devillard	(Hungary) Gréta Mayer	(Slovenia) Tjaša Kysselef
Osijek	Uneven Bars	(France) Mélanie de Jesus dos Santos	(Ukraine) Anna Lashchevska	(Croatia) Sara Šulekić
Osijek	Balance Beam	(Ukraine) Anna Lashchevska	(France) Mélanie de Jesus dos Santos	(Croatia) Tina Zelčić
Osijek	Floor Exercise	(France) Mélanie de Jesus dos Santos	(France) Coline Devillard	(United Kingdom) Abigail Martin
Varna	Vault	(Bulgaria) Valentina Georgieva	(Germany) Karina Schönmaier	(Mexico) Alexa Moreno
Varna	Uneven Bars	(Germany) Elisabeth Seitz	(Ukraine) Yelyzaveta Hubareva	(Canada) Rose Woo
Varna	Balance Beam	(France) Lucie Henna	(Ukraine) Diana Lobok	(Slovakia) Adela Balcová (United Kingdom) Ruby Evans
Varna	Floor Exercise	(United Kingdom) Ruby Evans	(France) Aline Friess	(Germany) Karina Schönmaier
Koper	Vault	(Mexico) Alexa Moreno	(Croatia) Tijana Korent	(Austria) Leni Bohle
Koper	Uneven Bars	(Slovenia) Lucija Hribar	(Hungary) Zoja Szekely	(Ukraine) Yelyzaveta Hubareva
Koper	Balance Beam	(Italy) Veronica Mandriota	(Ukraine) Anna Lashchevska	(Croatia) Tina Zelčić
Koper	Floor Exercise	(Switzerland) Lena Bickel	(Austria) Leni Bohle	(Italy) Veronica Mandriota
Szombathely	Vault	(Kazakhstan) Darya Yassinskaya	(Hungary) Gréta Mayer	(Austria) Leni Bohle
Szombathely	Uneven Bars	(United Kingdom) Charlotte Booth	(Sweden) Tonya Paulsson	(Luxembourg) Céleste Mordenti
Szombathely	Balance Beam	(Sweden) Tonya Paulsson	(Austria) Leni Bohle	(United Kingdom) Charlotte Booth
Szombathely	Floor Exercise	(Sweden) Tonya Paulsson	(Hungary) Gréta Mayer	(Austria) Leni Bohle

== Olympic qualification ==
The apparatus world cups held in Cairo, Cottbus, Baku, and Doha served as qualification events for the 2024 Olympic Games. The top two competitors on each apparatus (one gymnast per NOC per apparatus) earned an individual Olympic berth. Only the top five individuals per apparatus are listed.

=== Men ===
Floor exercise
Rank	Athlete	(Egypt) Cairo	(Germany) Cottbus	(Azerbaijan) Baku	(Qatar) Doha	Total
1	(South Korea) Ryu Sung-hyun	30	30	20	–	80
2	(Croatia) Aurel Benović	3	16	16	25	57
3	(France) Benjamin Osberger	16	18	14	18	52
4	(Authorised Neutral Athletes) Yahor Sharamkou	–	20	30	0	50
5	(Kazakhstan) Dmitriy Patanin	18	0	0	30	48

Pommel horse
Rank	Athlete	(Egypt) Cairo	(Germany) Cottbus	(Azerbaijan) Baku	(Qatar) Doha	Total
1	(Jordan) Ahmad Abu Al-Soud	30	25	18	30	85
2	(Kazakhstan) Nariman Kurbanov	16	30	20	20	70
3	(Chinese Taipei) Lee Chih-kai	8	0	30	25	63
4	(France) Benjamin Osberger	18	14	14	18	50
5	(Chinese Taipei) Shiao Yu-jan	10	0	25	12	47

Rings
Rank	Athlete	(Egypt) Cairo	(Germany) Cottbus	(Azerbaijan) Baku	(Qatar) Doha	Total
1	(Armenia) Vahagn Davtyan	25	20	–	30	75
1	(France) Samir Aït Saïd	18	25	30	20	75
3	(Azerbaijan) Nikita Simonov	16	30	18	25	73
4	(North Korea) Jong Ryong-il	30	16	10	12	58
5	(Armenia) Artur Avetisyan	20	18	–	16	54

Vault
Rank	Athlete	(Egypt) Cairo	(Germany) Cottbus	(Azerbaijan) Baku	(Qatar) Doha	Total
1	(Hong Kong) Shek Wai-hung	30	0	30	12	72
2	(Iran) Mahdi Olfati	20	30	12	0	62
3	(Australia) James Bacueti	16	25	5	20	61
4	(Authorised Neutral Athletes) Yahor Sharamkou	0	20	0	30	50
5	(Vietnam) Trịnh Hải Khang	18	16	0	14	48

Parallel bars
Rank	Athlete	(Egypt) Cairo	(Germany) Cottbus	(Azerbaijan) Baku	(Qatar) Doha	Total
1	(Colombia) Ángel Barajas	16	25	30	0	71
2	(Uzbekistan) Rasuljon Abdurakhimov	20	30	16	20	70
3	(Colombia) Jossimar Calvo	30	18	20	10	68
4	(France) Cameron-Lie Bernard	25	16	0	18	59
5	(Egypt) Mohamed Afify	12	12	25	0	49

Horizontal bar
Rank	Athlete	(Egypt) Cairo	(Germany) Cottbus	(Azerbaijan) Baku	(Qatar) Doha	Total
1	(Chinese Taipei) Tang Chia-hung	30	30	16	30	90
2	(Lithuania) Robert Tvorogal	20	25	30	25	80
3	(Egypt) Ahmed Elmaraghy	18	16	14	0	66
4	(Brazil) Arthur Mariano	0	20	25	20	65
5	(Colombia) Ángel Barajas	25	0	20	18	63

=== Women ===
Vault
Rank	Athlete	(Egypt) Cairo	(Germany) Cottbus	(Azerbaijan) Baku	(Qatar) Doha	Total
1	(North Korea) An Chang-ok	30	30	25	25	85
2	(Bulgaria) Valentina Georgieva	25	25	30	20	80
3	(Panama) Karla Navas	7	20	20	30	70
4	(India) Dipa Karmakar	16	–	18	18	52
5	(Uzbekistan) Oksana Chusovitina	10	16	0	16	42

Uneven bars
Rank	Athlete	(Egypt) Cairo	(Germany) Cottbus	(Azerbaijan) Baku	(Qatar) Doha	Total
1	(New Zealand) Georgia-Rose Brown	30	20	0	20	70
2	(Philippines) Levi Ruivivar	14	12	18	30	62
3	(Authorised Neutral Athletes) Alena Tsitvets	0	30	0	25	55
3	(Sweden) Nathalie Westlund	25	14	8	16	55
5	(Sweden) Jennifer Williams	18	0	30	0	48

Balance beam
Rank	Athlete	(Egypt) Cairo	(Germany) Cottbus	(Azerbaijan) Baku	(Qatar) Doha	Total
1	(Belgium) Nina Derwael	30	30	30	–	90
2	(Spain) Laura Casabuena (Note: Casabuena qualified via floor exercise; therefore the balance beam berth went to Ting)	0	18	18	25	61
3	(Chinese Taipei) Ting Hua-tien	8	16	25	16	57
4	(Croatia) Tina Zelčić	0	14	12	30	56
5	(Belgium) Erika Pinxten	25	20	–	–	45

Floor exercise
Rank	Athlete	(Egypt) Cairo	(Germany) Cottbus	(Azerbaijan) Baku	(Qatar) Doha	Total
1	(Austria) Charlize Mörz	20	30	30	18	80
2	(Spain) Laura Casabuena	25	0	20	30	75
3	(Philippines) Emma Malabuyo	30	14	25	12	69
4	(Egypt) Jana Mahmoud	16	16	10	25	57
5	(Sweden) Jennifer Williams	12	12	8	20	44

== See also ==
- 2024 FIG Rhythmic Gymnastics World Cup series
