= Zhou Yaqin =

Chinese artistic gymnast (born 2005)

- 周雅琴
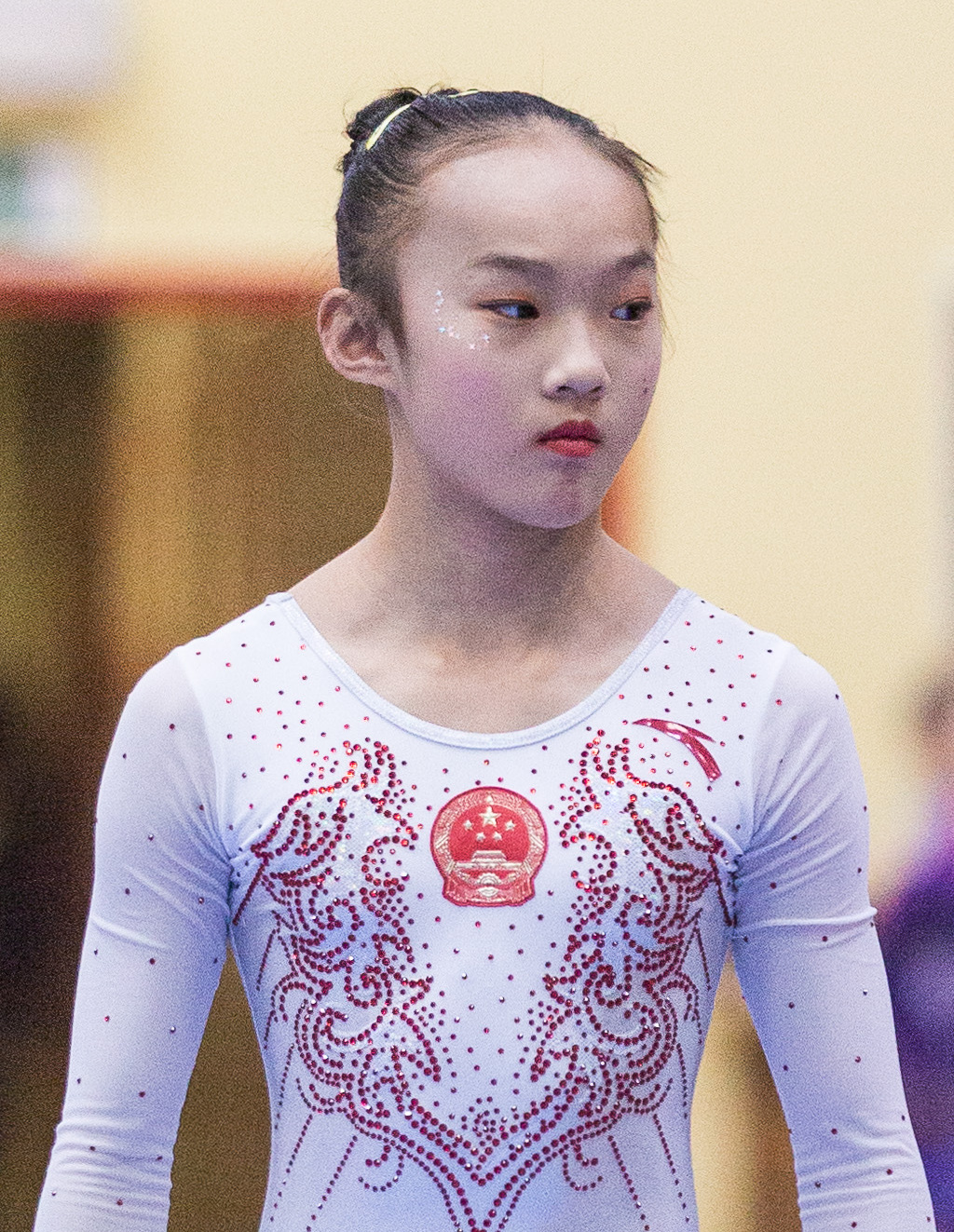
- Zhou in 2019

Personal information
- Born: 12 November 2005 (age 21) Hengyang, Hunan, China

Gymnastics career
- Country represented: China; (2019–present)
- Club: Hunan Province
- Head coaches: Jiang Suchun; Wang Liming
Medal record
Representing China
Olympic Games
| Silver medal – second place | 2024 Paris | Balance beam |
World Championships
| Silver medal – second place | 2023 Antwerp | Balance beam |
Asian Championships
| Gold medal – first place | 2025 Jecheon | Team |
| Gold medal – first place | 2025 Jecheon | Floor exercise |
| Bronze medal – third place | 2025 Jecheon | Balance beam |
National Games
| Gold medal – first place | 2021 Shaanxi | Balance Beam |

Zhou Yaqin (Chinese: 周雅琴; pinyin: Zhōu Yǎqín; born 12 November 2005) is a Chinese artistic gymnast. She is the 2024 Olympic and 2023 World balance beam silver medalist.

== Career ==
Zhou began gymnastics in Hengyang when she was three years old.

=== Junior ===
Zhou competed with the Hunan provincial team at the 2019 Chinese Championships where they finished sixth. Then at the China National Youth Games, she finished 14th in the all-around. She then finished 13th in the all-around at the 2019 Chinese Individual Championships. She made her international debut at the 2019 Olympic Hopes Cup in Liberec, Czech Republic where the Chinese team won the gold medal. Individually, she finished seventh in the all-around and eighth in the floor exercise final. At the 2020 Chinese Championships, Zhou finished 17th in the all-around. Then at the Chinese Individual Championships, she won the gold medal on the balance beam with a score of 15.066.

=== Senior ===
Zhou became age-eligible for senior international competitions in 2021. At the 2021 Chinese Championships, she finished 23rd in the all-around qualification round and sixth with the Hunan provincial team. Then at the 2021 National Games of China, she won the gold medal on the balance beam with a score of 14.660. She finished fourth on the balance beam at the 2022 Chinese Championships.

At the 2023 Chinese Championships, Zhou won the gold medal on the floor exercise. She made her senior international debut at the 2023 World Championships in Antwerp. The Chinese team consisted of Ou Yushan, Qiu Qiyuan, Zhang Qingying, Huang Zhuofan, and alternate Wu Ran, and they placed fourth in the team final. Individually, she qualified for the balance beam and floor exercise finals. In the balance beam final, she won the silver medal behind Simone Biles. She finished only 0.100 behind Biles, which was the smallest margin of victory for Biles in a World final since 2014. She then finished seventh in the floor exercise final.

Zhou began the 2024 season at the Cottbus World Cup, winning gold medals on both the balance beam and floor exercise. Then at the DTB Pokal Team Challenge, she won a gold medal with the Chinese team, and she finished fifth in the floor exercise final. She was selected to represent China at the 2024 Summer Olympics alongside Luo Huan, Ou Yushan, Qiu Qiyuan and Zhang Yihan. The team qualified for the final in third place, and Zhou qualified for the balance beam final in first place. She fell off the balance beam twice in the team final, and the Chinese team finished sixth. In the balance beam final, she grabbed the beam on a side jump and incurred a 0.500 deduction, but she still won the silver medal behind Italy's Alice D'Amato.

Zhou went viral for her actions during the Olympics podium for the balance beam final. She reacted with shock as gold medal winner D'Amato and bronze medal winner Manila Esposito bit down on their medals, apparently unfamiliar with the tradition. She then mimicked their gestures, bringing her medal to her lips, without actually biting it. The interaction spawned several memes, with many Twitter users commenting on her "Golden Retriever behavior" and "little sister" energy.

A few weeks after the Olympics, Zhou again garnered Internet attention when the silver medalist, having returned home, was seen helping to wait tables at her family's restaurant in Hengyang.

== Competitive history ==
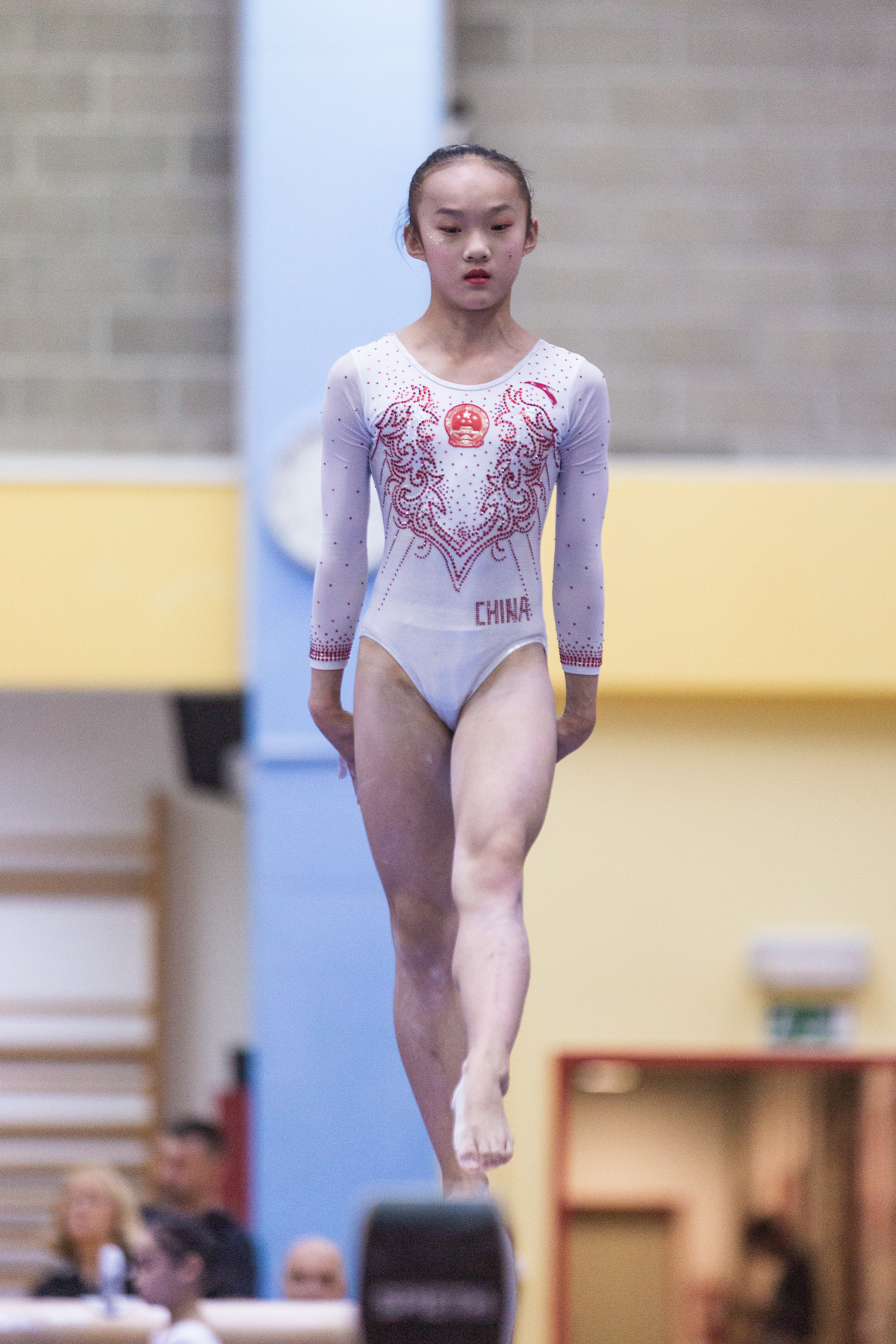
Zhou competing balance beam at the 2019 Olympic Hopes Cup

Competitive history of Zhou Yaqin
| Year | Event | Team | AA | VT | UB | BB | FX |
|---|---|---|---|---|---|---|---|
| 2019 | Chinese Championships | 6 | 33 | | | | |
| 2019 | China National Youth Games | | 14 | | | | |
| 2019 | Chinese Individual Championships | | 13 | | | | |
| 2019 | Olympic Hopes Cup | 1st place, gold medalist(s) | 7 | | | | 8 |
| 2020 | Chinese Championships | 7 | 17 | | | | |
| 2020 | Chinese Individual Championships | | | | | 1st place, gold medalist(s) | |
| 2021 | Chinese Championships | 6 | 23 | | | | |
| 2021 | National Games of China | 7 | | | | 1st place, gold medalist(s) | |
| 2022 | Chinese Championships | 8 | | | | 4 | |
| 2023 | Chinese Championships | 5 | 7 | | | | 1st place, gold medalist(s) |
| 2023 | World Championships | 4 | | | | 2nd place, silver medalist(s) | 7 |
| 2024 | Cottbus World Cup | | | | | 1st place, gold medalist(s) | 1st place, gold medalist(s) |
| 2024 | DTB Pokal Team Challenge | 1st place, gold medalist(s) | | | | | 5 |
| 2024 | Olympic Games | 6 | | | | 2nd place, silver medalist(s) | |
| 2025 | Cottbus World Cup | | | | | 1st place, gold medalist(s) | |
| 2025 | Chinese Championships | 7 | | | | 1st place, gold medalist(s) | 2nd place, silver medalist(s) |
| 2025 | Asian Championships | 1st place, gold medalist(s) | | | | 3rd place, bronze medalist(s) | 1st place, gold medalist(s) |
| 2025 | World Championships | | | | | 42 | |
