= Ahmad Abu Al-Soud =

Jordanian artistic gymnast (born 1995)

- Born: 7 May 1995 (age 31) Amman, Jordan

Gymnastics career
- Discipline: Men's artistic gymnastics
- Country represented: Jordan
- Head coach: Gurgen Sirekanian
Medal record
Men's artistic gymnastics
Representing Jordan
World Championships
Silver medal – second place	2022 Liverpool	Pommel horse
Bronze medal – third place	2023 Antwerp	Pommel horse
Asian Championships
Gold medal – first place	2019 Ulaanbaatar	Pommel horse
Gold medal – first place	2022 Doha	Pommel horse
Silver medal – second place	2023 Singapore	Pommel horse
Bronze medal – third place	2024 Tashkent	Pommel horse
Islamic Solidarity Games
Gold medal – first place	2021 Konya	Pommel horse
FIG World Cup
Event	1st	2nd	3rd
Apparatus World Cup	2	2	2
World Challenge Cup	2	0	2
Total	4	2	4

Ahmad Abu Al-Soud (Arabic: احمد ابو السعود; born 5 July 1995) is a Jordanian artistic gymnast. He became the first gymnast from Jordan to medal at the World Artistic Gymnastics Championships when he won the silver medal on pommel horse at the 2022 World Championships. He then won the bronze medal on the pommel horse at the 2023 World Championships. He is also the 2019 and 2022 Asian champion on the pommel horse. He represented Jordan at the 2024 Summer Olympics, the first gymnast from Jordan to do so.

== Career ==
Abu Al-Soud began gymnastics when he was four years old. He considered retiring in 2015, but his coach encouraged him to continue.

Abu Al-Soud won the bronze medal on the pommel horse at the 2016 Mersin World Challenge Cup. He placed sixth on the pommel horse at the 2017 Koper World Challenge Cup. His first World Championships was in 2017, and he finished 36th on pommel horse in the qualification round. He won his first major international medal at the 2019 Asian Championships, a gold on the pommel horse. He won his first FIG World Cup gold medal at the 2021 Mersin World Challenge Cup on the pommel horse.

=== 2022 ===
Abu Al-Soud began the 2022 season with a bronze medal on the pommel horse at the Cairo World Cup. He won another pommel horse bronze medal at the Varna World Challenge Cup. Then at the Asian Championships, he defended his pommel horse title. At the 2021 Islamic Solidarity Games (held in 2022 due to the COVID-19 pandemic), he was a flag bearer in the opening ceremony alongside Aliya Boshnak. He won the gold medal in the pommel horse final.

At the World Championships in Liverpool, Abu Al-Soud qualified for the pommel horse event final in eighth place, becoming the first gymnast from Jordan to qualify for an event final at the World Artistic Gymnastics Championships. He then won the silver medal in the pommel horse final behind Irish gymnast Rhys McClenaghan. This marked the first time a gymnast from Jordan and the first time an Arab gymnast had won a medal at the World Championships.

=== 2023 ===
Abu Al-Soud finished eighth in the pommel horse final at the 2023 Cottbus World Cup. At the Asian Championships, he won the silver medal on the pommel horse behind Kazakhstan's Nariman Kurbanov. He won the gold medal by nearly a full point on the pommel horse at the Mersin World Challenge Cup. At the 2022 Asian Games (held in 2023 due the COVID-19 pandemic), he made a mistake in the qualification round and did not advance into the pommel horse final. Then at the World Championships, he won the bronze medal on the pommel horse behind Rhys McClenaghan and Khoi Young. Because he finished behind McClenaghan, he did not earn the pommel horse 2024 Olympic berth.

=== 2024 ===
Abu Al-Soud registered for the 2024 Apparatus World Cup Series to earn points for Olympic qualification. He won the pommel horse gold medal at the first event in Cairo. He then won the silver medal behind Kazakhstan's Nariman Kurbanov at the second event in Cottbus. He won the gold medal at the final event in Doha, securing qualification for the 2024 Olympic Games. He is the first Jordanian gymnast to ever qualify for the Olympic Games. He was the overall pommel horse winner of the World Cup series and entered the 2024 Olympics as the world's number one ranked pommel horse gymnast.

Abu Al-Soud won the gold medal at the 2024 Antalya World Challenge Cup ahead of Kurbanov by one-tenth of a point. Then at the 2024 Asian Championships, he won the pommel horse bronze medal behind Kubanov and Uzbekistan's Abdulla Azimov.

At the 2024 Olympics, Abu Al-Soud fell twice during his pommel horse qualification routine and failed to advance to the final, scoring 12.466 and ranking 51st out of the 64 starting pommel horse gymnasts.

== Personal life ==
Abu Al-Soud is in graduate school for a degree in sports science at Al-Ahliyya Amman University.

== Eponymous skill ==
Abu Al-Soud has a skill on the pommel horse that is named after him in the Code of Points.

Apparatus	Name	Description	Difficulty (Note: Valid for the 2022–2024 Code of Points)	Added to Code of Points
Pommel horse	Abu Al Soud	Reverse Stockli from cross support on one end to the other	D	2019 Koper World Challenge Cup
