= Kevin Penev =

American-born Bulgarian artistic gymnast (born 2000)

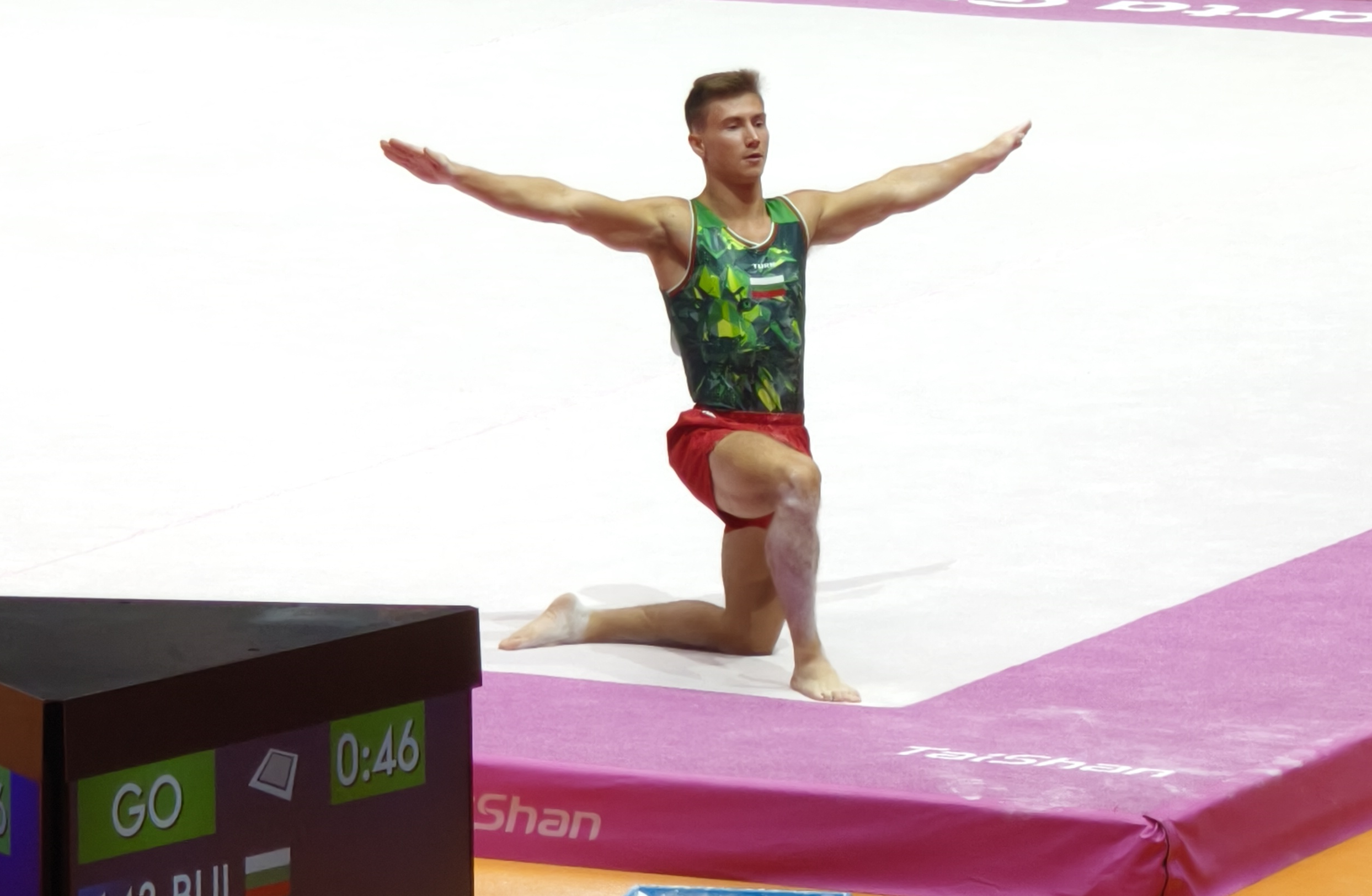
- Penev at 2025 World Championships

Personal information
- Born: 30 March 2000 (age 26)

Gymnastics career
- Discipline: Men's artistic gymnastics
- Country represented: Bulgaria
- Former countries represented: United States
- College team: Michigan Wolverines (2019)
- Head coach: Milko Tankouchev
Medal record
Representing Bulgaria
FIG World Cup
Event	1st	2nd	3rd
World Challenge Cup	1	2	2
Total	1	2	2

Kevin Penev (born 30 March 2000) is an American-born Bulgarian artistic gymnast. He represented Bulgaria at the 2024 Summer Olympics.

== Early life ==
Penev was born in 2000 in New York. His parents, Yulia Hristova and Marian Penev, both represented Bulgaria at international gymnastics competitions. His older brother Eddie Penev also competed for the United States and Bulgaria in gymnastics.

== Gymnastics career ==
Penev competed for the University of Michigan gymnastics team in 2019. He tied for second place on the floor exercise at the Big Ten Championships.

Penev and his brother Eddie announced they would begin competing for Bulgaria in 2023. His nationality change was approved by the International Gymnastics Federation in May 2023. He was selected to compete for Bulgaria at the 2023 World Championships in Antwerp. He qualified for the vault final and finished in eighth place. As the highest-placing gymnast on vault who did not already qualify through the team or all-around, Penev qualified for the 2024 Olympic Games.
