= 2020 in artistic gymnastics =

Below is a list of notable men's and women's artistic gymnastics international events scheduled to be held in 2020, as well as the medalists.

== Calendar of events ==
Date	Location	Event	Men's winners	Women's winners
February 20–23	(Australia) Melbourne	FIG World Cup	FX: (South Korea) Ryu Sung-hyun; PH: (United States) Stephen Nedoroscik; SR: (Greece) Eleftherios Petrounias; VT: (South Korea) Shin Jea-hwan; PB: (Russia) Vladislav Polyashov; HB: (Netherlands) Epke Zonderland	VT: (United States) Jade Carey; UB: (Ukraine) Diana Varinska; BB: (Japan) Urara Ashikawa; FX: (United States) Jade Carey
March 7	(United States) Milwaukee	FIG All-Around World Cup	AA: (United States) Sam Mikulak	AA: (United States) Morgan Hurd
March 12–15	(Azerbaijan) Baku	FIG World Cup	FX: (Turkey) Abdelrahman Elgamal; PH: (China) Weng Hao; SR: (Greece) Eleftherios Petrounias; VT: (South Korea) Shin Jea-hwan; PB: (China) You Hao; HB: (Turkey) Ümit Şamiloğlu	VT: (Slovenia) Teja Belak; UB: (China) Fan Yilin; BB: (Japan) Urara Ashikawa; FX: (Italy) Lara Mori
October 1–5	(Hungary) Szombathely	FIG World Challenge Cup	FX: (Slovenia) Rok Klavora; PH: (Kazakhstan) Nariman Kurbanov; SR: (Austria) Vinzenz Höck; VT: (Ukraine) Igor Radivilov; PB: (Ukraine) Petro Pakhniuk; HB: (Croatia) Tin Srbić	VT: (Hungary) Boglárka Dévai; UB: (Ukraine) Diana Varinska; BB: (Croatia) Christina Zwicker; FX: (Ukraine) Angelina Radivilova
~~May 27–31~~; December 9–13	~~(Azerbaijan) Baku~~ (Turkey) Mersin	Men's European Championships	FX: (Israel) Artem Dolgopyat; PH: (Albania) Matvei Petrov; SR: (Turkey) İbrahim Çolak; VT: (Ukraine) Igor Radivilov; PB: (Turkey) Ferhat Arıcan; HB: (Lithuania) Robert Tvorogal	—N/a
~~April 30–May 3~~; December 17–20	~~(France) Paris~~; ~~(Azerbaijan) Baku~~ (Turkey) Mersin	Women's European Championships	—N/a	VT: (Hungary) Zsófia Kovács; UB: (Hungary) Zsófia Kovács; BB: (Romania) Larisa Iordache; FX: (Romania) Larisa Iordache

=== Events canceled or postponed ===
Due to the COVID-19 pandemic, several events were canceled or postponed.

Original date	Proposed date	Location	Event
March 18–21	~~June 3–6~~; March 10–13, 2021	(Qatar) Doha	FIG World Cup
March 21–22	March 20–21, 2021	(Germany) Stuttgart	FIG All-Around World Cup
March 28	2021	(United Kingdom) Birmingham	FIG All-Around World Cup
April 4–5	2021	(Japan) Tokyo	FIG All-Around World Cup
April 4–5	Canceled	(South Africa) Tshwane	African Championships
April 17–19	~~April or May 2021~~; Canceled	(New Zealand) Tauranga	Pacific Rim Championships
May 2–5	Canceled	(Japan) Tokyo	Asian Championships
May 7–10	2021	(United States) Utah Valley	Pan American Championships
May 14–17	May 27–30, 2021	(Bulgaria) Varna	FIG World Challenge Cup
June 5–8	June 3–6, 2021	(Egypt) Cairo	FIG World Challenge Cup
June 18–21	June 10–13, 2021	(Croatia) Osijek	FIG World Challenge Cup
June 11–14	September 2–5, 2021	(Slovenia) Koper	FIG World Challenge Cup
June 26–28	Canceled	(Turkey) Mersin	FIG World Challenge Cup
July 25–August 4	July 23–August 8, 2021 (Note: The 2020 Olympic Games were postponed until 23 July – 8 August 2021. The IOC and Tokyo 2020 Organising Committee jointly stated that "the Games of the XXXII Olympiad in Tokyo must be rescheduled to a date beyond 2020 but not later than summer 2021.")	(Japan) Tokyo	Olympic Games
October 17–24	October 17–24, 2021	(China) Jinjiang	Gymnasiade
November	Canceled	(Argentina) San Juan	South American Championships

== Medalists ==
=== Women ===
==== Regional championships ====
Competition	Event	Gold	Silver	Bronze
European	Team	Ukraine	Romania	Hungary
European	Vault	(Hungary) Zsófia Kovács	(Romania) Larisa Iordache	(Ukraine) Anastasiia Motak
European	Uneven Bars	(Hungary) Zsófia Kovács	(Hungary) Zója Székely	(Slovakia) Barbora Mokošová
European	Balance Beam	(Romania) Larisa Iordache	(Romania) Silviana Sfiringu	(Ukraine) Anastasiia Motak
European	Floor Exercise	(Romania) Larisa Iordache	(Turkey) Göksu Üçtaş Şanlı	(Israel) Lihie Raz

=== Men ===
==== Regional championships ====
Competition	Event	Gold	Silver	Bronze
European	Team	Ukraine	Turkey	Hungary
European	Floor Exercise	(Israel) Artem Dolgopyat	(Croatia) Aurel Benović	(Belarus) Yahor Sharamkou
European	Pommel Horse	(Albania) Matvei Petrov	(Croatia) Filip Ude	(Turkey) Ferhat Arıcan
European	Rings	(Turkey) İbrahim Çolak	(Austria) Vinzenz Höck	(Ukraine) Igor Radivilov
European	Vault	(Ukraine) Igor Radivilov	(Belarus) Yahor Sharamkou	(Israel) Artem Dolgopyat
European	Parallel Bars	(Turkey) Ferhat Arıcan	(Ukraine) Petro Pakhniuk	(Lithuania) Robert Tvorogal
European	Horizontal Bar	(Lithuania) Robert Tvorogal	(Croatia) Tin Srbić	(Israel) Alexander Myakinin

== Season's best international scores ==
Note: Only the scores of senior gymnasts from international events have been included below. Most competitions were canceled or postponed in 2020 and therefore many top competitors did not compete in any international competitions.

=== Women ===
==== All-around ====
Rank	Name	Country	Score	Event
1	Angelina Melnikova	Russia	56.700	Friendship & Solidarity Meet
2	Morgan Hurd	United States	55.832	American Cup
3	Kayla DiCello	United States	55.132	American Cup
4	Zhang Jin	China	54.900	Friendship & Solidarity Meet
5	Larisa Iordache	Romania	54.565	European Championships QF
6	Hitomi Hatakeda	Japan	54.200	Friendship & Solidarity Meet
7	Emily Lee	United States	53.831	Gymnix AA/TF
8	Chiaki Hatakeda	Japan	53.800	Friendship & Solidarity Meet
9	Zhou Ruiyu	China	53.600	Friendship & Solidarity Meet
10	Jennifer Gadirova	United Kingdom	53.565	American Cup
11	Ellie Black	Canada	53.299	American Cup
12	Anastasia Bachynska	Ukraine	53.132	Baku World Cup QF
13	Silviana Sfiringu	Romania	52.665	European Championships QF
14	MyKayla Skinner	United States	52.631	Gymnix AA/TF
15	Asuka Teramoto	Japan	52.600	Friendship & Solidarity Meet

==== Vault ====
Rank	Name	Country	Score	Event
1	Jade Carey	United States	15.049	Melbourne World Cup QF
2	MyKayla Skinner	United States	14.517	Gymnix QF
3	Coline Devillard	France	14.249	Melbourne World Cup EF
4	Boglárka Dévai	Hungary	14.225	Szombathely Challenge Cup QF
5	Teja Belak	Slovenia	14.199	Baku World Cup QF
6	Shoko Miyata	Japan	14.166	Melbourne World Cup QF
7	Marina Nekrasova	Azerbaijan	14.133	Baku World Cup QF
8	Zsófia Kovács	Hungary	14.050	European Championships EF
9	Angelina Radivilova	Ukraine	13.983	Melbourne World Cup EF
10	Anastasia Motak	Ukraine	13.933	European Championships QF

==== Uneven bars ====
Rank	Name	Country	Score	Event
1	Fan Yilin	China	15.133	Baku World Cup QF
2	Anastasia Ilyankova	Russia	14.800	Melbourne World Cup QF
3	Angelina Melnikova	Russia	14.500	Friendship & Solidarity Meet
4	Zhou Ruiyu	China	14.400	Friendship & Solidarity Meet
5	Daria Spiridonova	Russia	14.266	Melbourne World Cup QF
6	Rebeca Andrade	Brazil	14.233	Baku World Cup QF
7	Diana Varinska	Ukraine	14.100	Melbourne World Cup QF
7	Morgan Hurd	United States	14.100	American Cup
9	Georgia-Rose Brown	Australia	13.900	Baku World Cup QF
9	Hitomi Hatakeda	Japan	13.900	Friendship & Solidarity Meet

==== Balance beam ====
Rank	Name	Country	Score	Event
1	Zhang Jin	China	14.400	Friendship & Solidarity Meet
2	Larisa Iordache	Romania	14.133	European Championships TF
3	Angelina Melnikova	Russia	14.100	Friendship & Solidarity Meet
4	Faith Torrez	United States	13.966	Gymnix
5	Jennifer Gadirova	United Kingdom	13.933	American Cup
6	Urara Ashikawa	Japan	13.850	Baku World Cup QF
7	Rebeca Andrade	Brazil	13.800	Baku World Cup QF
7	Chiaki Hatakeda	Japan	13.800	Friendship & Solidarity Meet
7	Silviana Sfiringu	Romania	13.800	European Championships EF
10	Morgan Hurd	United States	13.733	American Cup

==== Floor exercise ====
Rank	Name	Country	Score	Event
1	Jade Carey	United States	14.366	Melbourne World Cup EF
2	MyKayla Skinner	United States	14.133	Gymnix EF
3	Vanessa Ferrari	Italy	13.733	Melbourne World Cup QF
4	Jennifer Gadirova	United Kingdom	13.700	American Cup
5	Morgan Hurd	United States	13.666	American Cup
6	Emily Lee	United States	13.633	Gymnix AA/TF
7	Lara Mori	Italy	13.541	Melbourne World Cup QF
8	Larisa Iordache	Romania	13.540	European Championships QF
9	Georgia Godwin	Australia	13.433	Melbourne World Cup QF
10	Angelina Melnikova	Russia	13.400	Friendship & Solidarity Meet
10	Kayla DiCello	United States	13.400	American Cup
10	Jade Vansteenkiste	Belgium	13.400	Gymnix EF

=== Men ===
==== All-around ====
Rank	Name	Country	Score	Event
1	Nikita Nagornyy	Russia	86.600	Friendship & Solidarity Meet
2	Kazuma Kaya	Japan	86.200	Friendship & Solidarity Meet
3	Sam Mikulak	United States	85.332	American Cup
4	Wataru Tanigawa	Japan	85.300	Friendship & Solidarity Meet
5	Adem Asil	Turkey	83.232	European Championships QF
6	Oleg Verniaiev	Ukraine	83.064	American Cup
7	James Hall	Great Britain	82.999	American Cup
8	Shane Wiskus	United States	82.797	American Cup
9	Daiki Hashimoto	Japan	82.757	American Cup
10	Yevgen Yudenkov	Ukraine	82.532	European Championships TF
11	Pablo Brägger	Switzerland	82.439	American Cup
12	Krisztofer Mészáros	Hungary	82.431	European Championships QF
13	Diogo Soares	Brazil	81.298	American Cup
14	Robert Tvorogal	Lithuania	81.265	European Championships QF
15	Lee Chih-kai	Chinese Taipei	80.606	American Cup

==== Floor exercise ====
Rank	Name	Country	Score	Event
1	Yahor Sharamkou	Belarus	15.033	European Championships QF
2	Artem Dolgopyat	Israel	15.000	European Championships EF
2	Kirill Prokopev	Russia	15.000	Melbourne World Cup QF
4	Ryu Sung-hyun	South Korea	14.933	Melbourne World Cup EF
5	Adem Asil	Turkey	14.733	Baku World Cup QF
6	Milad Karimi	Kazakhstan	14.666	Baku World Cup QF
7	Aurel Benović	Croatia	14.600	European Championships EF
8	Petro Pakhniuk	Ukraine	14.466	European Championships QF
9	Dmitriy Lankin	Russia	14.400	Friendship & Solidarity Meet
10	Kazuki Minami	Japan	14.366	Baku World Cup QF

==== Pommel horse ====
Rank	Name	Country	Score	Event
1	Weng Hao	China	15.433	Baku World Cup QF
2	Stephen Nedoroscik	United States	15.400	Melbourne World Cup EF
3	Saeedreza Keikha	Iran	15.030	Melbourne World Cup EF
4	Nariman Kurbanov	Kazakhstan	15.000	Szombathely World Challenge Cup QF
5	Kohei Kameyama	Japan	14.833	Melbourne World Cup EF
6	Kazuma Kaya	Japan	14.800	Friendship & Solidarity Meet
7	Filip Ude	Croatia	14.650	Szombathely World Challenge Cup QF
8	Takaaki Sugino	Japan	14.600	Baku World Cup QF
9	Matvei Petrov	Albania	14.566	European Championships EF
9	Thierry Pellerin	Canada	14.566	Melbourne World Cup EF

==== Rings ====
Rank	Name	Country	Score	Event
1	Eleftherios Petrounias	Greece	15.100	Baku World Cup QF
2	Liu Yang	China	15.000	Baku World Cup QF
2	İbrahim Çolak	Turkey	15.000	European Championships EF
4	Lan Xingyu	China	14.933	Baku World Cup QF
5	Vinzenz Höck	Austria	14.800	European Championships EF
6	Arthur Zanetti	Brazil	14.766	Baku World Cup QF
6	Igor Radivilov	Ukraine	14.766	European Championships EF
8	Courtney Tulloch	Great Britain	14.700	Melbourne World Cup QF
8	Zhang Boheng	China	14.700	Friendship & Solidarity Meet
8	Nikita Nagornyy	Russia	14.700	Friendship & Solidarity Meet

==== Vault ====
Rank	Name	Country	Score	Event
1	Shin Jea-hwan	South Korea	14.883	Baku World Cup QF
2	Jorge Vega	Guatemala	14.783	Melbourne World Cup EF
3	Igor Radivilov	Ukraine	14.733	European Championships EF
4	Yahor Sharamkou	Belarus	14.700	European Championships EF
5	Andrey Medvedev	Israel	14.666	Baku World Cup QF
6	James Bacueti	Australia	14.616	Melbourne World Cup QF
7	Joshua Valle	Mexico	14.566	Melbourne World Cup QF
8	Milad Karimi	Kazakhstan	14.533	Melbourne World Cup EF
9	Audrys Nin Reyes	Dominican Republic	14.516	Melbourne World Cup QF
10	Courtney Tulloch	Great Britain	14.500	Baku World Cup QF

==== Parallel bars ====
Rank	Name	Country	Score	Event
1	Ferhat Arıcan	Turkey	15.333	European Championships QF
2	Vladislav Poliashov	Russia	15.200	Melbourne World Cup EF
3	Yusuke Tanaka	Japan	15.166	Melbourne World Cup EF
4	Petro Pakhniuk	Ukraine	15.066	European Championships TF
5	You Hao	China	15.000	Baku World Cup QF
6	Đinh Phương Thành	Vietnam	14.933	Melbourne World Cup EF
7	Shoichi Yamamoto	Japan	14.900	Melbourne World Cup EF
8	Wataru Tanigawa	Japan	14.800	Friendship & Solidarity Meet
9	Daiki Hashimoto	Japan	14.700	Friendship & Solidarity Meet
9	Nikita Nagornyy	Russia	14.700	Friendship & Solidarity Meet

==== Horizontal bar ====
Rank	Name	Country	Score	Event
1	Kōhei Uchimura	Japan	15.200	Friendship & Solidarity Meet
2	Epke Zonderland	Netherlands	14.900	Melbourne World Cup EF
3	Robert Tvorogal	Lithuania	14.800	European Championships EF
4	Tin Srbić	Croatia	14.650	Szombathely World Challenge Cup EF
5	Milad Karimi	Kazakhstan	14.500	Melbourne World Cup EF
6	Wataru Tanigawa	Japan	14.400	Friendship & Solidarity Meet
7	Kazuma Kaya	Japan	14.300	Friendship & Solidarity Meet
8	Ümit Şamiloğlu	Turkey	14.266	Baku World Cup QF
9	Daiki Hashimoto	Japan	14.225	American Cup
10	Alexander Myakinin	Israel	14.200	European Championships EF
10	Nikita Nagornyy	Russia	14.200	Friendship & Solidarity Meet
