= Roman Vashchenko =

Ukrainian artistic gymnast (born 2000)

- Full name: Roman Iuriiovych Vashchenko
- Born: 8 December 2000 (age 25) Bila Tserkva, Kyiv Oblast, Ukraine

Gymnastics career
- Discipline: Men's artistic gymnastics
- Country represented: Ukraine
Medal record
Men's artistic gymnastics
Representing Ukraine
European Championships
| Gold medal – first place | 2020 Mersin | Team |

Roman Yuriovych Vashchenko (Ukrainian: Роман Юрійович Ващенко; born December 8, 2000, in Bila Tserkva, Kyiv Oblast, Ukraine) is a Ukrainian male artistic gymnast and member of the national team.

== Career ==
He became European champion in team competition at the 2020 European championships in Mersin, Turkey.

== Competitive history ==
| Year | Event | Team | AA | FX | PH | SR | VT | PB | HB |
Junior
2018
| 2018 | European Junior Championships | 5 | | | 4 | | | | |
Senior
| 2020 | Ukrainian Championships | | 6 | | 3rd place, bronze medalist(s) | 4 | 4 | | |
| 2020 | European Championships | 1st place, gold medalist(s) | | | | | | | |
| 2021 | Ukrainian Championships | | 6 | 2nd place, silver medalist(s) | 3rd place, bronze medalist(s) | 3rd place, bronze medalist(s) | 2nd place, silver medalist(s) | | 4 |
| 2021 | European Championships | | | 34 | 61 | | | 44 | |
| 2021 | Cairo World Challenge Cup | | | | | 3rd place, bronze medalist(s) | | | |
| 2021 | Koper World Challenge Cup | | | | | | | R2 | |
| 2021 | Mersin World Challenge Cup | | | | | R3 | | | |
| 2021 | World Championships | | | | | 59 | | | |
| 2021 | Sport School Championships | | 1st place, gold medalist(s) | 1st place, gold medalist(s) | | 1st place, gold medalist(s) | 3rd place, bronze medalist(s) | 1st place, gold medalist(s) | |
2022
| 2022 | Cottbus World Cup | | | | | 5 | | | |
| 2022 | Doha World Cup | | | | | 7 | | | |
