= Botond Molnár =

Hungarian artistic gymnast

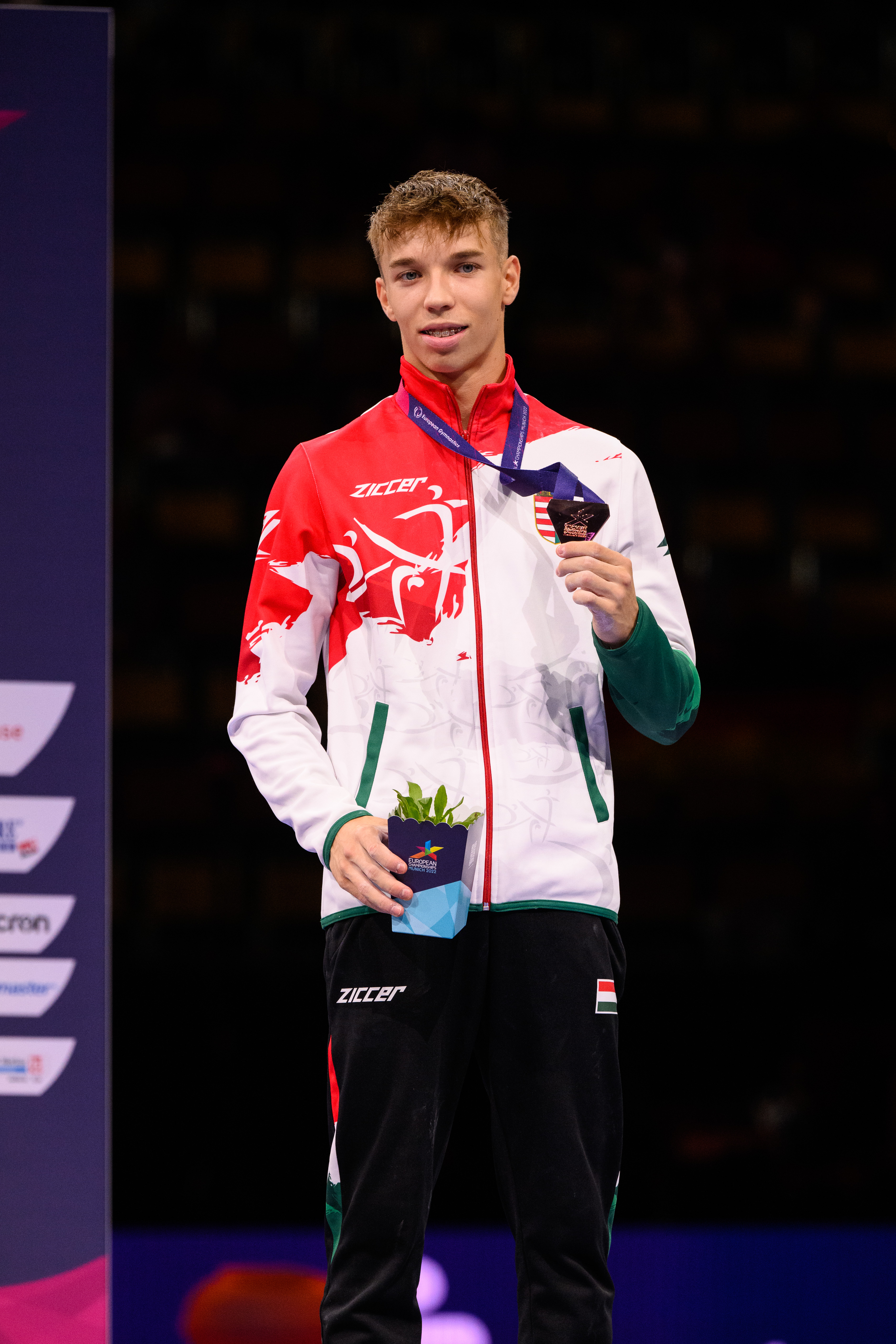
- Molnár at the 2022 Junior European Championships

Personal information
- Born: 3 September 2004 (age 22) Budapest, Hungary

Gymnastics career
- Discipline: Men's artistic gymnastics
- Country represented: Hungary
- Club: Győri Ac
Medal record
Men's artistic gymnastics
Representing Hungary
European Junior Championships
Gold medal – first place	2022 Munich	All-Around
Silver medal – second place	2020 Mersin	Team
Bronze medal – third place	2022 Munich	Vault
Bronze medal – third place	2020 Mersin	Floor exercise

Botond Molnár (born 3 September 2004) is a Hungarian artistic gymnast. He is the 2022 European Junior All-Around Champion.

== Career ==
In 2020 Molnár competed at the 2020 European Junior Championships in Mersin as part of the Hungarian Team which won silver. Individually he also won the bronze medal on floor.

In 2022 at the 2022 European Junior Championships held in Munich, Germany, Molnár became the Junior All-Around Champion and he won bronze on vault.

== Competitive history ==
Competitive history of Botond Molnár at the junior level
Year	Event	Team	AA	FX	PH	SR	VT	PB	HB
2018	Budapest Men's Friendly	1st place, gold medalist(s)							
2019	Rheintalcup		5	3rd place, bronze medalist(s)				4	
2019	Olympic Hopes Cup	3rd place, bronze medalist(s)					5		
2020	Hungarian Junior Championships		5		6	1st place, gold medalist(s)			
2020	Junior European Championships	2nd place, silver medalist(s)		3rd place, bronze medalist(s)					
2021	Hungarian Super Team Championships	1st place, gold medalist(s)	2nd place, silver medalist(s)			3rd place, bronze medalist(s)	2nd place, silver medalist(s)		
2021	Wohnen Juniors Trophy				6				
2022	International Junior Budapest Cup		1st place, gold medalist(s)		5	2nd place, silver medalist(s)			2nd place, silver medalist(s)
2022	Junior European Championships	6	1st place, gold medalist(s)	6		6	3rd place, bronze medalist(s)	9	

Competitive history of Botond Molnár at the senior level
Year	Event	Team	AA	FX	PH	SR	VT	PB	HB
2022	Hungarian Master Championships		2nd place, silver medalist(s)	2nd place, silver medalist(s)	6	3rd place, bronze medalist(s)	3rd place, bronze medalist(s)	2nd place, silver medalist(s)	5
2023
2023	European Championships	10	14						
2023	Varna World Challenge Cup			2nd place, silver medalist(s)					
2023	Tel Aviv World Challenge Cup			5			2nd place, silver medalist(s)		
2025	Antalya World Cup								7
2025	Szombathely World Challenge Cup							8	
2026	Varna World Challenge Cup			4			3rd place, bronze medalist(s)		
2026	European Championships	8							
