= Volodymyr Kostiuk =

Ukrainian artistic gymnast

Volodymyr Kostiuk Володимир Костюк
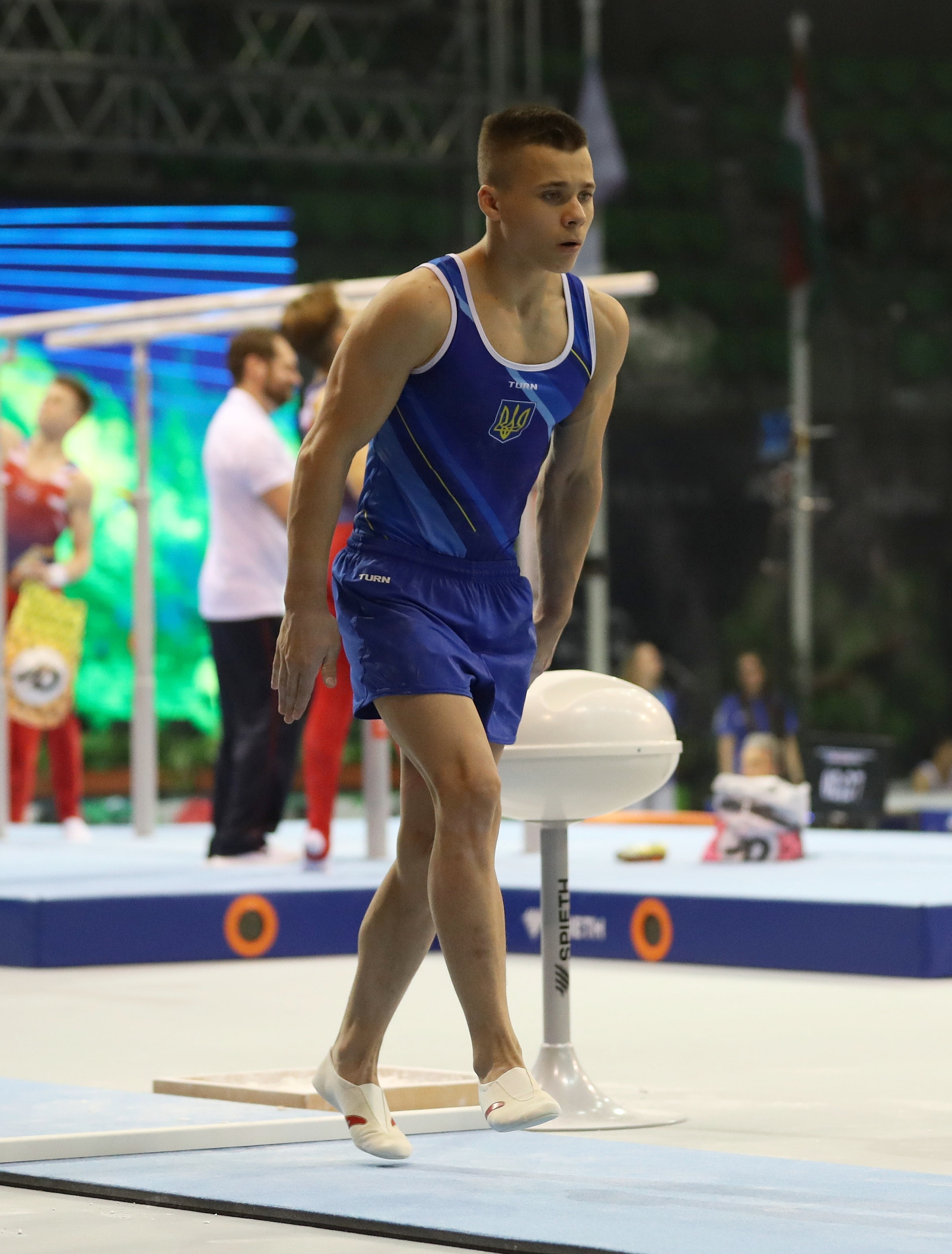
- Volodymyr Kostiuk in 2019

Personal information
- Full name: Volodymyr Andriyovych Kostiuk
- Born: 25 June 2003 (age 23) Dnipro, Ukraine

Gymnastics career
- Discipline: Men's artistic gymnastics
- Country represented: Ukraine; (2019–2022, 2024)
- Club: Dnipro Youth Sports School
- Head coach: Igor Radivilov
Medal record
Men's artistic gymnastics
Representing Ukraine
Event	1st	2nd	3rd
Junior World Championships	0	1	0
Junior European Championships	1	2	1
European Youth Olympic Festival	1	1	1
Junior World Championships
Silver medal – second place	2019 Győr	Team
Junior European Championships
Gold medal – first place	2020 Mersin	Team
Silver medal – second place	2020 Mersin	All-Around
Silver medal – second place	2020 Mersin	Rings
Bronze medal – third place	2020 Mersin	Horizontal Bar

Volodymyr Andriyovych Kostiuk (Ukrainian: Володимир Андрійович Костюк; born 25 June 2003) is a Ukrainian artistic gymnast who competed at the inaugural Junior World Championships.

== Career ==
=== Junior ===
==== 2019 ====
Kostiuk was selected to represent Ukraine at the inaugural junior World Championships alongside Nazar Chepurnyi and Illia Kovtun. Together they finished second as a team behind Japan.

Kostiuk next competed at the European Youth Olympic Festival in Baku, Azerbaijan, again alongside Chepurnyi and Kovtun. They won gold as a team and individually Kostiuk won silver on parallel bars and bronze on pommel horse.

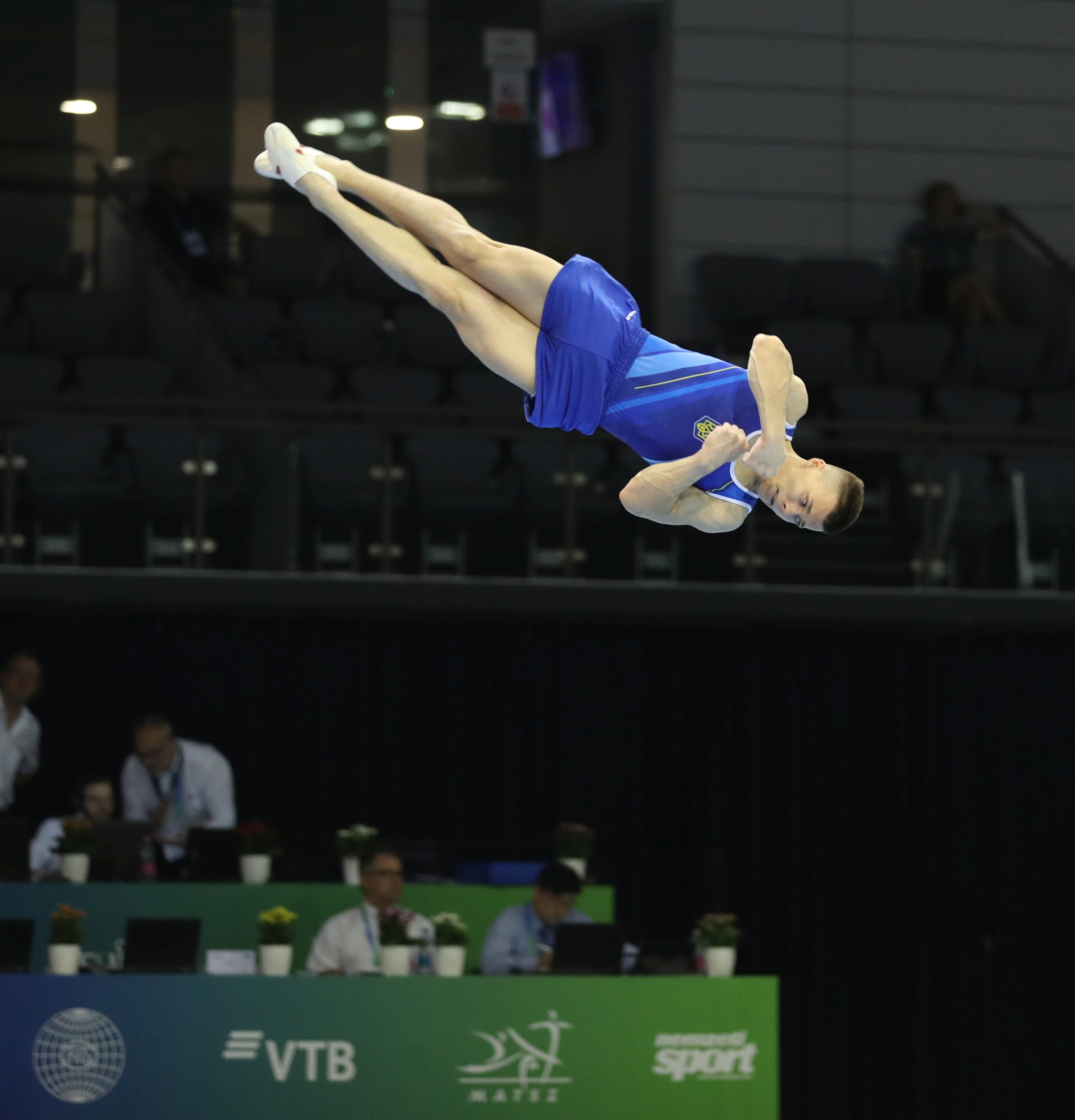
Floor exercise

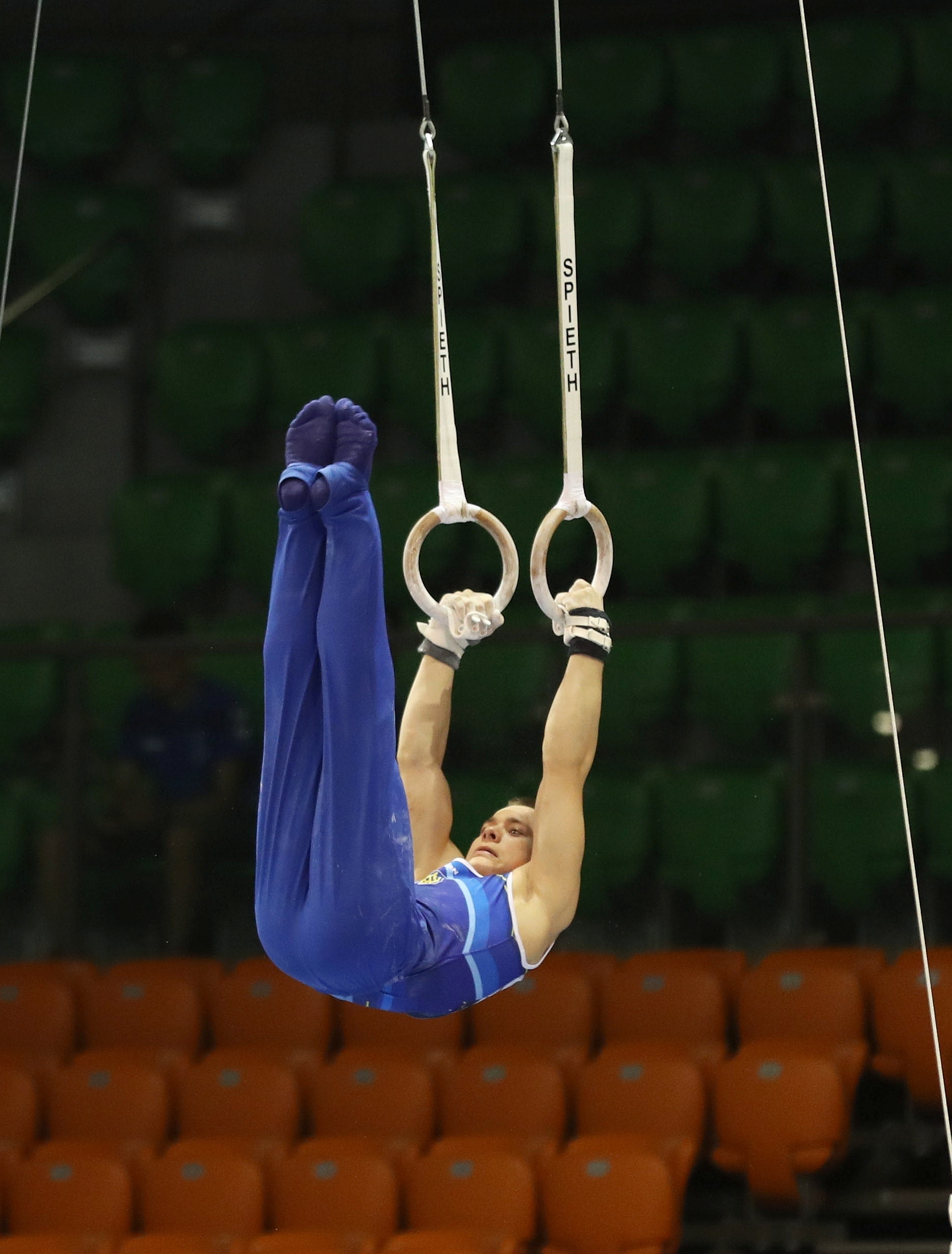
Rings

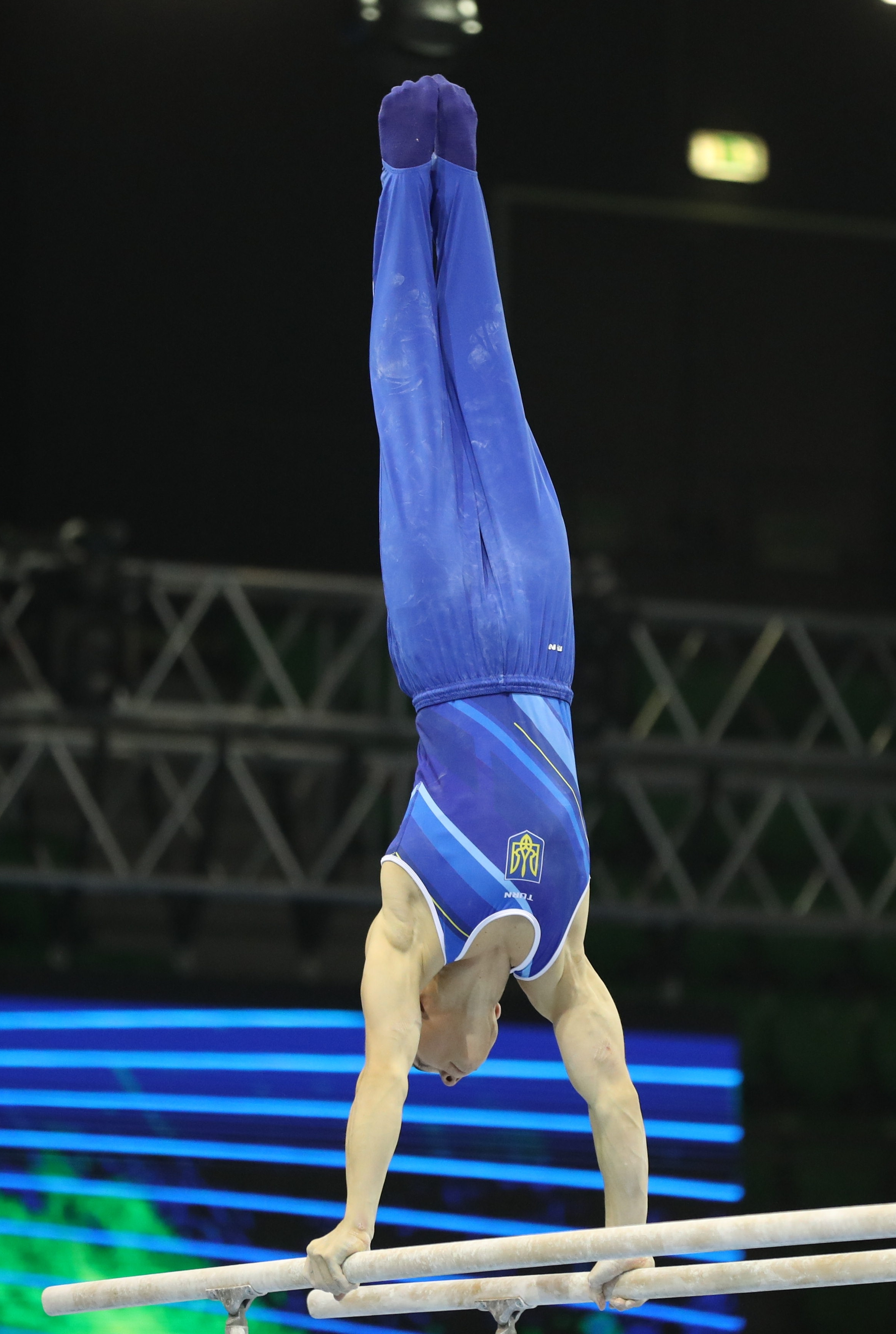
Parallel bars

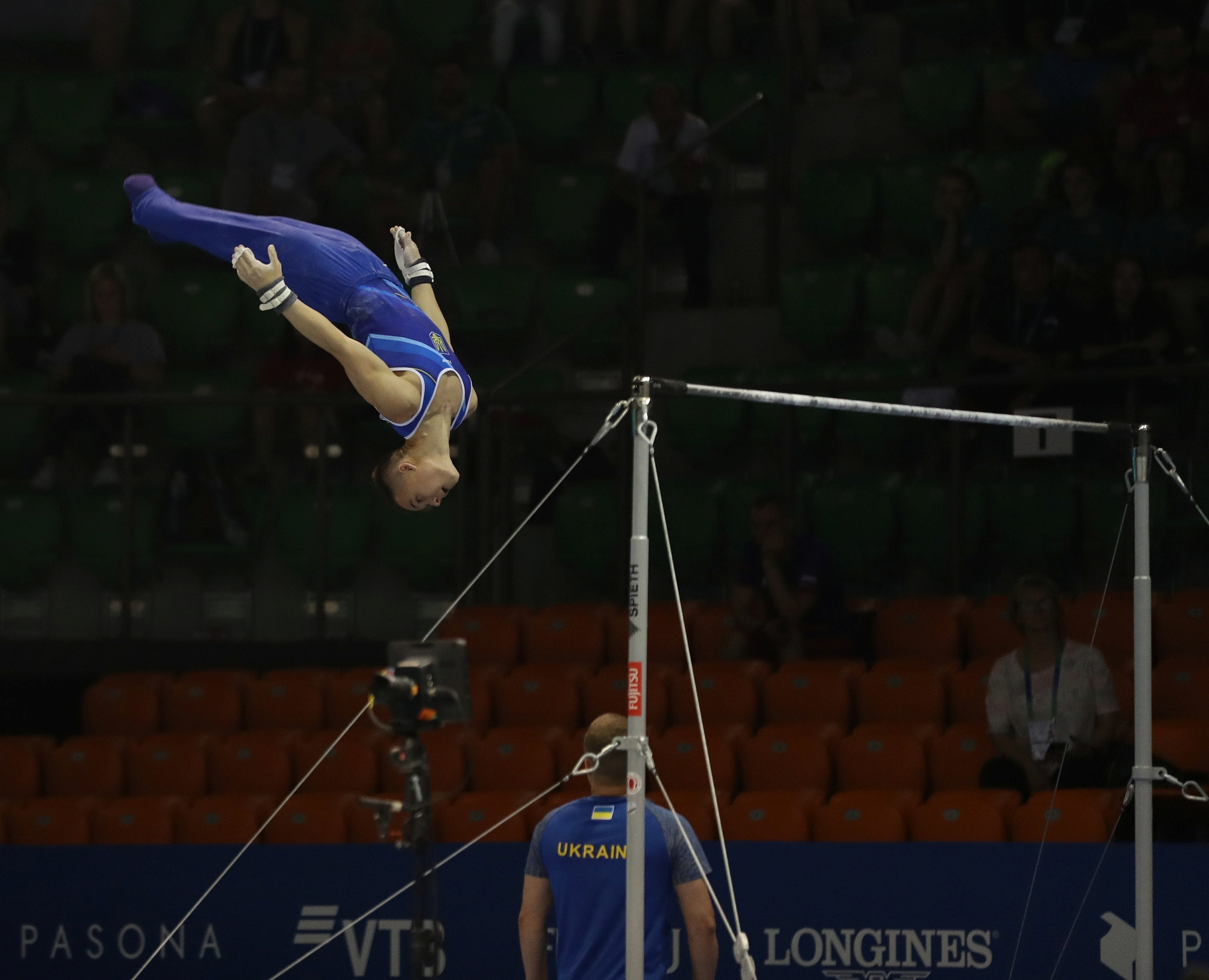
Horizontal bar

Kostiuk at the 2019 Junior World Championships

==== 2020 ====
Kostiuk competed at the 2020 European Championships held in Mersin, Turkey. While there he helped the Ukrainian junior team win gold. Individually he won silver in the all-around behind compatriot Illia Kovtun and won silver on rings and bronze on horizontal bar.

=== Senior ===
==== 2021 ====
Kostiuk turned senior in 2021 and made his senior international debut at the 2021 European Championships; he finished seventh in the all-around.

==== 2022 ====
About a month after Russia invaded Ukraine, Kostiuk was drafted into the Armed Forces of Ukraine.

== Competitive history ==
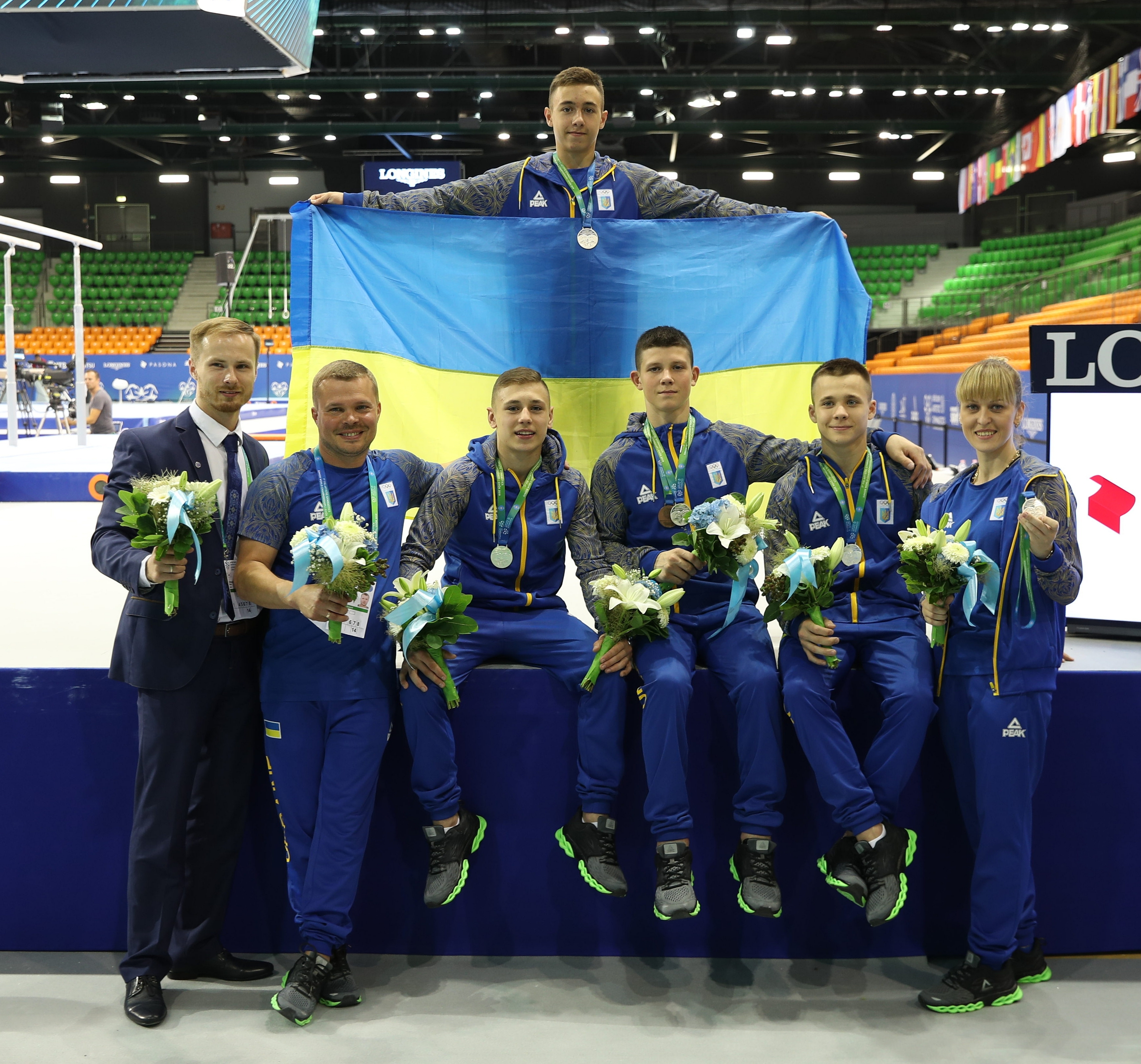
Kostiuk and the Ukrainian delegation at the 2019 Junior World Championships

Year	Event	Team	AA	FX	PH	SR	VT	PB	HB
Junior
2019
2019	Junior World Championships	2nd place, silver medalist(s)			6			4	
2019	Euro Youth Olympic Festival	1st place, gold medalist(s)			3rd place, bronze medalist(s)			2nd place, silver medalist(s)	
2019	European Games Test Event			7					
2020	AGF Junior Trophy	1st place, gold medalist(s)	1st place, gold medalist(s)	4		1st place, gold medalist(s)	2nd place, silver medalist(s)		1st place, gold medalist(s)
2020	European Championships	1st place, gold medalist(s)	2nd place, silver medalist(s)	4		2nd place, silver medalist(s)		8	3rd place, bronze medalist(s)
Senior
2021	Ukrainian Championships		4	3rd place, bronze medalist(s)	3rd place, bronze medalist(s)	6	7	2nd place, silver medalist(s)	2nd place, silver medalist(s)
2021	European Championships		7						
2021	Ukraine International Cup			2nd place, silver medalist(s)					
2021	World Cup Varna			16					
2021	World Cup Cairo			14					
2024	Antalya Challenge Cup					7	2nd place, silver medalist(s)	5	7
2025	Doha World Cup			7					
