= Benedek Tomcsányi =

Hungarian artistic gymnast

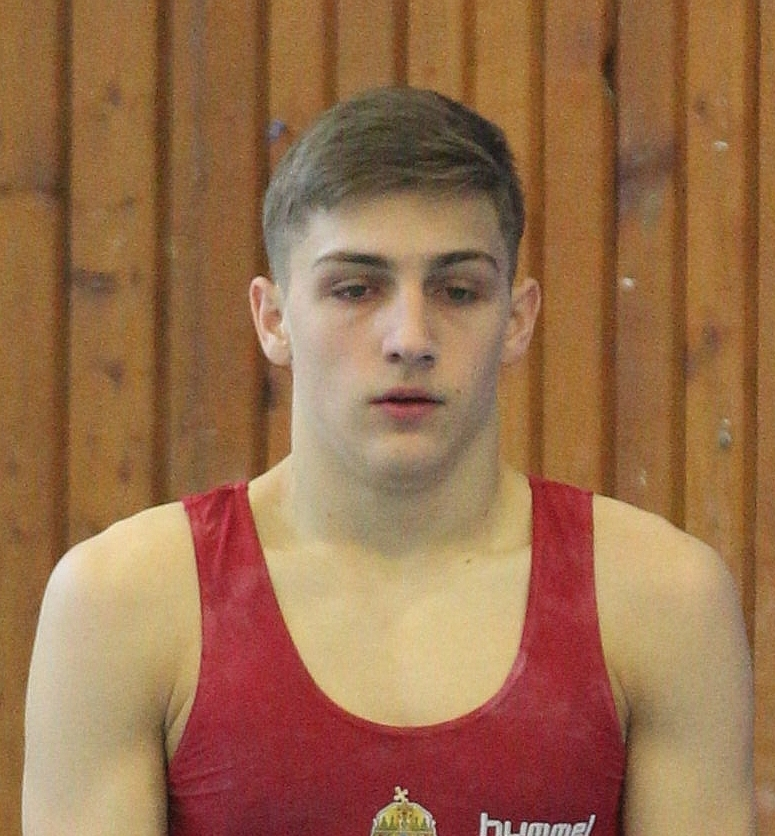
- Tomcsányi in 2019

Personal information
- Nickname: Beni
- Born: 31 October 2001 (age 24) Budapest, Hungary
- Height: 165 cm (5 ft 5 in)

Gymnastics career
- Discipline: Men's artistic gymnastics
- Country represented: Hungary
- Club: Győri Ac
Medal record
Men's artistic gymnastics
Representing Hungary
European Championships
Bronze medal – third place	2020 Mersin	Team

Benedek Tomcsányi (born 31 October 2001) is a Hungarian artistic gymnast.

== Career ==
Benedek Tomcsányi won a bronze in the senior team event at the 2020 European Men's Artistic Gymnastics Championships.
