= Szabolcs Bátori =

Hungarian artistic gymnast

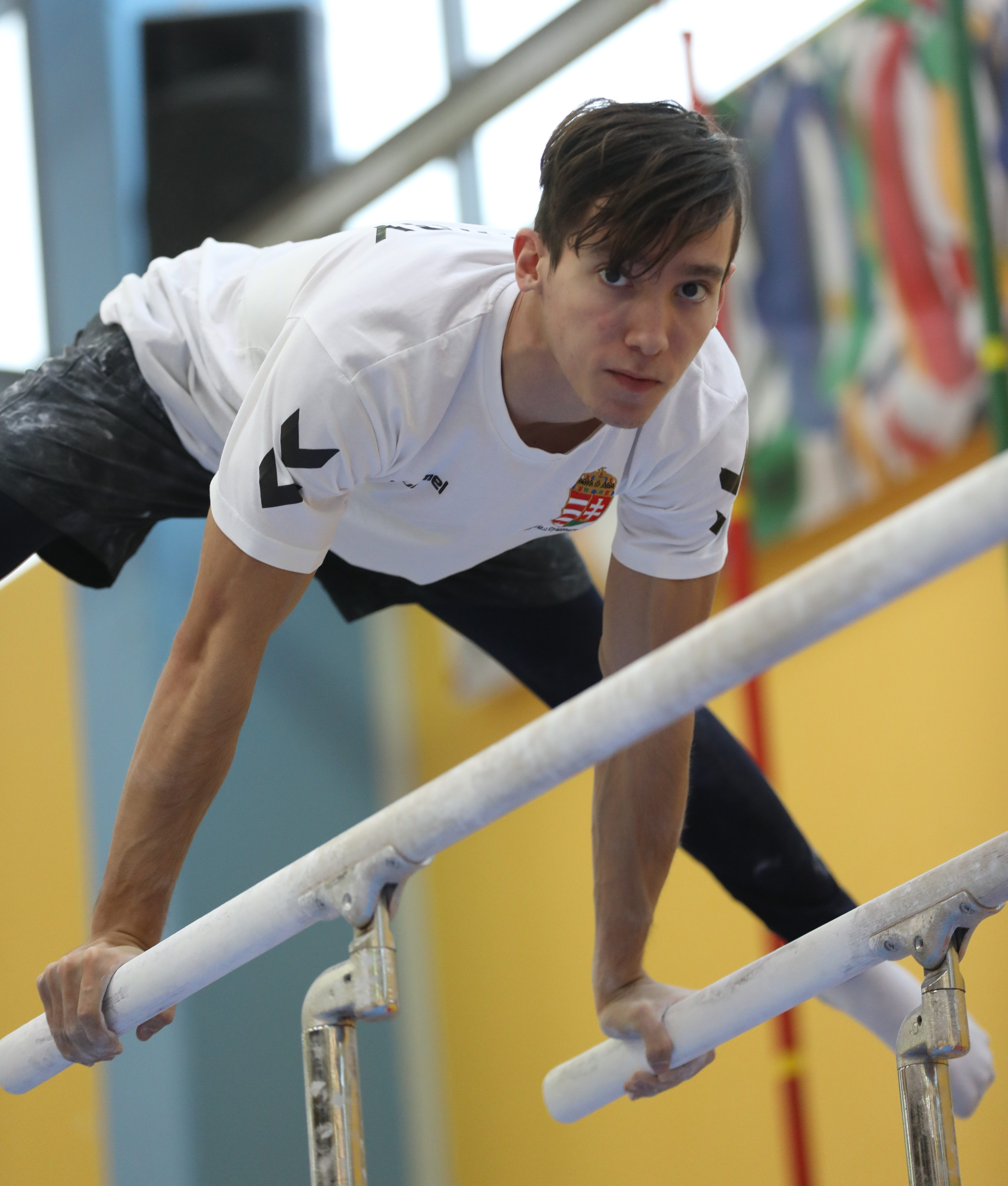

Personal information
- Born: 7 May 2002 (age 24) Miskolc, Hungary

Gymnastics career
- Discipline: Men's artistic gymnastics
- Country represented: Hungary
Medal record
Representing Hungary
Men's artistic Gymnastics
European Championships
Bronze medal – third place	2020 Mersin	Team

Szabolcs Bátori (born 7 May 2002 in Miskolc) is a Hungarian artistic gymnast.

== Gymnastics career ==
Szabolcs Bátori won a bronze medal with the senior team at the 2020 European Men's Artistic Gymnastics Championships.
