= Balázs Kiss (gymnast) =

Hungarian artistic gymnast

- Born: 5 August 1999 (age 27) Budapest, Hungary

Gymnastics career
- Discipline: Men's artistic gymnastics
- Country represented: Hungary
Medal record
Men's artistic gymnastics
Representing Hungary
European Championships
Bronze medal – third place	2020 Mersin	Team

Balázs Kiss (born 5 August 1999) is a Hungarian artistic gymnast.

== Career ==
Balázs Kiss won a bronze in the senior team event at the 2020 European Men's Artistic Gymnastics Championships.
