= Aurel Benović =

Croatian artistic gymnast

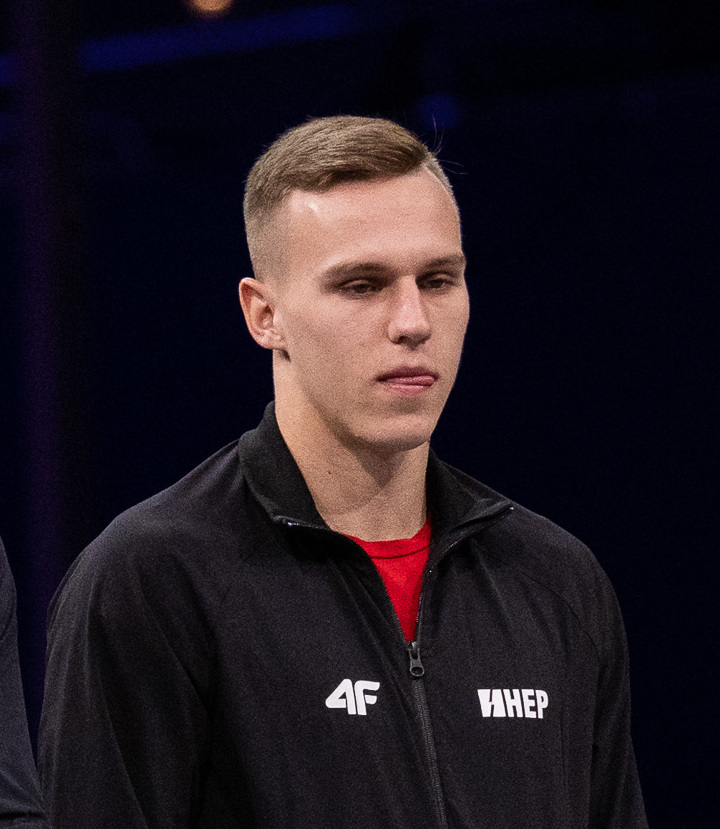
- Benović in 2022
- Born: 14 July 2000 (age 26) Osijek, Croatia

Gymnastics career
- Discipline: Men's artistic gymnastics
- Country represented: Croatia
- Club: GD Osijek-Zito
- Head coach: Vladimir Madarevic
Medal record
Representing Croatia
European Championships
Silver medal – second place	2020 Mersin	Floor exercise
FIG World Cup
Event	1st	2nd	3rd
Apparatus World Cup	0	2	1
World Challenge Cup	5	1	1
Total	5	3	2

Aurel Benović (born 14 July 2000) is a Croatian artistic gymnast. He is the 2020 European Championships floor exercise silver medalist. He represented Croatia at the 2024 Summer Olympics and finished fifth in the vault final.

== Early life ==
Benović was born on 14 July 2000, in Osijek. He began gymnastics when he was four years old. His father died during his childhood, and his mother died in 2023.

== Gymnastics career ==
Benović competed at the 2016 Junior European Championships and finished 41st on the floor exercise during the qualification round.

=== 2018–19 ===
Benović began competing in senior international competitions in 2018. He was the third reserve for the floor exercise final at the 2018 Doha World Cup. At the 2019 Osijek World Challenge Cup, he finished seventh in the floor exercise final. He then won his first FIG World Cup medal at the Koper World Challenge Cup. Then at the 2019 Mersin World Challenge Cup, he won the gold medal on the floor exercise, the first gold medal of his senior international career.

=== 2020–21 ===
Benović won the silver medal on the floor exercise behind Israel's Artem Dolgopyat at the 2020 European Championships held in Mersin, Turkey. At the 2021 European Championships, he finished 14th on the floor exercise during the qualification round. He won the gold medal on the floor exercise at the 2021 Varna World Challenge Cup. Then at the Osijek World Challenge Cup, he won the silver medal on the floor exercise behind Kazakhstan's Milad Karimi. He competed at the 2021 World Championships in Kitakyushu but did not advance to the floor exercise final.

=== 2022 ===
Benović won a silver medal on the floor exercise behind Yahor Sharamkou at the 2022 Cottbus World Cup, and he won the bronze medal at the Doha World Cup. He competed on the floor exercise at the European Championships but did not advance to the final. At the Osijek World Challenge Cup, he successfully competed the most difficult routine of the floor exercise final and won the gold medal. He competed at the World Championships in Liverpool and was the second reserve for the floor exercise final.

=== 2023 ===
At the 2023 Cottbus World Cup, Benović finished eighth in the floor exercise final. Then at the Baku World Cup, he finished fifth on the floor exercise and sixth on the vault. He won the silver medal on the floor exercise at the Cairo World Cup behind Ukraine's Illia Kovtun, and he finished seventh in the vault final. He missed the 2023 World Championships due to a broken metatarsal bone in his right foot.

=== 2024 ===
Benović registered for the 2024 FIG World Cup series to earn points for Olympic qualification. He finished eighth in the floor exercise final at the Cottbus World Cup. Then at the Baku World Cup, he finished seventh on the floor exercise and fifth on the vault. By finishing fourth on the floor exercise at the Doha World Cup, he clinched enough points to qualify for the 2024 Summer Olympics. He won the gold medal on the vault at the Osijek World Challenge Cup and finished seventh on the floor exercise. At the Olympic Games, he qualified for the vault final in third place. He also competed on the floor exercise and finished 28th in the qualification round. He then finished in fifth place in the vault final.

=== 2026 ===
He won gold medal in the floor exercise at the Challenge Cup in Szombathely in the mid-September.
