= Dávid Vecsernyés =

Hungarian artistic gymnast

- Born: 22 March 1991 (age 35) Budapest

Gymnastics career
- Discipline: Men's artistic gymnastics
- Country represented: Hungary
Medal record
Men's artistic Gymnastics
Representing Hungary
European Games
Bronze medal – third place	2019 Minsk	Horizontal bar
European Championships
Bronze medal – third place	2018 Glasgow	Horizontal bar
Bronze medal – third place	2020 Mersin	Team

Dávid Vecsernyés (born 22 March 1991 in Budapest) is a Hungarian artistic gymnast.

== Career ==
Dávid Vecsernyés won a bronze in the senior team event at the 2020 European Men's Artistic Gymnastics Championships, horizontal bar event at the 2018 European Men's Artistic Gymnastics Championships, and the horizontal bar event at the 2019 European Games.
