= Yahor Sharamkou =

Belarusian artistic gymnast

- Born: 4 March 1999 (age 27) Mogilev, Belarus

Gymnastics career
- Discipline: Men's artistic gymnastics
- Country represented: Belarus Authorised Neutral Athletes
- Head coach: Vitaliy Rybaltovskiy
Medal record
Representing Belarus
European Championships
Silver medal – second place	2020 Mersin	Vault
Bronze medal – third place	2020 Mersin	Floor exercise
Summer Universiade
Silver medal – second place	2019 Naples	Vault
FIG World Cup
Event	1st	2nd	3rd
Apparatus World Cup	3	2	3
World Challenge Cup	0	3	0
Total	3	5	3

Yahor Sharamkou (Belarusian: Ягор Шарамкоў; born 4 March 1999) is a Belarusian artistic gymnast. He is the 2020 European vault silver medalist and floor exercise bronze medalist. He also won a vault silver medal at the 2019 Summer Universiade.

== Gymnastics career ==
Sharamkou began gymnastics when he was five years old. He also trained in trampoline gymnastics but ultimately chose artistic gymnastics.

=== 2015–2018 ===
Sharamkou won a gold medal on the vault at the 2015 European Youth Summer Olympic Festival. He finished eighth in the vault final at the 2016 Junior European Championships.

Sharamkou finished fifth on the floor exercise at the 2018 Paris World Challenge Cup. He then competed at his first World Championships, helping the Belarusian team finish 24th.

=== 2019–2021 ===
Sharamkou won a silver medal on the vault at the 2019 Koper World Challenge Cup. He then competed at the 2019 Summer Universiade and qualified for the vault final, where he won the silver medal behind South Korea's Kim Han-sol. He initially finished third in the vault final at the 2019 European Championships, but he dropped to fourth place after Andrey Medvedev successfully inquired his difficulty score. He then placed fifth on the floor exercise at the 2019 European Games. He helped the Belarusian team finish 20th at the 2019 World Championships. After the World Championships, he won a bronze medal on vault at the Cottbus World Cup.

Sharamkou won a silver medal on the vault at the 2020 European Championships behind Ukraine's Igor Radivilov. He also won a bronze medal on the floor exercise behind Artem Dolgopyat and Aurel Benović. At the 2021 European Championships, he finished fifth on the floor exercise and fourth on the vault.

=== 2022–2025 ===
Sharamkou won the gold medal on the floor exercise at the 2022 Cottbus World Cup. This competition occurred during the start of the Russian invasion of Ukraine, leading to the International Gymnastics Federation (FIG) restricting the use of the Belarusian flag and anthem during Sharamkou's medal ceremony. The FIG would go on to ban Russian and Belarusian athletes from international competition. Russian and Belarusian athletes were allowed to return as Authorised Neutral Athletes beginning in 2024 given they met the neutrality criteria, and Sharamkou's application was approved.

Sharamkou won a gold medal on the floor exercise at the 2024 Baku World Cup. At the 2024 Doha World Cup, he won the bronze medal on the vault. However, he missed the floor exercise final and as a result, did not earn a berth for the 2024 Summer Olympics. He also won the floor exercise title at the 2025 Baku World Cup, where he also won a bronze medal on the vault.
