= 2020 European Men's Artistic Gymnastics Championships =

34th European Men's Artistic Gymnastics Championships
- Venue: Mersin Gymnastics Hall
- Location: Mersin, Turkey
- Start date: 9 December 2020
- End date: 13 December 2020
- Competitors: 125 (62 senior & 63 junior) from 20 nations

The 34th European Men's Artistic Gymnastics Championships were held from 9 to 13 December 2020 at the Mersin Gymnastics Hall in Mersin, Turkey. The competition was originally scheduled to be held from 27 to 31 May 2020 in Baku, Azerbaijan, but it was rescheduled due to the COVID-19 pandemic. The Baku event was rescheduled for 9 to 13 December, before the event was relocated to Mersin. Originally an Olympic qualifying event, the competition was undesignated as such in light of the ongoing pandemic, so as to avoid pressuring member federations to attend if they were not willing to do so.

Only 20 nations opted to send athletes, as the majority of countries withdrew out of concerns regarding the COVID-19 pandemic in Europe. European Gymnastics barred the Polish Gymnastics Federation from sending any athletes due to outstanding financial obligations resulting from their hosting the 2019 edition of the event.

== Competition schedule ==
The schedule of Championships:

Date	Sessions	Time	Subdivisions
Wednesday, 9 December	Junior Men’s Team Final & Qualification for Individual Apparatus & All-Around Finals	10:00 AM – 12:45 PM	Subdivision 1
Wednesday, 9 December	Junior Men’s Team Final & Qualification for Individual Apparatus & All-Around Finals	02:00 PM – 04:45 PM	Subdivision 2
Wednesday, 9 December	Junior Men’s Team Final & Qualification for Individual Apparatus & All-Around Finals	06:00 PM – 08:45 PM	Subdivision 3
Thursday, 10 December	Senior Men’s Qualification for Team Final & Individual Apparatus Finals	10:00 AM – 12:45 PM	Subdivision 1
Thursday, 10 December	Senior Men’s Qualification for Team Final & Individual Apparatus Finals	02:00 PM – 04:45 PM	Subdivision 2
Thursday, 10 December	Senior Men’s Qualification for Team Final & Individual Apparatus Finals	06:00 PM – 08:45 PM	Subdivision 3
Friday, 11 December	Opening ceremony	11:45 AM – 12:00 PM	–
Friday, 11 December	Junior All-Around Final	12:00 PM – 02:50 PM	–
Saturday, 12 December	Senior Men’s Team Final	03:00 PM – 05:30 PM	–
Sunday, 13 December	Junior Men’s Individual Apparatus Finals	10:00 AM – 12:30 PM	–
Sunday, 13 December	Senior Men’s Individual Apparatus Finals	03:00 PM – 06:45 PM	–

== Medals summary ==
=== Medalists ===
Event	Gold	Silver	Bronze
Senior
Team	Ukraine; Vladyslav Hryko; Petro Pakhniuk; Igor Radivilov; Roman Vashchenko; Yevhen Yudenkov	Turkey; Ferhat Arıcan; İbrahim Çolak; Abdelrahman Elgamal; Ahmet Önder; Ümit Şamiloğlu	Hungary; Szabolcs Bátori; Balázs Kiss; Krisztofer Mészáros; Benedek Tomcsányi; Dávid Vecsernyés
Floor	Artem Dolgopyat (ISR)	Aurel Benović (CRO)	Yahor Sharamkou (BLR)
Pommel horse	Matvei Petrov (ALB)	Filip Ude (CRO)	Ferhat Arıcan (TUR)
Rings	İbrahim Çolak (TUR)	Vinzenz Höck (AUT)	Igor Radivilov (UKR)
Vault	Igor Radivilov (UKR)	Yahor Sharamkou (BLR)	Artem Dolgopyat (ISR)
Parallel bars	Ferhat Arıcan (TUR)	Petro Pakhniuk (UKR)	Robert Tvorogal (LTU)
Horizontal bar	Robert Tvorogal (LTU)	Tin Srbić (CRO)	Alexander Myakinin (ISR)
Junior
Team	Ukraine; Volodymyr Kostiuk; Illia Kovtun; Mykyta Melnykov; Ivan Sevruk; Radomyr Stelmakh	Hungary; Krisztián Balázs; Ádám Dobrovitz; Márton Kovács; Botond Molnár; Szilárd Závory	Bulgaria; Zdravko Dobrev; Rayan Radkov; Daniel Trifonov; Teodor Trifonov; Bozhidar Zlatanov
All-around	Illia Kovtun (UKR)	Volodymyr Kostiuk (UKR)	Krisztián Balázs (HUN)
Floor	Gytis Chasažyrovas (LTU)	Ivan Sevruk (UKR)	Botond Molnár (HUN)
Pommel horse	Illia Kovtun (UKR)	Eyal Indig (ISR)	—N/a
Pommel horse	Illia Kovtun (UKR)	Gytis Chasažyrovas (LTU)	—N/a
Rings	Illia Kovtun (UKR)	Volodymyr Kostiuk (UKR)	Bora Tarhan (TUR)
Vault	Gabriel Burtănete (ROU)	Illia Kovtun (UKR)	Bora Tarhan (TUR)
Parallel bars	Illia Kovtun (UKR)	Mykyta Melnykov (UKR)	Mert Efe Kılıçer (TUR)
Horizontal bar	Krisztián Balázs (HUN)	Mert Efe Kılıçer (TUR)	Volodymyr Kostiuk (UKR)

=== Medal standings ===
==== Overall ====
* Host nation (Turkey)

Rank	Nation	Gold	Silver	Bronze	Total
1	Ukraine (UKR)	7	6	2	15
2	Turkey (TUR)*	2	2	4	8
3	Lithuania (LTU)	2	1	1	4
4	Hungary (HUN)	1	1	3	5
5	Israel (ISR)	1	1	2	4
6	Albania (ALB)	1	0	0	1
6	Romania (ROU)	1	0	0	1
8	Croatia (CRO)	0	3	0	3
9	Belarus (BLR)	0	1	1	2
10	Austria (AUT)	0	1	0	1
11	Bulgaria (BUL)	0	0	1	1
Totals (11 entries)		15	16	14	45

==== Senior ====
* Host nation (Turkey)

Rank	Nation	Gold	Silver	Bronze	Total
1	Turkey (TUR)*	2	1	1	4
1	Ukraine (UKR)	2	1	1	4
3	Israel (ISR)	1	0	2	3
4	Lithuania (LTU)	1	0	1	2
5	Albania (ALB)	1	0	0	1
6	Croatia (CRO)	0	3	0	3
7	Belarus (BLR)	0	1	1	2
8	Austria (AUT)	0	1	0	1
9	Hungary (HUN)	0	0	1	1
Totals (9 entries)		7	7	7	21

==== Junior ====
* Host nation (Turkey)

Rank	Nation	Gold	Silver	Bronze	Total
1	Ukraine (UKR)	5	5	1	11
2	Hungary (HUN)	1	1	2	4
3	Lithuania (LTU)	1	1	0	2
4	Romania (ROU)	1	0	0	1
5	Turkey (TUR)*	0	1	3	4
6	Israel (ISR)	0	1	0	1
7	Bulgaria (BUL)	0	0	1	1
Totals (7 entries)		8	9	7	24

== Senior results ==
=== Team competition ===
Only six teams advanced to the team final rather than the traditional eight.

Oldest and youngest competitors

	Name	Country	Date of birth	Age
Youngest	Szabolcs Bátori	Hungary	May 7, 2002	18 years, 7 months and 5 days
Oldest	Ümit Şamiloğlu	Turkey	September 29, 1980	40 years, 2 months and 13 days

Rank	Team	Floor (gymnastics)	Pommel horse	Rings (gymnastics)	Vault (gymnastics)	Parallel bars	Horizontal bar	Total
1st place, gold medalist(s)	Ukraine	40.466 (2)	41.366 (1)	42.500 (2)	43.099 (1)	41.599 (2)	39.933 (3)	248.963
1st place, gold medalist(s)	Vladyslav Hryko	13.700	13.466			12.500	13.433	248.963
1st place, gold medalist(s)	Petro Pakhniuk	12.900	14.400		14.366	15.066	13.400	248.963
1st place, gold medalist(s)	Igor Radivilov			14.600	14.800			248.963
1st place, gold medalist(s)	Roman Vashchenko			13.800				248.963
1st place, gold medalist(s)	Yevhen Yudenkov	13.866	13.500	14.100	13.933	14.033	13.100	248.963
2nd place, silver medalist(s)	Turkey	39.565 (6)	39.732 (4)	42.632 (1)	41.932 (2)	43.000 (1)	37.932 (6)	244.793
2nd place, silver medalist(s)	Ferhat Arıcan	13.366	13.433		14.366	14.700		244.793
2nd place, silver medalist(s)	İbrahim Çolak	12.266		14.566		14.300		244.793
2nd place, silver medalist(s)	Abdelrahman Elgamal		13.633	14.200		14.000	12.800	244.793
2nd place, silver medalist(s)	Ahmet Önder	13.933	12.666	13.866	14.600		12.566	244.793
2nd place, silver medalist(s)	Ümit Şamiloğlu				12.966		12.566	244.793
3rd place, bronze medalist(s)	Hungary	39.699 (5)	40.332 (3)	38.999 (5)	41.132 (5)	40.232 (3)	39.999 (2)	240.393
3rd place, bronze medalist(s)	Szabolcs Bátori				13.366			240.393
3rd place, bronze medalist(s)	Balázs Kiss	13.033		12.866				240.393
3rd place, bronze medalist(s)	Krisztofer Mészáros	14.333	13.566	13.333	14.033	13.600	13.166	240.393
3rd place, bronze medalist(s)	Benedek Tomcsányi	12.333	13.300	12.800	13.733	13.366	12.733	240.393
3rd place, bronze medalist(s)	Dávid Vecsernyés		13.466			13.266	14.100	240.393
4	Israel	40.932 (1)	40.399 (2)	37.366 (6)	41.166 (4)	38.466 (6)	40.699 (1)	239.028
4	Artem Dolgopyat	14.866	13.866		14.600		13.333	239.028
4	Ilan Korchak			12.200	12.833	12.433		239.028
4	Andrey Medvedev	12.566		12.866	13.733			239.028
4	Alexander Myakinin		13.433			12.900	14.000	239.028
4	Alexander Shatilov	13.500	13.100	12.300		13.133	13.366	239.028
5	Bulgaria	40.332 (3)	36.466 (5)	39.800 (4)	41.466 (3)	39.565 (4)	38.800 (5)	236.429
5	Yordan Aleksandrov	12.866	12.733	13.200		13.966	13.600	236.429
5	Dimitar Dimitrov	13.833	10.300		14.200			236.429
5	David Huddleston	13.633	13.433	13.100	14.000	13.333	12.700	236.429
5	Hristos Marinov			13.500		12.266		236.429
5	Radoslav Rachev				13.266		12.500	236.429
6	Austria	39.965 (4)	36.332 (6)	39.966 (3)	40.865 (6)	38.898 (5)	39.299 (4)	235.325
6	Manuel Arnold		11.466	13.200		11.966		235.325
6	Alexander Benda	13.566	11.400		13.866	13.266	13.200	235.325
6	Vinzenz Höck			14.266			13.033	235.325
6	Severin Kranzlmüller	13.166		12.500	13.166	13.666	13.066	235.325
6	Ricardo Rudy	13.233	13.466		13.833			235.325

=== Floor ===
Turkey's Abdelrahman Elgamal sustained an injury prior to the team final and was replaced by first alternate Alexander Benda of Austria.

Oldest and youngest competitors

	Name	Country	Date of birth	Age
Youngest	Krisztofer Mészáros	Hungary	September 5, 2001	19 years, 3 months and 8 days
Oldest	Petro Pakhniuk	Ukraine	November 26, 1991	29 years and 17 days

Position	Gymnast	D Score	E Score	Penalty	Total
1st place, gold medalist(s)	(Israel) Artem Dolgopyat	6.4	8.600		15.000
2nd place, silver medalist(s)	(Croatia) Aurel Benović	6.3	8.300		14.600
3rd place, bronze medalist(s)	(Belarus) Yahor Sharamkou	6.3	8.333	0.100	14.533
4	(Turkey) Ahmet Önder	5.6	8.466		14.066
5	(Ukraine) Vladyslav Hryko	5.8	8.266	0.100	13.966
6	(Hungary) Krisztofer Mészáros	5.9	8.066		13.966
7	(Austria) Alexander Benda	5.3	7.866		13.166
8	(Ukraine) Petro Pakhniuk	5.7	6.233		11.933

=== Pommel horse ===
Matvei Petrov won Albania's first-ever medal at the European Championships.

Oldest and youngest competitors

	Name	Country	Date of birth	Age
Youngest	Krisztofer Mészáros	Hungary	September 5, 2001	19 years, 3 months and 8 days
Oldest	Robert Seligman	Croatia	May 1, 1986	34 years, 7 months and 12 days

Position	Gymnast	D Score	E Score	Penalty	Total
1st place, gold medalist(s)	(Albania) Matvei Petrov	6.0	8.566		14.566
2nd place, silver medalist(s)	(Croatia) Filip Ude	5.6	8.933		14.533
3rd place, bronze medalist(s)	(Turkey) Ferhat Arıcan	5.8	8.633		14.433
4	(Croatia) Robert Seligman	5.8	8.566		14.366
5	(Ukraine) Yevhen Yudenkov	5.6	8.666		14.266
6	(Hungary) Krisztofer Mészáros	5.5	8.666		14.166
7	(Ukraine) Petro Pakhniuk	5.9	8.266		14.166
8	(Hungary) Dávid Vecsernyés	5.3	8.300		13.600

=== Rings ===
Oldest and youngest competitors

	Name	Country	Date of birth	Age
Youngest	Răzvan-Denis Marc	Romania	August 17, 2001	19 years, 3 months and 26 days
Oldest	Igor Radivilov	Ukraine	October 19, 1992	28 years, 1 month and 24 days

Position	Gymnast	D Score	E Score	Penalty	Total
1st place, gold medalist(s)	(Turkey) İbrahim Çolak	6.0	9.000		15.000
2nd place, silver medalist(s)	(Austria) Vinzenz Höck	6.1	8.700		14.800
3rd place, bronze medalist(s)	(Ukraine) Igor Radivilov	6.0	8.766		14.766
4	(Turkey) Abdelrahman Elgamal	6.1	8.333		14.433
5	(Ukraine) Yevhen Yudenkov	5.7	8.100		13.800
6	(Bulgaria) Hristos Marinov	5.2	8.333		13.533
7	(Finland) Joonas Kukkonen	5.5	7.833		13.333
8	(Romania) Răzvan-Denis Marc	5.1	8.066		13.166

=== Vault ===
Oldest and youngest competitors

	Name	Country	Date of birth	Age
Youngest	Ondřej Kalný	Czech Republic	April 5, 2001	19 years, 8 months and 8 days
Oldest	Marian Drăgulescu	Romania	December 18, 1980	39 years, 11 months and 25 days

Position	Gymnast	Vault 1				Vault 2				Total
Position	Gymnast	D Score	E Score	Pen.	Score 1	D Score	E Score	Pen.	Score 2	Total
1st place, gold medalist(s)	(Ukraine) Igor Radivilov	6.0	8.933		14.933	5.6	8.933		14.533	14.733
2nd place, silver medalist(s)	(Belarus) Yahor Sharamkou	5.2	9.400		14.600	5.6	9.200		14.800	14.700
3rd place, bronze medalist(s)	(Israel) Artem Dolgopyat	5.6	9.166		14.766	5.2	9.000		14.200	14.483
4	(Romania) Marian Drăgulescu	5.0	8.666		13.666	5.6	9.300		14.900	14.283
5	(Czech Republic) Ondřej Kalný	5.2	9.033		14.233	4.8	9.366		14.166	14.199
6	(Turkey) Ferhat Arıcan	5.2	9.033		14.233	5.2	8.866		14.066	14.149
7	(Bulgaria) Dimitar Dimitrov	5.2	9.166		14.366	4.8	9.000		13.800	14.083
8	(Turkey) Ahmet Önder	5.2	9.066		14.266	5.2	8.000		13.200	13.733

=== Parallel bars ===
Oldest and youngest competitors

	Name	Country	Date of birth	Age
Youngest	Benedek Tomcsányi	Hungary	October 31, 2001	19 years, 1 month and 13 days
Oldest	Petro Pakhniuk	Ukraine	November 26, 1991	29 years and 17 days

Position	Gymnast	D Score	E Score	Penalty	Total
1st place, gold medalist(s)	(Turkey) Ferhat Arıcan	6.6	8.500		15.100
2nd place, silver medalist(s)	(Ukraine) Petro Pakhniuk	6.2	8.566		14.766
3rd place, bronze medalist(s)	(Lithuania) Robert Tvorogal	5.9	8.600		14.500
4	(Turkey) İbrahim Çolak	5.6	8.766		14.366
5	(Hungary) Krisztofer Mészáros	5.5	8.600		14.100
6	(Austria) Severin Kranzlmüller	5.0	8.600		13.600
7	(Hungary) Benedek Tomcsányi	5.3	8.200		13.500
8	(Bulgaria) David Huddleston	5.5	7.366		12.866

=== Horizontal bar ===
Oldest and youngest competitors

	Name	Country	Date of birth	Age
Youngest	Abdelrahman Elgamal	Turkey	February 21, 1999	21 years, 9 months and 22 days
Oldest	Dávid Vecsernyés	Hungary	March 22, 1991	29 years, 8 months and 21 days

Position	Gymnast	D Score	E Score	Penalty	Total
1st place, gold medalist(s)	(Lithuania) Robert Tvorogal	6.4	8.400		14.800
2nd place, silver medalist(s)	(Croatia) Tin Srbić	6.2	8.400		14.600
3rd place, bronze medalist(s)	(Israel) Alexander Myakinin	5.9	8.300		14.200
4	(Turkey) Abdelrahman Elgamal	5.9	8.266		14.166
5	(Hungary) Dávid Vecsernyés	5.8	8.233		14.033
6	(Bulgaria) Yordan Aleksandrov	5.4	8.300		13.700
7	(Ukraine) Petro Pakhniuk	4.8	8.533		13.333
8	(Turkey) Ahmet Önder	5.0	7.100		12.100

== Junior results ==
=== Team competition ===
Rank	Team	Floor (gymnastics)	Pommel horse	Rings (gymnastics)	Vault (gymnastics)	Parallel bars	Horizontal bar	Total
1st place, gold medalist(s)	Ukraine	40.499 (1)	40.732 (1)	38.699 (1)	40.299 (5)	40.299 (1)	38.600 (1)	239.128
1st place, gold medalist(s)	Volodymyr Kostiuk	14.133	12.233	13.133	14.133	12.866	12.800	239.128
1st place, gold medalist(s)	Illia Kovtun	12.733	13.600	13.033	13.200	14.233	12.800	239.128
1st place, gold medalist(s)	Mykyta Melnykov		13.366	11.300	12.966	13.100	13.000	239.128
1st place, gold medalist(s)	Ivan Sevruk	13.233						239.128
1st place, gold medalist(s)	Radomyr Stelmakh	13.133	13.766	12.533	12.966	12.966	10.666	239.128
2nd place, silver medalist(s)	Hungary	39.366 (3)	37.499 (3)	37.432 (2)	42.433 (2)	38.699 (3)	37.065 (2)	232.494
2nd place, silver medalist(s)	Krisztián Balázs	13.033	12.833	12.666	13.733	13.766	13.166	232.494
2nd place, silver medalist(s)	Ádám Dobrovitz	10.433		12.533	13.933	11.333		232.494
2nd place, silver medalist(s)	Márton Kovács		12.200				11.533	232.494
2nd place, silver medalist(s)	Botond Molnár	13.233	12.466	12.233	14.000	12.833	11.933	232.494
2nd place, silver medalist(s)	Szilárd Závory	13.100	11.533	11.033	14.500	12.100	11.966	232.494
3rd place, bronze medalist(s)	Bulgaria	39.766 (2)	36.166 (6)	36.432 (5)	40.432 (4)	39.266 (2)	36.299 (3)	228.361
3rd place, bronze medalist(s)	Zdravko Dobrev	13.300	12.133	11.700	12.666	12.900	10.933	228.361
3rd place, bronze medalist(s)	Rayan Radkov		11.500					228.361
3rd place, bronze medalist(s)	Daniel Trifonov	12.400		11.733	13.100	11.566	12.166	228.361
3rd place, bronze medalist(s)	Teodor Trifonov	13.033	12.533	12.166	13.466	13.133	11.900	228.361
3rd place, bronze medalist(s)	Bozhidar Zlatonov	13.433	9.700	12.533	13.866	13.233	12.233	228.361
4	Romania	35.932 (11)	36.299 (5)	36.699 (3)	42.632 (1)	37.665 (4)	35.966 (4)	225.193
4	Nicolae Ionel Bera	10.600			13.933	11.466	12.066	225.193
4	Gabriel Burtănete	12.400	12.500	12.800	14.433	12.266	12.000	225.193
4	Robert Burtănete	11.066	12.633	11.733	14.266	13.133	11.800	225.193
4	Raul Gabriel Șoica	12.466	11.166	12.166	13.100	12.266	11.900	225.193
5	Lithuania	38.466 (4)	38.532 (2)	35.032 (9)	36.999 (11)	35.900 (9)	34.233 (10)	219.162
5	Gytis Chasažyrovas	13.500	13.133	12.366	12.566	12.500	11.900	219.162
5	Matas Imbrasas	11.366	12.366	10.966	12.133	11.500	11.100	219.162
5	Daniil Korobkov	12.633		11.700	12.300	11.900	11.233	219.162
5	Titas Kuzmickas	12.333	11.400	10.766	12.100	11.166	10.833	219.162
5	Kristijonas Padegimas		13.033					219.162
6	Latvia	36.933 (7)	35.065 (8)	35.233 (8)	38.732 (7)	36.065 (8)	35.233 (5)	217.261
6	Edgars Čudovskis	11.900	10.966	11.333	12.666	10.933	9.933	217.261
6	Dmitrijs Mickevičs	11.533	12.133	10.366	11.066	11.666	11.800	217.261
6	Ričards Plate	12.633	11.966	12.300	13.066	12.433	12.233	217.261
6	Edvīns Rodevičs	12.400	8.666	11.600	13.000	11.966	11.200	217.261
7	Israel	36.132 (10)	37.033 (4)	32.199 (11)	37.533 (8)	37.532 (5)	34.999 (6)	215.428
7	Dmytro Dotsenko	12.333	11.700	9.100	10.766	13.066	11.866	215.428
7	Eyal Indig	10.966	13.100	10.033	13.000	12.500	11.700	215.428
7	Eliran Ioscovich	12.666	12.233	11.433	12.800	11.966	11.433	215.428
7	Ron Snir	11.133	9.300	10.733	11.733	10.100		215.428
8	Turkey	36.832 (8)	35.366 (7)	36.466 (4)	37.365 (10)	34.099 (10)	34.833 (7)	214.961
8	Tamer Aguş		11.800					214.961
8	Mert Efe Kılıçer	11.766	12.300	12.000	12.966	13.100	12.500	214.961
8	Yusuf Tokcan	11.900		12.000	10.733	8.466	10.000	214.961
8	Bora Tarhan	13.166	11.266	12.466	13.666	12.533	12.333	214.961
9	Slovenia	37.033 (6)	34.398 (9)	34.932 (10)	37.498 (9)	36.466 (6)	34.532 (9)	214.859
9	Kevin George Buckley	12.033	11.766	12.100	12.466	11.700	11.266	214.859
9	Anže Hribar	12.700	10.333	11.466	12.766	12.466	11.966	214.859
9	Tim Jambrisko		10.666	10.900	12.266	12.000	11.300	214.859
9	Gregor Raković	11.533	11.966	11.366		12.000		214.859
9	Gregor Turk	12.300					11.133	214.859
10	Czech Republic	36.266 (9)	30.199 (10)	35.532 (7)	40.033 (6)	36.200 (7)	34.766 (8)	212.996
10	Daniel Bago	11.400		10.466	13.300		11.600	212.996
10	Miroslav Durak		8.866	12.066		11.800	11.466	212.996
10	Daniel David Kaplan	11.033	8.133		13.133	11.900		212.996
10	František Marghold	12.233	9.933	12.000	13.600	11.333	11.333	212.996
10	Vojtech Šácha	12.633	11.400	11.466	12.333	12.500	11.700	212.996
11	Finland	37.299 (5)	29.633 (11)	36.298 (6)	40.766 (3)	27.532 (11)	33.766 (11)	205.294
11	Akseli Karsikas	12.666	7.500	12.266	13.966	11.533	10.600	205.294
11	Niila Sinivuori	12.200	10.633	12.066	13.900	4.033	11.933	205.294
11	Antti Varjolaakso	12.433	11.500	11.966	12.900	11.966	11.233	205.294

=== Individual all-around ===
Fifth-place qualifier Gabriel Burtănete of Romania was replaced by teammate Raul Gabriel Șoica, who had previously been affected by the two-per-country rule.

Position	Gymnast	Floor (gymnastics)	Pommel horse	Rings (gymnastics)	Vault (gymnastics)	Parallel bars	Horizontal bar	Total
1st place, gold medalist(s)	(Ukraine) Illia Kovtun	13.733	13.600	13.333	14.133	13.600	13.066	81.465
2nd place, silver medalist(s)	(Ukraine) Volodymyr Kostiuk	14.000	13.266	13.266	13.000	13.733	12.933	80.198
3rd place, bronze medalist(s)	(Hungary) Krisztián Balázs	13.300	11.766	12.600	13.500	13.900	13.500	78.566
4	(Romania) Robert Burtănete	13.400	12.633	12.933	14.066	12.333	11.666	77.031
5	(Bulgaria) Teodor Trifonov	13.233	12.500	11.866	13.600	13.200	12.300	76.699
6	(Israel) Eyal Indig	12.900	13.400	12.100	13.300	12.600	12.166	76.466
7	(Lithuania) Gytis Chasažyrovas	13.533	12.866	12.233	12.533	12.833	12.133	76.131
8	(Turkey) Bora Tarhan	12.666	12.100	12.733	13.566	12.733	12.000	75.798
9	(Austria) Askhab Matiev	13.133	12.500	12.633	12.933	12.333	12.233	75.765
10	(Turkey) Mert Efe Kılıçer	11.900	12.500	12.033	13.200	13.000	12.633	75.266
11	(Bulgaria) Bozhidar Zlatanov	13.033	10.300	12.700	13.700	12.933	12.466	75.132
12	(Hungary) Botond Molnár	12.933	11.266	12.400	13.833	12.500	12.066	74.998
13	(Slovakia) Matej Nemčovič	12.600	12.033	12.233	12.666	12.266	11.266	73.064
14	(Czech Republic) Vojtech Šácha	11.633	12.100	12.300	11.900	12.966	12.133	73.032
15	(Luxembourg) Quentin Brandenburger	12.666	11.166	11.866	13.466	12.100	11.466	72.730
16	(Romania) Raul Gabriel Șoica	12.433	11.233	12.633	13.133	11.300	11.900	72.632
17	(Iceland) Jónas Ingi Þórisson	12.866	10.666	11.766	13.566	12.100	11.666	72.630
18	(Finland) Antti Varjolaakso	12.000	11.166	12.133	13.100	12.066	11.800	72.265
19	(Latvia) Ričards Plate	12.700	11.600	10.966	13.066	11.400	12.433	72.165
20	(Israel) Eliran Ioscovich	12.633	12.433	10.800	12.833	11.166	11.900	71.765
21	(Slovenia) Kevin George Buckley	12.266	12.500	10.933	12.433	11.800	11.600	71.532
22	(Slovenia) Anže Hribar	13.433	10.300	11.833	12.900	12.300	10.500	71.266
23	(Slovakia) Oliver Kasala	12.366	9.566	11.833	13.100	12.433	11.100	70.398
24	(Czech Republic) František Marghold	11.866	9.700	11.833	12.933	11.933	10.233	68.498

=== Floor ===
Position	Gymnast	D Score	E Score	Penalty	Total
1st place, gold medalist(s)	(Lithuania) Gytis Chasažyrovas	5.0	8.733		13.733
2nd place, silver medalist(s)	(Ukraine) Ivan Sevruk	4.6	8.866		13.466
3rd place, bronze medalist(s)	(Hungary) Botond Molnár	4.9	8.500		13.400
4	(Ukraine) Volodymyr Kostiuk	5.3	8.633	0.600	13.333
5	(Turkey) Bora Tarhan	4.6	8.666	0.200	13.066
6	(Bulgaria) Bozhidar Zlatanov	4.7	8.266		12.966
7	(Austria) Askhab Matiev	4.5	8.300		12.800
8	(Bulgaria) Zdravko Dobrev	4.6	7.033		11.633

=== Pommel horse ===
Position	Gymnast	D Score	E Score	Penalty	Total
1st place, gold medalist(s)	(Ukraine) Illia Kovtun	5.5	8.733		14.233
2nd place, silver medalist(s)	(Israel) Eyal Indig	4.7	8.666		13.366
2nd place, silver medalist(s)	(Lithuania) Gytis Chasažyrovas	4.7	8.666		13.366
4	(Croatia) Mateo Žugec	4.5	8.600		13.100
5	(Croatia) Liam Rabić	4.3	8.766		13.066
6	(Ukraine) Radomyr Stelmakh	5.1	7.466		12.566
7	(Hungary) Krisztián Balázs	4.3	8.233		12.533
8	(Lithuania) Kristijonas Padegimas	4.8	7.266		12.066

=== Rings ===
Position	Gymnast	D Score	E Score	Penalty	Total
1st place, gold medalist(s)	(Ukraine) Illia Kovtun	4.5	8.766		13.266
2nd place, silver medalist(s)	(Ukraine) Volodymyr Kostiuk	4.3	8.866		13.166
3rd place, bronze medalist(s)	(Turkey) Bora Tarhan	4.3	8.700		13.000
4	(Romania) Gabriel Burtănete	4.3	8.666		12.966
5	(Hungary) Ádám Dobrovitz	4.5	8.466		12.966
6	(Hungary) Krisztián Balázs	4.6	8.233		12.833
7	(Bulgaria) Bozhidar Zlatanov	4.1	8.633		12.733
8	(Lithuania) Gytis Chasažyrovas	4.2	8.400		12.600

=== Vault ===
Position	Gymnast	Vault 1				Vault 2				Total
Position	Gymnast	D Score	E Score	Pen.	Score 1	D Score	E Score	Pen.	Score 2	Total
1st place, gold medalist(s)	(Romania) Gabriel Burtănete	5.2	9.066		14.266	5.2	9.100		14.300	14.283
2nd place, silver medalist(s)	(Ukraine) Illia Kovtun	5.2	8.966		14.066	4.8	9.200		14.000	14.033
3rd place, bronze medalist(s)	(Turkey) Bora Tarhan	5.2	8.800		14.000	5.2	8.933		14.033	14.016
4	(Romania) Robert Burtănete	5.2	8.733		13.933	4.8	9.066		13.866	13.899
5	(Hungary) Szilárd Závory	5.2	9.266		14.466	4.0	9.000		13.000	13.733
6	(Finland) Akseli Karsikas	4.8	8.800		13.600	5.2	8.666		13.766	13.683
7	(Iceland) Jónas Ingi Þórisson	4.8	8.966		13.766	5.2	7.766		12.966	13.366
8	(Ukraine) Volodymyr Kostiuk	5.2	8.366		13.566	4.0	9.133		13.133	13.349

=== Parallel bars ===
Position	Gymnast	D Score	E Score	Penalty	Total
1st place, gold medalist(s)	(Ukraine) Illia Kovtun	5.7	8.900		14.600
2nd place, silver medalist(s)	(Ukraine) Mykyta Melnykov	5.2	8.466		13.666
3rd place, bronze medalist(s)	(Turkey) Mert Efe Kılıçer	4.5	8.766		13.266
4	(Hungary) Krisztián Balázs	4.9	8.266		13.166
5	(Bulgaria) Teodor Trifonov	4.5	8.433		12.933
6	(Bulgaria) Bozhidar Zlatanov	4.7	8.233		12.933
7	(Israel) Dmytro Dotsenko	4.2	8.266		12.466
8	(Romania) Robert Burtănete	4.2	7.633		11.833

=== Horizontal bar ===
Position	Gymnast	D Score	E Score	Penalty	Total
1st place, gold medalist(s)	(Hungary) Krisztián Balázs	5.0	8.366		13.366
2nd place, silver medalist(s)	(Turkey) Mert Efe Kılıçer	4.1	8.833		12.933
3rd place, bronze medalist(s)	(Ukraine) Volodymyr Kostiuk	4.4	8.500		12.900
4	(Latvia) Ričards Plate	4.0	8.666		12.666
5	(Bulgaria) Bozhidar Zlatanov	4.1	8.400		12.500
6	(Bulgaria) Daniel Trifonov	4.0	8.400		12.400
7	(Ukraine) Illia Kovtun	5.0	7.166		12.166
8	(Turkey) Bora Tarhan	3.5	7.600		11.100

== Qualification results ==
=== Senior ===
==== Team competition ====
Due to the smaller competition roster, the team final was reduced to six teams.

Rank	Team	Floor (gymnastics)	Pommel horse	Rings (gymnastics)	Vault (gymnastics)	Parallel bars	Horizontal bar	Total	Qual.
1	Turkey	41.765 (2)	38.966 (5)	43.066 (1)	43.365 (1)	43.166 (1)	41.266 (1)	251.594	Q
1	Ferhat Arıcan	13.366	13.833		14.066	15.333		251.594	Q
1	İbrahim Çolak			14.633		14.300		251.594	Q
1	Abdelrahman Elgamal	14.366	12.100	14.500	14.933	13.533	13.800	251.594	Q
1	Ahmet Önder	14.033	13.033	13.933	14.366		14.000	251.594	Q
1	Ümit Şamiloğlu						13.466	251.594	Q
2	Ukraine	42.366 (1)	41.632 (1)	42.066 (2)	43.099 (2)	41.600 (2)	39.699 (3)	250.462	Q
2	Vladyslav Hryko	14.100		13.433		13.600	13.266	250.462	Q
2	Petro Pakhniuk	14.466	14.066		14.433	14.600	13.300	250.462	Q
2	Igor Radivilov			14.600	14.766			250.462	Q
2	Roman Vashchenko		13.633					250.462	Q
2	Yevgen Yudenkov	13.800	13.933	14.033	13.900	13.400	13.133	250.462	Q
3	Hungary	40.132 (6)	40.499 (3)	39.400 (6)	41.266 (6)	41.032 (4)	39.632 (4)	241.961	Q
3	Szabolcs Bátori	12.733			13.600			241.961	Q
3	Balázs Kiss	13.066		13.100				241.961	Q
3	Krisztofer Mészáros	14.333	14.066	13.100	14.000	13.966	12.966	241.961	Q
3	Benedek Tomcsányi		13.200	13.200	13.666	13.666	12.533	241.961	Q
3	Dávid Vecsernyés		13.233			13.400	14.133	241.961	Q
4	Austria	40.233 (5)	39.065 (4)	40.265 (4)	41.299 (5)	39.066 (5)	39.298 (5)	239.226	Q
4	Manuel Arnold		13.066	13.166			12.966	239.226	Q
4	Alexander Benda	13.933	12.866		13.733	12.700	13.266	239.226	Q
4	Vinzenz Höck			14.633	13.800		13.066	239.226	Q
4	Severin Kranzlmüller	13.200		12.466		13.700		239.226	Q
4	Ricardo Rudy	13.100	13.133		13.766	12.666		239.226	Q
5	Israel	41.632 (3)	38.332 (6)	37.233 (8)	39.732 (9)	38.699 (6)	40.132 (2)	235.760	Q
5	Artem Dolgopyat	13.400	12.833		14.400	12.966	12.966	235.760	Q
5	Ilan Korchak		12.333	12.433	12.066			235.760	Q
5	Andrey Medvedev	12.866		12.700	13.266			235.760	Q
5	Alexander Myakinin			12.100		12.833	14.033	235.760	Q
5	Alexander Shatilov	13.833	13.166			12.900	13.133	235.760	Q
6	Bulgaria	40.099 (7)	31.999 (9)	39.432 (5)	41.599 (4)	41.166 (3)	38.099 (9)	232.394	Q
6	Yordan Aleksandrov	13.400	11.933	12.766	13.433	13.633	13.600	232.394	Q
6	Dimitar Dimitrov	13.733			14.400			232.394	Q
6	David Huddleston	12.966	12.000	12.933		14.333	12.066	232.394	Q
6	Hristos Marinov			13.733		13.200		232.394	Q
6	Radoslav Rachev		8.066		13.766		12.433	232.394	Q
7	Czech Republic	41.065 (4)	36.199 (7)	35.732 (9)	42.432 (3)	38.599 (8)	38.133 (8)	232.160	R1
7	František Černý		11.900	12.133				232.160	R1
7	David Jessen	13.566	12.066		14.166	13.233	13.300	232.160	R1
7	Ondřej Kalný	13.633			14.400			232.160	R1
7	Daniel Ponížil	13.866		11.933	13.866	11.933	12.000	232.160	R1
7	Daniel Radovesnický		12.233	11.666		13.433	12.833	232.160	R1
8	Lithuania	39.333 (8)	35.032 (8)	37.332 (7)	40.633 (8)	38.632 (7)	38.232 (7)	229.194	R2
8	Tomas Kuzmickas	13.433	12.733	12.766	13.800	12.766	13.100	229.194	R2
8	Ernestas Liaškinas	12.100	10.166	11.233	12.933	11.733	11.166	229.194	R2
8	Robert Tvorogal	13.800	12.133	13.333	13.900	14.133	13.966	229.194	R2

==== Floor ====
Rank	Gymnast	D Score	E Score	Pen.	Total	Qual.
1	(Belarus) Yahor Sharamkou	6.3	8.733		15.033	Q
2	(Israel) Artem Dolgopyat	6.4	8.533		14.933	Q
3	(Ukraine) Petro Pakhniuk	5.9	8.566		14.466	Q
4	(Turkey) Abdelrahman Elgamal	6.0	8.366		14.366	Q
5	(Hungary) Krisztofer Mészáros	5.9	8.433		14.333	Q
6	(Croatia) Aurel Benović	6.3	8.033		14.333	Q
7	(Ukraine) Vladyslav Hryko	5.8	8.400	0.100	14.100	Q
8	(Turkey) Ahmet Önder	5.6	8.433		14.033	Q
9	(Austria) Alexander Benda	5.3	8.633		13.933	R1
10	(Czech Republic) Daniel Ponížil	5.3	8.566		13.866	R2
11	(Israel) Alexander Shatilov	5.6	8.233		13.833	R3

==== Pommel horse ====
Rank	Gymnast	D Score	E Score	Pen.	Total	Qual.
1	(Croatia) Robert Seligman	5.6	8.700		14.300	Q
2	(Hungary) Krisztofer Mészáros	5.5	8.566		14.066	Q
3	(Ukraine) Petro Pakhniuk	5.9	8.166		14.066	Q
4	(Ukraine) Yevgen Yudenkov	5.6	8.333		13.933	Q
5	(Turkey) Ferhat Arıcan	5.8	8.033		13.833	Q
6	(Ukraine) Roman Vashchenko	5.7	7.933		13.633	–
7	(Albania) Matvei Petrov	5.2	8.366		13.566	Q
8	(Croatia) Filip Ude	5.7	7.733		13.433	Q
9	(Hungary) Dávid Vecsernyés	5.3	7.933		13.233	Q
10	(Hungary) Benedek Tomcsányi	5.0	8.200		13.200	–
11	(Israel) Alexander Shatilov	4.8	8.366		13.166	R1
12	(Austria) Ricardo Rudy	4.5	8.633		13.133	R2
13	(Austria) Manuel Arnold	5.0	8.066		13.066	R3

==== Rings ====
Rank	Gymnast	D Score	E Score	Pen.	Total	Qual.
1	(Turkey) İbrahim Çolak	5.8	8.833		14.633	Q
2	(Austria) Vinzenz Höck	6.1	8.533		14.633	Q
3	(Ukraine) Igor Radivilov	6.0	8.600		14.600	Q
4	(Turkey) Abdelrahman Elgamal	6.1	8.400		14.500	Q
5	(Ukraine) Yevgen Yudenkov	5.7	8.333		14.033	Q
6	(Turkey) Ahmet Önder	5.4	8.533		13.933	–
7	(Bulgaria) Hristos Marinov	5.2	8.533		13.733	Q
8	(Romania) Răzvan-Denis Marc	5.1	8.533		13.633	Q
9	(Finland) Joonas Kukkonen	5.6	8.033		13.633	Q
10	(Romania) Andrei Ioan Groza	5.1	8.433		13.533	R1
11	(Romania) Vlad Bogdan Cotuna	5.2	8.233		13.433	–
12	(Ukraine) Vladyslav Hryko	5.3	8.133		13.433	–
13	(Lithuania) Robert Tvorogal	4.5	8.833		13.333	R2
14	(Hungary) Benedek Tomcsányi	4.8	8.400		13.200	R3

==== Vault ====
Rank	Gymnast	Vault 1				Vault 2				Total	Qual.
Rank	Gymnast	D Score	E Score	Pen.	Score 1	D Score	E Score	Pen.	Score 2	Total	Qual.
1	(Ukraine) Igor Radivilov	5.6	9.166		14.766	5.6	8.933		14.533	14.649	Q
2	(Belarus) Yahor Sharamkou	5.2	9.133		14.333	5.6	8.900		14.500	14.416	Q
3	(Israel) Artem Dolgopyat	5.2	9.200		14.400	5.2	9.100		14.300	14.350	Q
4	(Turkey) Ahmet Önder	5.2	9.166		14.366	5.2	9.100		14.300	14.333	Q
5	(Romania) Marian Drăgulescu	5.0	9.000		14.000	5.6	8.966		14.566	14.283	Q
6	(Bulgaria) Dimitar Dimitrov	5.2	9.200		14.400	4.8	9.366		14.166	14.283	Q
7	(Turkey) Abdelrahman Elgamal	5.6	9.333		14.933	5.6	7.900		13.500	14.216	Q
8	(Turkey) Ferhat Arıcan	5.2	8.966	0.100	14.066	5.2	8.933		14.133	14.099	–
9	(Czech Republic) Ondřej Kalný	5.2	9.200		14.400	4.8	8.866		13.666	14.033	Q
10	(Iceland) Valgarð Reinhardsson	5.2	8.766		13.966	5.2	8.900		14.100	14.033	R1
11	(Israel) Andrey Medvedev	5.6	7.966	0.300	13.266	5.6	9.133		14.733	13.999	R2
12	(Czech Republic) Daniel Ponížil	4.8	9.066		13.866	4.0	9.200		13.200	13.533	R3

==== Parallel bars ====
Rank	Gymnast	D Score	E Score	Pen.	Total	Qual.
1	(Turkey) Ferhat Arıcan	6.6	8.733		15.333	Q
2	(Ukraine) Petro Pakhniuk	6.2	8.400		14.600	Q
3	(Bulgaria) David Huddleston	5.9	8.433		14.333	Q
4	(Turkey) İbrahim Çolak	5.6	8.700		14.300	Q
5	(Lithuania) Robert Tvorogal	5.5	8.633		14.133	Q
6	(Hungary) Krisztofer Mészáros	5.5	8.466		13.966	Q
7	(Austria) Severin Kranzlmüller	5.0	8.700		13.700	Q
8	(Hungary) Benedek Tomcsányi	5.0	8.666		13.666	Q
9	(Bulgaria) Yordan Aleksandrov	5.5	8.133		13.633	R1
10	(Ukraine) Vladyslav Hryko	5.7	7.900		13.600	R2
11	(Turkey) Abdelrahman Elgamal	5.8	7.733		13.533	–
12	(Czech Republic) Daniel Radovesnický	5.0	8.433		13.433	R3

==== Horizontal bar ====
Rank	Gymnast	D Score	E Score	Pen.	Total	Qual.
1	(Croatia) Tin Srbić	5.8	8.533		14.333	Q
2	(Hungary) Dávid Vecsernyés	5.8	8.333		14.133	Q
3	(Israel) Alexander Myakinin	5.9	8.133		14.033	Q
4	(Turkey) Ahmet Önder	6.0	8.000		14.000	Q
5	(Lithuania) Robert Tvorogal	5.5	8.466		13.966	Q
6	(Turkey) Abdelrahman Elgamal	6.0	7.800		13.800	Q
7	(Bulgaria) Yordan Aleksandrov	5.4	8.200		13.600	Q
8	(Turkey) Ümit Şamiloğlu	5.5	7.966		13.466	–
9	(Ukraine) Petro Pakhniuk	4.8	8.500		13.300	Q
10	(Czech Republic) David Jessen	4.9	8.400		13.300	R1
11	(Romania) Răzvan-Denis Marc	4.9	8.400		13.300	R2
12	(Ukraine) Vladyslav Hryko	5.4	7.866		13.300	R3

=== Junior ===
==== Individual all-around ====
Rank	Gymnast	Floor (gymnastics)	Pommel horse	Rings (gymnastics)	Vault (gymnastics)	Parallel bars	Horizontal bar	Total	Qual.
1	(Ukraine) Illia Kovtun	12.733	13.600	13.033	13.200	14.233	12.800	79.599	Q
2	(Ukraine) Volodymyr Kostiuk	14.133	12.233	13.133	14.133	12.866	12.800	79.298	Q
3	(Hungary) Krisztián Balázs	13.033	12.833	12.666	13.733	13.766	13.166	79.197	Q
4	(Hungary) Botond Molnár	13.233	12.466	12.233	14.000	12.833	11.933	76.698	Q
5	(Romania) Gabriel Burtănete	12.400	12.500	12.800	14.433	12.266	12.000	76.399	Q
6	(Bulgaria) Teodor Trifonov	13.033	12.533	12.166	13.466	13.133	11.900	76.231	Q
7	(Ukraine) Radomyr Stelmakh	13.133	13.766	12.533	12.966	12.966	10.666	76.030	–
8	(Lithuania) Gytis Chasažyrovas	13.500	13.133	12.366	12.566	12.500	11.900	75.965	Q
9	(Turkey) Bora Tarhan	13.166	11.266	12.466	13.666	12.533	12.333	75.430	Q
10	(Bulgaria) Bozhidar Zlatanov	13.433	9.700	12.533	13.866	13.233	12.233	74.998	Q
11	(Austria) Askhab Matiev	13.166	12.466	11.766	13.066	12.366	12.066	74.896	Q
12	(Turkey) Mert Efe Kılıçer	11.766	12.300	12.000	12.966	13.100	12.500	74.632	Q
13	(Romania) Robert Burtănete	11.066	12.633	11.733	14.266	13.133	11.800	74.631	Q
14	(Latvia) Ričards Plate	12.633	11.966	12.300	13.066	12.433	12.233	74.631	Q
15	(Hungary) Szilárd Závory	13.100	11.533	11.033	14.500	12.100	11.966	74.232	–
16	(Bulgaria) Zdravko Dobrev	13.300	12.133	11.700	12.666	12.900	10.933	73.632	–
17	(Romania) Raul Gabriel Șoica	12.466	11.166	12.166	13.100	12.266	11.900	73.064	–
18	(Israel) Eliran Ioscovich	12.666	12.233	11.433	12.800	11.966	11.433	72.531	Q
19	(Iceland) Jónas Ingi Þórisson	13.133	10.400	10.800	13.833	12.566	11.633	72.365	Q
20	(Slovakia) Matej Nemčovič	12.333	11.333	11.900	12.766	12.400	11.300	72.032	Q
21	(Czech Republic) Vojtech Šácha	12.633	11.400	11.466	12.333	12.500	11.700	72.032	Q
22	(Finland) Antti Varjolaakso	12.433	11.500	11.966	12.900	11.966	11.233	71.998	Q
23	(Slovenia) Anže Hribar	12.700	10.333	11.466	12.766	12.466	11.966	71.697	Q
24	(Slovenia) Kevin George Buckley	12.033	11.766	12.100	12.466	11.700	11.266	71.331	Q
25	(Israel) Eyal Indig	10.966	13.100	10.033	13.000	12.500	11.700	71.299	Q
26	(Czech Republic) František Marghold	12.233	9.933	12.000	13.600	11.333	11.333	70.432	Q
27	(Luxembourg) Quentin Brandenburger	12.333	9.700	11.400	13.666	12.100	11.133	70.332	Q
28	(Slovakia) Oliver Kasala	11.166	11.466	11.666	12.866	11.366	10.966	69.496	Q
29	(Lithuania) Matas Imbrasas	11.366	12.366	10.966	12.133	11.500	11.100	69.431	R1
30	(Latvia) Edvīns Rodevičs	12.400	8.666	11.600	13.000	11.966	11.200	68.832	R2
31	(Israel) Dmytro Dotsenko	12.333	11.700	9.100	10.766	13.066	11.866	68.831	–
32	(Lithuania) Titas Kuzmickas	12.333	11.400	10.766	12.100	11.166	10.833	68.598	–
33	(Latvia) Dmitrijs Mickevičs	11.533	12.133	10.366	11.066	11.666	11.800	68.564	–
34	(Finland) Akseli Karsikas	12.666	7.500	12.266	13.966	11.533	10.600	68.531	R3

==== Floor ====
Rank	Gymnast	D Score	E Score	Pen.	Total	Qual.
1	(Ukraine) Volodymyr Kostiuk	5.3	8.833		14.133	Q
2	(Lithuania) Gytis Chasažyrovas	5.0	8.500		13.500	Q
3	(Bulgaria) Bozhidar Zlatanov	4.7	8.733		13.433	Q
4	(Bulgaria) Zdravko Dobrev	4.8	8.500		13.300	Q
5	(Ukraine) Ivan Sevruk	4.6	8.733	0.100	13.233	Q
6	(Hungary) Botond Molnár	4.9	8.333		13.233	Q
7	(Austria) Askhab Matiev	4.5	8.666		13.166	Q
8	(Turkey) Bora Tarhan	4.6	8.566		13.166	Q
9	(Ukraine) Radomyr Stelmakh	4.6	8.533		13.133	–
10	(Iceland) Jónas Ingi Þórisson	4.7	8.433		13.133	R1
11	(Hungary) Szilárd Závory	4.9	8.200		13.100	R2
12	(Hungary) Krisztián Balázs	4.7	8.333		13.033	–
13	(Bulgaria) Teodor Trifonov	4.9	8.133		13.033	–
14	(Ukraine) Illia Kovtun	5.0	7.733		12.733	–
15	(Slovenia) Anže Hribar	4.3	8.400		12.700	R3

==== Pommel horse ====
Rank	Gymnast	D Score	E Score	Pen.	Total	Qual.
1	(Ukraine) Radomyr Stelmakh	5.0	8.766		13.766	Q
2	(Ukraine) Illia Kovtun	5.0	8.600		13.600	Q
3	(Ukraine) Mykyta Melnykov	5.0	8.366		13.366	–
4	(Croatia) Mateo Žugec	4.5	8.700		13.200	Q
5	(Lithuania) Gytis Chasažyrovas	4.7	8.433		13.133	Q
6	(Croatia) Liam Rabić	4.3	8.800		13.100	Q
7	(Israel) Eyal Indig	4.7	8.400		13.100	Q
8	(Lithuania) Kristijonas Padegimas	4.6	8.433		13.033	Q
9	(Hungary) Krisztián Balázs	4.7	8.133		12.833	Q
10	(Romania) Robert Burtănete	4.3	8.333		12.633	R1
11	(Bulgaria) Teodor Trifonov	4.4	8.133		12.533	R2
12	(Romania) Gabriel Burtănete	4.1	8.400		12.500	R3

==== Rings ====
Rank	Gymnast	D Score	E Score	Pen.	Total	Qual.
1	(Ukraine) Volodymyr Kostiuk	4.3	8.833		13.133	Q
2	(Ukraine) Illia Kovtun	4.5	8.533		13.033	Q
3	(Romania) Gabriel Burtănete	4.3	8.500		12.800	Q
4	(Hungary) Krisztián Balázs	4.6	8.066		12.666	Q
5	(Bulgaria) Bozhidar Zlatanov	4.1	8.433		12.533	Q
6	(Ukraine) Radomyr Stelmakh	4.3	8.233		12.533	–
7	(Hungary) Ádám Dobrovitz	4.5	8.033		12.533	Q
8	(Turkey) Bora Tarhan	4.1	8.366		12.466	Q
9	(Lithuania) Gytis Chasažyrovas	4.2	8.166		12.366	Q
10	(Latvia) Ričards Plate	4.0	8.300		12.300	R1
11	(Finland) Akseli Karsikas	4.4	7.866		12.266	R2
12	(Hungary) Botond Molnár	4.4	7.833		12.233	–
13	(Romania) Raul Gabriel Șoica	4.1	8.066		12.166	R3

==== Vault ====
Rank	Gymnast	Vault 1				Vault 2				Total	Qual.
Rank	Gymnast	D Score	E Score	Pen.	Score 1	D Score	E Score	Pen.	Score 2	Total	Qual.
1	(Romania) Gabriel Burtănete	5.2	9.233		14.433	5.2	8.966		14.166	14.299	Q
2	(Romania) Robert Burtănete	5.2	9.066		14.266	4.8	9.100		13.900	14.083	Q
3	(Hungary) Szilárd Závory	5.2	9.300		14.500	4.0	9.200		13.200	13.850	Q
4	(Ukraine) Volodymyr Kostiuk	5.2	8.933		14.133	4.0	9.200		13.200	13.666	Q
5	(Ukraine) Illia Kovtun	5.2	8.000		13.200	4.8	9.100		13.900	13.550	Q
6	(Finland) Akseli Karsikas	4.8	9.166		13.966	4.0	8.966		12.966	13.466	Q
7	(Iceland) Jónas Ingi Þórisson	4.8	9.033		13.833	5.2	7.600		12.800	13.316	Q
8	(Turkey) Bora Tarhan	4.8	8.866		13.666	5.2	7.733	0.300	12.633	13.149	Q
9	(Bulgaria) Bozhidar Zlatanov	4.8	9.066		13.866	4.4	7.833		12.233	13.049	R1
10	(Czech Republic) Daniel Bago	4.4	9.000	0.100	13.300	4.0	8.733		12.733	13.016	R2
11	(Finland) Niila Sinivuori	4.8	9.100		13.900	2.8	9.300		12.100	13.000	R3

==== Parallel bars ====
Rank	Gymnast	D Score	E Score	Pen.	Total	Qual.
1	(Ukraine) Illia Kovtun	5.7	8.533		14.233	Q
2	(Hungary) Krisztián Balázs	5.2	8.566		13.766	Q
3	(Bulgaria) Bozhidar Zlatanov	4.7	8.533		13.233	Q
4	(Bulgaria) Teodor Trifonov	4.5	8.633		13.133	Q
5	(Romania) Robert Burtănete	4.6	8.533		13.133	Q
6	(Turkey) Mert Efe Kılıçer	4.2	8.900		13.100	Q
7	(Ukraine) Mykyta Melnykov	5.2	7.900		13.100	Q
8	(Israel) Dmytro Dotsenko	4.2	8.866		13.066	Q
9	(Ukraine) Radomyr Stelmakh	4.6	8.366		12.966	–
10	(Bulgaria) Zdravko Dobrev	4.2	8.700		12.900	–
11	(Ukraine) Volodymyr Kostiuk	5.2	7.666		12.866	–
12	(Hungary) Botond Molnár	4.3	8.533		12.833	R1
13	(Iceland) Jónas Ingi Þórisson	3.9	8.666		12.566	R2
14	(Turkey) Bora Tarhan	4.0	8.533		12.533	R3

==== Horizontal bar ====
Rank	Gymnast	D Score	E Score	Pen.	Total	Qual.
1	(Hungary) Krisztián Balázs	4.9	8.266		13.166	Q
2	(Ukraine) Mykyta Melnykov	4.5	8.500		13.000	Q
3	(Ukraine) Volodymyr Kostiuk	4.4	8.400		12.800	Q
4	(Ukraine) Illia Kovtun	5.3	7.500		12.800	–
5	(Turkey) Mert Efe Kılıçer	4.1	8.400		12.500	Q
6	(Turkey) Bora Tarhan	3.5	8.833		12.333	Q
7	(Latvia) Ričards Plate	4.0	8.233		12.233	Q
8	(Bulgaria) Bozhidar Zlatanov	4.1	8.133		12.233	Q
9	(Bulgaria) Daniel Trifonov	4.0	8.166		12.166	Q
10	(Romania) Nicolae Ionel Bera	3.4	8.666		12.066	R1
11	(Austria) Askhab Matiev	3.8	8.266		12.066	R2
12	(Romania) Gabriel Burtănete	4.0	8.000		12.000	R3
