= Vinzenz Höck =

Austrian artistic gymnast (born 1996)

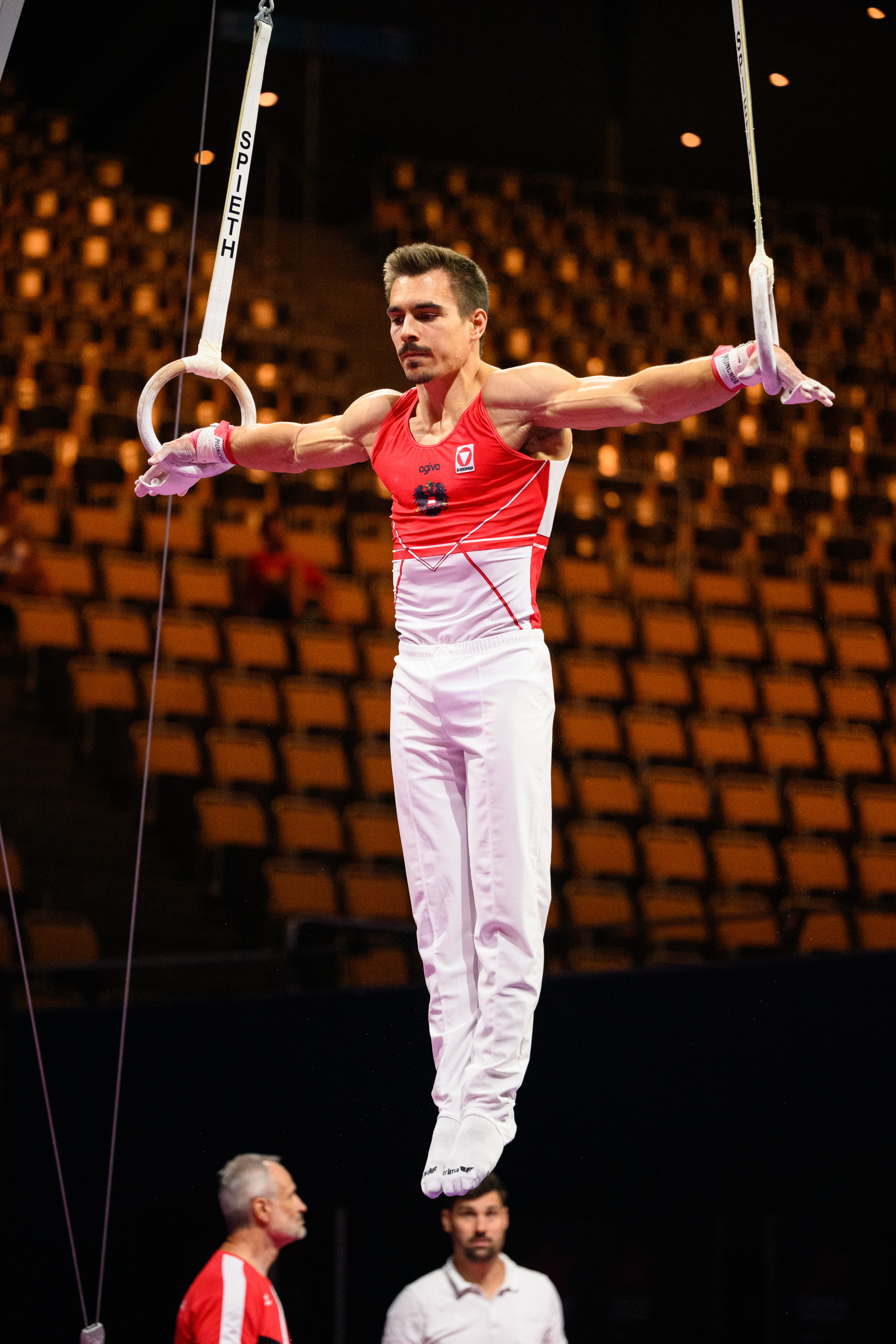
- Höck at the 2022 European Championships

Personal information
- Born: 6 March 1996 (age 30) Salzburg, Austria

Gymnastics career
- Discipline: Men's artistic gymnastics
- Country represented: Austria
- Retired: October 5, 2025
Medal record
Representing Austria
European Championships
Silver medal – second place	2020 Mersin	Rings
Summer Universiade
Silver medal – second place	2019 Naples	Rings

Vinzenz Höck (born 6 March 1996) is an Austrian artistic gymnast.

In 2017, he competed in the men's artistic team all-around event at the Summer Universiade held in Taipei, Taiwan. In 2019, he won the silver medal in the rings event at the Summer Universiade held in Naples, Italy.

He won the silver medal in the rings event at the 2020 European Men's Artistic Gymnastics Championships held in Mersin, Turkey.
