= Alexander Myakinin =

Israeli artistic gymnast

- Александр Мякинин
- Born: 1995 (age 30–31)

Gymnastics career
- Discipline: Men's artistic gymnastics
- Country represented: Israel
Medal record
Representing Israel
European Championships
Bronze medal – third place	2020 Mersin	Horizontal bar

Alexander Myakinin (Russian: Александр Мякинин; born 1995) is a Russian-born Israeli artistic gymnast.

In 2020, he won the bronze medal in the horizontal bar event at the European Men's Artistic Gymnastics Championships held in Mersin, Turkey.
