= Artem Dolgopyat =

Israeli artistic gymnast (born 1997)

- Артем Долгопят ארטיום דולגופיאט
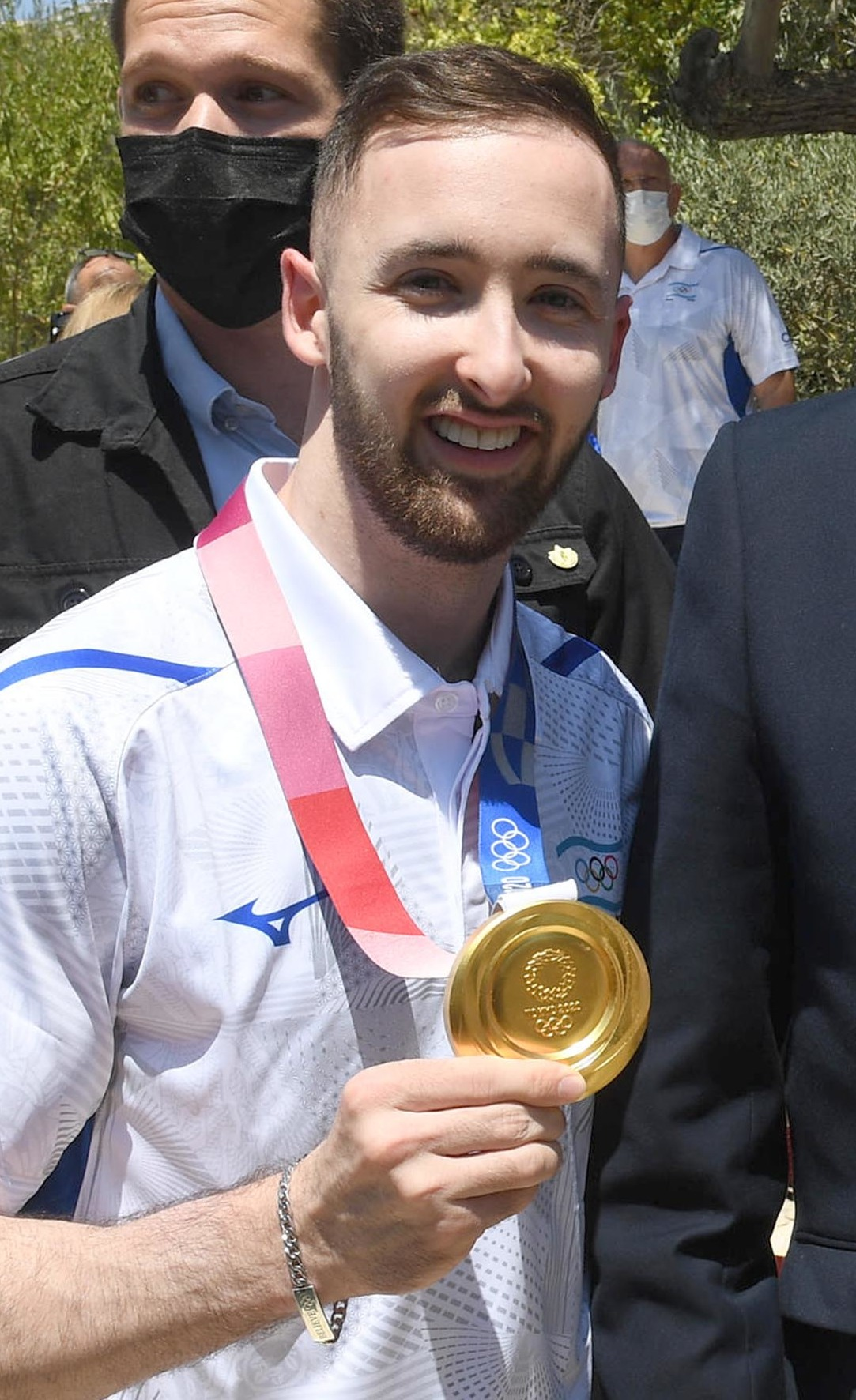
- Dolgopyat at Beit HaNassi in August 2021

Personal information
- Full name: Artem Olegovich Dolgopyat
- Born: 16 June 1997 (age 29) Dnipropetrovsk, Ukraine
- Height: 1.64 m (5 ft 5 in)

Gymnastics career
- Discipline: Men's artistic gymnastics
- Country represented: Israel
- Club: Maccabi Tel Aviv
- Gym: Wingate Institute
- Head coach: Sergey Vaisburg
Medal record
Men's artistic gymnastics
Representing Israel
Event	1st	2nd	3rd
Olympic Games	1	1	0
World Championships	1	2	1
European Championships	3	4	1
Maccabiah Games	3	0	1
Total	8	7	3
Olympic Games
Gold medal – first place	2020 Tokyo	Floor Exercise
Silver medal – second place	2024 Paris	Floor Exercise
World Championships
Gold medal – first place	2023 Antwerp	Floor Exercise
Silver medal – second place	2017 Montreal	Floor Exercise
Silver medal – second place	2019 Stuttgart	Floor Exercise
Bronze medal – third place	2026 Rotterdam	Floor Exercise
European Championships
Gold medal – first place	2020 Mersin	Floor Exercise
Gold medal – first place	2022 Munich	Floor Exercise
Gold medal – first place	2026 Zagreb	Floor Exercise
Silver medal – second place	2018 Glasgow	Floor Exercise
Silver medal – second place	2019 Szczecin	Floor Exercise
Silver medal – second place	2023 Antalya	Floor Exercise
Silver medal – second place	2024 Rimini	Floor Exercise
Bronze medal – third place	2020 Mersin	Vault
Maccabiah Games
Gold medal – first place	2017 Tel Aviv	Floor Exercise
Gold medal – first place	2017 Tel Aviv	Pommel Horse
Gold medal – first place	2026 Jerusalem	All Around
Bronze medal – third place	2017 Tel Aviv	Vault
FIG World Cup
Event	1st	2nd	3rd
World Cup	10	1	2
World Challenge Cup	7	6	2
Total	17	7	4

Artem Olegovich Dolgopyat (Hebrew: ארטיום דולגופיאט; Ukrainian: Артем Олегович Долгопят, romanized: Artem Olehovych Dolhopiat; born 16 June 1997) is a Ukrainian-born Israeli artistic gymnast. On floor exercise he is the 2020 Olympic champion and the 2023 World champion, the 2024 Olympic silver medalist, a two-time World silver medalist (2017 and 2019), and is the 2020, 2022 and 2026 European champion.

== Early life ==
Dolgopyat was born in Dnipropetrovsk (now Dnipro), Ukraine. Dolgopyat's father Oleg, a former gymnast, is Jewish, and Dolgopyat's mother Angela Bilan is not Jewish.

In 2009, at the age of 12, Dolgopyat immigrated with his family to Israel, where they first lived in Lod and then in Rishon LeZion. He joined the gymnastics team of Maccabi Tel Aviv where he was trained by Israeli coach Sergey Vaisburg. His parents divorced in 2012. He attended the Shevah Mofet school in Tel Aviv, Israel; however he later dropped out of high school due to language difficulties and the burden of training. He later studied at Tel Aviv University.

He enlisted in the Israel Defense Forces, served at the Tel HaShomer base, and became a sergeant. He lives in Netanya, Israel, with his fiancée, Maria Sakovich, a translator in four languages.

== Athletic career ==
Dolgopyat trains in Israel at the Wingate Institute.

=== Early career; Israeli junior champion ===
By the age of 12, when he moved to Israel, Dolgopyat was already a two-time national champion in Ukraine for his age group.

In August 2014, at the age of 17, Dolgopyat competed in the 2014 Summer Youth Olympics in Nanjing, China, and finished 5th in vault, 7th in floor exercise, and 10th in the individual all-around event.

=== 2015–16; Israeli champion ===
On 19 September 2015, Dolgopyat competed in 'Grand Prix Osijek' in Croatia, and won the gold medal in floor exercise, scoring 14.800.

Later that year, Dolgopyat won the floor exercise in the Israeli Championship for the first time, defeating Israeli Olympian Alexander Shatilov, who later became his mentor and friend.

At the end of 2016, he took three months off from the sport, due to back pain.

=== 2017; Maccabiah Champion ===
On 22 April 2017, Dolgopyat competed for his first time in the European Artistic Gymnastics Championships in Cluj-Napoca, Romania, and finished 4th in the floor exercise with a score of 14.33, one place behind bronze medalist Shatilov.

On 20 May 2017, Dolgopyat won the silver medal in the 2017 Grand Prix Osijek after scoring 14.700.

In July 2017, Dolgopyat competed in the 2017 Maccabiah Games in Israel, where he won two gold medals in the floor exercise and pommel horse, and a bronze medal in the vault.

In October 2017, at the 2017 Artistic Gymnastics World Championships held in Montreal, Canada, Dolgopyat won the silver medal in the floor exercise after scoring 14.533, behind Japan's three-time world champion Kenzō Shirai, while competing with an injured right foot. He garnered the best Israeli result ever at the World Artistic Gymnastics Championships as he became the second Israeli gymnast to win a medal in the Championships (after his mentor and trainer Alex Shatilov, who won bronze medals in 2009 and 2011), and the first to win a silver medal.

He was named the 2017 Israeli Sportsman of the Year.

=== 2018 ===
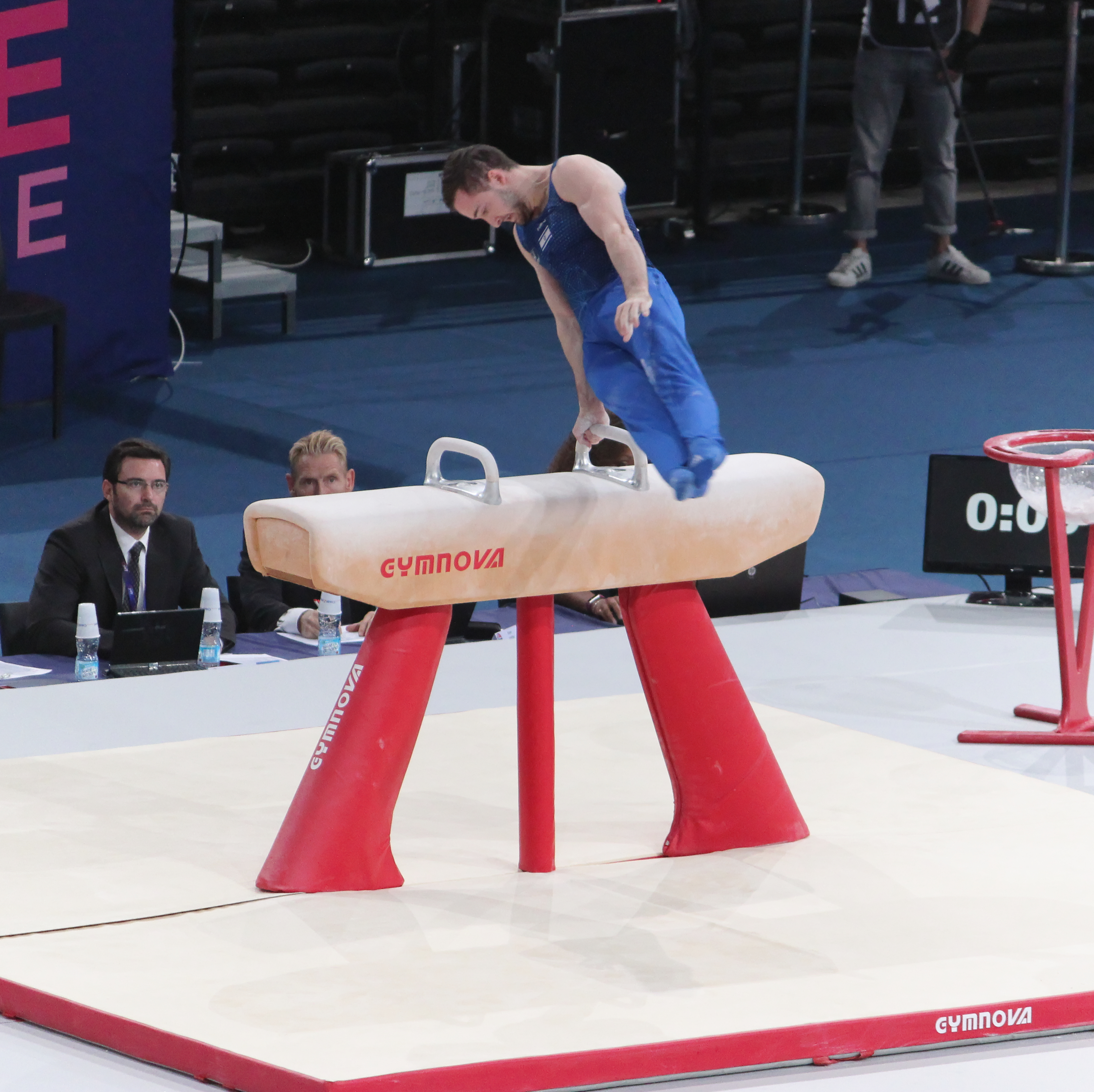
Dolgopyat in 2018

In August 2018 at the 2018 European Championships in Glasgow, Scotland, he won the silver medal in the floor exercise after scoring 14.466.

That year, he also won a number of medals on floor; gold from World Challenge Cup Paris, gold from World Challenge Cup Szombathely, silver from World Challenge Cup Koper, and silver from World Challenge Cup Osijek.

=== 2019–20; European Champion ===
At the 2019 World Artistic Gymnastics Championships held in Stuttgart, Germany, Dolgopyat won the silver medal for the second time on floor exercise with a score of 15.200 behind Carlos Yulo of the Philippines, who scored a 15.300. Dolgopyat and Yulo were both awarded the same execution score of 8.800, but the latter had a higher difficulty score of 6.5 versus the former's 6.4, which resulted in Yulo securing this win.

That year, Dolgopyat also competed at the 2019 European Championships held in Szczecin, Poland, and won the silver medal in the floor exercise after scoring 14.900 in the final

At the 2020 European Championships in Mersin, Turkey, he won two medals; gold on the floor exercise with a score of 15.000 and bronze on the vault. Dolgopyat became the second Israeli gymnast to win a European gold. He qualified to the floor final from the second place with a score of 14.933 and finished first in the final after scoring 15.000. On the vault, Dolgopyat scored an average of 14.483 in the final and finished third.

=== 2020 Tokyo Olympics; Olympic Champion ===
At the 2020 Summer Olympics in Tokyo, he won gold for Israel on the floor exercise. It was Israel's first Olympic medal in gymnastics, and second-ever gold medal at the Olympics. Dolgopyat competed on the pommel horse and the floor exercise. He did not qualify to the pommel horse final after scoring 12.766 in qualifications. On the floor exercise, he qualified to the final in first place after scoring 15.200. On the floor exercise final, he scored 14.933, same as Rayderley Zapata from Spain, but finished first due to a higher difficulty score. He said: "I wanted to cry on the medal podium but couldn’t, because I was in a storm of emotions. I cried on the inside." Immediately after his win he said that his next dream was to win the medal again at the 2024 Paris Olympics. His father said he was ecstatic at his son's success, and then added "No matter what, he could’ve done much better, but we don’t judge the winners.”

Israeli Prime Minister Naftali Bennett interrupted the weekly Israeli Cabinet meeting and called Dolgopyat, to congratulate him on winning his gold medal. Dolgopyat received a hero's reception at the Tel Aviv airport upon returning to Israel.

=== 2021–22; European Champion ===
Along with fellow Israeli gymnastic gold medalist Linoy Ashram he was named No. 47 on The Jerusalem Post's Top 50 Most Influential Jews of 2021.

At the 2022 Senior European Championships in Munich, Germany, he won the gold medal in the floor exercise.

=== 2023; World Champion ===
In March 2023 Dolgopyat tore a ligament in his knee during training. Despite this he won silver on floor exercise at the 2023 European Championships. After the competition, he took ten weeks away from gymnastics to rehabilitate his knee injury and an Achilles tendon injury.

At the 2023 World Championships Dolgopyat qualified to the all-around in eighth but withdrew in order to focus on the floor exercise final, where he ultimately won gold, his first World title on the apparatus. The final took place on the same day as the October 7 attacks, and as a result, the Israeli flag was raised with black ribbons during the medal ceremony to mourn the victims of the attack.

=== 2024–present; 2024 Paris Olympics ===
Dolgopyat represented Israel at the 2024 Paris Olympics in gymnastics at the Bercy Arena.

He won the silver medal in Men's floor with a score of 14.966 in the final; it was his second Olympic medal.

In August 2026, at the European Men's Artistic Gymnastics Championships in Zagreb, Croatia, Dolgopyat won the gold medal in the floor exercise after scoring 14.466 in the final.

== Achievements ==
Year	Tournament	City	Apparatus	Place	Ref.
2015	World Challenge Cup	Osijek	Floor	1st place, gold medalist(s)	
2017	World Challenge Cup	Osijek	Floor	2nd place, silver medalist(s)	
2017	World Championships	Montreal	Floor	2nd place, silver medalist(s)	
2018	World Challenge Cup	Osijek	Floor	2nd place, silver medalist(s)	
2018	World Challenge Cup	Koper	Floor	2nd place, silver medalist(s)	
2018	European Championships	Glasgow	Floor	2nd place, silver medalist(s)	
2018	World Challenge Cup	Szombathely	Floor	1st place, gold medalist(s)	
2018	World Challenge Cup	Paris	Floor	1st place, gold medalist(s)	
2018	World Cup	Cottbus	Floor	1st place, gold medalist(s)	
2019	World Cup	Baku	Floor	1st place, gold medalist(s)	
2019	European Championships	Szczecin	Floor	2nd place, silver medalist(s)	
2019	World Challenge Cup	Osijek	Floor	1st place, gold medalist(s)	
2019	World Challenge Cup	Szombathely	Floor	1st place, gold medalist(s)	
2019	World Challenge Cup	Paris	Floor	2nd place, silver medalist(s)	
2019	World Championships	Stuttgart	Floor	2nd place, silver medalist(s)	
2020	European Championships	Mersin	Floor	1st place, gold medalist(s)	
2020	European Championships	Mersin	Vault	3rd place, bronze medalist(s)	
2021	World Challenge Cup	Varna	Floor	2nd place, silver medalist(s)	
2021	World Cup	Doha	Floor	1st place, gold medalist(s)	
2021	Olympic Games	Tokyo	Floor	1st place, gold medalist(s)	
2022	World Cup	Doha	Floor	1st place, gold medalist(s)	
2022	World Cup	Cairo	Floor	1st place, gold medalist(s)	
2022	World Cup	Cairo	Vault	3rd place, bronze medalist(s)	
2022	World Cup	Baku	Floor	1st place, gold medalist(s)	
2022	World Cup	Baku	Vault	3rd place, bronze medalist(s)	
2022	European Championships	Munich	Floor	1st place, gold medalist(s)	
2022	World Challenge Cup	Paris	Vault	3rd place, bronze medalist(s)	
2023	World Cup	Cottbus	Floor	1st place, gold medalist(s)	
2023	European Championships	Antalya	Floor	2nd place, silver medalist(s)	
2023	World Championships	Antwerp	Floor	1st place, gold medalist(s)	
2024	Olympic Games	Paris	Floor	2nd place, silver medalist(s)	
2025	World Cup	Osijek	Floor	1st place, gold medalist(s)	
2025	World Cup	Paris	Floor	1st place, gold medalist(s)	
2025	World Cup	Szombathely	Floor	3rd place, bronze medalist(s)	
2026	World Cup	Cottbus	Floor	1st place, gold medalist(s)	
2026	World Cup	Osijek	Floor	1st place, gold medalist(s)	
2026	European Championships	Zagreb	Floor	1st place, gold medalist(s)	
2026	World Challenge Cup	Paris	Floor	1st place, gold medalist(s)	
2026	World Championships	Rotterdam	Floor	3rd place, bronze medalist(s)	

== Honors ==
At the 2022 Maccabiah Games, Dolgopyat and fellow Olympic champion Linoy Ashram were honored as the final torchbearers who jointly lit the flame to officially open the event.

== See also ==
- List of select Jewish gymnasts
- Sports in Israel
