= List of women artistic gymnasts =

Women artistic gymnasts are women who participate in the sport of gymnastics, specifically artistic gymnastics. Women first competed in Gymnastics at the Summer Olympics in 1928. This list is of those who are considered to be notable in women's artistic gymnastics. See gymnasium (ancient Greece) for the origin of the word gymnast from gymnastikos.

== A ==
Algeria
Gymnast	Birth date	FIG listing
Kaylia Nemour	30 December 2006	Kaylia Nemour

Argentina
Gymnast	Birth date	FIG listing
Brisa Carraro	8 May 2005	Brisa Carraro
Martina Dominici	3 January 2002	Martina Dominici
Abigail Magistrati	29 December 2003	Abigail Magistrati
Mia Mainardi	17 April 2008	Mia Mainardi
Ailen Valente	26 March 1996	Ailen Valente

Australia
Gymnast	Birth date	FIG listing
Georgia Bonora	19 May 1990	Georgia Bonora
Ashleigh Brennan	18 January 1991	Ashleigh Brennan
Georgia-Rose Brown	22 January 1995	Georgia-Rose Brown
Georgia Godwin	28 October 1997	Georgia Godwin
Daria Joura	2 May 1990	Daria Joura
Emily Little	29 March 1994	Emily Little
Lauren Mitchell	23 July 1991	Lauren Mitchell
Emma Nedov	11 March 1996	Emma Nedov
Monette Russo	4 August 1988	Monette Russo
Kate Sayer	8 March 2003	Kate Sayer
Lisa Skinner	17 February 1981	Lisa Skinner
Allana Slater	3 April 1984	Allana Slater

Azerbaijan
Gymnast	Birth date	FIG listing
Marina Nekrasova	19 April 1995	Marina Nekrasova
Yulia Inshina	15 April 1995	Yulia Inshina
Anna Pavlova	6 September 1987	Anna Pavlova

== B ==
Belarus
Gymnast	Birth date	FIG listing
Anastasiya Alistratava	16 October 2003	Anastasiya Alistratava
Svetlana Boguinskaya (Note: Svetlana Boguinskaya has represented Belarus, and the USSR)	19 February 1973	Svetlana Boguinskaya
Nellie Kim (Note: Nellie Kim has represented Belarus, and the USSR)	29 July 1957	Nellie Kim
Olga Korbut	16 May 1955	Olga Korbut

Belgium
Gymnast	Birth date	FIG listing
Nina Derwael	26 March 2000	Nina Derwael
Lisa Vaelen	10 August 2004	Lisa Vaelen
Jutta Verkest	11 October 2005	Jutta Verkest

Brazil
Gymnast	Birth date	FIG listing
Rebeca Andrade	8 May 1999	Rebeca Andrade
Jade Barbosa	1 July 1991	Jade Barbosa
Thaís Fidélis	23 July 2001	Thaís Fidélis
Daniele Hypólito	8 September 1984	Daniele Hypólito
Lorrane Oliveira	13 April 1998	Lorrane Oliveira
Daiane dos Santos	10 February 1983	Daiane dos Santos
Flávia Saraiva	30 September 1999	Flávia Saraiva
Júlia Soares	23 August 2005	Júlia Soares

== C ==
Canada
Gymnast	Birth date	FIG listing
Zoé Allaire-Bourgie	27 September 2004	Zoé Allaire-Bourgie
Ellie Black	9 August 1995	Ellie Black
Elyse Hopfner-Hibbs	12 September 1989	Elyse Hopfner-Hibbs
Brooklyn Moors	23 February 2001	Brooklyn Moors
Victoria Moors	5 November 1996	Victoria Moors
Shallon Olsen	10 July 2000	Shallon Olsen
Isabela Onyshko	23 June 1998	Isabela Onyshko
Ana Padurariu	1 August 2002	Ana Padurariu
Kate Richardson	27 June 1984	Kate Richardson
Elfi Schlegel	17 May 1964	Elfi Schlegel
Emma Spence	27 February 2003	Emma Spence
Ava Stewart	30 September 2005	Ava Stewart
Rose-Kaying Woo	12 January 2000	Rose Woo
Victoria-Kayen Woo	15 October 1997	Victoria Woo

Cayman Islands
Gymnast	Birth date	FIG listing
Raegan Rutty	14 January 2002	Raegan Rutty

Costa Rica
Gymnast	Birth date	FIG listing
Luciana Alvarado	16 September 2002	Luciana Alvarado

Cuba
Gymnast	Birth date	FIG listing
Yesenia Ferrera	16 October 1998	Yesenia Ferrera
Marcia Vidiaux	21 July 1999	Marcia Vidiaux

Czechoslovakia
Gymnast	Birth date	FIG listing
Eva Bosáková	18 December 1931	Eva Bosáková
Věra Čáslavská	3 May 1942	Věra Čáslavská
Vlasta Děkanová	5 September 1909	
Jana Komrsková	6 May 1983	Jana Komrsková

China
Gymnast	Birth date	FIG listing
Chen Yile	5 January 2002	Chen Yile
Cheng Fei	29 May 1988	Cheng Fei
Deng Linlin	21 April 1992	Deng Linlin
Fan Ye	22 October 1986	Fan Ye
Fan Yilin	11 November 1999	Fan Yilin
Guan Chenchen	25 September 2004	Guan Chenchen
He Kexin	1 January 1992	He Kexin
He Ning	13 November 1990	He Ning
Jiang Yuyuan	1 November 1991	Jiang Yuyuan
Kui Yuanyuan	23 June 1981	Kui Yuanyuan
Li Li	26 February 1975	Li Li
Li Shanshan	31 August 1996	Li Shanshan
Li Shijia	7 October 2003	Li Shijia
Li Ya	13 June 1988	Li Ya
Liu Jinru	13 October 2000	Liu Jinru
Liu Tingting	6 September 2000	Liu Tingting
Liu Xuan	12 March 1979	Liu Xuan
Lu Li	1976	Lu Li
Luo Huan	6 March 2000	Luo Huan
Ma Yanhong	1964	Ma Yanhong
Mo Huilan	11 July 1979	Mo Huilan
Ou Yushan	13 January 2004	Ou Yushan
Qi Qi	28 September 2003	Qi Qi
Shang Chunsong	18 March 1996	Shang Chunsong
Sang Lan	1981	
Sui Lu	1 April 1992	Sui Lu
Tang Xijing	3 January 2003	Tang Xijing
Wang Yan	30 October 1999	Wang Yan (gymnast)
Wei Xiaoyuan	25 August 2004	Wei Xiaoyuan
Xiao Sha	15 June 1992	Xiao Sha
Yang Yilin	26 August 1991	Yang Yilin
Yao Jinnan	8 February 1995	Yao Jinnan
Zhang Nan	30 April 1986	Zhang Nan
Zhou Zhuoru	14 September 1988	Zhou Zhuoru

== D ==
Denmark
Gymnast	Birth date	FIG listing
Camille Rasmussen	15 June 2004	Camille Rasmussen

Dominican Republic
Gymnast	Birth date	FIG listing
Yamilet Peña	14 December 1992	Yamilet Peña

== E ==
Egypt
Gymnast	Birth date	FIG listing
Jana Abdelsalam	3 January 2006	Jana Abdelsalam
Jana Aboelhasan	29 September 2005	Jana Aboelhasan
Sherine El-Zeiny	23 February 1991	Sherine El-Zeiny
Farah Hussein	7 October 2001	Farah Hussein
Zeina Ibrahim	20 June 2003	Zeina Ibrahim
Jana Mahmoud	17 August 2004	Jana Mahmoud
Mandy Mohamed	23 February 2000	Mandy Mohamed
Nancy Taman	15 November 1994	Nancy Taman

== F ==
Finland
Gymnast	Birth date	FIG listing
Maisa Kuusikko	16 June 2005	Maisa Kuusikko

France
Gymnast	Birth date	FIG listing
Marine Boyer	22 March 2000	Marine Boyer
Lorette Charpy	3 December 2001	Lorette Charpy
Mélanie de Jesus dos Santos	5 March 2000	Mélanie de Jesus dos Santos
Coline Devillard	9 October 2000	Coline Devillard
Aline Friess	5 July 2003	Aline Friess
Ludivine Furnon	4 October 1980	Ludivine Furnon
Émilie Le Pennec	31 December 1987	Émilie Lepennec
Morgane Osyssek	15 December 2002	Morgane Osyssek
Claire Pontlevoy	17 November 2003	Claire Pontlevoy
Elvire Teza	23 March 1981	Elvire Teza
Ming van Eijken	3 April 2008	Ming van Eijken

== G ==
Georgia
Gymnast	Birth date	FIG listing
Maria Kharenkova	29 October 1998	Maria Kharenkova

Germany
Gymnast	Birth date	FIG listing
Tabea Alt	18 March 2000	Tabea Alt
Daria Bijak	12 November 1985	Daria Bijak
Anja Brinker	18 January 1991	Anja Brinker
Kim Bui	20 January 1989	Kim Bui
Karin Büttner-Janz	17 February 1952	Karin Büttner-Janz
Oksana Chusovitina (Note: Oksana Chusovitina has represented Germany, The USSR and Uzbekistan)	19 June 1975	Oksana Chusovitina
Maxi Gnauck	10 October 1964	Maxi Gnauck
Leah Grießer	11 September 1998	Leah Grießer
Dagmar Kersten	28 October 1970	Dagmar Kersten
Helen Kevric	21 March 2008	Helen Kevric
Steffi Kräker	21 April 1960	
Emelie Petz	23 March 2003	Emelie Petz
Pauline Schäfer	4 January 1997	Pauline Schäfer
Sophie Scheder	7 January 1997	Sophie Scheder
Elisabeth Seitz	4 November 1993	Elisabeth Seitz
Pauline Tratz	14 June 1999	Pauline Tratz
Sarah Voss	21 October 1999	Sarah Voss
Lisa Zimmermann	13 February 2003	Lisa Zimmermann
Erika Zuchold	13 March 1947	Erika Zuchold

Great Britain
Gymnast	Birth date	FIG listing
Ondine Achampong	10 February 2004	Ondine Achampong
Sophie Brundish	17 May 1993	Sophie Brundish
Imogen Cairns	26 January 1989	Imogen Cairns
Becky Downie	24 January 1992	Becky Downie
Ellie Downie	20 July 1999	Ellie Downie
Claudia Fragapane	24 October 1997	Claudia Fragapane
Jennifer Gadirova	3 October 2004	Jennifer Gadirova
Jessica Gadirova	3 October 2004	Jessica Gadirova
Ruby Harrold	4 June 1996	Ruby Harrold
Marissa King	20 April 1991	Marissa King
Alice Kinsella	13 March 2001	Alice Kinsella
Lisa Mason	1982	Lisa Mason
Maisie Methuen	22 June 2001	Maisie Methuen
Amelie Morgan	31 May 2003	Amelie Morgan
Annika Reeder	1979	Annika Reeder
Joanna Sime	1962	
Kelly Simm	23 April 1995	Kelly Simm
Lucy Stanhope	19 September 2001	Lucy Stanhope
Amy Tinkler	27 October 1999	Amy Tinkler
Beth Tweddle	1 April 1985	Elizabeth Tweddle
Hannah Whelan	1 July 1992	Hannah Whelan

Greece
Gymnast	Birth date	FIG listing
Stefani Bismpikou	27 June 1988	Stefani Bismpikou
Vasiliki Millousi	4 May 1984	Vasiliki Millousi

Guatemala
Gymnast	Birth date	FIG listing
Ana Sofía Gómez	24 November 1995	Ana Sofía Gómez

== H ==
Hungary
Gymnast	Birth date	FIG listing
Csenge Bácskay	4 April 2003	Csenge Bácskay
Bettina Lili Czifra	20 April 2007	Bettina Lili Czifra
Ágnes Keleti	9 June 1921	Ágnes Keleti
Margit Korondi	24 June 1932	Margit Korondi
Zsófia Kovács	6 April 2000	Zsófia Kovács
Gréta Mayer	26 September 2006	Gréta Mayer
Henrietta Ónodi	22 May 1974	Henrietta Ónodi
Zója Székely	5 May 2003	Zója Székely
Nikolett Szilágyi	25 September 2005	Nikolett Szilágyi
Hanna Szujó	14 February 2004	Hanna Szujó

== I ==
Iceland
Gymnast	Birth date	FIG listing
Thelma Aðalsteinsdóttir	1 December 2000	Thelma Adalsteinsdottir
Irina Sazonova	2 September 1991	Irina Sazonova

India
Gymnast	Birth date	FIG listing
Dipa Karmakar	9 August 1993	Dipa Karmakar
Pranati Nayak	6 April 1995	Pranati Nayak

Ireland
Gymnast	Birth date	FIG listing
Megan Ryan	3 April 2002	Megan Ryan
Emma Slevin	2 May 2003	Emma Slevin

Israel
Gymnast	Birth date	FIG listing
Valeria Maksyuta	27 September 1987	Valeria Maksyuta
Ofir Netzer	13 May 1996	Ofir Netzer
Lihie Raz	14 September 2003	Lihie Raz

Italy
Gymnast	Birth date	FIG listing
Angela Andreoli	6 June 2006	Angela Andreoli
Desiree Carofiglio	11 March 2000	Desiree Carofiglio
Alice D'Amato	7 February 2003	Alice D'Amato
Asia D'Amato	7 February 2003	Asia D'Amato
Manila Esposito	2 November 2006	Manila Esposito
Erika Fasana	17 February 1996	Erika Fasana
Carlotta Ferlito	15 February 1995	Carlotta Ferlito
Vanessa Ferrari	10 November 1990	Vanessa Ferrari
Caterina Gaddi	10 July 2008	Caterina Gaddi
Elisa Iorio	23 March 2003	Elisa Iorio
Martina Maggio	26 July 2001	Martina Maggio
July Marano	23 September 2008	July Marano
Lara Mori	26 July 1998	Lara Mori
Giulia Perotti	29 August 2009	Giulia Perotti
Giorgia Villa	23 February 2003	Giorgia Villa

== J ==
Jamaica
Gymnast	Birth date	FIG listing
Danusia Francis	13 May 1994	Danusia Francis
Toni-Ann Williams	20 November 1995	Toni-Ann Williams

Japan
Gymnast	Birth date	FIG listing
Urara Ashikawa	8 March 2003	Urara Ashikawa
Hitomi Hatakeda	1 September 2000	Hitomi Hatakeda
Sae Miyakawa	10 September 1999	Saw Miyakawa
Shoko Miyata	24 September 2004	Shoko Miyata
Mai Murakami	5 August 1996	Mai Murakami
Aiko Sugihara	19 September 1999	Aiko Sugihara
Asuka Teramoto	19 November 1995	Asuka Teramoto
Hazuki Watanabe	7 August 2004	Hazuki Watanabe

== L ==
Lithuania
Gymnast	Birth date	FIG listing
Agata Vostruchovaitė	2 December 2000	Agata Vostruchovaitė

== M ==
Mexico
Gymnast	Birth date	FIG listing
Natalia Escalera	3 July 2002	Natalia Escalera
Elsa García	8 February 1990	Elsa García
Denisse López	18 December 1976	Denisse López
Brenda Magaña	27 July 1977	Brenda Magaña
Alexa Moreno	8 August 1994	Alexa Moreno
Laura del Carmen Moreno	16 November 1978	Laura del Carmen Moreno
Ahtziri Sandoval	5 October 1996	Ahtziri Sandoval

== N ==
Netherlands
Gymnast	Birth date	FIG listing
Eythora Thorsdottir	10 August 1998	Eythora Thorsdottir
Céline van Gerner	1 December 1994	Celine van Gerner
Laura van Leeuwen	22 April 1986	Laura van Leeuwen
Vera van Pol	17 December 1993	Vera van Pol
Sanna Veerman	29 January 2002	Sanna Veerman
Naomi Visser	24 August 2001	Naomi Visser
Tisha Volleman	26 October 1999	Tisha Volleman
Lieke Wevers	17 September 1991	Lieke Wevers
Sanne Wevers	17 September 1991	Sanne Wevers

North Korea
Gymnast	Birth date	FIG listing
Kim Gwang-suk	circa 1976/8	Kim Gwang-suk
Hong Su-jong	9 March 1986	Hong Su-jong
Hong Un-jong	9 March 1989	Hong Un-jong

== P ==
Panama
Hillary Heron	29 January 2004	Hillary Heron
Karla Navas	12 September 2004	Karla Navas

Philippines
Aleah Finnegan (Note: Aleah Finnegan has represented the USA and Philippines)	4 January 2003	Aleah Finnegan
Emma Malabuyo (Note: Emma Malabuyo has represented the USA and Philippines)	November 5, 2002	Emma Malabuyo
Levi Ruivivar	May 3, 2006	Levi Ruivivar

Poland
Gymnast	Birth date	FIG listing
Katarzyna Jurkowska-Kowalska	18 February 1992	Katarzyna Jurkowska-Kowalska
Helena Rakoczy	3 December 1921 – 2 September 2014	Helena Rakoczy
Marta Pihan-Kulesza	23 July 1987	Marta Pihan-Kulesza

== R ==
Romania
Gymnast	Birth date	FIG listing
Lavinia Agache	11 February 1966	Lavinia Agache
Simona Amânar	7 October 1979	Simona Amânar
Oana Ban	11 January 1986	Oana Ban
Cristina Bontaș	5 December 1973	Cristina Bontaș
Diana Bulimar	22 August 1995	Diana Bulimar
Diana Chelaru	15 August 1993	Diana Chelaru
Nadia Comăneci	12 November 1961	Nadia Comăneci
Laura Cutina	1968	
Aurelia Dobre	16 November 1972	Aurelia Dobre
Antonia Duta	8 October 2004	Antonia Duta
Emilia Eberle	4 March 1964	Emilia Eberle
Alexandra Eremia	19 February 1987	Alexandra Eremia
Gina Gogean	9 November 1977	Gina Gogean
Denisa Golgotă	8 March 2002	Denisa Golgotă
Anca Grigoraș	8 November 1957	Anca Grigoraș
Larisa Iordache	19 June 1996	Larisa Iordache
Sandra Izbașa	18 June 1990	Sandra Izbașa
Lavinia Miloșovici	21 October 1976	Lavinia Miloșovicin
Steliana Nistor	15 September 1989	Steliana Nistor
Maria Olaru	4 June 1982	Maria Olaru
Cătălina Ponor	20 August 1987	Cătălina Ponor
Celestina Popa	1970	
Ana Porgras	18 December 1993	Ana Porgras
Claudia Presăcan	1979	
Andreea Răducan	30 September 1983	Andreea Răducan
Monica Roşu	11 May 1987	Monica Roşu
Silviana Sfiringu	1 September 2004	Silviana Sfiringu
Daniela Silivaș	9 May 1970	Daniela Silivaș
Daniela Sofronie	12 February 1988	Daniela Sofronie
Ioana Stănciulescu	18 February 2004	Ioana Stănciulescu
Silvia Stroescu	8 May 1985	Silvia Stroescu
Ecaterina Szabo	22 January 1967	Ecaterina Szabo
Corina Ungureanu	29 August 1980	Corina Ungureanu
Teodora Ungureanu	13 November 1960	Teodora Ungureanu
Camelia Voinea	1 March 1970	Camelia Voinea

Russia
Gymnast	Birth date	FIG listing
Ksenia Afanasyeva	13 September 1991	Ksenia Afanasyeva
Anastasia Agafonova	4 August 2003	Anastasia Agafonova
Lilia Akhaimova	17 March 1997	Lilia Akhaimova
Irina Alexeeva	20 April 2002	Irina Alexeeva
Elena Dolgopolova	23 January 1980	Elena Dolgopolova
Anna Dementyeva	28 December 1994	Anna Dementyeva
Elena Eremina	29 July 2001	Elena Eremina
Ludmila Ezhova	4 March 1982	Ludmila Ezhova
Rozalia Galiyeva (Note: Rozalia Galiyeva has represented Russia, the USSR and Uzbekistan)	28 April 1977	Rozalia Galiyeva
Elena Gerasimova	21 June 2004	Elena Gerasimova
Anastasia Grishina	16 January 1996	Anastasia Grishina
Anastasia Ilyankova	26 May 2001	Anastasia Ilyankova
Natalia Kapitonova	31 May 2000	Natalia Kapitonova
Maria Kharenkova	29 October 1998	Maria Kharenkova
Svetlana Khorkina	19 January 1979	Svetlana Khorkina
Ksenia Klimenko	1 November 2003	Ksenia Klimenko
Anastasiya Kolesnikova	6 March 1984	Anastasiya Kolesnikova
Viktoria Komova	30 January 1995	Viktoria Komova
Dina Kochetkova	27 July 1977	Dina Kotchetkova
Ekaterina Kramarenko	22 April 1991	Ekaterina Kramarenko
Natalia Kuchinskaya (Note: Natalia Kuchinskaya has represented Russia, and the USSR)	12 March 1949	Natalia Kuchinskaya
Viktoria Listunova	12 May 2005	Viktoria Listunova
Yekaterina Lobaznyuk	10 July 1983	Yekaterina Lobaznyuk
Yulia Lozhechko	14 December 1989	Yulia Lozhechko
Angelina Melnikova	18 July 2000	Angelina Melnikova
Sofia Muratova (Note: Sofia Muratova has represented Russia, and the USSR)	13 July 1929 – 25 September 2006	Sofia Muratova
Aliya Mustafina	30 September 1994	Aliya Mustafina
Tatiana Nabieva	21 November 1994	Tatiana Nabieva
Maria Paseka	18 July 1995	Maria Paseka
Anna Pavlova	6 September 1987	Anna Pavlova
Uliana Perebinosova	4 May 2001	Uliana Perebinosova
Yelena Produnova	15 February 1980	Yelena Produnova
Ksenia Semenova	20 October 1992	Ksenia Semenova
Natalia Shaposhnikova (Note: Natalia Shaposhnikova has represented Russia, and the USSR)	24 June 1961	Natalia Shaposhnikova
Aleksandra Shchekoldina	11 July 2002	Aleksandra Shchekoldina
Angelina Simakova	26 August 2002	Angelina Simakova
Daria Spiridonova	8 July 1998	Daria Spiridonova
Seda Tutkhalyan	15 July 1999	Seda Tutkhalyan
Vladislava Urazova	14 August 2004	Vladislava Urazova
Yana Vorona	28 December 2004	Yana Vorona
Elena Zamolodchikova	19 September 1982	Elena Zamolodchikova

== S ==
Slovenia
Gymnast	Birth date	FIG listing
Teja Belak	22 April 1994	Teja Belak
Lucija Hribar	15 October 2001	Lucija Hribar
Tjaša Kysselef	27 April 1993	Tjaša Kysselef
Adela Šajn	14 April 1990	Adela Šajn

South Africa
Gymnast	Birth date	FIG listing
Kirsten Beckett	5 March 1996	Kirsten Beckett
Naveen Daries	29 October 2001	Naveen Daries
Caitlin Rooskrantz	5 November 2001	Caitlin Rooskrantz

South Korea
Gymnast	Birth date	FIG listing
Jo Hyun-joo	13 December 1992	Jo Hyun-joo
Lee Yun-seo	5 March 2003	Lee Yun-seo
Yeo Seo-jeong	20 February 2002	Yeo Seo-jeong

Soviet Union
Gymnast	Birth date	FIG listing
Polina Astakhova (Note: Polina Astakhova has represented Ukraine, and the USSR)	30 October 1936 – 5 August 2005	Polina Astakhova
Olga Bicherova	1966 or 1967	Olga Bicherova
Nina Bocharova (Note: Nina Bocharova has represented Ukraine, and the USSR)	24 September 1924	Nina Bocharova
Svetlana Boginskaya	19 February 1973	Svetlana Boguinskaya
Oksana Chusovitina	19 June 1975	Oksana Chusovitina
Olesya Dudnik (Note: Olesya Dudnik has represented Ukraine, and the USSR)	15 August 1974	
Maria Filatova	1961	Maria Filatova
Rozalia Galiyeva	28 April 1977	Rozalia Galiyeva
Maria Gorokhovskaya (Note: Maria Gorokhovskaya has represented Ukraine, and the USSR)	17 October 1921 – 22 July 2001	Maria Gorokhovskaya
Svetlana Grozdova	1959	Svetlana Grozdova
Tatiana Gutsu (Note: Tatiana Gutsu has represented Ukraine, and the USSR)	5 September 1976	Tatiana Gutsu
Natalia Ilienko	1967	Natalia Ilienko
Nellie Kim	29 July 1957	Nellie Kim
Natalia Kuchinskaya	12 March 1949	
Larisa Latynina (Note: Larisa Latynina has represented Ukraine, and the USSR)	27 December 1934	Larisa Latynina
Tamara Lazakovich	1954-1992	Tamara Lazakovich
Tatiana Lysenko	23 June 1975	Tatiana Lysenko
Tamara Manina	1934	Tamara Manina
Olga Mostepanova	1970	Tamara Manina
Elena Mukhina	1 June 1960 – 2006	Elena Mukhina
Sofia Muratova	13 July 1929 – 25 September 2006	Sofia Muratova
Oksana Omelianchik (Note: Oksana Omelianchik has represented Ukraine, and the USSR)	31 December 1969; 2 January 1970 (Note: "GymnasticGreats.com: Whatever happened to Oksana Omelianchik?". Archived from the original on 10 October 2012. shows Oksana Omelianchik's date of birth as 2 January 1970)	Oksana Omelianchik
Galina Shamrai	1931	Galina Shamrai
Natalia Shaposhnikova	24 June 1961	Natalia Shaposhnikova
Yelena Shushunova	1969	Elena Shushunova
Ludmilla Tourischeva (Note: Ludmilla Tourischeva has represented Ukraine, and the USSR)	7 October 1952	Ludmilla Tourischeva
Zinaida Voronina	1947-2001	Zinaida Voronina
Natalia Yurchenko	26 January 1955	Natalia Yurchenko
Stella Zakharova (Note: Stella Zakharova has represented Ukraine, and the USSR)	12 July 1963	Stella Zakharova

Spain
Gymnast	Birth date	FIG listing
Laura Casabuena	26 December 2005	Laura Casabuena
Elena Gómez	14 November 1985	Elena Gómez
Patricia Moreno	7 January 1988	Patricia Moreno
Ana Maria Izurieta	13 January 1993	Ana Maria Izurieta
Ana Pérez	14 December 1997	Ana Pérez
Alba Petisco	1 February 2003	Alba Petisco
Roxana Popa	2 June 1997	Roxana Popa
Cintia Rodriguez	16 November 1994	Cintia Rodriguez

Sweden
Gymnast	Birth date	FIG listing
Jonna Adlerteg	6 June 1995	Jonna Adlerteg
Jessica Castles	16 July 2002	Jessica Castles
Tonya Paulsson	28 August 2003	Tonya Paulsson

Switzerland
Gymnast	Birth date	FIG listing
Ilaria Käslin	8 December 1997	Ilaria Käslin
Giulia Steingruber	24 March 1994	Giulia Steingruber

== U ==
Ukraine
Gymnast	Birth date	FIG listing
Polina Astakhova	30 October 1936 – 5 August 2005	Polina Astakhova
Anastasia Bachynska	4 August 2003	Anastasia Bachynska
Daniela Batrona	5 September 2006	Daniela Batrona
Nina Bocharova	24 September 1924	Nina Bocharova
Olesya Dudnik	15 August 1974	
Maria Gorokhovskaya	17 October 1921 – 22 July 2001	Maria Gorokhovskaya
Tatiana Gutsu	5 September 1976	Tatiana Gutsu
Viktoria Karpenko	15 March 1981	Viktoria Karpenko
Anna Lashchevska	20 November 2007	Anna Lashchevska
Larisa Latynina	27 December 1934	Larisa Latynina
Anastasia Motak	12 November 2004	Anastasia Motak
Lilia Podkopayeva	15 August 1978	Lilia Podkopayeva
Oksana Omelianchik	31 December 1969; 2 January 1970	Oksana Omelianchik
Ludmilla Tourischeva	7 October 1952	Ludmilla Tourischeva
Diana Varinska	22 March 2001	Diana Varinska
Irina Yarotska	29 October 1985	Irina Yarotska
Stella Zakharova	12 July 1963	Stella Zakharova

USA
Gymnast	Birth date	FIG listing
Ciena Alipio	7 March 2004	Ciena Alipio
Sydney Barros	21 February 2005	Sydney Barros
Alyssa Baumann	17 May 1998	Alyssa Baumann
Mohini Bhardwaj	29 September 1978	Mohini Bhardwaj
Jana Bieger	12 November 1989	Jana Bieger
Simone Biles	14 March 1997	Simone Biles
Skye Blakely	4 February 2005	Skye Blakely
Amanda Borden	10 May 1977	
Jordan Bowers	5 April 2003	Jordan Bowers
Rebecca Bross	11 July 1993	Rebecca Bross
Jade Carey	27 May 2000	Jade Carey
Jordan Chiles	15 April 2001	Jordan Chiles
Amy Chow	15 May 1978	Amy Chow
Dominique Dawes	20 November 1976	Dominique Dawes
Nia Dennis	23 February 1999	Nia Dennis
Kayla DiCello	25 January 2004	Kayla DiCello
Gabby Douglas	31 December 1995	Gabby Douglas
Brenna Dowell	4 March 1996	Brenna Dowell
Kara Eaker	7 November 2002	Kara Eaker
Aleah Finnegan	4 January 2003	Aleah Finnegan
Sarah Finnegan	14 November 1996	Sarah Finnegan
Norah Flatley	10 March 2000	Norah Flatley
Margzetta Frazier	25 February 2000	Margzetta Frazier
Olivia Greaves	5 May 2004	Olivia Greaves
Annia Hatch	14 June 1978	Annia Hatch
Katie Heenan	26 November 1985	Katie Heenan
Laurie Hernandez	9 June 2000	Laurie Hernandez
Ivana Hong	11 December 1992	Ivana Hong
Terin Humphrey	14 August 1986	Terin Humphrey
Amelia Hundley	21 January 1998	Amelia Hundley
Morgan Hurd	18 July 2001	Morgan Hurd
Shawn Johnson	19 January 1992	Shawn Johnson
Shilese Jones	26 July 2002	Shilese Jones
Natasha Kelley	1 January 1990	Natasha Kelley
Bailie Key	16 March 1999	Bailie Key
Madison Kocian	15 June 1997	Madison Kocian
Courtney Kupets	28 July 1986	Courtney Kupets
Mattie Larson	20 May 1992	Mattie Larson
Sunisa Lee	9 March 2003	Sunisa Lee
Lilly Lippeatt	28 August 2004	Lillian Lippeatt
Nastia Liukin	30 October 1989	Nastia Liukin
Ashton Locklear	13 January 1998	Ashton Locklear
Emma Malabuyo	5 November 2002	Emma Malabuyo
Kristen Maloney	10 March 1981	Kristen Maloney
McKayla Maroney	9 December 1995	McKayla Maroney
Grace McCallum	30 October 2002	Grace McCallum
Konnor McClain	1 February 2005	Konnor McClain
Courtney McCool	1 April 1988	Courtney McCool
Riley McCusker	9 July 2001	Riley McCusker
Chellsie Memmel	23 June 1988	Chellsie Memmel
Ashley Miles	3 March 1985	Ashley Miles
Shannon Miller	10 March 1977	Shannon Miller
Phoebe Mills	2 November 1972	Phoebe Mills
Dominique Moceanu	30 September 1981	Dominique Moceanu
Maggie Nichols	12 September 1997	Maggie Nichols
Maile O'Keefe	26 February 2002	Maile O'Keefe
Carly Patterson	4 February 1988	Carly Patterson
Samantha Peszek	14 December 1991	Samantha Peszek
Jaycie Phelps	26 September 1979	Jaycie Phelps
Elizabeth Price	28 May 1996	Elizabeth Price
Ashley Priess	8 March 1990	Ashley Priess
Aly Raisman	25 May 1994	Aly Raisman
Mary Lou Retton	24 January 1968	Mary Lou Retton
Kyla Ross	24 October 1996	Kyla Ross
Alicia Sacramone	3 December 1987	Alicia Sacramone
Alyona Shchennikova	12 May 2001	Alyona Shchennikova
MyKayla Skinner	9 December 1996	MyKayla Skinner
Bridget Sloan	23 June 1992	Bridget Sloan
Ragan Smith	8 August 2000	Ragan Smith
Kerri Strug	19 November 1977	Kerri Strug
Trinity Thomas	7 April 2001	Trinity Thomas
Faith Torrez	9 December 2003	Faith Torrez
Kristal Uzelac	27 June 1985	
Jordyn Wieber	12 July 1995	Jordyn Wieber
Leanne Wong	20 September 2003	Leanne Wong
Shayla Worley	2 September 1990	Shayla Worley
Kim Zmeskal	6 February 1976	Kim Zmeskal

Uzbekistan
Gymnast	Birth date	FIG listing
Dildora Aripova	29 January 2004	Dildora Aripova
Oksana Chusovitina	19 June 1975	Oksana Chusovitina
Rozalia Galiyeva	28 April 1977	Rozalia Galiyeva
Ominakhon Khalilova	15 December 1998	Ominakhon Khalilova
Anastasiya Miroshnichenko	30 March 2004	Anastasiya Miroshnichenko

== See also ==
- List of gymnasts
- International Gymnastics Hall of Fame
- List of Olympic medalists in gymnastics (women)
- List of current female artistic gymnasts
