= 2025 FIG Artistic Gymnastics World Cup series =

International gymnastics contest

FIG Artistic Gymnastics World Cup series
- Location: various — see locations
- Date: February 20 – September 28, 2025 see schedule

The 2025 FIG World Cup circuit in Artistic Gymnastics is a series of competitions officially organized and promoted by the International Gymnastics Federation (FIG).

== Schedule ==
=== World Cup series ===
Date	Location	Event	Type
February 20–23	(Germany) Cottbus	FIG World Cup 2025	C III – Apparatus
March 6–9	(Azerbaijan) Baku	FIG World Cup 2025	C III – Apparatus
March 20–23	(Turkey) Antalya	FIG World Cup 2025	C III – Apparatus
April 10–13	(Croatia) Osijek	FIG World Cup 2025	C III – Apparatus
April 16–19	(Qatar) Doha	FIG World Cup 2025	C III – Apparatus
April 25–28	(Egypt) Cairo	FIG World Cup 2025	C III – Apparatus

=== World Challenge Cup series ===
Date	Location	Event	Type
May 8–11	(Bulgaria) Varna	FIG World Challenge Cup 2025	C III – Apparatus
May 15–18	(Slovenia) Koper	FIG World Challenge Cup 2025	C III – Apparatus
June 18–21	(Uzbekistan) Tashkent	FIG World Challenge Cup 2025	C III – Apparatus
September 13–14	(France) Paris	FIG World Challenge Cup 2025	C III – Apparatus
September 26–28	(Hungary) Szombathely	FIG World Challenge Cup 2025	C III – Apparatus

== Series winners ==
Apparatus	Apparatus World Cup	World Challenge Cup
Apparatus	Winner	
Men
Floor Exercise	(Kazakhstan) Milad Karimi	(Israel) Artem Dolgopyat
Pommel Horse	(Armenia) Hamlet Manukyan	(Kazakhstan) Zeinolla Idrissov
Rings	(Azerbaijan) Nikita Simonov	(Argentina) Daniel Villafañe
Vault	(Armenia) Artur Davtyan	(Chinese Taipei) Tseng Wei-sheng
Parallel Bars	(Ukraine) Nazar Chepurnyi	(Turkey) Ferhat Arıcan
Horizontal Bar	(Kazakhstan) Milad Karimi	(Turkey) Mert Efe Kılıçer
Women
Vault	(Slovenia) Teja Belak	(Bulgaria) Valentina Georgieva
Uneven Bars	(Slovenia) Lucija Hribar	(Algeria) Kaylia Nemour
Balance Beam	(Hungary) Gréta Mayer	(Ukraine) Marianna Kiniuk
Floor Exercise	(United States) Jayla Hang	(Croatia) Antea Šikić Kaučič

== Medalists ==
=== Men ===
==== World Cup series ====
Competition	Event	Gold	Silver	Bronze
Cottbus	Floor Exercise	(Kazakhstan) Milad Karimi	(Japan) Kazuki Minami	(Italy) Niccolo Vannucchi
Cottbus	Pommel Horse	(Chinese Taipei) Shiao Yu-jan	(Jordan) Ahmad Abu Al-Soud	(Italy) Edoardo De Rosa
Cottbus	Rings	(Armenia) Vahagn Davtyan	(Azerbaijan) Nikita Simonov	(Turkey) Mehmet Ayberk Koşak
Cottbus	Vault	(Armenia) Artur Davtyan	(Ukraine) Nazar Chepurnyi	(Italy) Niccolo Vannucchi
Cottbus	Parallel Bars	(Japan) Kaito Sugimoto	(Ukraine) Nazar Chepurnyi	(Netherlands) Jermain Grünberg
Cottbus	Horizontal Bar	(Japan) Shohei Kawakami	(Lithuania) Robert Tvorogal	(Turkey) Mert Efe Kılıçer
Baku	Floor Exercise	(Authorised Neutral Athletes) Yahor Sharamkou	(Kazakhstan) Milad Karimi	(Ukraine) Nazar Chepurnyi
Baku	Pommel Horse	(United States) Brandon Dang	(United States) Patrick Hoopes	(Kazakhstan) Zeinolla Idrissov
Baku	Rings	(Azerbaijan) Nikita Simonov	(China) Meng Zhiwei	(United States) Alex Diab
Baku	Vault	(Ukraine) Nazar Chepurnyi	(China) Huang Mingqi	(Authorised Neutral Athletes) Yahor Sharamkou
Baku	Parallel Bars	(Japan) Kazuki Matsumi	(Kazakhstan) Dmitriy Patanin	(Serbia) Petar Vefić
Baku	Horizontal Bar	(Japan) Kazuki Matsumi	(Belgium) Noah Kuavita	(Japan) Kenta Chiba
Antalya	Floor Exercise	(United States) Taylor Burkhart	(Slovenia) Anze Hribar	(Japan) Tanida Masaharu
Antalya	Pommel Horse	(Kazakhstan) Nariman Kurbanov	(Kazakhstan) Zeinolla Idrissov	(Jordan) Ahmad Abu Al-Soud
Antalya	Rings	(China) Lan Xingyu	(Azerbaijan) Nikita Simonov	(Turkey) Mehmet Ayberk Koşak
Antalya	Vault	(Armenia) Artur Davtyan	(Authorised Neutral Athletes) Yahor Sharamkou	(Norway) Sebastian Sponevik
Antalya	Parallel Bars	(Turkey) Ferhat Arıcan	(Uzbekistan) Rasuljon Abdurakhimov	(Japan) Yusuke Tanaka
Antalya	Horizontal Bar	(Croatia) Tin Srbić	(China) Liao Jialei	(Japan) Yusuke Tanaka
Osijek	Floor Exercise	(Israel) Artem Dolgopyat	(United States) Jun Iwai	(Kazakhstan) Milad Karimi
Osijek	Pommel Horse	(Armenia) Hamlet Manukyan	(China) Gao Tianlong	(Kazakhstan) Nariman Kurbanov
Osijek	Rings	(Turkey) Adem Asil	(Azerbaijan) Nikita Simanov	(Armenia) Artur Avetisyan
Osijek	Vault	(Croatia) Aurel Benović	(United Kingdom) Harry Hepworth	(Armenia) Artur Davtyan
Osijek	Parallel Bars	(Israel) Ron Pyatov	(Italy) Lorenzo Minh Casali	(Turkey) Ferhat Arıcan
Osijek	Horizontal Bar	(Kazakhstan) Milad Karimi	(Israel) Alexander Myakinin	(China) Xie Chenyi
Doha	Floor Exercise	(Kazakhstan) Milad Karimi	(Kazakhstan) Altynkhan Temirbek	(United Kingdom) Sam Mostowfi
Doha	Pommel Horse	(Armenia) Hamlet Manukyan	(China) Hong Yanming	(Kazakhstan) Nariman Kurbanov
Doha	Rings	(China) You Hao	(Armenia) Vahagn Davtyan	(Armenia) Artur Avetisyan
Doha	Vault	(Armenia) Artur Davtyan	(Ukraine) Nazar Chepurnyi	(Turkey) Emirhan Kartin
Doha	Parallel Bars	(Ukraine) Nazar Chepurnyi	(Australia) Jesse Moore	(Switzerland) Matteo Giubellini
Doha	Horizontal Bar	(Kazakhstan) Milad Karimi	(Chinese Taipei) Tang Chia-hung	(China) Tang Qi
Cairo	Floor Exercise	(Kazakhstan) Milad Karimi	(Bulgaria) Eddie Penev	(Ukraine) Nazar Chepurnyi
Cairo	Pommel Horse	(Armenia) Hamlet Manukyan	(Italy) Gabriele Targhetta	(United States) Patrick Hoopes
Cairo	Rings	(Armenia) Artur Avetisyan	(Azerbaijan) Nikita Simonov	(Egypt) Omar Mohamed
Cairo	Vault	(Armenia) Artur Davtyan	(Ukraine) Nazar Chepurnyi	(Uzbekistan) Abdulaziz Mirvaliev
Cairo	Parallel Bars	(Egypt) Omar Mohamed	(Switzerland) Noe Seifert	(Uzbekistan) Rasuljon Abdurakhimov
Cairo	Horizontal Bar	(Kazakhstan) Milad Karimi	(Cyprus) Marios Georgiou	(Switzerland) Noe Seifert

==== World Challenge Cup series ====
Competition	Event	Gold	Silver	Bronze
Varna	Floor Exercise	(Bulgaria) Eddie Penev	(Bulgaria) Kevin Penev	(Australia) Marcus Casamento
Varna	Pommel Horse	(Vietnam) Đặng Ngọc Xuân Thiện	(Kazakhstan) Zeinolla Idrissov	(Uzbekistan) Abdulla Azimov
Varna	Rings	(Turkey) Adem Asil	(Vietnam) Nguyễn Văn Khánh Phong	(Argentina) Daniel Villafañe
Varna	Vault	(Chinese Taipei) Tseng Wei-sheng	(Norway) Sebastian Sponevik	(Bulgaria) Eddie Penev
Varna	Parallel Bars	(Turkey) Ferhat Arıcan	(Germany) Nils Dunkel	(Uzbekistan) Khabibullo Ergashev
Varna	Horizontal Bar	(Lithuania) Robert Tvorogal	(Cyprus) Marios Georgiou	(Turkey) Adem Asil
Koper	Floor Exercise	(Chinese Taipei) Chiou Min-han	(Slovenia) Anže Hribar	(Italy) Filippo Castellaro
Koper	Pommel Horse	(Kazakhstan) Diyas Toishybek	(Kazakhstan) Zeinolla Idrissov	(Albania) Matvei Petrov
Koper	Rings	(Turkey) İbrahim Çolak	(Turkey) Yunus Gundogdu	(Chinese Taipei) Wang Yi-hsiang
Koper	Vault	(Chinese Taipei) Tseng Wei-sheng	(Czech Republic) Ondřej Kalný	(Slovenia) Beno Kunst
Koper	Parallel Bars	(France) Cameron-Lie Bernard	(Turkey) İbrahim Çolak	(Spain) Néstor Abad
Koper	Horizontal Bar	(Brazil) Lucas Bitencourt	(Brazil) Patrick Sampaio	(Italy) Manuel Berettera
Tashkent	Floor Exercise	(Uzbekistan) Abdulaziz Mirvaliev	(Uzbekistan) Khumoyun Islomov	(Armenia) Armen Petrosyan
Tashkent	Pommel Horse	(Armenia) Mamikon Khachatryan	(Uzbekistan) Ravshan Kamiljanov	(Ukraine) Igor Dyshuk
Tashkent	Rings	(Uzbekistan) Akhrorkhon Temirkhonov	(Turkey) Mehmet Ayberk Koşak	(Chinese Taipei) Wang Yi-hsiang
Tashkent	Vault	(Uzbekistan) Abdulaziz Mirvaliev	(Chinese Taipei) Tseng Wei-sheng	(Bulgaria) Daniel Trifonov
Tashkent	Parallel Bars	(Uzbekistan) Akhrorkhon Temirkhonov	(Kazakhstan) Ilyas Azizov	(Kazakhstan) Dmitriy Patanin
Tashkent	Horizontal Bar	(Turkey) Mert Efe Kılıçer	(Bulgaria) Daniel Trifonov	(Armenia) Robert Gyulumyan
Paris	Floor Exercise	(Israel) Artem Dolgopyat	(Authorised Neutral Athletes) Yahor Sharamkou	(France) Nicolas Diez
Paris	Pommel Horse	(Kazakhstan) Nariman Kurbanov	(Armenia) Hamlet Manukyan	(Italy) Gabriele Targhetta
Paris	Rings	(Belgium) Glen Cuyle	(Japan) Kiichi Kaneta	(United Kingdom) Joe Fraser
Paris	Vault	(Italy) Thomas Grasso	(Chinese Taipei) Tseng Wei-sheng	(Norway) Sebastian Sponevik
Paris	Parallel Bars	(United Kingdom) Joe Fraser	(Colombia) Ángel Barajas	(Switzerland) Florian Langenegger
Paris	Horizontal Bar	(Italy) Carlo Macchini	(France) Kevin Carvalho	(Chinese Taipei) Tang Chia-hung
Szombathely	Floor Exercise	(Kazakhstan) Dmitriy Patanin	(Bulgaria) Kevin Penev	(Israel) Artem Dolgopyat
Szombathely	Pommel Horse	(Turkey) Ferhat Arıcan	(Hungary) Krisztofer Mészáros	(Latvia) Dmitrijs Mickevics
Szombathely	Rings	(Turkey) Mehmet Ayberk Koşak	(Argentina) Daniel Villafañe	(Ukraine) Bohdan Suprun
Szombathely	Vault	(Cyprus) Neofytos Kyriakou	(Hungary) Szilard Zavory	(Bulgaria) Eddie Penev
Szombathely	Parallel Bars	(Turkey) Ferhat Arıcan	(Brazil) Caio Souza	(Hungary) Krisztofer Mészáros
Szombathely	Horizontal Bar	(Kazakhstan) Milad Karimi	(Colombia) Ángel Barajas	(Chile) Luciano Letelier

=== Women ===
==== World Cup series ====
Competition	Event	Gold	Silver	Bronze
Cottbus	Vault	(Slovenia) Teja Belak	(Slovenia) Tjaša Kysselef	(Uzbekistan) Oksana Chusovitina
Cottbus	Uneven Bars	(China) Zhang Kexin	(United Kingdom) Charlotte Booth	(Japan) Chiharu Yamada
Cottbus	Balance Beam	(China) Zhou Yaqin	(China) Zhang Kexin	(Japan) Chiharu Yamada
Cottbus	Floor Exercise	(China) Zhang Yihan	(Israel) Lihie Raz	(China) Zhang Kexin
Baku	Vault	(Uzbekistan) Oksana Chusovitina	(Slovenia) Teja Belak	(Slovenia) Tjaša Kysselef
Baku	Uneven Bars	(Authorised Neutral Athletes) Alena Tsitavets	(Slovenia) Lucija Hribar	(Japan) Ayu Tokutsugi
Baku	Balance Beam	(Japan) Haruka Nakamura	(China) Chu Yiming	(Hungary) Gréta Mayer
Baku	Floor Exercise	(Japan) Rina Kishi	(Japan) Ayu Tokutsugi	(China) Chu Yiming
Antalya	Vault	(United States) Jayla Hang	(United States) Claire Pease	(India) Pranati Nayak
Antalya	Uneven Bars	(China) Yang Fanyuwei	(United States) Claire Pease	(China) Tian Zhuofan
Antalya	Balance Beam	(United States) Claire Pease	(Japan) Mana Okamura	(China) Tian Zhuofan
Antalya	Floor Exercise	(Japan) Aiko Sugihara	(United States) Claire Pease	(Mexico) Michelle Pineda
Osijek	Vault	(Bulgaria) Valentina Georgieva	(China) Yu Linmin	(United States) Jayla Hang
Osijek	Uneven Bars	(China) Yang Fanyuwei	(Finland) Maisa Kuusikko	(Australia) Kate McDonald
Osijek	Balance Beam	(Netherlands) Eythora Thorsdottir	(United States) Jayla Hang	(Sweden) Jennifer Williams
Osijek	Floor Exercise	(United States) Jayla Hang	(Israel) Yali Shoshani	(Austria) Selina Kickinger
Doha	Vault	(Slovenia) Teja Belak	(Slovenia) Tjaša Kysselef	(Hungary) Gréta Mayer
Doha	Uneven Bars	(Australia) Kate McDonald	(Slovenia) Lucija Hribar	(Canada) Audrey Rousseau
Doha	Balance Beam	(Hungary) Gréta Mayer	(Croatia) Tina Zelčić	(Croatia) Christina Zwicker
Doha	Floor Exercise	(Romania) Sabrina Voinea	(Canada) Audrey Rousseau	(Hungary) Sára Péter
Cairo	Vault	(Canada) Ellie Black	(North Korea) Jo Kyong-byol	(Egypt) Judy Abdalla
Cairo	Uneven Bars	(Algeria) Kaylia Nemour	(Slovenia) Lucija Hribar	(Egypt) Judy Abdalla
Cairo	Balance Beam	(Algeria) Kaylia Nemour	(North Korea) Jo Kyong-byol	(Bulgaria) Valentina Georgieva
Cairo	Floor Exercise	(Egypt) Jana Mahmoud	(Algeria) Kaylia Nemour	(North Korea) Chon Jin A

==== World Challenge Cup series ====
Competition	Event	Gold	Silver	Bronze
Varna	Vault	(United Kingdom) Ruby Stacey	(Bulgaria) Valentina Georgieva	(Croatia) Tijana Korent
Varna	Uneven Bars	(United States) Nola Matthews	(United Kingdom) Ruby Stacey	(Luxembourg) Céleste Mordenti
Varna	Balance Beam	(Ukraine) Mariana Kiniuk	(Austria) Selina Kickinger	(Bulgaria) Nikol Stoimenova
Varna	Floor Exercise	(United States) Nola Matthews	(Austria) Charlize Moerz	(Sweden) Jennifer Williams
Koper	Vault	(Slovenia) Teja Belak	(Croatia) Tijana Korent	(United Kingdom) Abigail Roper
Koper	Uneven Bars	(Slovenia) Lucija Hribar	(Brazil) Gabriela Barbosa	(Brazil) Gabriela Bouças
Koper	Balance Beam	(United Kingdom) Georgia-Mae Fenton	(Slovenia) Lucija Hribar	(Brazil) Gabriela Bouças
Koper	Floor Exercise	(Brazil) Julia Coutinho	(Brazil) Gabriela Barbosa	(United Kingdom) Abigail Roper
Tashkent	Vault	(Bulgaria) Valentina Georgieva	(Uzbekistan) Oksana Chusovitina	(Uzbekistan) Shakhinabonu Yusufova
Tashkent	Uneven Bars	(Algeria) Kaylia Nemour	(South Africa) Naveen Daries	(Croatia) Sofia Mešter
Tashkent	Balance Beam	(Algeria) Kaylia Nemour	(Uzbekistan) Odinakhon Robidjonova	(Kazakhstan) Korkem Yerbossynkyzy
Tashkent	Floor Exercise	(Croatia) Antea Šikić Kaučič	(Iceland) Hildur Guðmundsdóttir	(Authorised Neutral Athletes) Kira Maharevich
Paris	Vault	(United Kingdom) Abigail Martin	(Germany) Karina Schönmaier	(Panama) Karla Navas
Paris	Uneven Bars	(Algeria) Kaylia Nemour	(France) Célia Serber	(France) Lorette Charpy
Paris	Balance Beam	(Authorised Neutral Athletes) Angelina Melnikova	(Switzerland) Lena Bickel	(France) Morgane Osyssek-Reimer
Paris	Floor Exercise	(Romania) Sabrina Voinea	(Authorised Neutral Athletes) Angelina Melnikova	(Finland) Kaia Tanskanen
Szombathely	Vault	(Austria) Charlize Mörz	(Hungary) Gréta Mayer	(Croatia) Tijana Korent
Szombathely	Uneven Bars	(Hungary) Zója Székely	(France) Romane Hamelin	(Brazil) Ana Luiza Lima
Szombathely	Balance Beam	(Brazil) Flávia Saraiva	(Spain) Alba Petisco	(Hungary) Gréta Mayer
Szombathely	Floor Exercise	(Romania) Denisa Golgotă	(Brazil) Julia Soares	(Brazil) Julia Coutinho

== See also ==
- 2025 FIG Rhythmic Gymnastics World Cup series
