= Thelma Aðalsteinsdóttir =

Icelandic artistic gymnast

- Full name: Thelma Aðalsteinsdóttir
- Born: 1 December 2000 (age 25) Reykjavík, Iceland

Gymnastics career
- Discipline: Women's artistic gymnastics
- Country represented: Iceland; (2014–present)
- Club: Gerpla Sports Club
- Head coach: Ferenc Kovats
Medal record
Representing Iceland
Northern European Championships
Gold medal – first place	2023 Halmstad	Uneven bars
Gold medal – first place	2024 Dublin	Vault
Gold medal – first place	2024 Dublin	Uneven bars
Gold medal – first place	2024 Dublin	Balance beam
Gold medal – first place	2024 Dublin	Floor exercise
Silver medal – second place	2017 Tórshavn	Team
Silver medal – second place	2017 Tórshavn	Uneven bars
Silver medal – second place	2024 Dublin	All-around
Bronze medal – third place	2024 Dublin	Team

Thelma Aðalsteinsdóttir (born 1 December 2000) is an Icelandic artistic gymnast. She is the 2022 and 2023 Icelandic national champion and is a five-time Northern European champion (2023, 2024).

== Early life ==
Thelma Aðalsteinsdóttir was born in Reykjavík in 2000. She studied pharmacology at the University of Iceland.

== Gymnastics career ==
=== 2017 ===
Thelma competed at the 2017 Northern European Championships in Tórshavn where she helped Iceland place second as a team. Individually she won silver on the uneven bars behind Helmi Murto of Finland.

=== 2018 ===
Thelma competed at the Nordic Championships where she helped Iceland place fourth as a team. Individually she placed tenth in the all-around and sixth on the uneven bars. Thelma next competed at the European Championships where she helped Iceland place 22nd as a team during qualifications. In October Thelma made her World Championships debut; she helped Iceland finish 36th during qualifications.

=== 2022 ===
Thelma won her first national championships title in 2022. She later competed at the Nordic Championships, winning gold on balance beam and helping Iceland place third as a team. In August Thelma competed at the European Championships where she placed 33rd in the all-around, which qualified her as an individual to compete at the upcoming World Championships. At the World Championships Thelma finished 81st overall during qualifications.

=== 2023 ===
Thelma began the 2023 season retaining her national all-around title. She next competed at the European Championships where she placed 48th in the all-around during qualifications. Although she did not advance to the final, she qualified as an individual to compete at the upcoming World Championships. In September Thelma competed at the Szombathely Challenge Cup where she qualified to the vault event final; she finished seventh.

At the World Championships Thelma finished 66th overall during qualifications, earning a personal best ranking. Thelma ended the year competing at the Northern European Championships where she won gold on the uneven bars.

== Eponymous skill ==
Apparatus	Name	Description	Difficulty (Note: Valid for the 2022–2024 Code of Points)	Added to the Code of Points
Uneven bars	Aðalsteinsdóttir	Clear hip circle forward into salto forward straddled to hang on high bar	E	2024 European Championships

== Competitive history ==
Competitive history of Thelma Aðalsteinsdóttir
Year	Event	Team	AA	VT	UB	BB	FX
2014
2014	Junior European Championships	24					
2016	Icelandic Championships		7			3rd place, bronze medalist(s)	
2016	GK Championships		7				
2016	TM Tournament			3rd place, bronze medalist(s)	5	3rd place, bronze medalist(s)	6
2016	Iceland Fall Cup		7				
2017	Icelandic Team Championships	2nd place, silver medalist(s)	11				
2017	Danish Championships (guest)		5				
2017	Icelandic Championships		8				
2017	GK Championships		6				
2017	Northern European Championships	2nd place, silver medalist(s)	16		2nd place, silver medalist(s)		
2018	Reykjavik International Games		4				
2018	Welsh Championships (guest)		3rd place, bronze medalist(s)				
2018	Icelandic Team Championships	1st place, gold medalist(s)	7				
2018	Icelandic Championships		3rd place, bronze medalist(s)	5	5	5	4
2018	GK Championships		4				
2018	Nordic Championships	4	10		6		
2018	European Championships	22					
2018	World Championships	36	105				
2018	Icelandic Fall Championships		5				
2019	Icelandic Team Championships	1st place, gold medalist(s)	2nd place, silver medalist(s)				
2019	Icelandic Championships		2nd place, silver medalist(s)		2nd place, silver medalist(s)	4	4
2019	Icelandic Fall Championships				2nd place, silver medalist(s)	3rd place, bronze medalist(s)	
2020	Icelandic Team Championships	2nd place, silver medalist(s)	3rd place, bronze medalist(s)				
2021	Icelandic Championships				1st place, gold medalist(s)	3rd place, bronze medalist(s)	
2022	GK Championships		5				
2022	Icelandic Championships		1st place, gold medalist(s)		2nd place, silver medalist(s)	2nd place, silver medalist(s)	2nd place, silver medalist(s)
2022	Nordic Championships	3rd place, bronze medalist(s)	6			1st place, gold medalist(s)	
2022	European Championships	23	33				
2022	World Championships		81				
2023	Icelandic Championships		1st place, gold medalist(s)		2nd place, silver medalist(s)	1st place, gold medalist(s)	3rd place, bronze medalist(s)
2023	European Championships	20	48				
2023	Szombathely Challenge Cup			7			
2023	World Championships		66				
2023	Northern European Championships	4	9		1st place, gold medalist(s)		
2024	Nordic Championships	1st place, gold medalist(s)	2nd place, silver medalist(s)		5	6	1st place, gold medalist(s)
2024	European Championships	22	34				
2024	Northern European Championships	3rd place, bronze medalist(s)	2nd place, silver medalist(s)	1st place, gold medalist(s)	1st place, gold medalist(s)	1st place, gold medalist(s)	1st place, gold medalist(s)
2025	Varna World Challenge Cup					6	6
2025	World Championships		55				
2026	Cairo World Cup						6
2026	Nordic Championships	3rd place, bronze medalist(s)	3rd place, bronze medalist(s)		4	2nd place, silver medalist(s)	2nd place, silver medalist(s)
2026	European Championships	22					
