= 2023 FIG Artistic Gymnastics World Cup series =

International gymnastics contest

FIG Artistic Gymnastics World Cup series
- Location: various — see locations
- Date: February 23 – September 17, 2023 see schedule

The 2023 FIG World Cup circuit in Artistic Gymnastics is a series of competitions officially organized and promoted by the International Gymnastics Federation (FIG) in 2023.

== Schedule ==
=== World Cup series ===
Date	Location	Event	Type
February 23–26	(Germany) Cottbus	FIG World Cup 2023	C III – Apparatus
March 1–4	(Qatar) Doha	FIG World Cup 2023	C III – Apparatus
March 9–12	(Azerbaijan) Baku	FIG World Cup 2023	C III – Apparatus
April 27–30	(Egypt) Cairo	FIG World Cup 2023	C III – Apparatus

=== World Challenge Cup series ===
Date	Location	Event	Type
May 25–28	(Bulgaria) Varna	FIG World Challenge Cup 2023	C III – Apparatus
June 1–4	(Israel) Tel-Aviv	FIG World Challenge Cup 2023	C III – Apparatus
June 8–11	(Croatia) Osijek	FIG World Challenge Cup 2023	C III – Apparatus
September 1–3	(Turkey) Mersin	FIG World Challenge Cup 2023	C III – Apparatus
September 8–10	(Hungary) Szombathely	FIG World Challenge Cup 2023	C III – Apparatus
September 16–17	(France) Paris	FIG World Challenge Cup 2023	C III – Apparatus

== Series winners ==
Apparatus	Apparatus World Cup	World Challenge Cup
Apparatus	Winner	
Men
Floor Exercise	(Kazakhstan) Milad Karimi	(Bulgaria) Eddie Penev
Pommel Horse	(Kazakhstan) Nariman Kurbanov	(Albania) Matvei Petrov
Rings	(Azerbaijan) Nikita Simonov	(Austria) Vinzenz Höck
Vault	(Armenia) Artur Davtyan	(Armenia) Artur Davtyan
Parallel Bars	(Ukraine) Illia Kovtun	(Hungary) Krisztofer Mészáros
Horizontal Bar	(Ukraine) Illia Kovtun	(Croatia) Tin Srbić
Women
Vault	(Uzbekistan) Oksana Chusovitina	(Australia) Georgia Godwin
Uneven Bars	(Italy) Alice D'Amato	(Slovakia) Barbora Mokošová
Balance Beam	(Italy) Giorgia Villa	(Australia) Georgia Godwin
Floor Exercise	(Italy) Alice D'Amato	(Australia) Georgia Godwin

== Medalists ==
=== Men ===
==== World Cup series ====
Competition	Event	Gold	Silver	Bronze
Cottbus	Floor Exercise	(Israel) Artem Dolgopyat	(Germany) Milan Hosseini (Japan) Kazuma Kaya	—N/a
Cottbus	Pommel Horse	(Uzbekistan) Abdulla Azimov	(Armenia) Gagik Khachikyan	(Kazakhstan) Nariman Kurbanov
Cottbus	Rings	(Greece) Eleftherios Petrounias	(Iran) Mehdi Ahmad Kohani	(Armenia) Artur Avetisyan
Cottbus	Vault	(Armenia) Artur Davtyan	(Iran) Mehdi Olfati	(Hong Kong) Shek Wai Hung
Cottbus	Parallel Bars	(Ukraine) Illia Kovtun	(Italy) Matteo Levantesi	(Philippines) Carlos Yulo
Cottbus	Horizontal Bar	(Japan) Shohei Kawakami	(Italy) Carlo Macchini	(Japan) Kazuma Kaya
Doha	Floor Exercise	(Philippines) Carlos Yulo	(Japan) Kazuki Minami	(United Kingdom) Luke Whitehouse
Doha	Pommel Horse	(Kazakhstan) Nariman Kurbanov	(Republic of Ireland) Rhys McClenaghan	(Chinese Taipei) Shiao Yu-jan
Doha	Rings	(China) Liu Yang	(Turkey) Adem Asil	(Azerbaijan) Nikita Simonov
Doha	Vault	(Armenia) Artur Davtyan	(Ukraine) Igor Radivilov	(Philippines) Carlos Yulo
Doha	Parallel Bars	(Ukraine) Illia Kovtun	(Philippines) Carlos Yulo	(Turkey) Ferhat Arıcan
Doha	Horizontal Bar	(Japan) Yuya Kamoto	(Croatia) Tin Srbić	(Egypt) Ahmed Elmaraghy
Baku	Floor Exercise	(Kazakhstan) Milad Karimi	(Ukraine) Illia Kovtun	(United States) Riley Loos
Baku	Pommel Horse	(Kazakhstan) Nariman Kurbanov	(Republic of Ireland) Rhys McClenaghan	(Albania) Matvei Petrov
Baku	Rings	(Azerbaijan) Nikita Simonov	(Iran) Mehdi Ahmad Kohani	(Austria) Vinzenz Höck
Baku	Vault	(Philippines) Carlos Yulo	(United Kingdom) Harry Hepworth	(Hong Kong) Shek Wai-hung
Baku	Parallel Bars	(Philippines) Carlos Yulo	(Ukraine) Illia Kovtun	(France) Cameron-Lie Bernard
Baku	Horizontal Bar	(Israel) Alexander Myakinin	(Japan) Kazuki Matsumi	(Croatia) Tin Srbić
Cairo	Floor Exercise	(Ukraine) Illia Kovtun	(Croatia) Aurel Benović	(Republic of Ireland) Eamon Montgomery
Cairo	Pommel Horse	(Chinese Taipei) Lee Chih-kai	(Armenia) Gagik Khachikyan	(Ukraine) Illia Kovtun (Armenia) Harutyun Merdinyan
Cairo	Rings	(Azerbaijan) Nikita Simonov	(Italy) Salvatore Maresca	(Armenia) Artur Avetisyan
Cairo	Vault	(Armenia) Artur Davtyan	(Ukraine) Nazar Chepurnyi	(Czech Republic) Ondrej Kalny
Cairo	Parallel Bars	(Ukraine) Illia Kovtun	(Egypt) Mohamed Afify	(Italy) Nicolò Mozzato
Cairo	Horizontal Bar	(Ukraine) Illia Kovtun	(Belgium) Maxime Gentges	(Netherlands) Casimir Schmidt

==== World Challenge Cup series ====
Competition	Event	Gold	Silver	Bronze
Varna	Floor Exercise	(Bulgaria) Eddie Penev	(Hungary) Botond Molnár	(Kazakhstan) Emil Akhmejanov
Varna	Pommel Horse	(Albania) Matvei Petrov	(Uzbekistan) Abdulla Azimov	(Armenia) Artur Davtyan
Varna	Rings	(Armenia) Artur Avetisyan	(Turkey) Mehmet Ayberk	(Armenia) Artur Davtyan
Varna	Vault	(Armenia) Artur Davtyan	(Norway) Sebastian Sponevik	(Serbia) Dusan Dordevic
Varna	Parallel Bars	(Uzbekistan) Rasuljon Abdurakhimov	(Bulgaria) Yordan Aleksandrov	(Netherlands) Jermain Gruenberg
Varna	Horizontal Bar	(Norway) Sofus Heggemsnes	(Bulgaria) Yordan Aleksandrov	(Hungary) Dávid Vecsernyés
Tel-Aviv	Floor Exercise	(Hungary) Krisztofer Mészáros	(Spain) Nicolau Mir	(Israel) Eliran Ioscovich
Tel-Aviv	Pommel Horse	(Israel) Eyal Indig	(Hungary) Krisztofer Mészáros	(Germany) Glenn Trebing
Tel-Aviv	Rings	(Austria) Vinzenz Höck	(Spain) Néstor Abad	(Australia) Zachary Perillo
Tel-Aviv	Vault	(Hungary) Krisztofer Mészáros	(Hungary) Botond Molnár	(Israel) Pavel Gulidov
Tel-Aviv	Parallel Bars	(Turkey) Ahmet Önder	(Hungary) Krisztofer Mészáros	(Spain) Thierno Diallo
Tel-Aviv	Horizontal Bar	(Spain) Néstor Abad	(Israel) Alexander Myakinin	(Germany) Glenn Trebing
Osijek	Floor Exercise	(Bulgaria) Eddie Penev	(Turkey) Ahmet Önder	(Hungary) Krisztofer Mészáros
Osijek	Pommel Horse	(Armenia) Gagik Khachikyan	(Armenia) Artur Davtyan	(Ukraine) Illia Kovtun
Osijek	Rings	(Armenia) Artur Avetisyan	(Brazil) Arthur Zanetti	(Brazil) Caio Souza
Osijek	Vault	(Armenia) Artur Davtyan	(Brazil) Caio Souza	(Kazakhstan) Emil Akhmejanov
Osijek	Parallel Bars	(Ukraine) Illia Kovtun	(Turkey) Ferhat Arıcan	(Brazil) Caio Souza
Osijek	Horizontal Bar	(Brazil) Caio Souza	(Brazil) Arthur Mariano	(Croatia) Tin Srbić
Mersin	Floor Exercise	(Turkey) Ahmet Önder	(United Kingdom) Cameron Lynn	(Hungary) Benedek Tomcsányi
Mersin	Pommel Horse	(Jordan) Ahmad Abu Al-Soud	(Ukraine) Oleg Verniaiev	(Finland) Oskar Kirmes
Mersin	Rings	(Azerbaijan) Nikita Simonov	(Turkey) Mehmet Koşak	(Ukraine) Igor Radivilov
Mersin	Vault	(Ukraine) Nazar Chepurnyi	(Uzbekistan) Abdulaziz Mirvaliev	(Ukraine) Igor Radivilov
Mersin	Parallel Bars	(Ukraine) Oleg Verniaiev	(Ukraine) Nazar Chepurnyi	(Turkey) Ahmet Önder
Mersin	Horizontal Bar	(Turkey) Ahmet Önder	(Croatia) Tin Srbić	(Hungary) Krisztián Balázs
Szombathely	Floor Exercise	(Hungary) Krisztofer Mészáros	(Bulgaria) Eddie Penev	(Switzerland) Luca Murabito
Szombathely	Pommel Horse	(Albania) Matvei Petrov	(Ukraine) Oleg Verniaiev	(Czech Republic) Radomir Sliž
Szombathely	Rings	(Austria) Vinzenz Höck	(Cyprus) Sokratis Pilakouris	(Argentina) Daniel Villafañe
Szombathely	Vault	(Ukraine) Nazar Chepurnyi	(Switzerland) Luca Murabito	(Hungary) Botond Molnár
Szombathely	Parallel Bars	(Ukraine) Oleg Verniaiev	(Hungary) Krisztofer Mészáros	(Ukraine) Nazar Chepurnyi
Szombathely	Horizontal Bar	(Cyprus) Ilias Georgiou	(Cyprus) Marios Georgiou	(Hungary) Krisztofer Mészáros
Paris	Floor Exercise	(Japan) Koga Hiramatsu	(France) Benjamin Osberger	(United Kingdom) Luke Whitehouse
Paris	Pommel Horse	(United Kingdom) Max Whitlock	(Republic of Ireland) Rhys McClenaghan	(Italy) Edoardo de Rosa
Paris	Rings	(United Kingdom) Courtney Tulloch (Italy) Salvatore Maresca	—N/a	(Austria) Vinzenz Höck
Paris	Vault	(United Kingdom) Harry Hepworth	(France) Leo Saladino	(Puerto Rico) José López
Paris	Parallel Bars	(Germany) Lukas Dauser	(Australia) Mitchell Morgans	(France) Cameron-Lie Bernard
Paris	Horizontal Bar	(Chinese Taipei) Tang Chia-hung	(Brazil) Arthur Mariano	(Brazil) Bernardo Actos

=== Women ===
==== World Cup series ====
Competition	Event	Gold	Silver	Bronze
Cottbus	Vault	(Italy) Manila Esposito	(United Kingdom) Ruby Evans	(Uzbekistan) Oksana Chusovitina
Cottbus	Uneven Bars	(Italy) Alice D'Amato	(Germany) Meolie Jauch	(Netherlands) Tisha Volleman
Cottbus	Balance Beam	(Japan) Mana Okamura	(Japan) Urara Ashikawa	(Portugal) Ana Filipa Martins
Cottbus	Floor Exercise	(Japan) Azuki Kokofugata	(Italy) Manila Esposito	(United Kingdom) Ruby Evans
Doha	Vault	(France) Coline Devillard	(Denmark) Camille Rasmussen	(Uzbekistan) Oksana Chusovitina
Doha	Uneven Bars	(Ukraine) Anna Lashchevska	(Sweden) Nathalie Westlund	(Japan) Serita Mikako
Doha	Balance Beam	(Romania) Sabrina Voinea	(Ukraine) Anna Lashchevska	(Germany) Emma Malewski
Doha	Floor Exercise	(Romania) Sabrina Voinea	(Japan) Chiaki Hatakeda	(Australia) Breanna Scott
Baku	Vault	(France) Coline Devillard	(Uzbekistan) Oksana Chusovitina	(China) Yu Linmin
Baku	Uneven Bars	(China) Qiu Qiyuan	(Italy) Giorgia Villa	(Netherlands) Sanna Veerman
Baku	Balance Beam	(Italy) Giorgia Villa	(France) Marine Boyer	(Ukraine) Anna Lashchevska
Baku	Floor Exercise	(France) Marine Boyer	(Italy) Arianna Belardelli	(Turkey) Sevgi Kayisoglu
Cairo	Vault	(United States) Joscelyn Roberson	(Italy) Asia D'Amato	(Panama) Hillary Heron
Cairo	Uneven Bars	(Italy) Alice D'Amato	(Italy) Giorgia Villa	(Belgium) Erika Pinxten
Cairo	Balance Beam	(Italy) Giorgia Villa	(United States) Joscelyn Roberson	(Belgium) Erika Pinxten
Cairo	Floor Exercise	(United States) Joscelyn Roberson	(Italy) Alice D'Amato	(Indonesia) Rifda Irfanaluthfi

==== World Challenge Cup series ====
Competition	Event	Gold	Silver	Bronze
Varna	Vault	(Croatia) Tijana Korent	(Hungary) Gréta Mayer	(Turkey) Bengisu Yıldız
Varna	Uneven Bars	(Hungary) Zsófia Kovács	(France) Djenna Laroui	(Slovakia) Barbora Mokošová
Varna	Balance Beam	(Hungary) Bettina Lili Czifra	(Croatia) Tina Zelčić	(Netherlands) Naomi Visser
Varna	Floor Exercise	(France) Silane Mielle	(Canada) Maddison Hajjar	(Australia) Emma Ross
Tel-Aviv	Vault	(Australia) Georgia Godwin	(Hungary) Csenge Bácskay	(France) Morgane Osyssek-Reimer
Tel-Aviv	Uneven Bars	(Slovakia) Barbora Mokošová	(Australia) Georgia Godwin	(Belgium) Margaux Dandois
Tel-Aviv	Balance Beam	(France) Marine Boyer	(Spain) Ana Pérez	(France) Léa Franceries
Tel-Aviv	Floor Exercise	(Australia) Georgia Godwin	(France) Morgane Osyssek-Reimer	(Spain) Alba Petisco
Osijek	Vault	(Australia) Georgia Godwin	(Hungary) Csenge Bácskay	(Canada) Denelle Pedrick
Osijek	Uneven Bars	(Netherlands) Naomi Visser	(Australia) Georgia Godwin	(Slovakia) Barbora Mokošová
Osijek	Balance Beam	(Australia) Georgia Godwin	(Slovakia) Barbora Mokošová	(Netherlands) Naomi Visser (Croatia) Tina Zelčić
Osijek	Floor Exercise	(Australia) Georgia Godwin	(Canada) Denelle Pedrick	(Netherlands) Floor Slooff
Mersin	Vault	(Uzbekistan) Oksana Chusovitina	(Turkey) Bengisu Yildiz	(Turkey) Ceren Biner
Mersin	Uneven Bars	(Ukraine) Anna Lashchevska	(Canada) Rose-Kaying Woo	(Croatia) Sara Šulekić
Mersin	Balance Beam	(Ukraine) Anna Lashchevska	(Canada) Rose-Kaying Woo	(Hungary) Nikolett Szilágyi
Mersin	Floor Exercise	(Turkey) Sevgi Kayisoglu	(Turkey) Bengisu Yildiz	(Slovenia) Lucija Hribar
Szombathely	Vault	(Hungary) Gréta Mayer	(Czech Republic) Alice Vlková	(India) Pranati Nayak
Szombathely	Uneven Bars	(Hungary) Zója Székely	(Ukraine) Yelyzaveta Hubareva	(Hungary) Bettina Lili Czifra
Szombathely	Balance Beam	(Ukraine) Anna Lashchevska	(Ukraine) Yelyzaveta Hubareva	(Czech Republic) Alice Vlková
Szombathely	Floor Exercise	(Czech Republic) Soňa Artamonova	(Hungary) Bettina Lili Czifra	(Czech Republic) Alice Vlková
Paris	Vault	(Mexico) Alexa Moreno	(Australia) Georgia Godwin	(France) Coline Devillard
Paris	Uneven Bars	(France) Mélanie de Jesus dos Santos	(Brazil) Rebeca Andrade	(Algeria) Kaylia Nemour
Paris	Balance Beam	(France) Marine Boyer	(Algeria) Kaylia Nemour	(Brazil) Flávia Saraiva
Paris	Floor Exercise	(France) Mélanie de Jesus dos Santos	(Brazil) Jade Barbosa	(Mexico) Alexa Moreno

== See also ==
- 2023 FIG Rhythmic Gymnastics World Cup series
