= List of trampoline gymnasts =

Trampoline gymnasts are those who participate in the sport of gymnastics, specifically trampolining. This list is of those who are considered to be notable in trampolining.

== Male ==
China
Gymnast	Dates	FIG listing
Dong Dong	13 April 1989	Dong Dong
Lu Chunlong	8 April 1989	Lu Chunlong
Dong Dong

Germany
Gymnast	Dates	FIG listing
Henrik Stehlik	29 December 1980	Henrik Stehlik

Russia
Gymnast	Dates	FIG listing
Alexander Moskalenko	4 November 1969	Alexander Moskalenko
Dmitry Ushakov	15 August 1988	Dmitry Ushakov

Ukraine
Gymnast	Dates	FIG listing
Yuri Nikitin	15 July 1978	Yuri Nikitin

== Female ==
Canada
Gymnast	Dates	FIG listing
Karen Cockburn	2 October 1980	Karen Cockburn
Rosie MacLennan	28 August 1989	Rosie MacLennan
Rosie MacLennan

China
Gymnast	Dates	FIG listing
He Wenna	19 January 1989	He Wenna
Huang Shanshan	18 January 1986	Huang Shanshan
Li Dan	19 September 1988	Li Dan

Germany
Gymnast	Dates	FIG listing
Anna Dogonadze	15 February 1973	Anna Dogonadze

Russia
Gymnast	Dates	FIG listing
Irina Karavayeva	18 May 1975	Irina Karavaeva

== See also ==
- List of gymnasts
