= Tina Zelčić =

Croatian female artistic gymnast

- Born: 2002 (age 23–24) Zagreb, Croatia

Gymnastics career
- Discipline: Women's artistic gymnastics
- Country represented: Croatia
- Club: ZTD Hrvatski Sokol
- Head coach: Marko Brez
Medal record
Representing Croatia
FIG World Cup
Event	1st	2nd	3rd
World Challenge Cup	0	4	3
Total	0	4	3

Tina Zelčić (2002) is a Croatian female artistic gymnast, balance beam specialist. She won seven medals at the World Cups so far.

She competed at the 2023 and 2025 World Championships, as well as at the 2016, 2020 and 2025 European Championships.

== Personal life ==
Tina Zelčić was born in 2002, in Zagreb.

== Gymnastics career ==
She has competed in the World Cup series since 2018. That year she suffered an elbow injury and returned to competitions in 2019.

She competed at the 2020 European Championships along with Ana Đerek, Christina Zwicker, Tijana Korent, and Petra Furač. The team finished in 6th place.

She won silver, her first medal in the World Cup series, in Varna in 2023. She won a bronze medal same year in Osijek.

In the 2024 World Cup series, Zelčić won bronze medals in Osijek and Koper.

In the 2025 World Cup series, she won silver medal in Doha. Zelčić finished 22nd in the balance beam event at the 2025 World Championship in Jakarta.

In the 2026 World Cup series, she won silver in Tashkent.
