= Emma Slevin =

Irish artistic gymnast

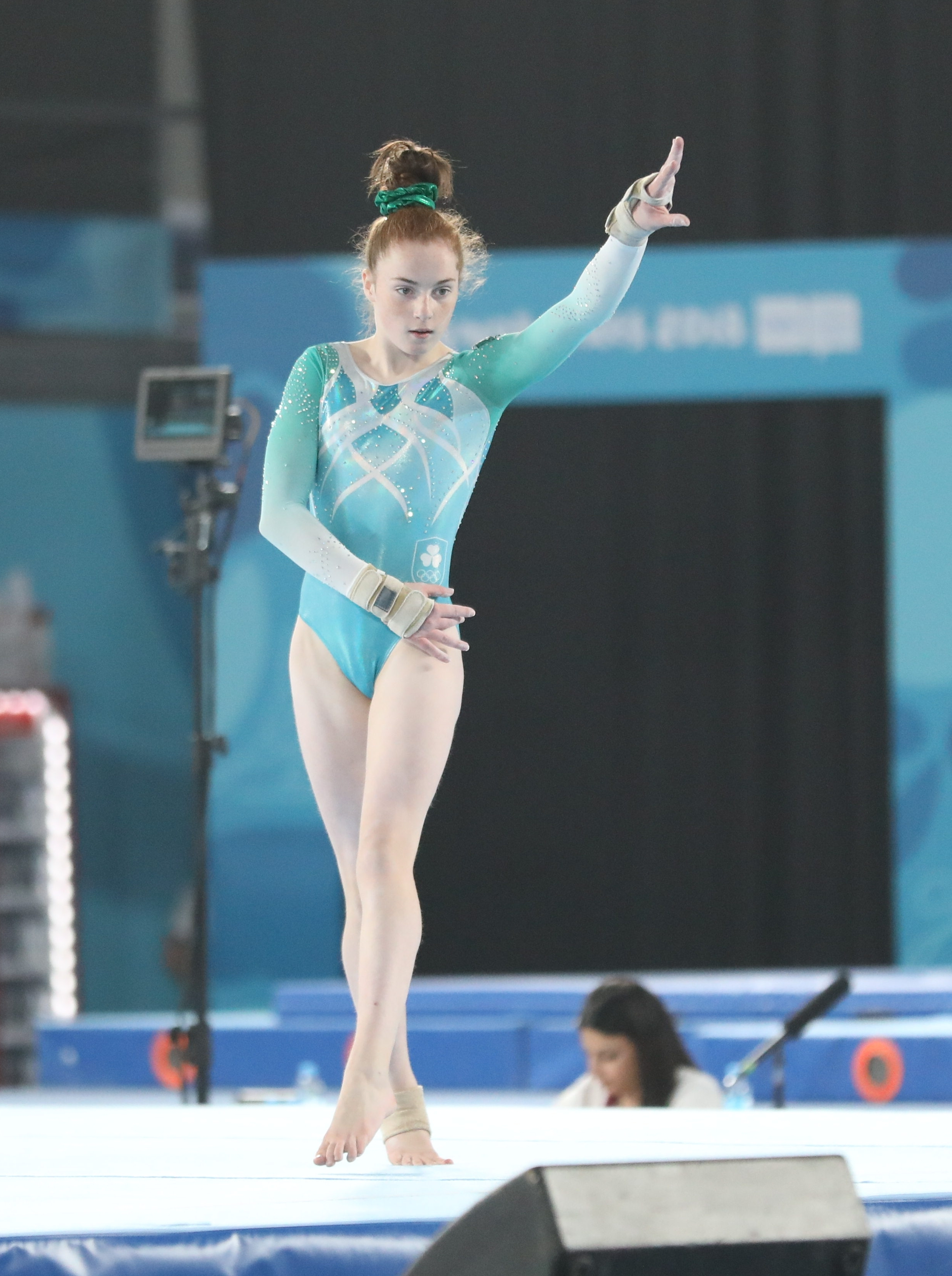
- Slevin at the 2018 Youth Olympic Games

Personal information
- Born: 2 May 2003 (age 23) Galway, Ireland

Gymnastics career
- Discipline: Women's artistic gymnastics
- Country represented: (Republic of Ireland) Ireland; (2017–present)
- College team: Minnesota Golden Gophers (2026); Arkansas Razorbacks (2027)
- Club: Renmore Gymnastics Club
- Head coach: Sally Batley
- Assistant coach: Giacomo Camiciotti
Medal record
Artistic gymnastics
Representing Ireland
Northern European Championships
Gold medal – first place	2024 Dublin	Team
Gold medal – first place	2024 Dublin	All-around
Silver medal – second place	2024 Dublin	Floor exercise
Bronze medal – third place	2024 Dublin	Uneven bars
Bronze medal – third place	2024 Dublin	Balance beam

Emma Slevin (born 2 May 2003) is an Irish artistic gymnast. She represented Ireland at the 2018 Youth Olympic Games. She was the first Irish female gymnast to qualify for a senior all-around final at the European Championships and at the World Championships, doing both in 2021. She is the 2024 Northern European all-around champion. She currently competes in NCAA gymnastics for the Arkansas Razorbacks, having previously competed for the Minnesota Golden Gophers.

== Early life ==
Emma Slevin was born on 2 May 2003 in Galway, Ireland.

== Junior gymnastics career ==
=== 2016–17 ===
Slevin competed at the 2016 Irish Championships where she placed first in the Espoir division. Additionally she placed first on balance beam, third on floor exercise, and sixth on uneven bars. At the following year's competition she competed in the junior division and placed second behind Meg Ryan. Slevin made her international debut at the 2017 Flanders International Team Challenge in Ghent where she placed 24th in the all-around and helped Ireland place seventh as a team. Slevin concluded the season competing at the European Youth Olympic Festival where she finished 47th during qualifications.

=== 2018 ===
Slevin competed at the English Championships and finished first in the junior guest division. At the Irish Championships Slevin finished first in the junior division. In June Slevin competed at the Youth Olympic Qualifier and finished 16th, thus qualifying a spot for Ireland for the 2018 Summer Youth Olympics. At the Irish Super Championships Slevin finished second on uneven bars and first on floor exercise. She competed at the European Championships but did not qualify for any event finals.

Slevin was selected to represent Ireland at the 2018 Youth Olympics, becoming the first Irish female gymnast to do so. Additionally she was selected as the Irish flag bearer for the opening ceremonies.

At the Youth Olympic Games in Buenos Aires Slevin qualified to the all-around, vault, uneven bars, and balance beam finals. In the all-around final she placed sixth. During event finals she placed eighth on both vault and uneven bars and fifth on balance beam.

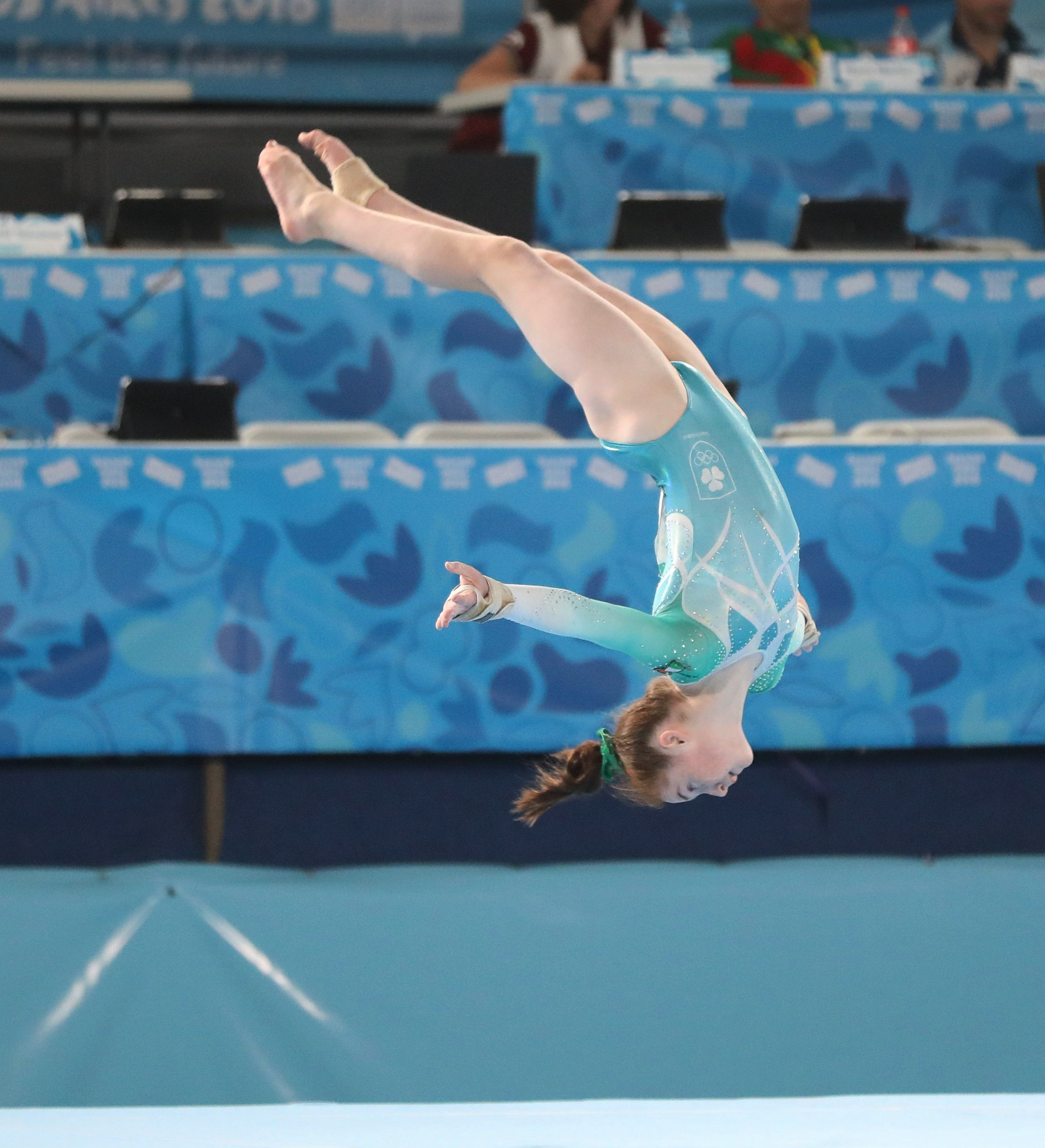
All-Around Final

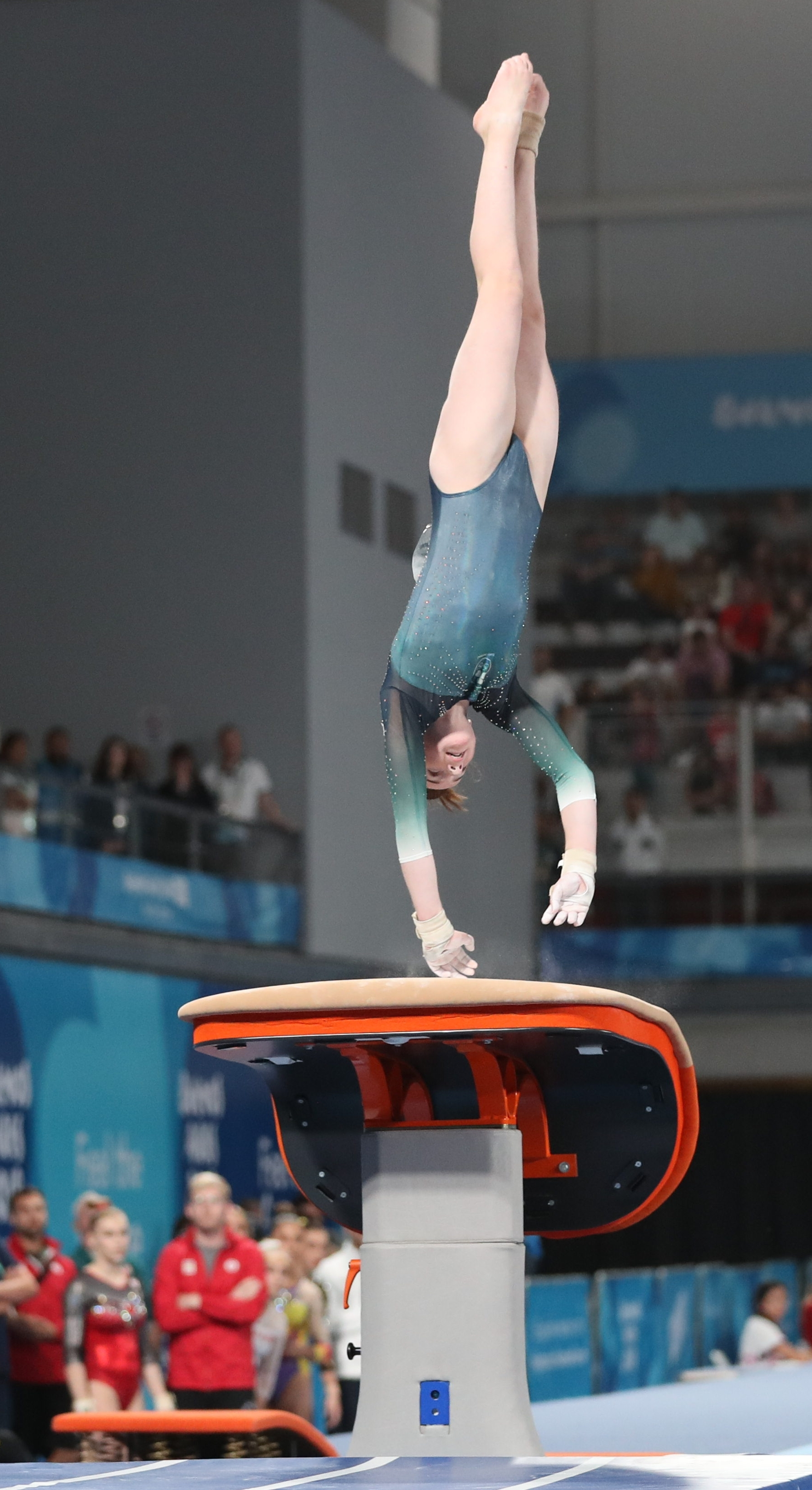
Vault Final

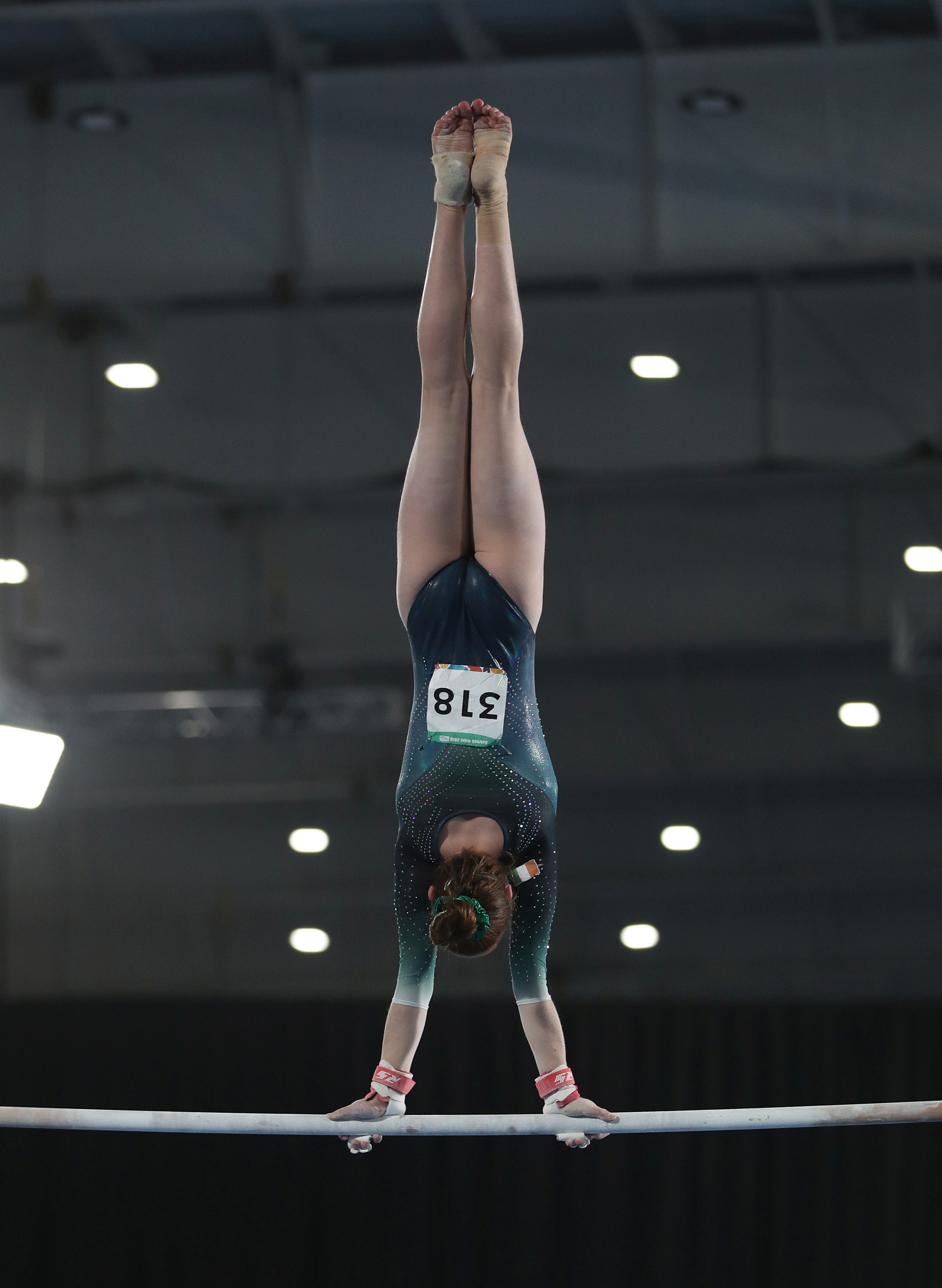
Uneven Bars Final

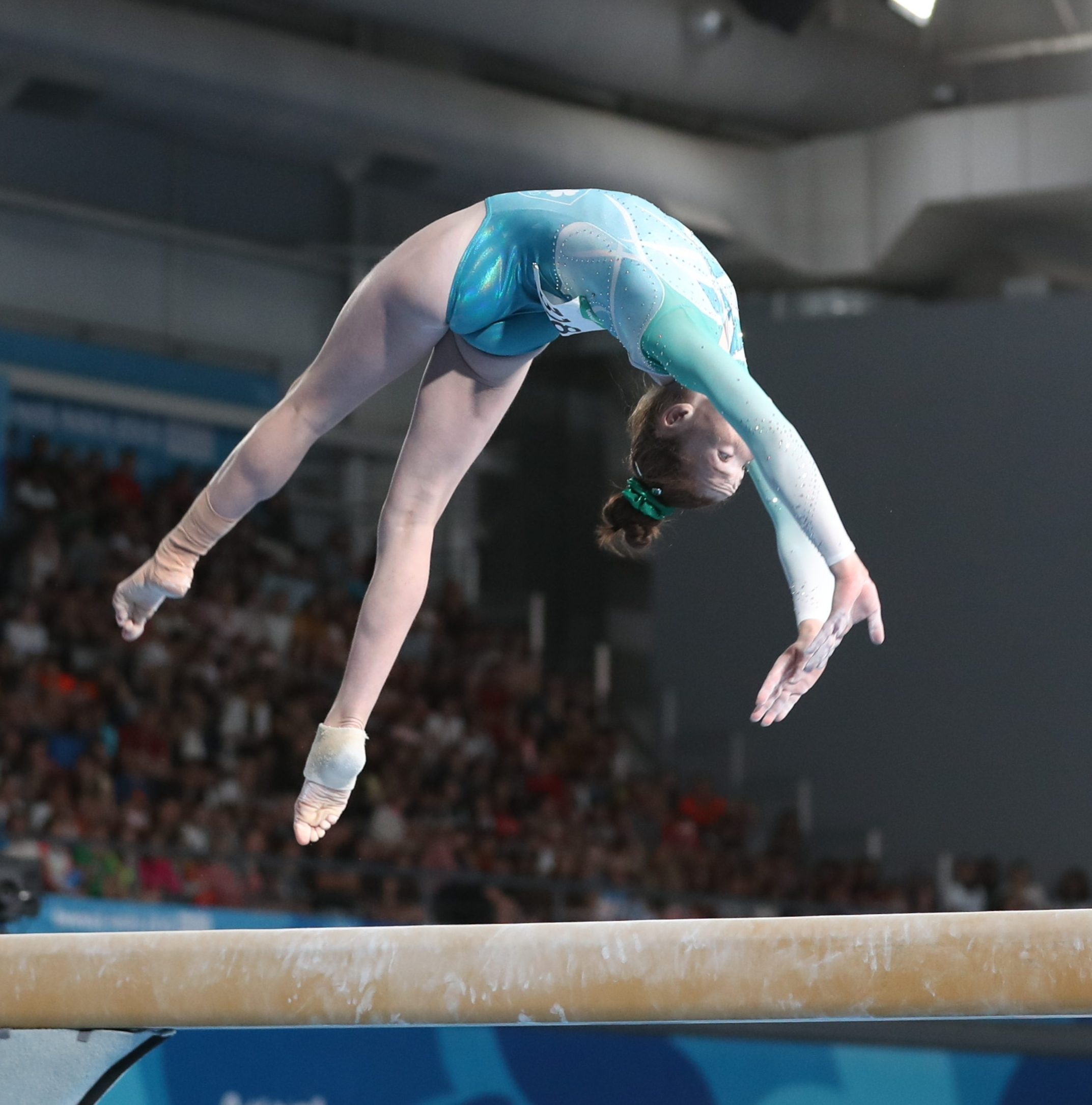
Balance Beam Final

Slevin at the 2018 Youth Olympics

== Senior gymnastics career ==
=== 2019 ===
Slevin turned senior in 2019. She competed at both the European Championships and the European Games but did not qualify for any event finals. In October she competed at the World Championships and placed 96th in the all-around during qualifications.

=== 2021 ===
In April Slevin competed at the European Championships. During qualifications she placed 27th in the all-around and qualified to the final. In doing so Slevin made history by becoming the first Irish female gymnast to qualify for a senior all-around final at any European Artistic Gymnastics Championships. She finished 19th.

In October Slevin competed at the World Championships. She placed 21st during qualifications and qualified to the all-around final. She became the first Irish female gymnast to qualify for a senior all-around final at the World Championships.

== Competitive history ==
Competitive history of Emma Slevin at the junior level
Year	Event	Team	AA	VT	UB	BB	FX
2016	Irish Championships (espoir)		1st place, gold medalist(s)		6	1st place, gold medalist(s)	3rd place, bronze medalist(s)
2017	Irish Championships		2nd place, silver medalist(s)	1st place, gold medalist(s)	2nd place, silver medalist(s)	2nd place, silver medalist(s)	2nd place, silver medalist(s)
2017	FIT Challenge	7	24				
2017	Euro Youth Olympic Festival	18					
2018	English Championships (guest)		1st place, gold medalist(s)				
2018	Irish Championships		1st place, gold medalist(s)	1st place, gold medalist(s)	2nd place, silver medalist(s)	5	2nd place, silver medalist(s)
2018	Youth Olympic Qualifier		16				
2018	Irish Super Championships				2nd place, silver medalist(s)		1st place, gold medalist(s)
2018	European Championships	15	37				
2018	Youth Olympic Games		6	8	8	5	

Competitive history of Emma Slevin at the senior level
Year	Event	Team	AA	VT	UB	BB	FX
2019
2019	European Championships		32				
2019	European Games		21				
2019	Irish Team Championships	1st place, gold medalist(s)					
2021
2021	European Championships		19				
2021	Koper Challenge Cup				8	4	
2021	World Championships		19				
2022	Irish Championships		1st place, gold medalist(s)		4	1st place, gold medalist(s)	1st place, gold medalist(s)
2022	European Championships		36				
2022	World Championships		63				
2023
2023	European Championships	18	31				
2023	Irish Championships					3rd place, bronze medalist(s)	
2023	World Championships		78				
2024
2024	European Championships	24	42				
2024	Northern European Championships	1st place, gold medalist(s)	1st place, gold medalist(s)		3rd place, bronze medalist(s)	3rd place, bronze medalist(s)	2nd place, silver medalist(s)
2025	Irish Championships				1st place, gold medalist(s)	4	
2025	Salamunov Memorial				2nd place, silver medalist(s)		
2025	Paris World Challenge Cup					4	
2026
2026	European Championships	16	22				

Competitive history of Emma Slevin at the NCAA level
Year	Event	Team	AA	VT	UB	BB	FX
2026	Big Ten Championship	3rd place, bronze medalist(s)			1st place, gold medalist(s)		
2026	NCAA Championship	4		37	27	55	
