= 2024 Northern European Gymnastics Championships =

International gymnastics competition

- Venue: Sport Ireland National Indoor Arena
- Location: Dublin, Ireland
- Start date: 20 September 2024
- End date: 22 September 2024

The 2024 Northern European Gymnastics Championships was an artistic gymnastics event held in Dublin, Ireland. The event took place between 20 and 22 September 2024.

== Medalists ==
Event	Gold	Silver	Bronze
Men
Team all-around	Norway; Joar Amblie; Sofus Heggemsnes; Jacob Karlsen; Peder Skogvang; Sebastian Sponevik; Harald Grimsrud	Ireland; Michael Carson; James Hickey; Niall Hooton; Oisin O'Connell; Michael O'Neill; Adam Steele	Sweden; Olaf Antti; Charlie Björsson; William Hyll; Filip Lidbeck; Luis Il-Sung Melander; William Sundell
Individual all-around	(Finland) Elias Koski	(Norway) Sebastian Sponevik	(Scotland) Cameron Lynn
Floor	(Scotland) Hamish Carter	(England) Ryan Owen	(Norway) Sebastian Sponevik
Pommel horse	(Sweden) William Sundell	(Finland) Elias Koski	(Wales) Elliot Vernon
Rings	(Sweden) Luis Il-Sung Melander	(Norway) Jacob Karlsen	(Finland) Elias Koski
Vault	(Norway) Sebastian Sponevik	(Wales) Henry Lewis	(Finland) Joona Reiman
Parallel bars	(Scotland) Euan McLellan	(Republic of Ireland) Niall Hooton	(Finland) Elias Koski
Horizontal bar	(Finland) Elias Koski	(Scotland) Cameron Lynn	(Norway) Joar Birkeland Amblie
Women
Team all-around	Ireland; Halle Hilton; Caoilfhionn Inglis; Eve McGibbon; Mimi Moloney; Lily Russell; Emma Slevin	Norway; Olivia Bergem; Selma Halvorsen; Christine Kubon; Keisha Lockert; Mali Neaurauter; Juliane Toessebro	Iceland; Thelma Aðalsteinsdóttir; Hildur Guðmundsdóttir; Lilja Gunnarsdóttir; Lovísa Jóhannsdóttir; Rakel Pétursdóttir; Þóranna Sveinsdóttir
Individual all-around	(Republic of Ireland) Emma Slevin	(Iceland) Thelma Aðalsteinsdóttir	(Republic of Ireland) Halle Hilton
Vault	(Iceland) Thelma Aðalsteinsdóttir	(Finland) Adeliina Siikala	(Republic of Ireland) Halle Hilton
Uneven bars	(Iceland) Thelma Aðalsteinsdóttir	(England) Mercedes Moore	(Republic of Ireland) Emma Slevin
Balance beam	(Iceland) Thelma Aðalsteinsdóttir	(Norway) Keisha Abdullah Lockert	(Republic of Ireland) Emma Slevin
Floor	(Iceland) Thelma Aðalsteinsdóttir	(Republic of Ireland) Emma Slevin	(Scotland) Lottie Smith

== Medal table ==
Rank	Nation	Gold	Silver	Bronze	Total
1	Iceland (ISL)	4	1	1	6
2	Norway (NOR)	2	4	2	8
3	Ireland (IRL)	2	3	4	9
4	Finland (FIN)	2	2	3	7
5	Scotland (SCO)	2	1	2	5
6	Sweden (SWE)	2	0	1	3
7	England (ENG)	0	2	0	2
8	Wales (WAL)	0	1	1	2
Totals (8 entries)		14	14	14	42
