= Lists of gymnasts =

Gymnasts are people who participate in the sport of gymnastics. This sport contains disciplines that include, but are not limited to:

- acrobatic gymnastics
- aerobic gymnastics
- artistic gymnastics
- rhythmic gymnastics
- trampoline gymnastics
- tumbling

This list is of those who are considered to be notable in their chosen discipline.

See gymnasium (ancient Greece) for the origin of the word gymnast from gymnastikos.

== Artistic gymnasts ==
=== MAG ===
- List of men's artistic gymnasts
- List of Olympic medalists in gymnastics (men)

=== WAG ===
- List of women's artistic gymnasts
- List of current female artistic gymnasts
- List of Olympic medalists in gymnastics (women)

== Rhythmic gymnasts ==
- List of rhythmic gymnasts

== Trampoline gymnasts ==
- List of trampoline gymnasts

== See also ==
- International Gymnastics Hall of Fame
