= Zeinolla Idrissov =

Kazakhstani artistic gymnast

- Born: 10 November 2005 (age 20)

Gymnastics career
- Discipline: Men's artistic gymnastics
- Country represented: Kazakhstan
- Head coach: Khussaanzhan Kurbanov
Medal record
Men's artistic gymnastics
Representing Kazakhstan
Junior World Championships
Bronze medal – third place	2023 Antalya	Pommel Horse
FIG World Cup
Event	1st	2nd	3rd
World Cup	0	4	2
World Challenge Cup	1	3	0
Total	1	7	2

Zeinolla Idrissov (born 10 November 2005) is a Kazakhstani artistic gymnast. He is the 2023 Junior World Championships bronze medalist on the pommel horse. At the 2025 World Championships he qualified for the pommel horse event finals.

== Competitive history ==
Competitive history of Zeinolla Idrissov
Year	Event	Team	AA	FX	PH	SR	VT	PB	HB
2022	Gymnasiade	4			1st place, gold medalist(s)	8			
2022	Wohnen Juniors Trophy				4				
2022	Voronin Cup				3rd place, bronze medalist(s)				
2023
2023	Junior World Championships				3rd place, bronze medalist(s)				
2023	Junior Asian Championships	4			1st place, gold medalist(s)				
2024	Cairo World Cup				3rd place, bronze medalist(s)				
2024	Antalya World Challenge Cup				4				
2024	Varna World Challenge Cup				6				
2024	Voronin Cup	4			1st place, gold medalist(s)				
2025	Baku World Cup				3rd place, bronze medalist(s)				
2025	Antalya World Cup				2nd place, silver medalist(s)				
2025	DTB Pokal Team Challenge	12			1st place, gold medalist(s)				
2025	Osijek World Cup				8				
2025	Doha World Cup				4				
2025	Cairo World Cup				6				
2025	Varna World Challenge Cup				2nd place, silver medalist(s)				
2025	Koper World Challenge Cup				2nd place, silver medalist(s)				
2025	Tashkent World Challenge Cup				4				
2025	Strongest Athletes Cup				2nd place, silver medalist(s)				
2025	World University Games	14			12				
2025	Paris World Challenge Cup				4				
2025	World Championships	—N/a			6				
2026	Cottbus World Cup				4				
2026	Baku World Cup				7				
2026	Antalya World Cup				2nd place, silver medalist(s)				
2026	Cairo World Cup				2nd place, silver medalist(s)				
2026	Osijek World Cup				2nd place, silver medalist(s)				
2026	Varna World Challenge Cup				6				
2026	Koper World Challenge Cup				2nd place, silver medalist(s)				
2026	Szombathely World Challenge Cup				1st place, gold medalist(s)				
