= Artur Avetisyan =

Armenian artistic gymnast

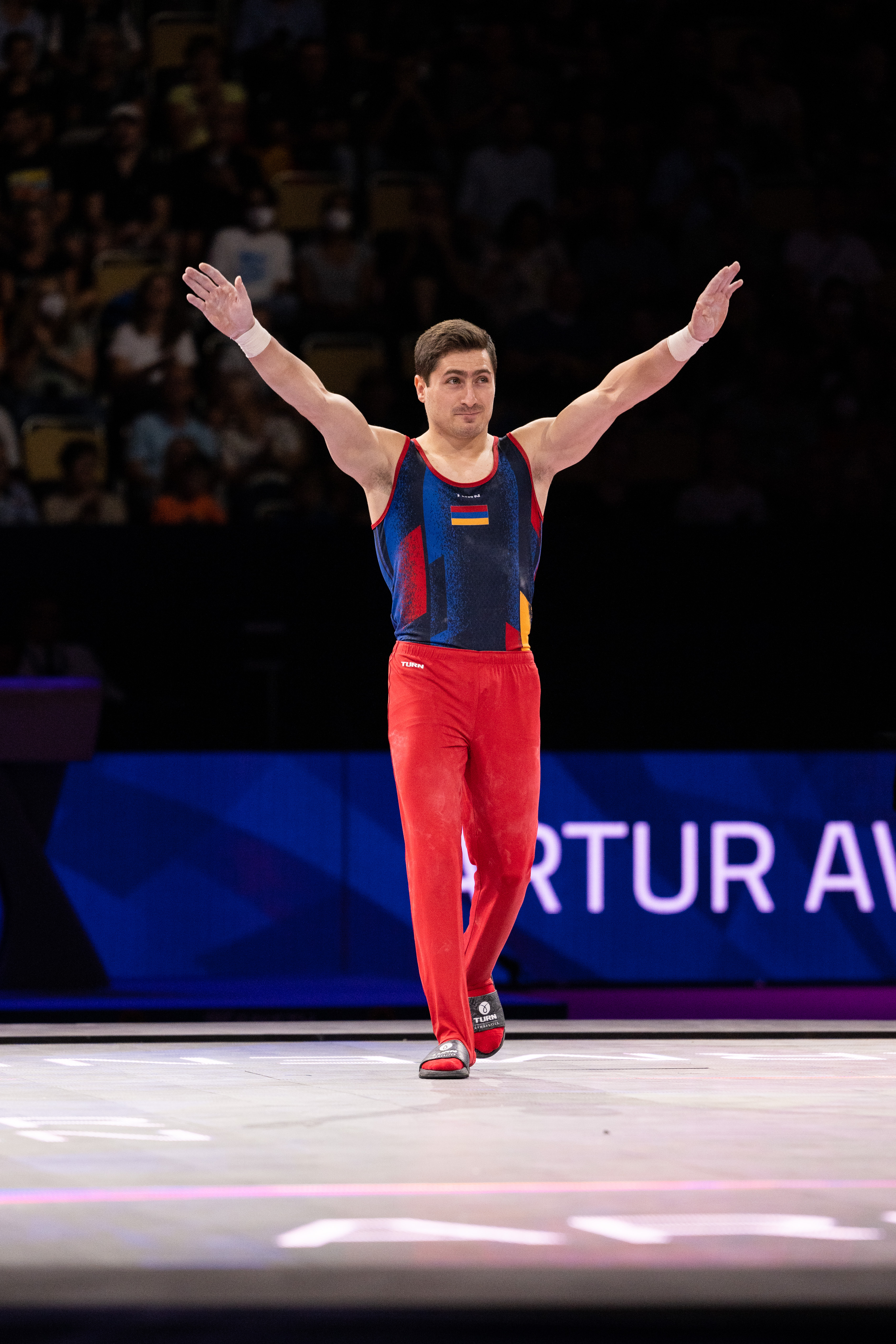
- Avetisyan at the 2022 European Championships

Personal information
- Born: 1 January 1998 (age 28) Yerevan, Armenia

Gymnastics career
- Discipline: Men's artistic gymnastics
- Country represented: Armenia; (2016–present)
- Club: Albert Azaryan School of Gymnastics
- Head coaches: Hakob Serobyan; Hayk Nazaryan
Medal record
Representing Armenia
World Championships
Bronze medal – third place	2026 Rotterdam	Rings
European Championships
Gold medal – first place	2026 Zagreb	Rings
Bronze medal – third place	2025 Leipzig	Rings
World University Games
Gold medal – first place	2019 Napoli	Rings
Military World Games
Bronze medal – third place	2019 Wuhan	Rings
FIG World Cup
Event	1st	2nd	3rd
Apparatus World Cup	2	2	6
World Challenge Cup	4	1	0
Total	6	3	6

Artur Avetisyan (Armenian: Արթուր Ավետիսյան, born January 1, 1998) is an Armenian gymnast and member of the Armenian national team. He is the 2026 World bronze medalist, 2026 European champion, and 2019 Universiade champion on rings.

== Early life ==
Artur Avetisyan was born in 1998 in Yerevan, Armenia. He took up gymnastics at the age of seven.

== Gymnastics career ==
Avetisyan competed at the 2016 Junior European Championships where he won silver on rings behind Nick Klessing of Germany.

Avetisyan had a breakout year in 2019. He won gold on rings at the 2019 Universiade and won a pair of bronze medals on rings at the 2019 Military Games and the 2019 Cottbus World Cup.

At the 2021 European Championships Avetisyan finished fourth on rings.

During the 2022 season Avetisyan won silver at the Doha World Cup behind compatriot Vahagn Davtyan. Additionally he placed eighth on rings at the European Championships and competed at his first World Championships where he finished fourth on rings, just 0.133 points behind bronze medalist Courtney Tulloch.

In 2023 Avetisyan won two bronze medals at the World Cups in Cottbus and Cairo and won two gold medals at the World Challenge Cups in Varna and Osijek. He placed seventh on rings at both the 2023 European Championships and 2023 World Championships.

Avetisyan competed at the 2024 World Cups in Cairo, Cottbus, and Doha, finishing fourth, fourth, and fifth respectively. He placed fourth on rings at the 2024 European Championships. He won gold at the World Challenge Cup in Varna.

At the 2025 World Cups he won bronze in Osijek and Doha and gold in Cairo. At the 2025 European Championships Avetisyan won his first European medal on rings, a bronze behind co-champions Adem Asil and Eleftherios Petrounias.

At the 2026 World Cups Avetisyan won gold in Cottbus and Varna, silver in Cairo, and bronze in Osijek. At the 2026 European Championships, he won gold on rings. In doing so, Avetisyan became the first gymnast to win a European title on rings for an independent Armenia. The last Armenian to win the title was Albert Azaryan at the first ever European Championships in 1955 (under the flag of the Soviet Union).

At the 2026 World Championships, Avetisyan qualified to the rings final in fourth place. During the final he scored 14.233 to win the bronze medal behind Lan Xingyu and Eleftherios Petrounias. In doing so, Avetisyan became the first person to win a World medal on rings for an independent Armenia.

== Competitive history ==
Competitive history of Artur Avetisyan
Year	Event	Team	AA	FX	PH	SR	VT	PB	HB
2016
2016	Junior European Championships					2nd place, silver medalist(s)			
2019	Summer Universiade					1st place, gold medalist(s)			
2019	Military World Games					3rd place, bronze medalist(s)			
2019	Cottbus World Cup					3rd place, bronze medalist(s)			
2021
2021	European Championships					4			
2022	Cottbus World Cup					8			
2022	Doha World Cup					2nd place, silver medalist(s)			
2022	Cairo World Cup					4			
2022	European Championships					8			
2022	World Championships					4			
2023	Cottbus World Cup					3rd place, bronze medalist(s)			
2023	Doha World Cup					4			
2023	Cairo World Cup					3rd place, bronze medalist(s)			
2023	European Championships					7			
2023	Varna World Challenge Cup					1st place, gold medalist(s)			
2023	Osijek World Challenge Cup					1st place, gold medalist(s)			
2023	World Championships					7			
2024	Cairo World Cup					4			
2024	Cottbus World Cup					4			
2024	Doha World Cup					5			
2024	Varna World Challenge Cup					1st place, gold medalist(s)			
2024	European Championships					4			
2024	Christmas Cup					1st place, gold medalist(s)			
2025	Cottbus World Cup					4			
2025	Osijek World Cup					3rd place, bronze medalist(s)			
2025	Doha World Cup					3rd place, bronze medalist(s)			
2025	Cairo World Cup					1st place, gold medalist(s)			
2025	European Championships					3rd place, bronze medalist(s)			
2025	World Championships					R3			
2026	Cottbus World Cup					1st place, gold medalist(s)			
2026	Cairo World Cup					2nd place, silver medalist(s)			
2026	Osijek World Cup					3rd place, bronze medalist(s)			
2026	Varna World Challenge Cup					1st place, gold medalist(s)			
2026	European Championships					1st place, gold medalist(s)			
2026	Paris World Challenge Cup					2nd place, silver medalist(s)			
2026	World Championships					3rd place, bronze medalist(s)			
