= Sebastian Sponevik =

Norwegian artistic gymnast (born 2005)

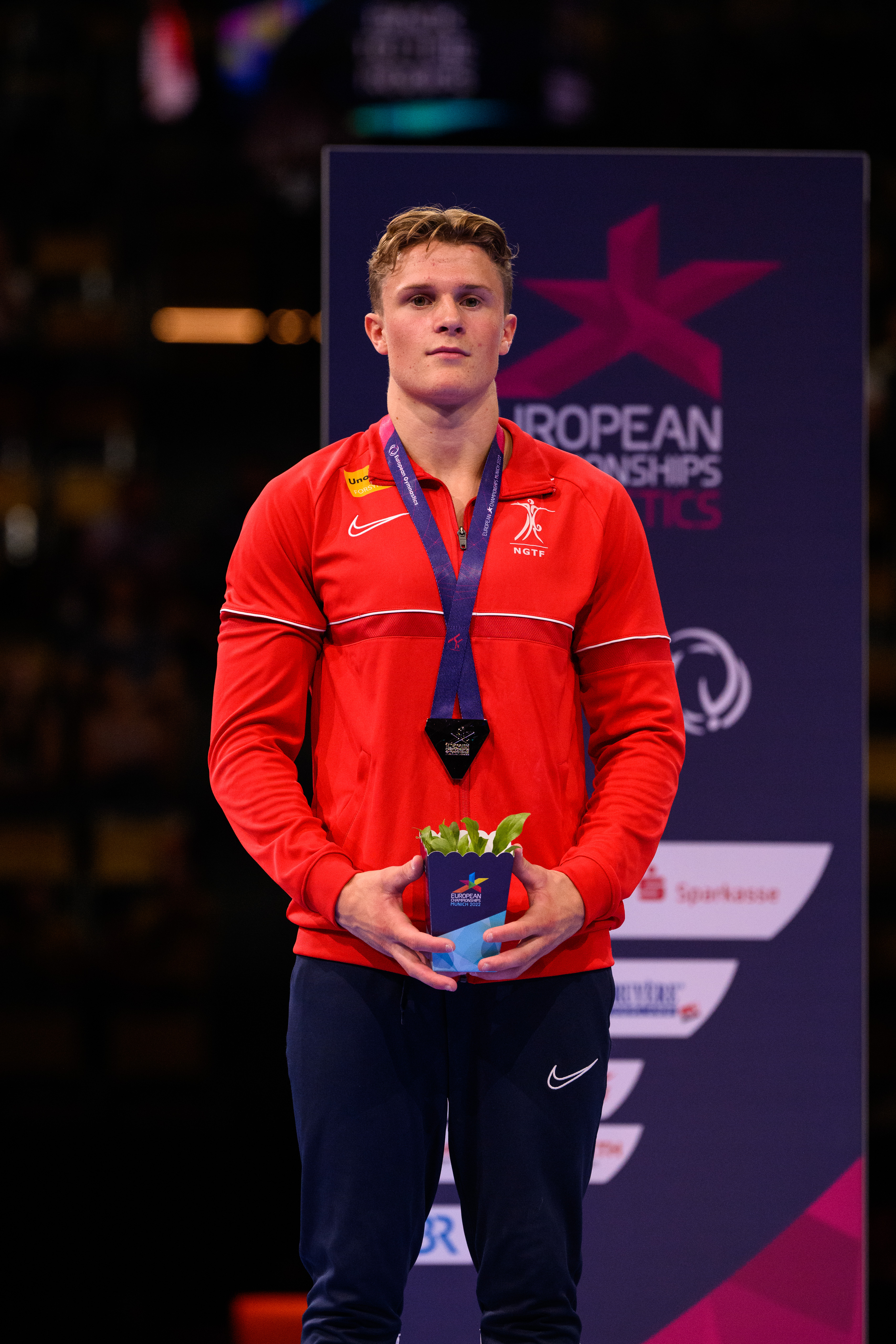
- Sponevik at the 2022 European Championships

Personal information
- Born: March 15, 2005 (age 21) Lørenskog, Akershus

Gymnastics career
- Discipline: Men's artistic gymnastics
- Country represented: Norway
- Club: Hoppensprett
- Gym: Hoppenspretthallen
- Head coach: Espen Jansen
- Assistant coach: Robert Hirsch
Medal record
Men's artistic gymnastics
Representing Norway
World Championships
Bronze medal – third place	2026 Rotterdam	Vault
Northern European Championships
Gold medal – first place	2024 Dublin	Team
Gold medal – first place	2024 Dublin	Vault
Silver medal – second place	2024 Dublin	All-around
Bronze medal – third place	2024 Dublin	Floor exercise
Junior European Championships
Silver medal – second place	2022 Munich	Vault
FIG World Cup
Event	1st	2nd	3rd
Apparatus World Cup	1	0	1
World Challenge Cup	0	2	1
Total	1	2	2

Sebastian Sponevik (born March 15, 2005) is a Norwegian artistic gymnast. He is the first Norwegian artistic gymnast to win a World Championships medal, winning bronze on vault at the 2026 edition. Additionally he is the 2022 Junior European Championships silver medalist on vault.

== Junior career ==
=== 2019 ===
In 2019, the Norwegian Gymnastics Federation (NGTF) required gymnasts competing at national events on a junior level to turn 14 the year the event was held. Thus, Sponevik debuted as a junior at the first of three competitions in the Norwegian Cup that year. He came in third at the event with a score of 70.250.

=== 2020 ===
Due to the COVID-19 pandemic, most competitions in the 2020 season were cancelled, including the first two events in the Norwegian Cup. Therefore, the only national appearances Sponevik made were the 2020 junior Norwegian championship in Tromsø and the third event in the Norwegian Cup. He won the All-Around competition at both events with 75.950 and 75.683 points respectively.

=== 2021 ===
Plagued by injuries in his tibia and wrists, Sponevik was unable to compete at competitions in early 2021. After recovering from his injuries, Sponevik went on to win the 2021 Norwegian championship at Sotra with a score of 74.500.

=== 2022 ===
Sponevik competed at the 2022 junior Norwegian championship in Kabelvåg, during which he took home every possible gold medal; All-Around, apparatus finals, and the team competition.

He also competed at the 2022 International Junior Team Cup in Berlin, and the 2022 European Olympic Youth Festival under the guidance of national team coach Robert Hirsch. At the latter competition, Sponevik attained an eighth place in the All-Around competition and a sixth place in the floor finals.

In August 2022, Sponevik competed in the 2022 European Men's Artistic Gymnastics Championships in Munich, Germany. Whilst competing in the all-around competition, Sponevik qualified for the vault final, during which he won a silver medal with an average score of 14.316. He was the first Norwegian to do so since former gymnast Åge Storhaug's European silver medal in 1965.

== Senior career ==
Though only 17 years old at the time, Sponevik competed as a senior at the 2022 Norwegian Championship in Elverum, making it his debut as a senior. At the event, which was held in June 2022, Sponevik secured a bronze for his All-Around performance, along with two gold, a silver, and a bronze in the apparatus finals.

=== 2023 ===
Sponevik competed at the 2023 FIG world challenge cup in Varna, Bulgaria alongside teammates Sofus Heggemsnes and Jacob Karlsen. Sponevik qualified among the six best vaulters, and he subsequently won a silver in the apparatus final. It was a strong competition for the Norwegian team, as Heggemsnes won the first world cup gold in Norwegian history in the high bar final, while the 18-year-old Sponevik won his first world cup medal as a first-year senior.
