= Kazuki Matsumi =

Japanese artistic gymnast

- Full name: 松見 一希
- Born: 25 August 1997 (age 29)
- Height: 1.61 m (5 ft 3 in)

Gymnastics career
- Discipline: Men's artistic gymnastics
- Country represented: Japan
- College team: Sendai University
- Club: Tokushukai
- Head coaches: Yuji Sano; Yuya Shintaku; Naoki Morichika
Medal record
Representing Japan

Kazuki Matsumi (松見 一希, Matsumi Kazuki; born 25 August 1997) is a Japanese artistic gymnast. Born in Osaka, Japan, he started gymnastics at the age of 2. Matsumi graduated from Sendai University and joined Tokushukai Gymnastics Club.

== Competitive history ==
Year	Event	Team	AA	FX	PH	SR	VT	PB	HB
2021	All Japan Championships	2nd place, silver medalist(s)	9		15				16
2021	NHK Trophy	—N/a	8						
2021	All Japan Senior Championships	1st place, gold medalist(s)	10						

== Detailed Results ==
=== 2017-2020 Code of Points ===
Year	Tournament	Event	Date	All Around	Floor (gymnastics)	Pommel horse	Rings (gymnastics)	Vault (gymnastics)	Parallel bars	Horizontal bar
2021	All Japan Individual All-around Championships	Qualification	16 April	84.364	14.066	14.433	13.633	14.066	14.000	14.166
2021	All Japan Individual All-around Championships	AA Final	18 April	84.865	14.700	14.266	13.566	14.200	14.133	14.000
2021	NHK Trophy		16 May	85.232	14.833	14.000	13.800	13.966	14.533	14.100
2021	All Japan Individual Events Championships	Qualification	5 June		14.166	13.766				13.200
2021	All Japan Senior Championships		23 - 26 September	83.565	14.400	12.933	13.533	14.066	14.533	14.100

== See also ==
- Japan men's national gymnastics team
