= Tijana Korent =

Croatian artistic gymnast

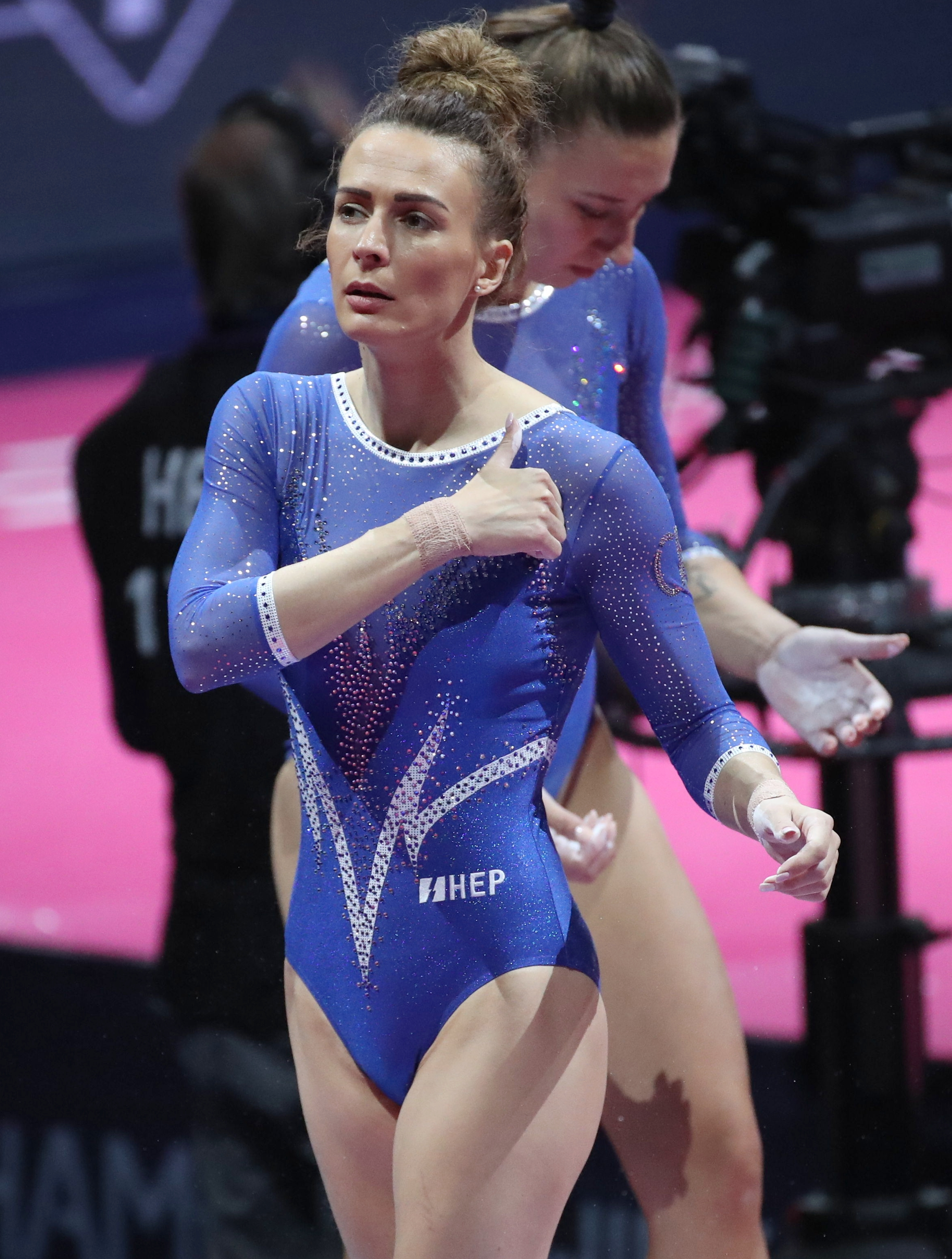
- Korent at the 2022 European Championships

Personal information
- Alternative name: Tijana Tkalčec
- Born: 27 April 1989 (age 37) Čakovec, Croatia

Gymnastics career
- Discipline: Women's artistic gymnastics
- Country represented: Croatia
- Club: GK Nedelišće
- Head coach: No current coach
Medal record
Representing Croatia
FIG World Cup
Event	1st	2nd	3rd
Apparatus World Cup	0	1	0
World Challenge Cup	2	5	7
Total	2	6	7

Tijana Korent (née Tkalčec; born 27 April 1989) is a Croatian artistic gymnast. She is a vault specialist, and she qualified for the vault event finals at the 2013 and 2020 European Championships. In 2013, she became the first Croatian female gymnast to qualify for an event final at the European Championships.

As of April 2026, she reached 55 finals in the World Cup, winning 15 medals in total. She is a 12-times finalist of the World Cup in Osijek.

== Personal life ==
Tijana Korent was born on 27 April 1989, in Čakovec. Her mother put her into gymnastics classes at the age of four. She has a degree in sports management from the Polytechnic of Medimurje in Čakovec, and she speaks English in addition to Croatian. She wants to become a gymnastics judge after she retires. She currently works as an accountant, and she frequently volunteers at a cat shelter.

== Gymnastics career ==
She competed at the 2006 World Championships where she finished 121st in the all-around with a score of 48.600. In 2007, she injured her ankle and could not compete for two years. She competed at the 2011 World Championships where she finished 18th on vault in the qualification round. She won silver (2009) and bronze (2010) at the World Cup in Osijek.

At the 2013 European Championships, she qualified to the vault event final where she finished in 8th place with a score of 13.183. This was the first time that a Croatian female gymnast had qualified for an event final at the European Championships.

During the 2019 FIG World Cup series, she won the bronze medal on vault at the World Cup in Mersin, Turkey, and the silver medal on vault at the World Cup in Guimaraes, Portugal. She qualified for the vault event final at the 2020 World Cup in Baku before the event finals were canceled due to COVID-19.

She competed at the 2020 European Championships along with Ana Đerek, Christina Zwicker, Tina Zelčić, and Petra Furač. The team finished in 6th place, and Korent finished 8th in the vault final.

At the 2022 European Championships in Munich, Korent finished sixteenth on vault during the qualification round.

She opened a 2026 season with silver at the World Cup in Baku. In May she won bronze at the World Challenge Cup in Varna, despite labrum rupture.
