= 2017 European Artistic Gymnastics Championships =

7th European Men's and Women's Artistic Gymnastics Individual Championships
- Venue: Sala Polivalentă
- Location: Cluj-Napoca, Romania
- Start date: 19 April 2017
- End date: 23 April 2017
- Nations: Members of the European Union of Gymnastics

The 7th European Men's and Women's Artistic Gymnastics Individual Championships were held from 19 to 23 April 2017 at the Polyvalent Hall in Cluj-Napoca, Romania. As usual in this format, no team competitions took place.

== Medalists ==
Event	Gold	Silver	Bronze
Men
All-around	Oleg Verniaiev (UKR)	Artur Dalaloyan (RUS)	James Hall (GBR)
Floor	Marian Drăgulescu (ROU)	Dmitrii Lankin (RUS)	Alexander Shatilov (ISR)
Pommel horse	David Belyavskiy (RUS)	Krisztián Berki (HUN)	Harutyun Merdinyan (ARM)
Rings	Eleftherios Petrounias (GRE)	Courtney Tulloch (GBR)	Ihor Radivilov (UKR)
Vault	Artur Dalaloyan (RUS)	Marian Drăgulescu (ROU)	Oleg Verniaiev (UKR)
Parallel bars	Oleg Verniaiev (UKR)	Lukas Dauser (GER)	Nikita Nagornyy (RUS)
Horizontal bar	Pablo Brägger (SUI)	Oliver Hegi (SUI)	David Belyavskiy (RUS)
Women
All-around	Ellie Downie (GBR)	Zsófia Kovács (HUN)	Mélanie de Jesus dos Santos (FRA)
Vault	Coline Devillard (FRA)	Ellie Downie (GBR)	Boglárka Dévai (HUN)
Uneven bars	Nina Derwael (BEL)	Elena Eremina (RUS)	Ellie Downie (GBR); Elisabeth Seitz (GER)
Balance beam	Cătălina Ponor (ROU)	Eythora Thorsdottir (NED)	Larisa Iordache (ROU)
Floor	Angelina Melnikova (RUS)	Ellie Downie (GBR)	Eythora Thorsdottir (NED)

=== Medal table ===
==== Combined ====
Rank	Nation	Gold	Silver	Bronze	Total
1	Russia (RUS)	3	3	2	8
2	Romania (ROU)	2	1	1	4
3	Ukraine (UKR)	2	0	2	4
4	Great Britain (GBR)	1	3	2	6
5	Switzerland (SUI)	1	1	0	2
6	France (FRA)	1	0	1	2
7	Belgium (BEL)	1	0	0	1
7	Greece (GRE)	1	0	0	1
9	Hungary (HUN)	0	2	1	3
10	Germany (GER)	0	1	1	2
10	Netherlands (NED)	0	1	1	2
12	Armenia (ARM)	0	0	1	1
12	Israel (ISR)	0	0	1	1
Totals (13 entries)		12	12	13	37

==== Men ====
Rank	Nation	Gold	Silver	Bronze	Total
1	Russia (RUS)	2	2	2	6
2	Ukraine (UKR)	2	0	2	4
3	Romania (ROU)	1	1	0	2
3	Switzerland (SUI)	1	1	0	2
5	Greece (GRE)	1	0	0	1
6	Great Britain (GBR)	0	1	1	2
7	Germany (GER)	0	1	0	1
7	Hungary (HUN)	0	1	0	1
9	Armenia (ARM)	0	0	1	1
9	Israel (ISR)	0	0	1	1
Totals (10 entries)		7	7	7	21

==== Women ====
Rank	Nation	Gold	Silver	Bronze	Total
1	Great Britain (GBR)	1	2	1	4
2	Russia (RUS)	1	1	0	2
3	France (FRA)	1	0	1	2
3	Romania (ROU)	1	0	1	2
5	Belgium (BEL)	1	0	0	1
6	Hungary (HUN)	0	1	1	2
6	Netherlands (NED)	0	1	1	2
8	Germany (GER)	0	0	1	1
Totals (8 entries)		5	5	6	16

== Men's results ==
=== Individual all-around ===
Oldest and youngest competitors

	Name	Country	Date of birth	Age
Youngest	Joe Fraser	Great Britain	6 December 1998	18 years, 4 months and 14 days
Oldest	Bart Deurloo	Netherlands	23 February 1991	26 years, 1 month and 28 days

Rank	Gymnast	Floor (gymnastics)	Pommel horse	Rings (gymnastics)	Vault (gymnastics)	Parallel bars	Horizontal bar	Total
1st place, gold medalist(s)	Oleg Verniaiev (UKR)	13.466	14.500	14.700	14.700	14.500	14.000	85.866
2nd place, silver medalist(s)	Artur Dalaloyan (RUS)	14.766	12.633	14.266	14.933	14.500	14.400	85.498
3rd place, bronze medalist(s)	James Hall (GBR)	14.266	14.166	13.800	14.166	14.166	14.100	84.664
4	Nikita Ignatyev (RUS)	13.966	13.366	14.633	13.933	13.933	14.133	83.964
5	Joe Fraser (GBR)	13.600	14.000	13.633	14.016	13.933	13.800	82.982
6	Artur Davtyan (ARM)	13.266	13.666	14.233	14.833	13.700	13.166	82.864
7	Lukas Dauser (GER)	13.700	13.100	13.600	14.266	14.700	12.833	82.199
8	Ferhat Arıcan (TUR)	13.600	13.666	12.833	13.866	14.886	13.266	82.097
9	Eddy Yusof (SUI)	13.266	12.633	13.666	14.333	14.566	13.300	81.764
10	Philipp Herder (GER)	13.566	13.666	13.333	14.166	13.933	12.641	81.305
11	Casimir Schmidt (NED)	13.866	12.800	13.566	14.333	13.700	12.733	80.998
12	Oliver Hegi (SUI)	12.666	12.000	13.233	13.166	14.666	14.500	80.231
13	Marios Georgiou (CYP)	12.300	14.366	13.400	12.433	13.800	13.900	80.199
14	Bart Deurloo (NED)	11.566	13.900	13.300	14.266	13.400	13.566	79.998
15	Yevgen Yudenkov (UKR)	13.666	12.933	14.033	13.666	13.033	12.400	79.731
16	Daan Kenis (BEL)	13.533	12.466	12.900	14.300	13.533	12.500	79.232
17	Oskar Kirmes (FIN)	13.433	12.933	12.433	13.800	13.600	12.866	79.065
18	Botond Kardos (HUN)	13.566	12.800	12.466	14.000	12.733	12.966	78.531
19	Maxime Gentges (BEL)	13.600	13.200	13.233	12.866	12.900	12.700	78.499
20	Robert Tvorogal (LTU)	12.566	11.666	13.066	13.566	13.800	12.633	77.297
21	Lorenzo Galli (ITA)	13.000	13.033	12.833	14.025	13.066	11.333	77.290
22	Ádám Babos (HUN)	13.066	13.566	12.800	13.100	13.233	11.500	77.265
23	Tomas Kuzmickas (LTU)	13.100	13.133	11.733	13.833	10.166	13.200	75.165
24	Michalis Krasias (CYP)	12.700	12.033	13.033	13.133	13.133	11.066	75.098

=== Floor ===
Oldest and youngest competitors

	Name	Country	Date of birth	Age
Youngest	Artem Dolgopyat	Israel	16 June 1997	19 years, 10 months and 6 days
Oldest	Marian Drăgulescu	Romania	18 December 1980	36 years, 4 months and 4 days

Position	Gymnast	D Score	E Score	Penalty	Total
1st place, gold medalist(s)	Marian Drăgulescu (ROU)	6.2	8.300		14.500
2nd place, silver medalist(s)	Dmitrii Lankin (RUS)	6.4	8.066		14.466
3rd place, bronze medalist(s)	Alexander Shatilov (ISR)	6.0	8.400		14.400
4	Artem Dolgopyat (ISR)	6.3	8.133	0.1	14.333
5	Dominick Cunningham (GBR)	6.0	8.300		14.300
6	Rayderley Zapata (ESP)	6.3	8.000		14.300
7	Oleg Verniaiev (UKR)	5.7	8.333		14.033
8	Pavel Bulauski (BLR)	6.1	7.666		13.766

=== Pommel horse ===
Oldest and youngest competitors

	Name	Country	Date of birth	Age
Youngest	Oleg Verniaiev	Ukraine	29 September 1993	23 years, 6 months and 24 days
Oldest	Sašo Bertoncelj	Slovenia	16 July 1984	32 years, 9 months and 6 days

Position	Gymnast	D Score	E Score	Penalty	Total
1st place, gold medalist(s)	David Belyavskiy (RUS)	6.2	8.900		15.100
2nd place, silver medalist(s)	Krisztián Berki (HUN)	6.2	9.000	0.3	14.900
3rd place, bronze medalist(s)	Harutyun Merdinyan (ARM)	6.1	8.733		14.833
4	Robert Seligman (CRO)	5.9	8.866		14.766
5	Oliver Hegi (SUI)	6.0	8.700		14.700
6	Sašo Bertoncelj (SLO)	5.4	8.033		13.433
7	Oleg Verniaiev (UKR)	5.9	7.300		13.200
8	Ferhat Arıcan (TUR)	5.9	7.066		12.966

=== Rings ===
Oldest and youngest competitors

	Name	Country	Date of birth	Age
Youngest	Dmitrii Lankin	Russia	17 April 1997	20 years and 5 days
Oldest	Vahagn Davtyan	Armenia	19 August 1988	28 years, 8 months and 3 days

Position	Gymnast	D Score	E Score	Penalty	Total
1st place, gold medalist(s)	Eleftherios Petrounias (GRE)	6.3	9.133		15.433
2nd place, silver medalist(s)	Courtney Tulloch (GBR)	6.4	8.666		15.066
3rd place, bronze medalist(s)	Ihor Radivilov (UKR)	6.3	8.733		15.033
4	Vahagn Davtyan (ARM)	6.1	8.758		14.858
5	İbrahim Çolak (TUR)	6.2	8.633		14.833
6	Konstantinos Konstantinidis (GRE)	6.0	8.666		14.666
7	Artur Tovmasyan (ARM)	6.2	8.466		14.666
8	Dmitrii Lankin (RUS)	5.9	8.566		14.466

=== Vault ===
Oldest and youngest competitors

	Name	Country	Date of birth	Age
Youngest	Zachari Hrimèche	France	17 January 1997	20 years, 3 months and 6 days
Oldest	Marian Drăgulescu	Romania	18 December 1980	36 years, 4 months and 5 days

Rank	Gymnast	D Score	E Score	Pen.	Score 1	D Score	E Score	Pen.	Score 2	Total
1st place, gold medalist(s)	Artur Dalaloyan (RUS)	5.6	9.466		15.066	5.6	9.200		14.800	14.933
2nd place, silver medalist(s)	Marian Drăgulescu (ROU)	5.6	9.066		14.666	5.8	9.000		14.800	14.733
3rd place, bronze medalist(s)	Oleg Verniaiev (UKR)	5.6	9.166		14.766	5.6	9.033	0.1	14.533	14.649
4	Zachari Hrimèche (FRA)	5.6	9.033		14.633	5.6	9.000		14.600	14.616
5	Artur Davtyan (ARM)	5.6	9.266		14.866	4.8	9.500		14.300	14.583
6	Dominick Cunningham (GBR)	5.2	8.800		14.000	5.6	8.766	0.1	14.266	14.133
7	Ihor Radivilov (UKR)	6.0	7.766	0.3	13.466	5.6	9.000		14.600	14.033
8	Andrey Medvedev (ISR)	0.0	0.000	0.1	0.000	5.6	8.266		13.466	6.733

=== Parallel bars ===
Oldest and youngest competitors

	Name	Country	Date of birth	Age
Youngest	Nikita Nagornyy	Russia	12 February 1997	20 years, 2 months and 11 days
Oldest	Marcel Nguyen	Germany	8 September 1987	29 years, 7 months and 15 days

Position	Gymnast	D Score	E Score	Penalty	Total
1st place, gold medalist(s)	Oleg Verniaiev (UKR)	6.4	9.066		15.466
2nd place, silver medalist(s)	Lukas Dauser (GER)	6.4	8.966		15.366
3rd place, bronze medalist(s)	Nikita Nagornyy (RUS)	6.4	8.866		15.266
4	David Belyavskiy (RUS)	6.4	8.833		15.233
5	Eddy Yusof (SUI)	6.0	9.000		15.000
6	Marcel Nguyen (GER)	6.5	8.300		14.800
7	Ferhat Arıcan (TUR)	6.3	8.333		14.633
8	Oliver Hegi (SUI)	5.6	6.266		11.866

=== Horizontal bar ===
Oldest and youngest competitors

	Name	Country	Date of birth	Age
Youngest	James Hall	Great Britain	6 October 1995	21 years, 6 months and 17 days
Oldest	Bart Deurloo	Netherlands	23 February 1991	26 years and 2 months

Position	Gymnast	D Score	E Score	Penalty	Total
1st place, gold medalist(s)	Pablo Brägger (SUI)	6.8	8.133		14.933
2nd place, silver medalist(s)	Oliver Hegi (SUI)	6.2	8.300		14.500
3rd place, bronze medalist(s)	David Belyavskiy (RUS)	5.7	8.666		14.366
4	James Hall (GBR)	5.7	8.633		14.333
5	Edgar Boulet (FRA)	5.8	8.533		14.333
6	Bart Deurloo (NED)	6.0	7.133		13.133
7	Anton Kovačević (CRO)	6.1	6.966		13.066
8	Oleg Verniaiev (UKR)	6.0	5.700		11.700

== Women's results ==
=== Individual all-around ===
Oldest and youngest competitors

	Name	Country	Date of birth	Age
Youngest	Lynn Genhart	Switzerland	25 November 2001	15 years, 4 months and 27 days
Oldest	Kim Bui	Germany	20 January 1989	28 years, 3 months and 1 day

Rank	Gymnast	Vault (gymnastics)	Uneven bars	Balance beam	Floor (gymnastics)	Total
1st place, gold medalist(s)	Ellie Downie (GBR)	14.566	14.300	13.066	13.833	55.765
2nd place, silver medalist(s)	Zsófia Kovács (HUN)	14.600	14.333	13.466	13.033	55.432
3rd place, bronze medalist(s)	Mélanie de Jesus dos Santos (FRA)	14.366	14.100	13.833	12.766	55.065
4	Elena Eremina (RUS)	13.966	14.300	12.700	13.300	54.266
5	Kim Bùi (GER)	13.533	14.033	12.533	13.400	53.499
6	Martina Maggio (ITA)	14.100	13.266	12.900	12.933	53.199
7	Nina Derwael (BEL)	13.533	13.600	12.733	12.966	52.832
8	Ana Filipa Martins (POR)	13.466	13.200	13.166	13.000	52.832
9	Natalia Kapitonova (RUS)	13.600	14.100	11.900	13.166	52.766
10	Alice Kinsella (GBR)	13.466	12.400	13.433	12.800	52.099
11	Tisha Volleman (NED)	14.233	12.733	12.066	12.966	51.998
12	Eythora Thorsdottir (NED)	14.100	12.366	11.966	13.533	51.965
13	Ana Pérez (ESP)	13.600	13.700	11.533	12.500	51.333
14	Ilaria Käslin (SUI)	13.266	11.900	13.033	13.066	51.265
15	Lynn Genhart (SUI)	13.200	12.566	12.833	12.666	51.265
16	Marine Boyer (FRA)	13.766	11.433	13.133	12.900	51.232
17	Barbora Mokošová (SVK)	13.633	12.700	12.266	12.466	51.065
18	Ioana Crișan (ROU)	13.366	13.000	11.566	13.100	51.032
19	Cintia Rodríguez (ESP)	12.800	12.700	12.700	12.800	51.000
20	Pauline Schäfer (GER)	13.733	11.566	13.766	11.933	50.998
21	Giada Grisetti (ITA)	13.933	13.533	11.700	11.533	50.699
22	Vendula Měrková (CZE)	12.300	12.333	12.900	12.633	50.166
23	Olivia Cîmpian (ROU)	14.266	10.541	12.366	12.933	50.106
24	Boglárka Dévai (HUN)	14.233	12.066	11.133	11.766	49.198

=== Vault ===
Oldest and youngest competitors

	Name	Country	Date of birth	Age
Youngest	Coline Devillard	France	9 October 2000	16 years, 6 months and 13 days
Oldest	Teja Belak	Slovenia	22 April 1994	23 years

Rank	Gymnast	D Score	E Score	Pen.	Score 1	D Score	E Score	Pen.	Score 2	Total
1st place, gold medalist(s)	Coline Devillard (FRA)	5.8	8.833		14.633	5.4	8.900		14.300	14.466
2nd place, silver medalist(s)	Ellie Downie (GBR)	5.4	9.000		14.400	5.2	9.100		14.300	14.350
3rd place, bronze medalist(s)	Boglárka Dévai (HUN)	5.4	9.000		14.400	5.2	9.033		14.233	14.317
4	Maria Paseka (RUS)	5.2	8.833		14.033	5.8	8.733		14.533	14.283
5	Tisha Volleman (NED)	5.4	9.000		14.400	5.2	8.900		14.100	14.250
6	Zsófia Kovács (HUN)	5.4	9.166		14.566	4.8	9.033		13.833	14.200
7	Teja Belak (SLO)	5.4	8.900		14.300	5.0	9.066		14.066	14.183
8	Angelina Melnikova (RUS)	5.4	9.000		14.400	5.2	8.700	0.3	13.600	14.000

=== Uneven bars ===
Oldest and youngest competitors

	Name	Country	Date of birth	Age
Youngest	Elena Eremina	Russia	29 July 2001	15 years, 8 months and 24 days
Oldest	Kim Bui	Germany	20 January 1989	28 years, 3 months and 2 days

Position	Gymnast	D Score	E Score	Penalty	Total
1st place, gold medalist(s)	Nina Derwael (BEL)	6.1	8.533		14.633
2nd place, silver medalist(s)	Elena Eremina (RUS)	6.0	8.300		14.300
3rd place, bronze medalist(s)	Ellie Downie (GBR)	5.9	8.233		14.133
3rd place, bronze medalist(s)	Elisabeth Seitz (GER)	5.9	8.233		14.133
5	Kim Bùi (GER)	6.0	7.900		13.900
6	Zsófia Kovács (HUN)	5.8	7.300		13.100
7	Becky Downie (GBR)	5.5	8.000	0.5	13.000
8	Mélanie de Jesus dos Santos (FRA)	4.9	6.800		11.700

=== Balance beam ===
Oldest and youngest competitors

	Name	Country	Date of birth	Age
Youngest	Marine Boyer	France	22 May 2000	16 years, 11 months and 1 day
Oldest	Cătălina Ponor	Romania	20 August 1987	29 years, 8 months and 3 days

Position	Gymnast	D Score	E Score	Penalty	Total
1st place, gold medalist(s)	Cătălina Ponor (ROU)	6.2	8.366		14.566
2nd place, silver medalist(s)	Eythora Thorsdottir (NED)	5.6	8.466		14.066
3rd place, bronze medalist(s)	Larisa Iordache (ROU)	6.0	7.966		13.966
4	Ellie Downie (GBR)	5.3	8.133		13.433
5	Sanne Wevers (NED)	5.6	7.841	0.1	13.341
6	Zsófia Kovács (HUN)	5.0	8.133		13.133
7	Marine Boyer (FRA)	5.7	7.266		12.966
8	Claudia Fragapane (GBR)	5.1	7.433		12.533
9	Tabea Alt (GER)	5.7	5.366	0.1	10.966

=== Floor ===
Oldest and youngest competitors

	Name	Country	Date of birth	Age
Youngest	Elena Eremina	Russia	29 July 2001	15 years, 8 months and 25 days
Oldest	Kim Bui	Germany	20 January 1989	28 years, 3 months and 3 days

Position	Gymnast	D Score	E Score	Penalty	Total
1st place, gold medalist(s)	Angelina Melnikova (RUS)	5.4	8.700		14.100
2nd place, silver medalist(s)	Ellie Downie (GBR)	5.4	8.666		14.066
3rd place, bronze medalist(s)	Eythora Thorsdottir (NED)	5.5	8.300	0.1	13.700
4	Kim Bùi (GER)	5.2	8.366		13.566
5	Lara Mori (ITA)	5.4	8.166		13.566
6	Pauline Schäfer (GER)	5.1	8.433		13.533
7	Claudia Fragapane (GBR)	5.5	8.333	0.3	13.533
8	Elena Eremina (RUS)	5.0	8.466		13.466

== Qualification ==
=== Women's results ===
==== Individual all-around ====
Rank	Gymnast	Vault (gymnastics)	Uneven bars	Balance beam	Floor (gymnastics)	Total	Qual.
1	(United Kingdom) Ellie Downie	14.566	14.266	13.466	13.900	56.198	Q
2	(Hungary) Zsofia Kovacs	14.483	14.366	13.200	12.833	54.882	Q
3	(Germany) Tabea Alt	14.400	13.900	13.700	12.866	54.866	Q
4	(Russia) Elena Eremina	14.466	14.466	12.133	13.633	54.698	Q
5	(Netherlands) Eythora Thorsdottir	13.466	13.533	14.233	13.366	54.598	Q
6	(Germany) Kim Bui	13.600	14.133	12.733	13.166	53.632	Q
7	(France) Melanie de Jesus dos Santos	13.800	14.100	12.533	12.900	53.333	Q
8	(Italy) Martina Maggio	14.133	13.566	12.816	12.800	53.315	Q
9	(France) Marine Boyer	13.700	12.800	13.700	12.766	52.966	Q
10	(Portugal) Filipa Martins	13.433	13.666	13.100	12.741	52.940	Q
11	(Italy) Giada Grisetti	14.100	13.433	13.033	12.366	52.932	Q
12	(Russia) Natalia Kapitonova	13.566	13.866	12.500	12.966	52.898	Q
13	(Belgium) Nina Derwael	13.466	14.566	12.133	12.300	52.465	Q
14	(Italy) Lara Mori	13.466	13.000	12.366	13.533	52.365	–
15	(Russia) Angelina Melnikova	14.366	12.025	12.633	13.233	52.257	–
16	(United Kingdom) Alice Kinsella	13.433	13.391	12.366	12.800	51.990	Q
17	(Netherlands) Tisha Volleman	14.200	12.800	11.633	13.066	51.699	Q
18	(Germany) Pauline Schaefer	13.833	12.266	12.233	13.133	51.465	–
19	(Switzerland) Ilaria Kaeslin	13.433	12.500	12.166	13.100	51.199	Q
21	(Spain) Cintia Rodriguez	12.766	12.733	12.866	12.700	51.065	Q
22	(France) Alison Lepin	13.433	12.600	12.566	12.266	50.865	–
23	(Switzerland) Lynn Genhart	13.400	12.866	12.000	12.366	50.632	Q
24	(Hungary) Boglarka Devai	14.300	12.100	11.900	12.233	50.533	Q
25	(Netherlands) Kirsten Polderman	13.600	12.058	12.233	12.600	50.491	–
26	(Romania) Olivia Cimpian	14.233	11.466	11.816	12.966	50.481	Q
27	(Slovakia) Barbora Mokosova	13.566	12.700	11.833	12.366	50.465	Q
28	(Switzerland) Fabienne Studer	13.333	12.700	12.566	11.833	50.432	–
29	(Romania) Ioana Crisan	13.600	13.033	11.000	12.566	50.199	Q
30	(Spain) Nora Fernandez	13.500	12.766	11.533	12.366	50.165	–
31	(Czech Republic) Vendula Měrková	12.300	12.516	12.666	12.466	49.948	Q
32	(Greece) Argyro Afrati	13.600	12.233	11.500	12.600	49.933	R1
33	(France) Coline Devillard	14.533	10.800	12.433	12.166	49.932	–
34	(Austria) Jasmin Mader	13.466	12.300	11.733	12.266	49.765	R2
35	(Switzerland) Thea Brogli	13.200	11.733	12.433	12.133	49.499	–
36	(Spain) Paula Raya I Artigas	13.233	12.900	11.666	11.266	49.065	–
37	(Serbia) Tamara Mrdenovic	13.200	11.700	11.933	12.200	49.033	R3
38	(Finland) Maija Leinonen	12.966	11.733	12.166	11.966	48.831	R4

==== Vault ====
Rank	Gymnast	D Score	E Score	Pen.	Score 1	D Score	E Score	Pen.	Score 2	Total	Qual.
Rank	Gymnast	Vault 1				Vault 2				Total	Qual.
1	(United Kingdom) Ellie Downie	5.400	9.166		14.566	5.200	9.100		14.300	14.433	Q
2	(Russia) Maria Paseka	5.200	8.966		14.166	5.400	9.258		14.658	14.412	Q
3	(France) Coline Devillard	5.800	8.733		14.533	5.400	8.600		14.000	14.267	Q
4	(Hungary) Boglarka Devai	5.400	8.900		14.300	5.200	8.966		14.166	14.233	Q
5	(Slovenia) Teja Belak	5.400	9.000		14.400	5.000	9.033		14.033	14.217	Q
6	(Hungary) Zsofia Kovacs	5.400	9.083		14.483	4.800	9.066		13.866	14.175	Q
7	(Russia) Angelina Melnikova	5.400	8.966		14.366	5.200	8.866	0.1	13.633	14.166	Q
8	(Netherlands) Tisha Volleman	5.400	8.800		14.200	5.200	8.533		13.733	13.967	Q
9	(Slovenia) Tjassa Kysselef	4.800	9.033		13.833	5.000	8.966		13.966	13.900	R1
10	(Poland) Gabriela Janik	4.800	8.800		13.600	4.800	9.000		13.800	13.700	R2
11	(Latvia) Valerija Grisane	4.800	8.800		13.600	4.200	9.133		13.333	13.467	R3

==== Uneven bars ====
Rank	Gymnast	D Score	E Score	Pen.	Total	Qual.
1	(Belgium) Nina Derwael	6.100	8.466		14.566	Q
1	(Germany) Elisabeth Seitz	6.100	8.466		14.566	Q
3	(Russia) Elena Eremina	6.100	8.366		14.466	Q
4	(United Kingdom) Rebecca Downie	6.100	8.333		14.433	Q
5	(Hungary) Zsofia Kovacs	6.000	8.366		14.366	Q
6	(United Kingdom) Elissa Downie	5.900	8.366		14.266	Q
7	(Germany) Kim Bui	6.000	8.133		14.133	Q
8	(France) Melanie de Jesus dos Santos	5.800	8.300		14.100	Q
9	(Germany) Tabea Alt	5.400	8.500		13.900	–
10	(Russia) Natalia Kapitonova	5.900	7.966		13.866	R1
11	(Romania) Larisa Iordache	5.800	8.033		13.833	R2
12	(Portugal) Filipa Martins	5.500	8.166		13.566	R3

==== Balance beam ====
Rank	Gymnast	D Score	E Score	Pen.	Total	Qual.
1	(Romania) Larisa Iordache	6.200	8.366		14.566	Q
2	(Netherlands) Sanne Wevers	5.900	8.400		14.300	Q
3	(Netherlands) Eythora Thorsdottir	5.800	8.433		14.233	Q
4	(Romania) Catalina Ponor	5.900	8.166		14.066	Q
5	(Germany) Tabea Alt	6.000	7.800	−0.1	13.700	Q
6	(France) Marine Boyer	5.900	7.800		13.700	Q
7	(United Kingdom) Elissa Downie	5.300	8.166		13.466	Q
8	(United Kingdom) Rebecca Downie	5.600	7.733	0.100	13.333	Q
9	(United Kingdom) Claudia Fragapane	5.100	8.100		13.200	–
9	(Hungary) Zsofia Kovacs	5.100	8.100		13.200	R1
11	(Portugal) Filipa Martins	5.400	7.700		13.100	R2
12	(Germany) Elisabeth Seitz	4.800	8.266		13.066	R3

==== Floor ====
Rank	Gymnast	D Score	E Score	Pen.	Total	Qual.
1	(United Kingdom) Elissa Downie	5.400	8.500		13.900	Q
2	(United Kingdom) Claudia Fragapane	5.500	8.266		13.766	Q
3	(Russia) Elena Eremina	5.200	8.433		13.633	Q
4	(Italy) Lara Mori	5.400	8.233		13.633	Q
5	(Netherlands) Eythora Thorsdottir	5.200	8.166		13.366	Q
6	(Russia) Angelina Melnikova	5.500	8.033	−0.3	13.233	Q
7	(Germany) Kim Bui	5.200	8.066	−0.1	13.166	Q
8	(Germany) Pauline Schaefer	5.100	8.033		13.133	Q
9	(Switzerland) Iliara Kaeslin	4.900	8.200		13.100	R1
10	(Romania) Catalina Ponor	4.900	8.166		13.066	R2
11	(Netherlands) Tisha Volleman	5.000	8.066		13.066	R3
