= 2018 European Men's Artistic Gymnastics Championships =

33rd European Men's Artistic Gymnastics Championships
- Venue: The SSE Hydro
- Location: Glasgow, Scotland, United Kingdom
- Start date: 9 August 2018
- End date: 12 August 2018

The 33rd European Men's Artistic Gymnastics Championships was held from 9 to 12 August 2018 at the SSE Hydro in Glasgow, Scotland, United Kingdom.

The competition was a portion of the first multi-sport European Championships.

== Competition schedule ==
Date	Sessions	Time	Subdivisions
Thursday 9 August	Opening ceremony		
Thursday 9 August	Senior Men's Qualification for Team Final & Individual Apparatus Finals	10:00 AM – 12:45 PM	Subdivision 1
Thursday 9 August	Senior Men's Qualification for Team Final & Individual Apparatus Finals	02:00 PM – 04:15 PM	Subdivision 2
Thursday 9 August	Senior Men's Qualification for Team Final & Individual Apparatus Finals	06:30 PM – 08:55 PM	Subdivision 3
Friday 10 August	Junior Men's Qualification for Individual Apparatus Finals and Junior Men's Team Final & All-Around Final	10:00 AM – 01:35 PM	Subdivision 1
Friday 10 August	Junior Men's Qualification for Individual Apparatus Finals and Junior Men's Team Final & All-Around Final	02:15 PM – 03:50 PM	Subdivision 2
Friday 10 August	Junior Men's Qualification for Individual Apparatus Finals and Junior Men's Team Final & All-Around Final	06:30 PM – 09:35 PM	Subdivision 3
Saturday 11 August	Senior Men's Team Final	01:00 PM – 03:25 PM	-
Sunday 12 August	Junior Men's Individual Apparatus Finals	10:00 AM – 12:55 PM	-
Sunday 12 August	Senior Men's Individual Apparatus Finals	02:30 PM – 06:30 PM	-
Sunday 12 August	Closing ceremony		

== Medals summary ==
=== Medalists ===
Event	Gold	Silver	Bronze
Senior
Team	Russia; David Belyavskiy; Artur Dalaloyan; Nikolai Kuksenkov; Dmitriy Lankin; Nikita Nagornyy	(United Kingdom) Great Britain; Joe Fraser; James Hall; Max Whitlock; Courtney Tulloch; Dominick Cunningham	France; Cyril Tommasone; Julien Gobaux; Axel Augis; Loris Frasca; Edgar Boulet
Floor	Dominick Cunningham (GBR)	Artem Dolgopyat (ISR)	Artur Dalaloyan (RUS)
Pommel horse	Rhys McClenaghan (IRL)	Robert Seligman (CRO) Sašo Bertoncelj (SLO)	—N/a
Rings	Eleftherios Petrounias (GRE)	İbrahim Çolak (TUR)	Courtney Tulloch (GBR)
Vault	Artur Dalaloyan (RUS)	Igor Radivilov (UKR)	Dmitriy Lankin (RUS)
Parallel bars	Artur Dalaloyan (RUS)	David Belyavskiy (RUS)	Oliver Hegi (SUI)
Horizontal bar	Oliver Hegi (SUI)	Epke Zonderland (NED)	Dávid Vecsernyés (HUN)
Junior
Team	Russia; Yuriy Busse; Viktor Kaliuzhin; Mikhail Khudchenko; Grigoriy Klimentev; Sergei Naidin	(United Kingdom) Great Britain; Jamie Lewis; Pavel Karnejenko; Adam Tobin; Donnell Osborne; Jake Jarman	Italy; Lay Giannini; Yumin Abbadini; Nicolò Mozzato; Ares Federici; Edoardo de Rosa
All-around	Nicolò Mozzato (ITA)	Jamie Lewis (GBR)	Sergei Naidin (RUS)
Floor	Jamie Lewis (GBR)	Nicolò Mozzato (ITA)	Sergei Naidin (RUS)
Pommel horse	Edoardo de Rosa (ITA)	Jamie Lewis (GBR)	Gagik Khachikyan (ARM)
Rings	Grigoriy Klimentev (RUS)	Viktor Kaliuzhin (RUS)	Jamie Lewis (GBR)
Vault	Sviataslau Dranitski (BLR)	Jake Jarman (GBR)	Ares Federici (ITA)
Parallel bars	Illia Kovtun (UKR)	Karim Rida (GER)	Dominic Tamsel (SUI)
Horizontal bar	Nicolò Mozzato (ITA)	Krisztián Balázs (HUN)	Daniel Wörz (GER)

=== Medal standings ===
==== Overall ====
Rank	Nation	Gold	Silver	Bronze	Total
1	Russia (RUS)	5	2	4	11
2	Italy (ITA)	3	1	2	6
3	Great Britain (GBR)	2	5	2	9
4	Ukraine (UKR)	1	1	0	2
5	Switzerland (SUI)	1	0	2	3
6	Belarus (BLR)	1	0	0	1
6	Greece (GRE)	1	0	0	1
6	Ireland (IRL)	1	0	0	1
9	Germany (GER)	0	1	1	2
9	Hungary (HUN)	0	1	1	2
11	Croatia (CRO)	0	1	0	1
11	Israel (ISR)	0	1	0	1
11	Netherlands (NED)	0	1	0	1
11	Slovenia (SLO)	0	1	0	1
11	Turkey (TUR)	0	1	0	1
16	Armenia (ARM)	0	0	1	1
16	France (FRA)	0	0	1	1
Totals (17 entries)		15	16	14	45

==== Senior ====
Rank	Nation	Gold	Silver	Bronze	Total
1	Russia (RUS)	3	1	2	6
2	Great Britain (GBR)	1	1	1	3
3	Switzerland (SUI)	1	0	1	2
4	Greece (GRE)	1	0	0	1
4	Ireland (IRL)	1	0	0	1
6	Croatia (CRO)	0	1	0	1
6	Israel (ISR)	0	1	0	1
6	Netherlands (NED)	0	1	0	1
6	Slovenia (SLO)	0	1	0	1
6	Turkey (TUR)	0	1	0	1
6	Ukraine (UKR)	0	1	0	1
12	France (FRA)	0	0	1	1
12	Hungary (HUN)	0	0	1	1
Totals (13 entries)		7	8	6	21

==== Junior ====
Rank	Nation	Gold	Silver	Bronze	Total
1	Italy (ITA)	3	1	2	6
2	Russia (RUS)	2	1	2	5
3	Great Britain (GBR)	1	4	1	6
4	Belarus (BLR)	1	0	0	1
4	Ukraine (UKR)	1	0	0	1
6	Germany (GER)	0	1	1	2
7	Hungary (HUN)	0	1	0	1
8	Armenia (ARM)	0	0	1	1
8	Switzerland (SUI)	0	0	1	1
Totals (9 entries)		8	8	8	24

== Seniors' results ==
=== Team competition ===
Oldest and youngest competitors

	Name	Country	Date of birth	Age
Youngest	Nicolau Mir	Spain	May 10, 2000	18 years, 3 months and 1 day
Oldest	Cyril Tommasone	France	July 4, 1987	31 years, 1 month and 7 days

Rank	Team	Floor (gymnastics)	Pommel horse	Rings (gymnastics)	Vault (gymnastics)	Parallel bars	Horizontal bar	Total
1st place, gold medalist(s)	Russia	42.166 (2)	42.732 (1)	42.399 (2)	44.166 (1)	45.199 (1)	40.598 (2)	257.260
1st place, gold medalist(s)	David Belyavskiy		14.266			15.466	13.066	257.260
1st place, gold medalist(s)	Artur Dalaloyan	14.633		14.633	14.500	15.433		257.260
1st place, gold medalist(s)	Nikolai Kuksenkov		14.633				13.566	257.260
1st place, gold medalist(s)	Dimitrii Lankin	14.333		13.566	14.800			257.260
1st place, gold medalist(s)	Nikita Nagornyy	13.200	13.833	14.200	14.866	14.300	13.966	257.260
2nd place, silver medalist(s)	Great Britain	42.666 (1)	42.499 (2)	41.966 (3)	43.866 (2)	44.533 (2)	37.832 (7)	253.362
2nd place, silver medalist(s)	Dominick Cunningham	14.600			14.900	14.500	11.466	253.362
2nd place, silver medalist(s)	Joe Fraser		13.800	13.400		15.233	13.900	253.362
2nd place, silver medalist(s)	James Hall	13.700	14.266	13.833	14.433	14.800	12.466	253.362
2nd place, silver medalist(s)	Courtney Tulloch			14.733	14.533			253.362
2nd place, silver medalist(s)	Max Whitlock	14.366	14.433					253.362
3rd place, bronze medalist(s)	France	40.732 (3)	41.599 (3)	40.066 (7)	42.299 (4)	42.433 (6)	39.799 (3)	246.928
3rd place, bronze medalist(s)	Axel Augis		13.733	13.133	13.366	14.433	13.433	246.928
3rd place, bronze medalist(s)	Edgar Boulet	13.433					12.933	246.928
3rd place, bronze medalist(s)	Loris Frasca	13.733		13.433	14.900	13.700		246.928
3rd place, bronze medalist(s)	Julien Gobaux	13.566	13.200	13.500	14.033	14.300	13.433	246.928
3rd place, bronze medalist(s)	Cyril Tommasone		14.666					246.928
4	Germany	40.133 (5)	39.132 (6)	41.866 (4)	40.999 (7)	42.666 (5)	38.833 (5)	243.629
4	Andreas Bretschneider	13.300	12.466		13.433	14.100	13.033	243.629
4	Nils Dunkel		13.266			13.833		243.629
4	Nick Klessing	13.200		13.633	13.100			243.629
4	Marcel Nguyen	13.633		14.333	14.466	14.733	12.800	243.629
4	Andreas Toba		13.400	13.900				243.629
5	Switzerland	39.100 (6)	40.165 (4)	37.866 (8)	41.532 (6)	45.533 (3)	41.266 (1)	243.462
5	Noe Samuel Seifert	13.000	12.066	13.133	13.866			243.462
5	Henji Mboyo	12.800		11.433		14.200	13.200	243.462
5	Oliver Hegi		14.133			15.000	14.100	243.462
5	Benjamin Gischard		13.966	13.300	14.500			243.462
5	Taha Serhani	13.300			13.166	14.333	13.966	243.462
6	Spain	40.699 (4)	35.632 (7)	41.032 (5)	42.433 (3)	41.199 (8)	38.466 (6)	239.461
6	Néstor Abad	14.033	10.066	13.700	14.100	13.166	13.466	239.461
6	Rayderley Zapata	13.966			14.000			239.461
6	Alberto Tallón		12.700	13.966				239.461
6	Nicolau Mir	12.700		13.366	14.333	14.500	11.900	239.461
6	Thierno Diallo		12.866			13.533	13.100	239.461
7	Turkey	36.799 (8)	35.000 (8)	42.598 (1)	42.199 (5)	43.199 (4)	39.566 (4)	239.361
7	Ferhat Arıcan	12.366	13.700		14.200	14.700	13.300	239.361
7	Ahmet Önder	11.833	11.300	13.966	14.466	14.766	12.466	239.361
7	Emre Gündoğdu	12.600		13.666				239.361
7	İbrahim Çolak			14.966		13.733		239.361
7	Ümit Şamiloğlu		10.000		13.533		13.800	239.361
8	Italy	37.799 (7)	39.965 (5)	40.999 (6)	26.166 (8)	41.599 (7)	35.799 (8)	222.327
8	Marco Sarrugerio			13.700	12.933	14.000		222.327
8	Tommaso De Vecchis	11.400	13.766				10.900	222.327
8	Marco Lodadio	13.033		14.233	13.233			222.327
8	Andrea Russo		12.666	13.066	0.000	13.866	11.466	222.327
8	Ludovico Edalli	13.366	13.533			13.733	13.433	222.327

=== Floor ===
Oldest and youngest competitors

	Name	Country	Date of birth	Age
Youngest	Artem Dolgopyat	Israel	June 16, 1997	21 years, 1 month and 27 days
Oldest	Alexander Shatilov	Israel	March 22, 1987	31 years, 4 months and 21 days

Position	Gymnast	D Score	E Score	Penalty	Total
1st place, gold medalist(s)	(United Kingdom) Dominick Cunningham	6.100	8.566		14.666
2nd place, silver medalist(s)	(Israel) Artem Dolgopyat	6.400	8.366	0.300	14.466
3rd place, bronze medalist(s)	(Russia) Artur Dalaloyan	6.200	8.266		14.466
4	(Russia) Nikita Nagornyy	6.400	8.333	0.300	14.433
5	(Israel) Alexander Shatilov	6.300	7.933		14.233
6	(Germany) Marcel Nguyen	6.100	7.966		14.066
7	(Spain) Rayderley Zapata	6.000	6.966		12.966
8	(Turkey) Ahmet Önder	6.000	6.600	0.100	12.500

=== Pommel horse ===
Oldest and youngest competitors

	Name	Country	Date of birth	Age
Youngest	Rhys McClenaghan	Ireland	July 21, 1999	19 years and 22 days
Oldest	Sašo Bertoncelj	Slovenia	July 16, 1984	34 years and 27 days

Position	Gymnast	D Score	E Score	Penalty	Total
1st place, gold medalist(s)	(Republic of Ireland) Rhys McClenaghan	6.500	8.800		15.300
2nd place, silver medalist(s)	(Croatia) Robert Seligman	6.100	8.766		14.866
2nd place, silver medalist(s)	(Slovenia) Sašo Bertoncelj	6.100	8.766		14.866
4	(Russia) David Belyavskiy	6.200	8.600		14.800
5	(Russia) Nikolai Kuksenkov	6.000	8.633		14.633
6	(Croatia) Filip Ude	5.500	8.500		14.000
7	(United Kingdom) Max Whitlock	6.300	7.700		14.000
8	(Ukraine) Petro Pakhnyuk	6.200	7.566		13.766

=== Rings ===
Oldest and youngest competitors

	Name	Country	Date of birth	Age
Youngest	Nikita Nagornyy	Russia	February 12, 1997	21 years and 6 months
Oldest	Marcel Nguyen	Germany	September 8, 1987	30 years, 11 months and 4 days

Position	Gymnast	D Score	E Score	Penalty	Total
1st place, gold medalist(s)	(Greece) Eleftherios Petrounias	6.300	9.166		15.466
2nd place, silver medalist(s)	(Turkey) İbrahim Çolak	6.200	8.900		15.100
3rd place, bronze medalist(s)	(United Kingdom) Courtney Tulloch	6.400	8.600		15.000
4	(Russia) Nikita Nagornyy	6.000	8.633		14.633
5	(Armenia) Vahagn Davtyan	6.100	8.466		14.566
6	(Germany) Marcel Nguyen	5.900	8.466	0.300	14.066
7	(Belgium) Dennis Goossens	6.200	7.500		13.700
8	(Romania) Andrei Muntean	5.600	6.566	0.800	11.366

=== Vault ===
Oldest and youngest competitors

	Name	Country	Date of birth	Age
Youngest	Dmitriy Lankin	Russia	April 17, 1997	21 years, 3 months and 26 days
Oldest	Andrey Medvedev	Israel	April 6, 1990	28 years, 4 months and 6 days

Position	Gymnast	D Score	E Score	Pen.	Score 1	D Score	E Score	Pen.	Score 2	Total
Position	Gymnast	Vault 1				Vault 2				Total
1st place, gold medalist(s)	(Russia) Artur Dalaloyan	5.600	9.400		15.000	5.600	9.200		14.800	14.900
2nd place, silver medalist(s)	(Ukraine) Igor Radivilov	5.600	9.133		14.733	5.600	9.400		15.000	14.866
3rd place, bronze medalist(s)	(Russia) Dmitriy Lankin	5.600	9.133		14.733	5.200	9.400		14.600	14.666
4	(France) Loris Frasca	5.600	9.200	0.100	14.700	5.600	9.000	0.100	14.500	14.600
5	(Israel) Andrey Medvedev	5.600	8.433	0.100	13.933	5.600	9.100	0.100	14.933	14.266
6	(Georgia (country)) Konstantin Kuzovkov	4.800	9.333		14.133	5.200	9.200	0.100	14.300	14.216
7	(Bulgaria) Dimitar Dimitrov	5.200	9.166		14.366	4.800	9.200		14.000	14.183
8	(Iceland) Valgarð Reinhardsson	5.200	8.800	0.100	13.900	5.200	7.833		13.033	13.466

=== Parallel bars ===
Oldest and youngest competitors

	Name	Country	Date of birth	Age
Youngest	Henji Mboyo	Switzerland	December 3, 1998	19 years, 8 months and 9 days
Oldest	Petro Pakhnyuk	Ukraine	November 26, 1991	26 years, 8 months and 17 days

Position	Gymnast	D Score	E Score	Penalty	Total
1st place, gold medalist(s)	(Russia) Artur Dalaloyan	6.400	9.033		15.433
2nd place, silver medalist(s)	(Russia) David Belyavskiy	6.400	8.766		15.166
3rd place, bronze medalist(s)	(Switzerland) Oliver Hegi	6.100	8.533		14.633
4	(Germany) Nils Dunkel	5.900	8.466		14.366
5	(Turkey) Ahmet Önder	6.200	7.466		13.666
6	(Ukraine) Petro Pakhnyuk	5.800	7.500		13.300
7	(Switzerland) Henji Mboyo	5.900	7.400		13.300
8	(United Kingdom) Joe Fraser	4.700	8.166		12.866

=== Horizontal bar ===
Oldest and youngest competitors

	Name	Country	Date of birth	Age
Youngest	Noah Kuavita	Belgium	July 28, 1999	19 years and 15 days
Oldest	Ümit Şamiloğlu	Turkey	September 29, 1980	37 years, 10 months and 14 days

Position	Gymnast	D Score	E Score	Penalty	Total
1st place, gold medalist(s)	(Switzerland) Oliver Hegi	6.200	8.500		14.700
2nd place, silver medalist(s)	(Netherlands) Epke Zonderland	6.700	7.700		14.400
3rd place, bronze medalist(s)	(Hungary) Dávid Vecsernyés	5.700	8.333		14.033
4	(Switzerland) Taha Serhani	6.000	8.033		14.033
5	(United Kingdom) James Hall	6.400	7.633		14.033
6	(United Kingdom) Joe Fraser	5.600	8.166		13.766
7	(Turkey) Ümit Şamiloğlu	5.900	7.833		13.733
8	(Belgium) Noah Kuavita	5.600	6.666		12.266

== Juniors' results ==
=== Team competition ===
Rank	Team	Floor (gymnastics)	Pommel horse	Rings (gymnastics)	Vault (gymnastics)	Parallel bars	Horizontal bar	Total
1st place, gold medalist(s)	Russia	39.565 (5)	39.932 (2)	41.632 (1)	41.633 (4)	39.399 (6)	38.800 (1)	240.961
1st place, gold medalist(s)	Yuriy Busse	13.066	13.366			12.800	13.100	240.961
1st place, gold medalist(s)	Viktor Kalyuzhin	12.966	13.100	13.766	13.633		12.500	240.961
1st place, gold medalist(s)	Mikhail Khudchenko	11.933	13.466	13.633	14.000	13.300	12.433	240.961
1st place, gold medalist(s)	Grigorii Klimentev			14.233	13.900	12.933		240.961
1st place, gold medalist(s)	Sergei Naidin	13.533	12.766	13.200	13.733	13.166	13.200	240.961
2nd place, silver medalist(s)	Great Britain	40.699 (1)	39.999 (1)	39.466 (3)	43.399 (1)	39.566 (5)	36.999 (6)	240.128
2nd place, silver medalist(s)	Jamie Lewis	13.733	13.833	13.533	14.466	12.500	11.666	240.128
2nd place, silver medalist(s)	Pavel Karnejenko	13.500	12.500	12.866	14.200	13.000	12.533	240.128
2nd place, silver medalist(s)	Adam Tobin	13.466	13.000	13.033		13.100	11.633	240.128
2nd place, silver medalist(s)	Donnell Osborne			12.900	14.333		12.800	240.128
2nd place, silver medalist(s)	Jake Jarman	13.466	13.166		14.600	13.466		240.128
3rd place, bronze medalist(s)	Italy	40.333 (2)	38.399 (7)	38.532 (8)	42.433 (2)	39.732 (4)	38.466 (2)	237.895
3rd place, bronze medalist(s)	Lay Giannini	13.200	12.133	12.633	14.033	13.666	9.700	237.895
3rd place, bronze medalist(s)	Yumin Abbadini	12.800	12.400	12.666	14.000	12.800	12.700	237.895
3rd place, bronze medalist(s)	Nicolò Mozzato	13.633	12.433	13.200	14.200	13.266	13.466	237.895
3rd place, bronze medalist(s)	Ares Federici	13.500			14.200			237.895
3rd place, bronze medalist(s)	Edoardo de Rosa		13.566	12.666		12.000	12.300	237.895
4	Switzerland	39.932 (3)	38.633 (5)	39.266 (4)	41.966 (3)	40.166 (2)	37.866 (4)	237.829
4	Tim Randegger	13.233	12.700	12.366	13.900	13.233	12.733	237.829
4	Marc Heidelberger	13.033			13.633			237.829
4	Dominic Tamsel	12.966	12.933	13.133		13.433	13.133	237.829
4	Ian Raubal		13.000	12.900	DNS	13.500	10.833	237.829
4	Andrin Frey	13.666	10.700	13.233	14.433	13.166	12.000	237.829
5	Ukraine	38.966 (6)	38.533 (6)	39.933 (2)	40.832 (8)	40.199 (1)	36.633 (8)	235.096
5	Dmytro Shyshko	12.500		13.200	11.600		12.200	235.096
5	Vladyslav Hrynevych	12.600	12.833	12.733	13.766	13.400	12.600	235.096
5	Roman Vashchenko	13.000	12.600	13.633	13.100	13.033		235.096
5	Illia Kovtun		12.033			13.766	11.833	235.096
5	Nazar Chepurnyi	13.366	13.100	13.100	13.966	13.000	10.966	235.096
6	Germany	38.333 (12)	37.399 (8)	38.799 (7)	40.765 (9)	40.166 (2)	38.233 (3)	233.695
6	Karim Rida	13.500	11.766	12.633	13.833	13.400	12.600	233.695
6	Lucas Kochan	13.000		11.866	13.366	13.400	11.300	233.695
6	Lewis Trebing		11.200					233.695
6	Glenn Trebing	11.833	12.533	13.100	13.566	13.166	12.700	233.695
6	Daniel Wörz	DNS	13.100	13.066	DNS	13.366	12.933	233.695
7	France	39.866 (4)	36.932 (9)	38.532 (8)	41.198 (5)	38.532 (7)	35.765 (14)	230.825
7	Benjamin Osberger	13.200	12.666		13.766	11.066	11.766	230.825
7	Dimitri Florent	13.066	12.066	12.400	13.866	12.433	11.366	230.825
7	Mathys Cordule	13.100		12.633		13.033	11.766	230.825
7	Bastien Eloy	13.566	7.333	13.033	13.533		12.233	230.825
7	Léo Saladino		12.200	12.866	13.566	13.066		230.825
8	Belgium	38.366 (11)	36.833 (10)	39.166 (5)	40.532 (11)	38.299 (8)	36.466 (9)	229.662
8	Mattis Bouchet	12.100			13.066	12.533	13.000	229.662
8	Justin Pesesse	13.466	12.200	13.000	14.000	11.900	12.066	229.662
8	Ward Claeys	12.066	12.433	12.433	DNS	12.900	11.400	229.662
8	Liam De Smet		8.966	13.433				229.662
8	Nicola Cuyle	12.800	12.200	12.733	13.466	12.866	10.666	229.662

=== Individual all-around ===
Position	Gymnast	Floor (gymnastics)	Pommel horse	Rings (gymnastics)	Vault (gymnastics)	Parallel bars	Horizontal bar	Total
1st place, gold medalist(s)	(Italy) Nicolò Mozzato	13.633	12.433	13.200	14.200	13.266	13.466	80.198
2nd place, silver medalist(s)	(United Kingdom) Jamie Lewis	13.733	13.833	13.533	14.466	12.500	11.666	79.731
3rd place, bronze medalist(s)	(Russia) Sergei Naidin	13.533	12.766	13.200	13.733	13.166	13.200	79.598
4	(Russia) Mikhail Khudchenko	11.933	13.466	13.633	14.000	13.300	12.433	78.765
5	(United Kingdom) Pavel Karnejenko	13.500	12.500	12.866	14.200	13.000	12.533	78.599
6	(Switzerland) Tim Randegger	13.233	12.700	12.366	13.900	13.233	12.733	78.165
7	(Ukraine) Vladyslav Hrynevych	12.600	12.833	12.733	13.766	13.400	12.600	77.932
8	(Germany) Karim Rida	13.500	11.766	12.633	13.833	13.400	12.600	77.732
9	(Ukraine) Nazar Chepurnyi	13.366	13.100	13.100	13.966	13.000	10.966	77.498
10	(Italy) Yumin Abbadini	12.800	12.400	12.666	14.000	12.800	12.700	77.366
11	(Switzerland) Andrin Frey	13.666	10.700	13.233	14.433	13.166	12.000	77.198
12	(Germany) Glenn Trebing	11.833	12.533	13.100	13.566	13.166	12.700	76.898
13	(Romania) Rafael Szabo	12.833	11.633	13.333	13.800	12.800	12.300	76.699
14	(Hungary) Krisztofer Mészáros	13.366	13.433	12.000	12.933	12.833	12.100	76.665
15	(Belgium) Justin Pesesse	13.466	12.200	13.000	14.000	11.900	12.066	76.632
16	(Hungary) Krisztián Balázs	12.900	12.366	11.666	13.133	13.300	13.100	76.465
17	(Belarus) Raman Antropau	12.966	12.766	12.600	13.133	12.833	12.066	76.364
18	(Czech Republic) Daniel Ponížil	12.900	11.700	12.333	14.100	13.066	12.133	76.232
19	(Sweden) David Rumbutis	13.366	12.066	12.833	12.966	12.633	12.300	76.164
20	(Azerbaijan) Samad Mammadli	13.033	13.233	11.833	12.133	13.066	12.400	75.698
–	(Italy) Lay Giannini	13.200	12.133	12.633	14.033	13.666	9.700	75.365
21	(Greece) Georgios Kelesidis	12.366	12.133	12.866	12.933	12.566	12.433	75.297
22	(France) Dimitri Florent	13.066	12.066	12.400	13.866	12.433	11.366	75.197
23	(Armenia) Zhora Smbatyan	12.333	12.433	13.100	13.300	11.666	12.333	75.165
24	(Latvia) Oļegs Ivanovs	12.866	11.333	12.666	13.500	13.033	11.433	74.831

=== Floor ===
Position	Gymnast	D Score	E Score	Penalty	Total
1st place, gold medalist(s)	(United Kingdom) Jamie Lewis	5.000	8.933	0.100	13.833
2nd place, silver medalist(s)	(Italy) Nicolò Mozzato	5.100	8.566		13.666
3rd place, bronze medalist(s)	(Russia) Sergei Naidin	5.000	8.700	0.200	13.500
4	(Italy) Ares Federici	5.000	8.500		13.500
5	(Switzerland) Andrin Frey	5.200	8.300		13.500
6	(United Kingdom) Pavel Karnejenko	4.500	8.366		12.866
7	(France) Bastien Eloy	4.800	8.033		12.833
8	(Germany) Karim Rida	5.000	7.133	0.100	12.033

=== Pommel horse ===
Position	Gymnast	D Score	E Score	Penalty	Total
1st place, gold medalist(s)	(Italy) Edoardo de Rosa	5.100	8.966		14.066
2nd place, silver medalist(s)	(United Kingdom) Jamie Lewis	5.700	8.033		13.733
3rd place, bronze medalist(s)	(Armenia) Gagik Khachikyan	4.900	8.700		13.600
4	(Russia) Mikhail Khudchenko	4.600	8.966		13.566
5	(Croatia) Mauro Nemčanin	4.900	8.666		13.566
6	(Croatia) Mateo Žugec	4.900	8.566		13.466
7	(Hungary) Krisztofer Mészáros	4.800	8.133		12.933
8	(Russia) Yuriy Busse	4.200	7.966		12.166

=== Rings ===
Position	Gymnast	D Score	E Score	Penalty	Total
1st place, gold medalist(s)	(Russia) Grigorii Klimentev	5.200	9.100		14.300
2nd place, silver medalist(s)	(Russia) Viktor Kalyuzhin	4.700	9.166		13.866
3rd place, bronze medalist(s)	(United Kingdom) Jamie Lewis	4.500	9.200		13.700
4	(Ukraine) Roman Vashchenko	5.000	8.633		13.633
5	(Romania) Rafael Szabo	4.900	8.533		13.433
6	(Belgium) Liam De Smet	4.900	8.200		13.100
7	(Azerbaijan) Javidan Babayev	4.800	7.333		12.133
8	(Switzerland) Andrin Frey	DNS			

=== Vault ===
Position	Gymnast	D Score	E Score	Pen.	Score 1	D Score	E Score	Pen.	Score 2	Total
Position	Gymnast	Vault 1				Vault 2				Total
1st place, gold medalist(s)	(Belarus) Sviataslau Dranitski	5.200	9.200		14.400	5.200	9.066		14.266	14.333
2nd place, silver medalist(s)	(United Kingdom) Jake Jarman	5.600	9.000		14.600	4.800	9.200		14.000	14.300
3rd place, bronze medalist(s)	(Italy) Ares Federici	5.200	9.300		14.500	4.800	9.300		14.100	14.300
4	(Czech Republic) Ondřej Kalný	5.200	9.133		14.333	4.800	9.266		14.066	14.199
5	(United Kingdom) Donnell Osborne	5.200	9.200		14.400	4.800	9.100		13.900	14.150
6	(Belgium) Justin Pesesse	4.800	9.300		14.100	5.200	8.933		14.133	14.116
7	(Czech Republic) Daniel Ponížil	4.800	9.233		14.033	4.000	9.300		13.300	13.666
8	(Switzerland) Andrin Frey	5.200	8.200		13.400	DNF				

=== Parallel bars ===
Position	Gymnast	D Score	E Score	Penalty	Total
1st place, gold medalist(s)	(Ukraine) Illia Kovtun	5.000	9.000		14.000
2nd place, silver medalist(s)	(Germany) Karim Rida	4.300	9.233		13.533
3rd place, bronze medalist(s)	(Switzerland) Dominic Tamsel	4.600	8.933		13.533
4	(Italy) Lay Giannini	4.300	9.200		13.500
5	(Ukraine) Vladyslav Hrynevych	5.100	8.333		13.433
6	(Germany) Lucas Kochan	4.100	9.300		13.400
7	(Switzerland) Ian Raubal	4.800	8.400		13.200
8	(United Kingdom) Jake Jarman	4.700	8.066		12.766

=== Horizontal bar ===
Position	Gymnast	D Score	E Score	Penalty	Total
1st place, gold medalist(s)	(Italy) Nicolò Mozzato	4.800	8.833		13.633
2nd place, silver medalist(s)	(Hungary) Krisztián Balázs	4.400	8.900		13.300
3rd place, bronze medalist(s)	(Germany) Daniel Wörz	4.700	8.366		13.066
4	(Russia) Yuriy Busse	4.400	8.566		12.966
5	(Belgium) Mattis Bouchet	4.300	8.633		12.933
6	(Switzerland) Dominic Tamsel	4.400	8.400		12.800
7	(United Kingdom) Donnell Osborne	3.500	8.333		11.833
8	(Russia) Sergei Naidin	4.400	6.766		11.166

== Qualification results ==
=== Senior's results ===
==== Team competition ====
Rank	Team	Floor (gymnastics)	Pommel horse	Rings (gymnastics)	Vault (gymnastics)	Parallel bars	Horizontal bar	Total	Qual.
1	Russia	43.432 (1)	44.200 (1)	43.832 (1)	42.966 (1)	46.265 (1)	38.732 (9)	259.427	Q
1	David Belyavskiy		15.000		14.100	15.533	12.866	259.427	Q
1	Artur Dalaloyan	14.600		14.533	14.716	15.466		259.427	Q
1	Nikolai Kuksenkov		14.700				12.200	259.427	Q
1	Dimitrii Lankin	14.366		14.633	14.383			259.427	Q
1	Nikita Nagornyy	14.466	14.500	14.666		15.266	13.666	259.427	Q
2	Great Britain	41.266 (4)	43.466 (2)	42.466 (4)	41.366 (14)	43.166 (3)	40.766 (3)	252.496	Q
2	Dominick Cunningham	14.366			14.050	14.200	13.233	252.496	Q
2	Joe Fraser		14.400	13.633		14.800	13.800	252.496	Q
2	James Hall	13.300	14.166	13.733	14.366	14.166	13.733	252.496	Q
2	Courtney Tulloch			15.100	13.666			252.496	Q
2	Max Whitlock	13.600	14.900					252.496	Q
3	Germany	41.166 (5)	40.399 (5)	42.599 (3)	42.800 (2)	42.365 (4)	36.765 (16)	246.094	Q
3	Andreas Bretschneider	13.500	12.733		14.300	14.066	13.066	246.094	Q
3	Nils Dunkel		14.000			14.466		246.094	Q
3	Nick Klessing	13.233		13.733	14.300			246.094	Q
3	Marcel Nguyen	14.433		14.666	14.200	13.833	12.466	246.094	Q
3	Andreas Toba		13.666	14.200			11.233	246.094	Q
4	Switzerland	39.898 (9)	40.232 (6)	39.599 (13)	41.332 (15)	43.898 (2)	40.133 (4)	245.092	Q
4	Benjamin Gischard		14.033	13.566				245.092	Q
4	Oliver Hegi		13.466			14.866	14.100	245.092	Q
4	Henji Mboyo	12.966	12.733	12.633	13.166	14.666	12.300	245.092	Q
4	Noe Samuel Seifert	13.566		13.400	13.833			245.092	Q
4	Taha Serhani	13.366			14.333	14.366	13.733	245.092	Q
5	Turkey	38.666 (17)	36.699 (22)	42.766 (2)	42.265 (3)	41.998 (6)	40.865 (1)	243.259	Q
5	Ferhat Arıcan	12.200	13.266		14.266	14.466	13.366	243.259	Q
5	İbrahim Çolak			15.033		12.866		243.259	Q
5	Emre Gündoğdu	12.333		13.933				243.259	Q
5	Ahmet Önder	14.133	12.633	13.800	14.366	14.666	13.566	243.259	Q
5	Ümit Şamiloğlu		10.800		13.633		13.933	243.259	Q
6	France	40.166 (8)	40.065 (7)	40.100 (12)	41.733 (10)	42.066 (5)	38.866 (8)	242.996	Q
6	Axel Augis		13.966	13.200	13.133	14.233	13.300	242.996	Q
6	Edgar Boulet	12.433					12.733	242.996	Q
6	Loris Frasca	14.033		13.400	14.100	13.900		242.996	Q
6	Julien Gobaux	13.700	11.766	13.500	14.000	13.933	12.833	242.996	Q
6	Cyril Tommasone		14.333					242.996	Q
7	Spain	42.099 (2)	39.098 (13)	41.366 (7)	42.133 (4)	40.899 (8)	37.166 (15)	242.761	Q
7	Néstor Abad	13.733	13.666	13.766	13.900	14.100	13.300	242.761	Q
7	Thierno Boubacar Diallo		12.966			12.466	12.366	242.761	Q
7	Nicolau Mir	13.833		13.600	14.433	14.333	11.500	242.761	Q
7	Alberto Tallón		12.466	14.000				242.761	Q
7	Rayderley Zapata	14.533			13.800			242.761	Q
8	Italy	40.599 (6)	40.032 (9)	41.966 (6)	40.766 (18)	40.266 (9)	37.499 (14)	241.128	Q
8	Ludovico Edalli	13.666	13.566		13.400	12.866	12.700	241.128	Q
8	Tommaso De Vecchis	13.533	13.566				11.666	241.128	Q
8	Marco Lodadio	13.400		14.366	13.666			241.128	Q
8	Andrea Russo		12.900	14.200		13.400	13.133	241.128	Q
8	Marco Sarrugerio			13.400	13.700	14.000		241.128	Q
9	Netherlands	39.033 (14)	39.498 (12)	38.632 (18)	42.099 (5)	39.332 (14)	40.799 (2)	239.393	R1
9	Bart Deurloo	12.133	13.766	12.933	14.433		13.500	239.393	R1
9	Frank Rijken		13.066	12.233	13.600	14.366	12.966	239.393	R1
9	Casimir Schmidt	13.800	12.666	13.466		11.633		239.393	R1
9	Bram Verhofstad	13.100			14.066			239.393	R1
9	Epke Zonderland					13.333	14.333	239.393	R1
10	Israel	41.765 (3)	39.732 (11)	36.365 (24)	42.099 (5)	39.566 (13)	39.165 (6)	238.692	R2
10	Artem Dolgopyat	14.666	13.400			13.166		238.692	R2
10	Andrey Medvedev			12.966	14.849			238.692	R2
10	Alexander Myakinin						13.133	238.692	R2
10	Alexander Shatilov	14.266	13.166	13.233	13.900	13.700	13.066	238.692	R2
10	Michael Sorokine	12.833	13.166	10.166	13.433	12.700	12.966	238.692	R2

==== Floor ====
Rank	Gymnast	D Score	E Score	Pen.	Total	Qual.
1	(Israel) Artem Dolgopyat	6.400	8.266		14.666	Q
2	(Russia) Artur Dalaloyan	6.200	8.500	0.100	14.600	Q
3	(Spain) Rayderley Zapata	6.100	8.433		14.533	Q
4	(Russia) Nikita Nagornyy	6.400	8.066		14.466	Q
5	(Germany) Marcel Nguyen	6.100	8.533		14.433	Q
6	(United Kingdom) Dominick Cunningham	6.100	8.266		14.366	Q
7	(Russia) Dmitriy Lankin	6.400	7.966		14.366	-
8	(Israel) Alexander Shatilov	6.200	8.066		14.266	Q
9	(Turkey) Ahmet Önder	6.000	8.133		14.133	Q
10	(Belgium) Jonathan Vrolix	5.900	8.200		14.100	R1
11	(Finland) Oskar Kirmes	5.600	8.466		14.066	R2
12	(France) Loris Frasca	5.900	8.133		14.033	R3

==== Pommel horse ====
Rank	Gymnast	D Score	E Score	Pen.	Total	Qual.
1	(Republic of Ireland) Rhys McClenaghan	6.500	8.766		15.266	Q
2	(Russia) David Belyavskiy	6.200	8.800		15.000	Q
3	(United Kingdom) Max Whitlock	6.700	8.200		14.900	Q
4	(Croatia) Filip Ude	6.100	8.666		14.766	Q
5	(Croatia) Robert Seligman	6.100	8.666		14.766	Q
6	(Russia) Nikolai Kuksenkov	6.000	8.700		14.700	Q
7	(Slovenia) Sašo Bertoncelj	6.100	8.533		14.633	Q
8	(Ukraine) Petro Pakhnyuk	6.200	8.433		14.633	Q
9	(Armenia) Artur Davtyan	5.900	8.600		14.500	R1
10	(Russia) Nikita Nagornyy	5.900	8.600		14.500	-
11	(United Kingdom) Joe Fraser	6.100	8.300		14.400	R2
12	(France) Cyril Tommasone	6.200	8.133		14.333	R3

==== Rings ====
Rank	Gymnast	D Score	E Score	Pen.	Total	Qual.
1	(Greece) Eleftherios Petrounias	6.300	8.833		15.133	Q
2	(United Kingdom) Courtney Tulloch	6.400	8.700		15.100	Q
3	(Turkey) İbrahim Çolak	6.200	8.833		15.033	Q
4	(Armenia) Vahagn Davtyan	6.100	8.733		14.833	Q
5	(Belgium) Dennis Goossens	6.200	8.566		14.766	Q
6	(Romania) Andrei Muntean	6.100	8.633		14.733	Q
7	(Germany) Marcel Nguyen	5.900	8.766		14.666	Q
7	(Russia) Nikita Nagornyy	5.900	8.766		14.666	Q
9	(Russia) Dmitriy Lankin	6.000	8.633		14.633	R1
10	(Ukraine) Igor Radivilov	6.300	8.266		14.566	R2
11	(Russia) Artur Dalaloyan	5.900	8.633		14.533	-
12	(Azerbaijan) Nikita Simonov	6.000	8.800	0.3	14.500	R3

==== Vault ====
Position	Gymnast	D Score	E Score	Pen.	Score 1	D Score	E Score	Pen.	Score 2	Total	Qual.
Position	Gymnast	Vault 1				Vault 2				Total	Qual.
1	(Israel) Andrey Medvedev	5.600	9.166		14.766	5.600	9.333		14.933	14.849	Q
2	(Ukraine) Igor Radivilov	5.600	9.200		14.800	5.600	9.166		14.766	14.783	Q
3	(Russia) Artur Dalaloyan	5.600	9.066		14.666	5.600	9.166		14.766	14.716	Q
4	(Russia) Dmitriy Lankin	5.200	9.100	0.1	14.200	5.600	8.966		14.566	14.383	Q
5	(Iceland) Valgarð Reinhardsson	5.200	9.033		14.233	5.200	9.033		14.233	14.233	Q
6	(Bulgaria) Dimitar Dimitrov	5.200	9.133		14.333	4.800	9.266		14.066	14.199	Q
7	(Georgia (country)) Konstantin Kuzovkov	4.800	9.133		13.933	5.200	9.166		14.366	14.149	Q
8	(France) Loris Frasca	5.600	9.100	0.1	14.600	5.600	8.000		13.600	14.100	Q
9	(United Kingdom) Dominick Cunningham	5.400	8.000	0.1	13.300	5.600	9.200		14.800	14.050	R1
10	(Belarus) Pavel Bulauski	5.200	8.700	0.1	13.800	5.200	8.800	0.1	13.900	13.850	R2
11	(Romania) Adelin Kotrong	5.200	8.833		14.033	5.200	8.466		13.666	13.849	R3

==== Parallel bars ====
Rank	Gymnast	D Score	E Score	Pen.	Total	Qual.
1	(Russia) David Belyavskiy	6.400	9.133		15.533	Q
2	(Russia) Artur Dalaloyan	6.400	9.066		15.466	Q
3	(Russia) Nikita Nagornyy	6.400	8.866		15.266	-
4	(Switzerland) Oliver Hegi	6.100	8.766		14.866	Q
5	(United Kingdom) Joe Fraser	6.400	8.400		14.800	Q
6	(Ukraine) Petro Pakhnyuk	6.500	8.200		14.700	Q
7	(Switzerland) Henji Mboyo	5.900	8.766		14.666	Q
8	(Turkey) Ahmet Önder	6.200	8.466		14.666	Q
9	(Germany) Nils Dunkel	5.900	8.566		14.466	Q
10	(Turkey) Ferhat Arican	6.300	8.166		14.466	R1
11	(Netherlands) Frank Rijken	5.500	8.866		14.366	R2
12	(Switzerland) Taha Serhani	5.600	8.766		14.366	-
13	(Spain) Nicolau Mir	5.500	8.833		14.333	R3

==== High bar ====
Rank	Gymnast	D Score	E Score	Pen.	Total	Qual.
1	(Netherlands) Epke Zonderland	6.200	8.133		14.333	Q
2	(Hungary) Dávid Vecsernyés	5.700	8.500		14.200	Q
3	(Switzerland) Oliver Hegi	6.200	7.900		14.100	Q
4	(Belgium) Noah Kuavita	6.100	7.933		14.033	Q
5	(Turkey) Ümit Şamiloğlu	5.900	8.033		13.933	Q
6	(United Kingdom) Joe Fraser	5.600	8.200		13.800	Q
7	(United Kingdom) James Hall	6.000	7.733		13.733	Q
8	(Switzerland) Taha Serhani	6.200	7.533		13.733	Q
9	(Russia) Nikita Nagornyy	5.800	7.866		13.666	R1
10	(Turkey) Ahmet Önder	5.800	7.766		13.566	R2
11	(Netherlands) Bart Deurloo	6.100	7.400		13.500	R3

=== Junior's results ===
==== Floor ====
Rank	Gymnast	D Score	E Score	Pen.	Total	Qual.
1	(United Kingdom) Jamie Lewis	5.000	8.733		13.733	Q
2	(Switzerland) Andrin Frey	5.200	8.466		13.666	Q
3	(Italy) Nicolò Mozzato	5.100	8.533		13.633	Q
4	(France) Bastien Eloy	5.000	8.566		13.566	Q
5	(Russia) Sergei Naidin	5.000	8.533		13.533	Q
6	(United Kingdom) Pavel Karnejenko	4.900	8.600		13.500	Q
7	(Germany) Karim Rida	5.000	8.500		13.500	Q
7	(Italy) Ares Federici	5.000	8.500		13.500	Q
9	(Belgium) Justin Pesesse	4.800	8.666		13.466	R1
9	(Czech Republic) Ondřej Kalný	4.800	8.666		13.466	R2
11	(United Kingdom) Adam Tobin	4.900	8.566		13.466	–
12	(United Kingdom) Jake Jarman	5.200	8.266		13.466	–
13	(Ukraine) Nazar Chepurnyi	4.800	8.666	0.100	13.366	R3

==== Pommel horse ====
Rank	Gymnast	D Score	E Score	Pen.	Total	Qual.
1	(United Kingdom) Jamie Lewis	5.700	8.133		13.833	Q
2	(Italy) Edoardo de Rosa	5.000	8.566		13.566	Q
3	(Russia) Mikhail Khudchenko	4.600	8.866		13.466	Q
4	(Hungary) Krisztofer Mészáros	4.900	8.533		13.433	Q
5	(Russia) Yuriy Busse	5.000	8.366		13.366	Q
6	(Armenia) Gagik Khachikyan	4.600	8.733		13.333	Q
7	(Croatia) Mauro Nemčanin	4.900	8.433		13.333	Q
8	(Croatia) Marko Sambolec	4.900	8.366		13.266	Q
9	(Azerbaijan) Samad Mammadli	4.900	8.333		13.233	R1
10	(United Kingdom) Jake Jarman	4.800	8.366		13.166	R2
11	(Croatia) Mateo Žugec	4.600	8.533		13.133	–
12	(Germany) Daniel Wörz	4.700	8.400		13.100	R3

==== Rings ====
Rank	Gymnast	D Score	E Score	Pen.	Total	Qual.
1	(Russia) Grigorii Klimentev	5.200	9.033		14.233	Q
2	(Russia) Viktor Kalyuzhin	4.700	9.066		13.766	Q
3	(Russia) Mikhail Khudchenko	4.500	9.133		13.633	–
4	(Ukraine) Roman Vashchenko	5.000	8.633		13.633	Q
5	(United Kingdom) Jamie Lewis	4.500	9.033		13.533	Q
6	(Belgium) Liam De Smet	4.900	8.533		13.433	Q
7	(Romania) Rafael Szabo	4.900	8.433		13.333	Q
8	(Azerbaijan) Javidan Babayev	4.800	8.500		13.300	Q
9	(Switzerland) Andrin Frey	4.400	8.833		13.233	Q
10	(Italy) Nicolò Mozzato	4.300	8.900		13.200	R1
10	(Russia) Sergei Naidin	4.300	8.900		13.200	–
12	(Ukraine) Dmytro Shyshko	4.400	8.800		13.200	R2
13	(Switzerland) Dominic Tamsel	4.300	8.833		13.133	R3

==== Vault ====
Position	Gymnast	D Score	E Score	Pen.	Score 1	D Score	E Score	Pen.	Score 2	Total	Qual.
Position	Gymnast	Vault 1				Vault 2				Total	Qual.
1	(Belarus) Sviataslau Dranitski	5.200	9.166		14.366	5.200	9.000		14.200	14.283	Q
2	(United Kingdom) Jake Jarman	5.600	9.100	0.100	14.600	4.800	9.066		13.866	14.233	Q
3	(Switzerland) Andrin Frey	5.200	9.233		14.433	4.800	9.233		14.033	14.233	Q
4	(Italy) Ares Federici	5.200	9.000		14.200	4.800	9.200		14.000	14.100	Q
5	(Czech Republic) Ondřej Kalný	5.200	9.000		14.200	4.800	9.200	0.100	13.900	14.050	Q
6	(United Kingdom) Donnell Osborne	5.200	9.133		14.333	4.800	8.800		13.600	13.966	Q
7	(Belgium) Justin Pesesse	4.800	9.200		14.000	5.200	8.733		13.933	13.966	Q
8	(United Kingdom) Pavel Karnejenko	5.200	9.000		14.200	4.800	8.800		13.600	13.900	–
9	(Czech Republic) Daniel Ponížil	4.800	9.300		14.100	4.000	9.200		13.200	13.650	Q
10	(Russia) Mikhail Khudchenko	4.800	9.200		14.000	4.000	9.200		13.200	13.600	R1
11	(Russia) Viktor Kalyuzhin	4.800	8.833		13.633	4.000	9.366		13.366	13.499	R2
12	(Sweden) David Rumbutis	5.200	7.866	0.100	12.966	4.800	9.133		13.933	13.449	R3

==== Parallel bars ====
Rank	Gymnast	D Score	E Score	Pen.	Total	Qual.
1	(Ukraine) Illia Kovtun	5.000	8.766		13.766	Q
2	(Italy) Lay Giannini	4.300	9.366		13.666	Q
3	(Switzerland) Ian Raubal	4.800	8.700		13.500	Q
4	(United Kingdom) Jake Jarman	4.700	8.766		13.466	Q
5	(Switzerland) Dominic Tamsel	4.600	8.833		13.433	Q
6	(Germany) Lucas Kochan	3.900	9.500		13.400	Q
7	(Germany) Karim Rida	4.300	9.100		13.400	Q
8	(Ukraine) Vladyslav Hrynevych	5.100	8.300		13.400	Q
9	(Turkey) Kerem Şener	4.300	9.066		13.366	R1
10	(Germany) Daniel Wörz	4.800	8.566		13.366	–
11	(Russia) Mikhail Khudchenko	4.500	8.800		13.300	R2
12	(Hungary) Krisztián Balázs	4.800	8.500		13.300	R3

==== High bar ====
Rank	Gymnast	D Score	E Score	Pen.	Total	Qual.
1	(Italy) Nicolò Mozzato	4.800	8.666		13.466	Q
2	(Russia) Sergei Naidin	4.700	8.500		13.200	Q
3	(Switzerland) Dominic Tamsel	4.400	8.733		13.133	Q
4	(Hungary) Krisztián Balázs	4.400	8.700		13.100	Q
4	(Russia) Yuriy Busse	4.400	8.700		13.100	Q
6	(Belgium) Mattis Bouchet	4.300	8.700		13.000	Q
7	(Germany) Daniel Wörz	4.500	8.433		12.933	Q
8	(United Kingdom) Donnell Osborne	4.200	8.600		12.800	Q
9	(Switzerland) Tim Randegger	4.400	8.333		12.733	R1
10	(Italy) Yumin Abbadini	4.200	8.500		12.700	R2
11	(Germany) Glenn Trebing	4.500	8.200		12.700	R3

== See also ==
- 2018 European Women's Artistic Gymnastics Championships
