= Dmitriy Lankin =

Russian artistic gymnast

Dmitrii Lankin
- Full name: Dmitriy Sergeevich Lankin
- Alternative name: Dmitri Lankin
- Nickname: Dima
- Born: 17 April 1997 (age 29) Rostov-on-Don, Rostov Oblast, Russia
- Spouse: Anastasia Dmitrieva (m. 2021)

Gymnastics career
- Discipline: Men's artistic gymnastics
- Country represented: Russia (2014–present)
- Club: Dynamo Moscow
- Gym: Round Lake
- Head coach: Anatoli Zabelin
Medal record
Representing Russia
Men's artistic gymnastics
World Championships
Silver medal – second place	2018 Doha	Team
European Games
Silver medal – second place	2019 Minsk	Vault
European Championships
Gold medal – first place	2018 Glasgow	Team
Silver medal – second place	2017 Cluj-Napoca	Floor Exercise
Bronze medal – third place	2018 Glasgow	Vault
Bronze medal – third place	2019 Szczecin	Floor Exercise

Dmitrii Sergeevich Lankin (Дмитрий Сергеевич Ланкин; born 17 April 1997) is a Russian artistic gymnast. He is the 2017 European floor silver medalist.

== Competitive History ==
Year	Event	Team	AA	FX	PH	SR	VT	PB	HB
2014	Voronin Junior Cup					1st place, gold medalist(s)		7	
2015	National Championships	4							
2015	Russian Cup	2nd place, silver medalist(s)	9	5			4	4	
2015	Voronin Cup	11							
2016	National Championships	3rd place, bronze medalist(s)							
2016	Varna World Cup							3rd place, bronze medalist(s)	
2016	Toyota International			4		4	4	10	
2017	National Championships	1st place, gold medalist(s)			1st place, gold medalist(s)	1st place, gold medalist(s)			
2017	European Championships			2nd place, silver medalist(s)		8			
2017	Voronin Cup			2nd place, silver medalist(s)			3rd place, bronze medalist(s)		
2018	National Championships	1st place, gold medalist(s)	30	3rd place, bronze medalist(s)		4	2nd place, silver medalist(s)	3rd place, bronze medalist(s)	
2018	Doha World Cup			1st place, gold medalist(s)		9	16		
2018	Russian Cup	1st place, gold medalist(s)		4		3rd place, bronze medalist(s)	2nd place, silver medalist(s)	2nd place, silver medalist(s)	
2018	World Championships	2nd place, silver medalist(s)		35		13	12	17	
2018	Cottbus World Cup			17			10	2nd place, silver medalist(s)	
2018	Voronin Cup		3rd place, bronze medalist(s)	7		3rd place, bronze medalist(s)		8	
2019	National Championships		4	1st place, gold medalist(s)		8	5	2nd place, silver medalist(s)	5
2019	DTB Team Challenge	1st place, gold medalist(s)	28	1st place, gold medalist(s)			1st place, gold medalist(s)	3rd place, bronze medalist(s)	
2019	European Championships			3rd place, bronze medalist(s)		11	5	33	
2019	European Games			4		8	2nd place, silver medalist(s)		
2019	Russian Cup			4		6	3rd place, bronze medalist(s)		
2021	National Championships	3rd place, bronze medalist(s)				8	3rd place, bronze medalist(s)		

== Career ==
Lankin has competed at the Russian National Championships since 2014 and won team bronze in 2016 and team gold in 2017. He competed internationally at the 2016 World Cup in Varna, Bulgaria where he won a bronze medal in parallel bars.

In 2017, Lankin competed at the 2017 European Championships and won a silver medal in floor behind Romania's Marian Drăgulescu. Notably, he is the one of a handful of active gymnasts who competes the H-difficulty Liukin or triple back tucked somersault, along with teammate Nikita Nagornyy.
