= Viktor Kalyuzhin =

Russian artistic gymnast

Viktor Kalyuzhin Виктор Калюжин
- Full name: Viktor Eduardovich Kalyuzhin
- Nickname: Vitya
- Born: 9 May 2001 (age 25)

Gymnastics career
- Discipline: Men's artistic gymnastics
- Country represented: Russia
- Head coaches: Bubnovsky V.N., Talia M.S.
Medal record
Men's artistic gymnastics
Representing Russia
FIG World Cup
Event	1st	2nd	3rd
World Challenge Cup	0	1	1
Total	0	1	1

Viktor Eduardovich Kalyuzhin (Russian: Виктор Эдуардович Калюжин; born 9 May 2001) is a Russian artistic gymnast. He is the silver medalist of the 2018 European Junior Championships on still rings.

== Career ==
In 2018 he became the silver medalist at the European Junior Championships on still rings and won the Team title along with teammates Yuri Busse, Grigorii Klimentev, Mikhail Khudchenko and Sergei Naidin.

Kalyuzhin made his senior international debut at the Mersin World Cup where he won silver on parallel bars and bronze on still rings.

== Competitive history ==
Year	Event	Team	AA	FX	PH	SR	VT	PB	HB
Junior
2015	Youth Spartakiad	20	22		4				
2015	Russian Junior Championships		20						
2015	Hopes of Russia		26						
2016	Northwestern Federal Championships	1st place, gold medalist(s)	1st place, gold medalist(s)	1st place, gold medalist(s)	1st place, gold medalist(s)	1st place, gold medalist(s)	1st place, gold medalist(s)	1st place, gold medalist(s)	1st place, gold medalist(s)
2016	Hopes of Russia					6			
2017	Youth Spartakiad		7		3rd place, bronze medalist(s)	3rd place, bronze medalist(s)	3rd place, bronze medalist(s)		8
2017	Voronin Cup Junior		7			1st place, gold medalist(s)	2nd place, silver medalist(s)		
2018	Russian Junior Championships		3rd place, bronze medalist(s)	7		1st place, gold medalist(s)	1st place, gold medalist(s)	6	
2018	European Junior Championships	1st place, gold medalist(s)	72	32	12	2nd place, silver medalist(s)	11		16
2018	Summer Youth Spartakiad		2nd place, silver medalist(s)	4	3rd place, bronze medalist(s)	2nd place, silver medalist(s)	4	8	
Senior
2019	National Championships		12	8					
2019	Russian Cup		12			8			
2020	Northwestern Federal Championships		1st place, gold medalist(s)	1st place, gold medalist(s)	1st place, gold medalist(s)	4		1st place, gold medalist(s)	1st place, gold medalist(s)
2021	Northwestern Federal Championship	1st place, gold medalist(s)	1st place, gold medalist(s)	1st place, gold medalist(s)	1st place, gold medalist(s)	1st place, gold medalist(s)		1st place, gold medalist(s)	1st place, gold medalist(s)
2021	National Championships	1st place, gold medalist(s)	6	5		6		4	
2021	Russian Cup		5	4		4		4	
2021	World Cup Mersin			8		3rd place, bronze medalist(s)		2nd place, silver medalist(s)	
2022
2022	Northwestern Federal Championship	1st place, gold medalist(s)	1st place, gold medalist(s)						
2022	National Championships	1st place, gold medalist(s)	3rd place, bronze medalist(s)	4		2nd place, silver medalist(s)		2nd place, silver medalist(s)	
