= David Belyavskiy =

Russian artistic gymnast

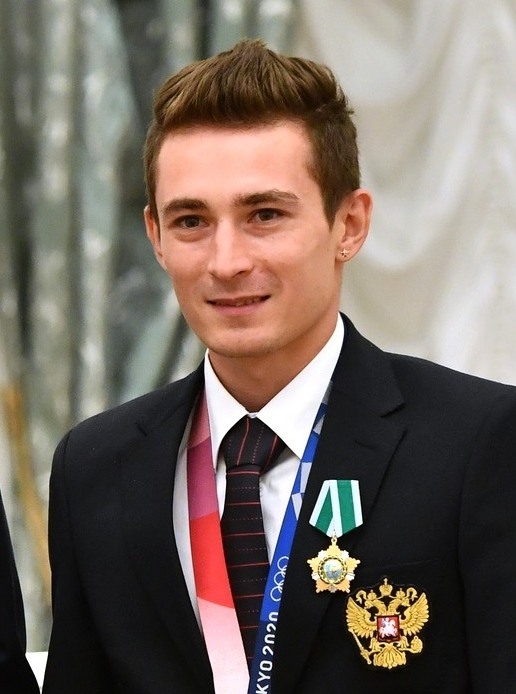
- Belyavskiy at the Kremlin in 2021

Personal information
- Full name: David Sagitovich Belyavskiy
- Born: 23 February 1992 (age 34) Votkinsk, Republic of Udmurtia, Russia
- Height: 1.63 m (5 ft 4 in)

Gymnastics career
- Discipline: Men's artistic gymnastics
- Country represented: Russia; (2008–present)
- Club: Lokomotiv Ekaterinburg
- Assistant coach: Valery Alfosov
- Eponymous skills: Parallel bars: piked double front dismount
Medal record
Men's artistic gymnastics
Representing Russia & ROC
Event	1st	2nd	3rd
Olympic Games	1	1	1
World Championships	1	2	1
European Championships	7	8	3
European Games	3	1	1
Summer Universiade	1	1	2
Total	13	13	8
Representing (Russia) ROC
Olympic Games
Gold medal – first place	2020 Tokyo	Team
Representing Russia
Olympic Games
Silver medal – second place	2016 Rio de Janeiro	Team
Bronze medal – third place	2016 Rio de Janeiro	Parallel Bars
World Championships
Gold medal – first place	2019 Stuttgart	Team
Silver medal – second place	2017 Montreal	Pommel Horse
Silver medal – second place	2018 Doha	Team
Bronze medal – third place	2017 Montreal	Parallel Bars
European Games
Gold medal – first place	2015 Baku	Team
Gold medal – first place	2019 Minsk	All-Around
Gold medal – first place	2019 Minsk	Pommel Horse
Silver medal – second place	2015 Baku	Parallel Bars
Bronze medal – third place	2015 Baku	Floor Exercise
European Championships
Gold medal – first place	2013 Moscow	All-Around
Gold medal – first place	2014 Sofia	Team
Gold medal – first place	2016 Bern	Team
Gold medal – first place	2016 Bern	Parallel Bars
Gold medal – first place	2017 Cluj-Napoca	Pommel Horse
Gold medal – first place	2018 Glasgow	Team
Gold medal – first place	2021 Basel	Horizontal Bar
Silver medal – second place	2012 Montpellier	Team
Silver medal – second place	2014 Sofia	Parallel Bars
Silver medal – second place	2015 Montpellier	All-Around
Silver medal – second place	2015 Montpellier	Floor Exercise
Silver medal – second place	2016 Bern	Pommel Horse
Silver medal – second place	2018 Glasgow	Parallel bars
Silver medal – second place	2021 Basel	All-Around
Silver medal – second place	2021 Basel	Parallel Bars
Bronze medal – third place	2013 Moscow	Parallel Bars
Bronze medal – third place	2016 Bern	Horizontal Bar
Bronze medal – third place	2017 Cluj-Napoca	Horizontal Bar
Summer Universiade
Gold medal – first place	2013 Kazan	Team
Silver medal – second place	2013 Kazan	Parallel Bars
Bronze medal – third place	2013 Kazan	All-Around
Bronze medal – third place	2013 Kazan	Floor Exercise

David Sagitovich Belyavskiy (Russian: Давид Сагитович Белявский, IPA: [dɐˈvʲid bʲɪˈlʲafskʲɪɪ̯]; born 23 February 1992) is a Russian artistic gymnast and three-time Olympian, representing Russia in 2012 and 2016 and ROC in 2020. He was part of the teams who won gold at the 2020 Olympic Games and 2019 World Championships and silver at the 2016 Olympic Games and 2018 World Championships. Individually Belyavskiy won an Olympic bronze medal on parallel bars in 2016 and a World silver and bronze medal on pommel horse and parallel bars, respectively, in 2017. Additionally he is the 2019 European Games champion, a five-time European Games medalist, seven-time European champion, and 18-time European medalist.

== Personal life ==
Belyavskiy was born in Votkinsk, Udmurtia. His parents died early in his life and he was raised by his grandparents, growing up in a boarding school. He attended Ural State University. He married his fiancée, Maria, on October 30, 2016, in Santorini, Greece. In September 2017, their daughter, Alyssia Belyavskaya, was born.

During an interview for the Match TV in September 2022, which coincided with the 2022 Russian mobilization, Belyavskiy said that there was no choice and he would go and serve in the Russian army if he received call-up papers.

== Career ==
=== 2010–2012 ===
Belyavskiy competed at the 2010 World Artistic Gymnastics Championships where he helped Russia finish sixth as a team. At the 2011 World Championships he helped Russia place fourth and individually he placed sixth in the all-around.

Belyavskiy was part of the Russian team that competed at the 2012 European Championships where they won the silver medal behind Great Britain. Belyavskiy later competed at the 2012 Summer Olympics, finishing fifth in the all-around and seventh on pommel horse. He ended the year winning bronze at the Stuttgart World Cup.

=== 2013 ===
Belyavskiy began his 2013 season by winning the Russian National all-around title and defending his parallel bars title. In April, he became the 2013 European individual all-around champion with an overall score of 89.799 points edging out British gymnast Max Whitlock for the gold. He won bronze on parallel bars and placed fifth on floor exercise.

Belyavskiy, alongside the Russian team (Nikolai Kuksenkov, Emin Garibov, Denis Ablyazin, and Nikita Ignatyev) won team gold at the 2013 Universiade in Kazan. He won the all-around bronze medal, tied with Ukrainian gymnast Oleg Verniaiev. During event finals he won bronze on floor exercise and silver on parallel bars behind compatriot Garibov.

Roughly a week before the 2013 World Championships Belyavskiy sustained an ankle injury. Despite this he still qualified to the all around final, where he ultimately finished twelfth.

=== 2014 ===
At the 2014 European Championships Belyavskiy helped Russia win the team gold medal with a total score of 267.959, over 2 points ahead of defending champions Great Britain. During event finals he won silver on parallel bars behind Ukrainian Oleg Verniaiev and placed eighth on floor exercise.

At the 2014 World Championships Belyavskiy qualified second into the all-around final, as well as qualifying to the horizontal bar final. During the team final Belyavskiy helped the Russian team to a fifth-place finish. Individually he placed fifth in the all around and on horizontal bar.

=== 2015 ===
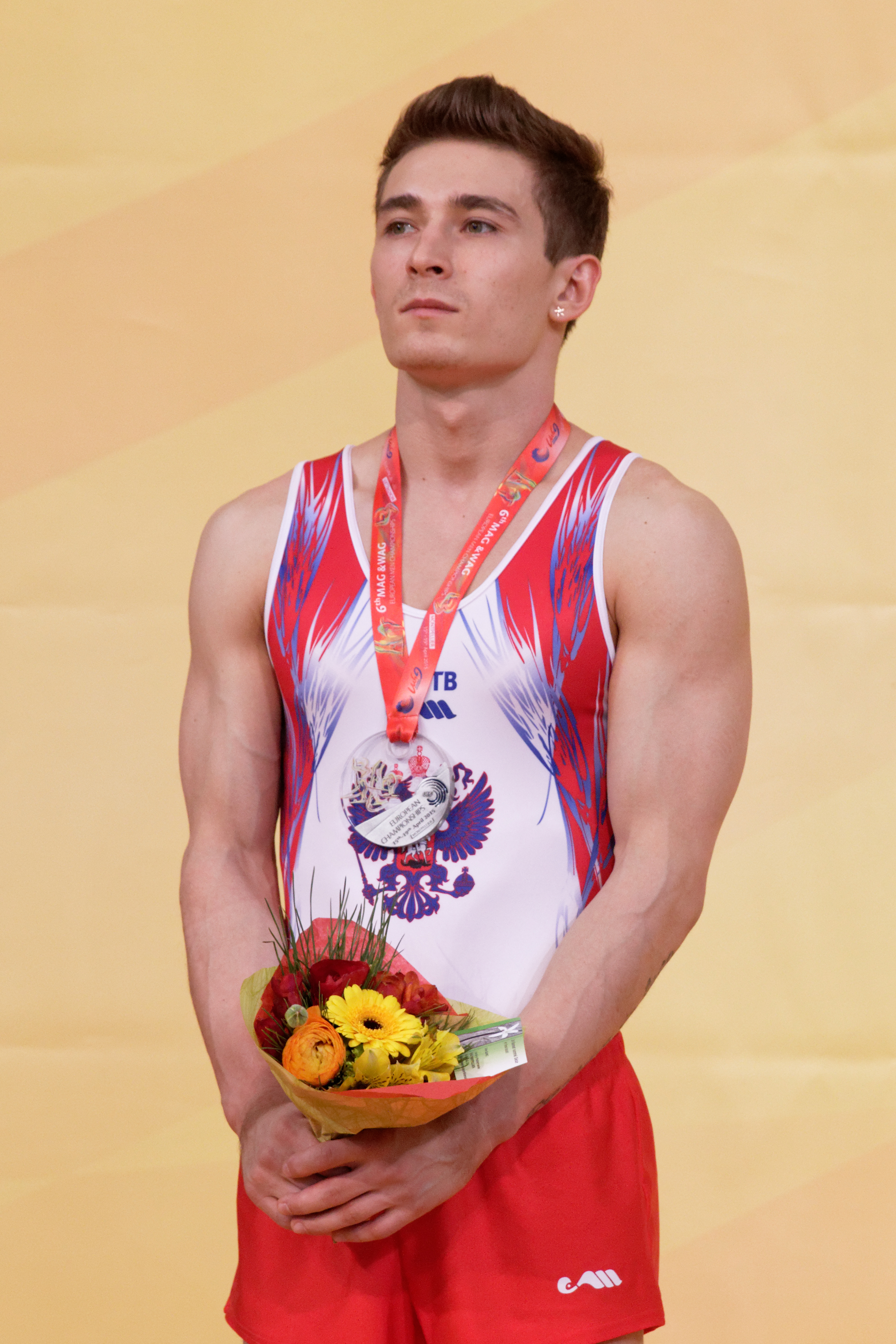
Belyavskiy at the 2015 European Championships

At the 2015 European Championships, Belyavskiy qualified to the all-around final in sixth and in third to the floor exercise final. In the all-around final he fell on pommel horse in the second rotation, but made a comeback and won silver behind Oleg Verniaiev. During event finals Belyavskiy also won silver on floor exercise behind Briton Kristian Thomas.

In June, Belyavskiy competed at the 2015 European Games, winning gold in the team competition. Due to a wrist injury, he did not compete in the all-around, but he qualified for the floor exercise, pommel horse, and parallel bars finals. He won the bronze on floor exericse, placed fourth on pommel horse, and won silver on the parallel bars, only 0.033 points behind winner Oleg Stepko.

At the 2015 World Championships Belyavskiy competed on all events in the team final to help team Russia finish in fourth place. In the all-around final he placed eleventh after falling on vault.

=== 2016 ===
At the 2016 Russian National Championships Belyavskiy won a gold medal with his team. After the first day he was leading the all around competition with a score of 90.367 however on the second day he suffered multiple falls and mistakes to place 4th score 86.266, giving him a total of 176.633 to win the bronze medal behind Nikolai Kuksenkov and Nikita Nagornyy. He defended his national title on the parallel bars, winning for the 5th consecutive year.

In May, Belyavskiy competed at the 2016 European Championships. During the qualification round he competed on every event except rings to help Russia qualify in first place to the team final, as well as qualifying himself to four event finals: floor exercise, pommel horse, parallel bars, and horizontal bar. During the team final Belyavskiy again competed on every event except rings, helping Russia to win team gold with a score of 271.378, nearly 3 points ahead of Great Britain. During event finals he became European champion on parallel bars ahead of 2014 world champion Oleg Verniaiev. He also won bronze on horizontal bar, silver on pommel horse, and placed fourth on floor exercise, making him the most decorated gymnast at the European Championships. He was also awarded the Longines Prize for Elegance.

On August 6–16, Belyavskiy competed at the 2016 Olympic Games alongside Ivan Stretovich, Denis Ablyazin, Nikolai Kuksenkov, and Nikita Nagornyy. Together they qualified in third place to the team final, with Belyavskiy also qualifying to the all around, pommel horse, and parallel bars finals. During the team final he contributed scores on all apparatuses besides rings towards the Russian team's silver medal finish, the first Olympic team medal for Russia since 2000, and the first major team medal for Russia since the 2006 World Championships. In the all around final Belyavskiy finished fourth with a score of 90.498, only 0.143 behind bronze medalist Max Whitlock. In the pommel horse final he finished in fifth, and in the parallel bars final he won the bronze medal behind former World Champions Oleg Verniaiev and Danell Leyva.

=== 2017 ===
Belyavskiy was not initially planning to compete in the 2017 Russian National Championships due to kidney stone problems, however he decided to compete anyway. He did not compete in the all around competition, showing routines on every event except rings in the qualification round. Balyavskiy was unable to defend his nation title on parallel bars as he did not qualify for the event final; however he did win his first national titles on pommel horse and horizontal bar. He also placed fifth on the floor exercise. Belyavskiy was then named to the team for the 2017 European Championships. At these championships, Belavskiy performed well, winning gold on the pommel horse, bronze on the horizontal bar, and placing fourth on the parallel bars. At the 2017 World Championships Belyavskiy qualified to the all-around, pommel horse, parallel bars, and horizontal bar finals. During the all-around final he was leading after the first five rotations; during he final apparatus he fell off of the horizontal bar and ended the competition in fourth place. During apparatus event finals he won silver on pommel horse behind Max Whitlock, bronze on parallel bars behind Zou Jingyuan and Verniaiev, and placed sixth on horizontal bar.

=== 2018 ===
Belyavskiy competed in the 2018 Russian National Championships, winning gold on pommel horse and silver in the all-around and on rings and horizontal bar. He also placed fourth on floor exercise. He next competed at the 2018 European Championships, helping Russia win the team bronze medal. Individually he won silver on parallel bars and placed fourth on pommel horse. At the 2018 World Championships Belyavskiy helped Russia win silver in the team event. Individually he finished seventh on pommel horse.

=== 2019 ===
In June, Belyavskiy competed at the European Games in Minsk, Belarus. He placed first all-around, eighth on floor exercise, fifth on high bar, fourth on parallel bars, first on pommel horse, and eighth on rings.

In October, Belyavskiy was part of the Russian gold-medal-winning squad who won the all-around team event gold medal at the 2019 Artistic Gymnastics World Championships in Stuttgart, Germany. He also placed eighth in the individual pommel horse event final.

=== 2021 ===
Belyavskiy competed at the Russian Championships where he finished third in the all-around behind Aleksandr Kartsev and Artur Dalaloyan. He was selected to compete at the upcoming European Championships. He qualified to the all-around, pommel horse, parallel bars, and horizontal bar event finals. During the all-around final he finished second behind compatriot Nikita Nagornyy. During event finals he won gold on horizontal bar, silver on parallel bars behind Ferhat Arıcan, and placed sixth on pommel horse. Belyavskiy next competed at the Russian Cup where he won gold on pommel horse and parallel bars. Afterwards he was selected to represent the Russian Olympic Committee at the 2020 Summer Olympics alongside Denis Ablyazin, Dalaloyan, and Nagornyy.

At the 2020 Summer Olympics in Tokyo Belyavskiy helped the team qualify to the team final in third place and individually qualified to the pommel horse and parallel bars event finals; he finished tenth in the all-around qualification but did not advance to the final due to Nagornyy and Dalaloyan placing higher. During the team final Belyavskiy competed on three events and helped the team finish first with a combined score of 262.500; this was the first team Olympic gold medal for Russian athletes in 25 years.

On 11 September, he along with his Olympic Team were awarded with Order of Friendship by President Vladimir Putin.

== Competitive history ==
Year	Event	Team	AA	FX	PH	SR	VT	PB	HB
2010	National Championships	2nd place, silver medalist(s)	6				2nd place, silver medalist(s)	3rd place, bronze medalist(s)	5
2010	Russian Cup		4	1st place, gold medalist(s)	8		2nd place, silver medalist(s)	5	5
2010	World Championships	6							
2011	National Championships	5							
2011	Russian Cup		4	6	2nd place, silver medalist(s)			8	
2011	World Championships	4	6						
2012	National Championships	7	4	3rd place, bronze medalist(s)	8			1st place, gold medalist(s)	
2012	European Championships	2nd place, silver medalist(s)							
2012	Olympic Games	6	5		7				
2013	National Championships	5	1st place, gold medalist(s)	2nd place, silver medalist(s)	5			1st place, gold medalist(s)	
2013	European Championships		1st place, gold medalist(s)	5				3rd place, bronze medalist(s)	
2013	Universiade	1st place, gold medalist(s)	3rd place, bronze medalist(s)	3rd place, bronze medalist(s)				2nd place, silver medalist(s)	
2013	World Championships		12						
2014	National Championships	1st place, gold medalist(s)	1st place, gold medalist(s)	3rd place, bronze medalist(s)	2nd place, silver medalist(s)			1st place, gold medalist(s)	2nd place, silver medalist(s)
2014	European Championships	1st place, gold medalist(s)		8				2nd place, silver medalist(s)	
2014	World Championships	5	5						5
2015	National Championships	2nd place, silver medalist(s)	1st place, gold medalist(s)	4	2nd place, silver medalist(s)			1st place, gold medalist(s)	7
2015	European Championships		2nd place, silver medalist(s)	2nd place, silver medalist(s)					
2015	European Games	1st place, gold medalist(s)		3rd place, bronze medalist(s)	4			2nd place, silver medalist(s)	
2015	World Championships	4	11						
2016	National Championships	1st place, gold medalist(s)	3rd place, bronze medalist(s)	4	2nd place, silver medalist(s)	4		1st place, gold medalist(s)	5
2016	European Championships	1st place, gold medalist(s)		4	2nd place, silver medalist(s)			1st place, gold medalist(s)	3rd place, bronze medalist(s)
2016	Olympic Games	2nd place, silver medalist(s)	4		5			3rd place, bronze medalist(s)	
2017	National Championships	5		5	1st place, gold medalist(s)				1st place, gold medalist(s)
2017	European Championships				1st place, gold medalist(s)			4	3rd place, bronze medalist(s)
2017	Russian Cup	4	2nd place, silver medalist(s)	2nd place, silver medalist(s)	1st place, gold medalist(s)			6	4
2017	World Championships		4		2nd place, silver medalist(s)			3rd place, bronze medalist(s)	6
2018	National Championships	3rd place, bronze medalist(s)	2nd place, silver medalist(s)	4	1st place, gold medalist(s)	2nd place, silver medalist(s)			2nd place, silver medalist(s)
2018	Russian Cup	3rd place, bronze medalist(s)		7	1st place, gold medalist(s)			1st place, gold medalist(s)	7
2018	European Championships	1st place, gold medalist(s)			4			2nd place, silver medalist(s)	
2018	World Championships	2nd place, silver medalist(s)			7				
2019
2019	European Games		1st place, gold medalist(s)		1st place, gold medalist(s)			4	5
2019	Russian Cup		4	8	2nd place, silver medalist(s)			3rd place, bronze medalist(s)	1st place, gold medalist(s)
2019	World Championships	1st place, gold medalist(s)			8				
2021	National Championships		3rd place, bronze medalist(s)		1st place, gold medalist(s)				
2021	European Championships		2nd place, silver medalist(s)		6			2nd place, silver medalist(s)	1st place, gold medalist(s)
2021	Olympic Games	1st place, gold medalist(s)			4			5	
2022	National Championships	7						1st place, gold medalist(s)	

== See also ==
- List of Olympic male artistic gymnasts for Russia
