= Artur Dalaloyan =

Russian artistic gymnast

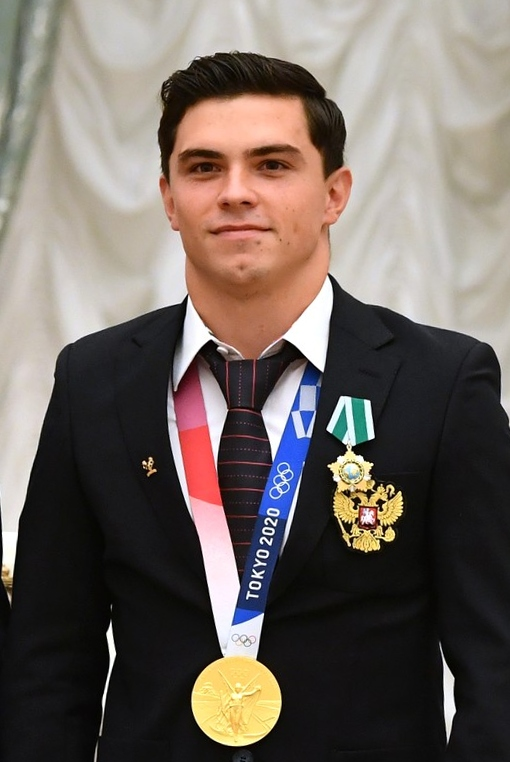
- Dalaloyan at the Kremlin in 2021

Personal information
- Full name: Artur Grachyevich Dalaloyan
- Nickname: King Artur
- Born: 26 April 1996 (age 30) Tiraspol, Moldova
- Height: 1.62 m (5 ft 4 in)

Gymnastics career
- Discipline: Men's artistic gymnastics
- Country represented: Russia (2013–present)
- Club: Dynamo Moscow
- Gym: Round Lake
- Head coach: Valery Alfosov
- Assistant coaches: Aleksandr Kalinin, Shapkin SA
- Eponymous skills: "Dalaloyan" (Parallel Bars) Double salto forward piked with 1/2 turn (G)
Medal record
Men's artistic gymnastics
Representing Russia & ROC
Event	1st	2nd	3rd
Olympic Games	1	0	0
World Championships	3	4	2
European Championships	5	2	3
Total	9	6	5
Representing (Russia) ROC
Olympic Games
Gold medal – first place	2020 Tokyo	Team
Representing Russia
World Championships
Gold medal – first place	2018 Doha	All-Around
Gold medal – first place	2018 Doha	Floor Exercise
Gold medal – first place	2019 Stuttgart	Team
Silver medal – second place	2018 Doha	Team
Silver medal – second place	2018 Doha	Vault
Silver medal – second place	2019 Stuttgart	All-Around
Silver medal – second place	2019 Stuttgart	Vault
Bronze medal – third place	2018 Doha	Parallel Bars
Bronze medal – third place	2019 Stuttgart	Horizontal Bar
European Championships
Gold medal – first place	2017 Cluj-Napoca	Vault
Gold medal – first place	2018 Glasgow	Team
Gold medal – first place	2018 Glasgow	Vault
Gold medal – first place	2018 Glasgow	Parallel Bars
Gold medal – first place	2019 Szczecin	Floor Exercise
Silver medal – second place	2017 Cluj-Napoca	All-Around
Silver medal – second place	2019 Szczecin	All-Around
Bronze medal – third place	2018 Glasgow	Floor Exercise
Bronze medal – third place	2019 Szczecin	Vault
Bronze medal – third place	2019 Szczecin	Horizontal Bar
- Awards: Longines Prize for Elegance; Merited Master of Sport of Russia

Artur Grachyevich Dalaloyan (Russian: Артур Грачьевич Далалоян) born 26 April 1996 is a Russian artistic gymnast who represented ROC at the 2020 Summer Olympics. He was part of the teams who won gold at the 2020 Olympic Games and 2019 World Championships and silver at the 2018 World Championships. Individually Dalaloyan is the 2018 World All-Around Champion and the 2019 World All-Around silver medalist. He is a nine-time world medalist and a five-time European champion.

== Personal life ==
Dalaloyan was born in Tiraspol, Moldova to an Armenian father and a Russian mother. He has a younger brother. Their parents later moved to Russia. Dalaloyan started doing gymnastics at age six, while still living in Novosibirsk. A year later, his family relocated to Moscow and he began training under Aleksandr Kalinin. Dalaloyan's father left when he was young and is not in contact with him.

While a schoolboy, he performed as a backup dancer for Russia's entrant Alexandra Golovchenko in the Junior Eurovision Song Contest 2007.

He married Olga Borodina, after proposing in 2019. They have two daughters together, Nicole (born 2019), and Karolina (born 2021). Olga additionally has a son, Stepan, from a previous relationship.

== Career ==
=== Junior ===
In his junior career, Dalaloyan won bronze in the all-around the 2013 Russian Junior Nationals. He competed at the 2013 Gymnasiade in Brasília where Russia won the team gold ahead of Great Britain.

=== Senior ===
==== 2015–17 ====
In 2015 and 2016, He competed in the Russian Championships however, Dalaloyan was not selected as an entry list or alternate for the 2016 Rio Olympics. On December 18–22, Dalaloyan won the all-around gold at the Voronin Cup.

In 2017, Dalaloyan had a career breakthrough where he became the 2017 Russian National all-around champion. He then competed in his first major senior event at the 2017 European Championships where he won the all-around silver medal behind Ukraine's Oleg Verniaiev. He qualified in the vault finals where he won the gold medal ahead of Marian Drăgulescu. On August 23–27, Dalaloyan competed at the Russian Cup in Ekaterinburg, he won gold in team, in the all-around after bombing in pommel horse; he slipped into 4th place behind Nikita Ignatyev. In the apparatus finals, Dalaloyan won gold in vault (tied with Nikita Nagornyy) and two silver medals on Parallel Bars and Floor Exercise.

==== 2018 ====
In 2018, Dalaloyan became all-around World Champion. He became the first Russian to achieve that feat since 1999 (when Nikolai Kryukov won in that discipline). He earned 87.598 total points, as did Xiao Ruoteng, though after tie-breaking rules were enforced (which drop the lowest exercise score), Dalaloyan was named All-Around Champion. In event finals, Dalaloyan then won gold on floor exercise, silver on vault, and bronze on parallel bars. He was also awarded the Longines Prize for Elegance.

==== 2019 ====
At the 2019 European Artistic Gymnastics Championships in Szczecin, Poland, Dalaloyan placed second all-around, first on floor exercise, and third on vault and high bar.

At the 2019 World Artistic Gymnastics Championships, Dalaloyan won with his team, the Russian Federation's first World Championship Team Gold medal, and a silver medal in the Individual All Around competition behind teammate Nikita Nagornyy.

==== 2021 ====
At the Russian National Championships Dalaloyan placed second behind Aleksandr Kartsev. He was selected to compete at the upcoming European Championships but had to withdraw to a partial Achilles ligament tear. In June Dalaloyan was selected to represent the Russian Olympic Committee at the 2020 Summer Olympics alongside Denis Ablyazin, David Belyavskiy, and Nikita Nagornyy.

At the Olympic Games Dalaloyan helped the Russian athletes qualify to the team final in third place and individually he qualified to the all-around final despite his recent injury. During the team final he competed on all six events and helped the team win gold with a score of 262.5; this was the first team Olympic gold medal for Russian athletes in 25 years. During the all-around final Dalaloyan finished sixth.

On 11 September, Dalaloyan along with his Olympic Team were awarded with Order of Friendship medals by President Vladimir Putin.

2024

In June 2024, he became the silver medalist of the BRICS Games in the ring exercises and in the individual all-around.

Participant of the first season of the extreme sports TV show "Super Ninja" on the CTC channel. In 2024, he took part in the first season of the TNT channel's Titans show under the number "1", and reached the final release.

== Competitive history ==
Year	Event	Team	AA	FX	PH	SR	VT	PB	HB
Junior
2012	Olympic Hopes Penza	1st place, gold medalist(s)	3rd place, bronze medalist(s)	2nd place, silver medalist(s)					3rd place, bronze medalist(s)
2012	Russian Junior Championships	3rd place, bronze medalist(s)							
2012	Alexander Dityatin Cup		1st place, gold medalist(s)	8		1st place, gold medalist(s)	3rd place, bronze medalist(s)	1st place, gold medalist(s)	
2012	Voronin Junior Cup		24	1st place, gold medalist(s)		4			
2013	Olympic Hopes Penza	1st place, gold medalist(s)	2nd place, silver medalist(s)		4	1st place, gold medalist(s)			1st place, gold medalist(s)
2013	International Junior Japan		7		7	2nd place, silver medalist(s)		7	3rd place, bronze medalist(s)
2013	Gymnasiade	1st place, gold medalist(s)	3rd place, bronze medalist(s)			1st place, gold medalist(s)			2nd place, silver medalist(s)
2013	Valeri Liukin Invitational	6	8						
2014
2014	Junior European Championships	2nd place, silver medalist(s)				4	7		
Senior
2014	Voronin Cup			7					6
2015	National Championships	4	8	3rd place, bronze medalist(s)					
2015	Russian Cup	2nd place, silver medalist(s)	6				3rd place, bronze medalist(s)		
2015	Voronin Cup	2nd place, silver medalist(s)	5	3rd place, bronze medalist(s)			3rd place, bronze medalist(s)		
2016	National Championships	3rd place, bronze medalist(s)					3rd place, bronze medalist(s)		
2016	Voronin Cup		1st place, gold medalist(s)	2nd place, silver medalist(s)					
2017	National Championships	1st place, gold medalist(s)		8	6		2nd place, silver medalist(s)	4	6
2017	European Championships		2nd place, silver medalist(s)				1st place, gold medalist(s)		
2017	Russian Cup	1st place, gold medalist(s)	4	2nd place, silver medalist(s)		4	1st place, gold medalist(s)	2nd place, silver medalist(s)	
2017	World Championships						8		
2018	Tokyo World Cup		4						
2018	National Championships	1st place, gold medalist(s)	1st place, gold medalist(s)	2nd place, silver medalist(s)		3rd place, bronze medalist(s)		5	6
2018	Russian Cup	1st place, gold medalist(s)	1st place, gold medalist(s)	2nd place, silver medalist(s)		2nd place, silver medalist(s)	7	4	2nd place, silver medalist(s)
2018	European Championships	1st place, gold medalist(s)		3rd place, bronze medalist(s)			1st place, gold medalist(s)		
2018	World Championships	2nd place, silver medalist(s)	1st place, gold medalist(s)				2nd place, silver medalist(s)	3rd place, bronze medalist(s)	8
2019
2019	European Championships		2nd place, silver medalist(s)	1st place, gold medalist(s)			3rd place, bronze medalist(s)	4	3rd place, bronze medalist(s)
2019	World Championships	1st place, gold medalist(s)	2nd place, silver medalist(s)	4			2nd place, silver medalist(s)		3rd place, bronze medalist(s)
2019	Arthur Gander Memorial		2nd place, silver medalist(s)			1st place, gold medalist(s)		2nd place, silver medalist(s)	
2020	Friendship & Solidarity Meet	2nd place, silver medalist(s)							
2021	National Championships	3rd place, bronze medalist(s)	2nd place, silver medalist(s)	1st place, gold medalist(s)		3rd place, bronze medalist(s)	1st place, gold medalist(s)	2nd place, silver medalist(s)	6
2021	Olympic Games	1st place, gold medalist(s)	6						
2022	National Championships	3rd place, bronze medalist(s)	1st place, gold medalist(s)						
2024	BRICS Games		2nd place, silver medalist(s)			2nd place, silver medalist(s)			

== Eponymous skills ==
Dalaloyan has one skill named after him in the Code of Points (CoP)—a dismount in parallel bars.

Apparatus	Name	Description	Difficulty	Competition Completed—Notes
Parallel bars	Dalaloyan	Double salto forward piked with 1/2 turn	G	2019 European Championships; Skill already in the CoP but awaiting successful completion in competition.
