= Grigorii Klimentev =

Russian artistic gymnast

Grigorii Klimentev Григорий Климентьев
- Full name: Grigorii Grigorievich Klimentev
- Nickname: Grisha
- Born: 13 December 2000 (age 25)

Gymnastics career
- Discipline: Men's artistic gymnastics
- Country represented: Russia (2015–present)
- Club: Petrozavodsk School of Supreme Sports Skill/Natalia Lavrova Gymnastics Sports School of Olympic Reserve/Dynamo Moscow
- Head coaches: Pavel Pavlov, Sergey Starkin, Matvey Talia
Medal record
Men's artistic gymnastics
Representing RGF
World Championships
Bronze medal – third place	2021 Kitakyushu	Rings
Representing Russia
FIG World Cup
Event	1st	2nd	3rd
World Challenge Cup	1	0	0
Total	1	0	0

Grigorii Klimentev (Russian: Григорий Григорьевич Климентьев; born 13 December 2000) is a Russian artistic gymnast. At the 2021 World Championships he won the bronze medal in still rings, sharing it in a tie with Salvatore Maresca. He also had won a gold medal on still rings in the Mersin leg of the 2021 FIG Artistic Gymnastics World Cup series.

== Career ==
Klimentev began gymnastics at age five in Petrozavodsk, Russia.

In 2018 he became the European Junior Champion on still rings and won the Team title along with teammates Yuri Busse, Viktor Kalyuzhin, Mikhail Khudchenko and Sergei Naidin.

In 2021 Klimentev became the Russian Champion on still rings, beating veteran Denis Ablyazin. He made his senior international debut at the Mersin World Cup where he won gold on still rings. He was one of the athletes representing RGF at the 2021 World Championships where he won the bronze medal on still rings.

== Competitive history ==
Year	Event	Team	AA	FX	PH	SR	VT	PB	HB
Junior
2014	Hopes of Russia		22			3rd place, bronze medalist(s)		5	
2015	Russian Junior Championships (CMS)		15			3rd place, bronze medalist(s)		3rd place, bronze medalist(s)	
2015	Youth Spartakiad	20	20			2nd place, silver medalist(s)			5
2015	Hopes of Russia			4		4			
2016	Northwestern Federal Championships	1st place, gold medalist(s)	1st place, gold medalist(s)	1st place, gold medalist(s)	1st place, gold medalist(s)	1st place, gold medalist(s)		1st place, gold medalist(s)	1st place, gold medalist(s)
2016	Hopes of Russia		18	3rd place, bronze medalist(s)					
2017	Russian Junior Championships	1st place, gold medalist(s)	6	2nd place, silver medalist(s)		5		4	
2017	Prize of the Olympic Champion A. Nemov	6	8	2nd place, silver medalist(s)		4		6	5
2017	Prize of the Olympic Champion S. Khorkina		1st place, gold medalist(s)	1st place, gold medalist(s)		1st place, gold medalist(s)	1st place, gold medalist(s)	3rd place, bronze medalist(s)	5
2017	Voronin Cup Junior		23						
2018
2018	European Junior Championships	1st place, gold medalist(s)				1st place, gold medalist(s)		29	
Senior
2018	Volga Federal Championships	2nd place, silver medalist(s)				6		8	
2018	Russian Cup					4			
2019	Volga Federal Championship					1st place, gold medalist(s)			
2019	National Championships					6			
2019	Russian Cup					4			
2019	Voronin Cup					1st place, gold medalist(s)			
2020	Volga Federal Championships					1st place, gold medalist(s)			
2020	National Championships					4			
2020	Voronin Cup					4			
2021	Volga Federal Championships					2nd place, silver medalist(s)			
2021	National Championships					1st place, gold medalist(s)			
2021	Russian Cup					2nd place, silver medalist(s)			
2021	World Cup Mersin					1st place, gold medalist(s)			
2021	World Championships					3rd place, bronze medalist(s)			
2022
2022	National Championships					1st place, gold medalist(s)			
2022	Spartakiad					1st place, gold medalist(s)			
