= Cup of Russia in artistic gymnastics =

Russian gymnastics competition

The Cup of Russia in artistic gymnastics, or Russian Cup in artistic gymnastics (Russian: Кубок России по спортивной гимнастике) is an annual Russian national artistic gymnastics competition. It is organized by the Ministry of Sports and the Artistic Gymnastics Federation of Russia and is financed from the federal budget. In the recent years, the Russian Cup is traditionally held in August and serves as a qualifying tournament for the autumn World Championships.

== Women's medalists ==
=== Team ===
Year	Location	Gold	Silver	Bronze
2026	Sirius	Moscow	Krasnodar Krai	Vladimir Oblast

=== All-around ===
Year	Location	Gold	Silver	Bronze
2007	Chelyabinsk	Kristina Pravdina	Svetlana Klyukina	Yulia Lozhechko
2008				
2009				
2010	Chelyabinsk	Aliya Mustafina	Ksenia Afanasyeva	Ksenia Semyonova
2011	Yekaterinburg	Anna Dementyeva	Viktoria Komova	Yulia Belokobylskaya
2012	Penza	Viktoria Komova	Aliya Mustafina	Yulia Inshina
2013	Penza	Tatiana Nabieva	Alla Sosnitskaya	Anna Pavlova
2014	Penza	Aliya Mustafina	Maria Kharenkova	Daria Spiridonova
2015	Penza	Daria Spiridonova	Seda Tutkhalyan	Maria Kharenkova
2016	Penza	Angelina Melnikova	Seda Tutkhalyan	Aliya Mustafina
2017	Ekaterinburg	Angelina Melnikova	Elena Eremina	Maria Kharenkova
2018	Chelyabinsk	Angelina Melnikova	Anastasia Ilyankova	Viktoria Komova
2019	Penza	Vladislava Urazova	Angelina Melnikova	Elena Gerasimova
2021	Novosibirsk	Viktoria Listunova	Vladislava Urazova	Angelina Melnikova
2022	Kaluga	Angelina Melnikova	Vladislava Urazova	Maria Minaeva
2023	Adler	Viktoria Listunova	Leila Vasileva	Zlata Osokina
2024	Novosibirsk	Anna Kalmykova	Alyona Glotova	Uliana Perebinosova
2025	Novosibirsk	Anna Kalmykova	Leila Vasileva	Liudmila Roshchina
2026	Sirius	Anna Kalmykova	Liudmila Roshchina	Angelina Melnikova

=== Vault ===
Year	Location	Gold	Silver	Bronze
2026	Sirius	Anna Kalmykova	Aleksandra Anufrieva	Alesya Branitskaya

=== Uneven Bars ===
Year	Location	Gold	Silver	Bronze
2026	Sirius	Viktoria Listunova	Anna Kalmykova	Anna Smirnova

=== Balance Beam ===
Year	Location	Gold	Silver	Bronze
2026	Sirius	Anna Kalmykova	Liudmila Roshchina	Elizaveta Us

=== Floor Exercise ===
Year	Location	Gold	Silver	Bronze
2026	Sirius	Liudmila Roshchina	Angelina Melnikova	Anna Kalmykova

== Men’s medalists ==
=== Team ===
Year	Location	Gold	Silver	Bronze
2011	Yekaterinburg	Moscow	Central Federal District	Siberian Federal District
2012	Penza	Central Federal District Northwestern Federal District	Not Awarded	Ural Federal District
2013	Penza	Siberian Federal District	Volga Federal District	Ural Federal District
2014	Penza	Ural Federal District	Siberian Federal District	Volga Federal District
2015	Penza	Siberian Federal District	Moscow	Central Federal District
2016	Penza	Siberian Federal District	Volga Federal District	Moscow
2017	Ekaterinburg	Moscow	Siberian Federal District	Volga Federal District
2018	Chelyabinsk	Moscow	Central Federal District	Ural Federal District
2025	Novosibirsk	Vladimir Oblast	Moscow	Tatarstan
2026	Sirius	Moscow	Vladimir Oblast	Republic of Tatarstan

=== All-around ===
Year	Location	Gold	Silver	Bronze
2010	Chelyabinsk	Sergei Khorokhordin	Igor Pakhomenko	Maxim Deviatovski
2011	Yekaterinburg	Emin Garibov	Sergei Khorokhordin	Nikita Ignatyev^{(ru)}
2012	Penza	David Belyavskiy	Sergei Khorokhordin	Igor Pakhomenko
2013	Penza	Dmitry Stolyarov	Nikita Ignatyev^{(ru)}	Nikita Lezhankin
2014	Penza	Nikita Ignatyev^{(ru)}	David Belyavskiy	Mikhail Kudashov
2015	Penza	Nikita Ignatyev	Nikolai Kuksenkov	David Belyavskiy
2016	Penza	Nikolai Kuksenkov	Vladislav Polyashov	Nikita Ignatyev
2017	Ekaterinburg	Nikita Nagornyy	David Belyavskiy	Nikita Ignatyev
2018	Chelyabinsk	Artur Dalaloyan	Vladislav Polyashov	Alexey Rostov
2019	Penza	Nikita Nagornyy	Ivan Stretovich	Artur Dalaloyan
2021	Novosibirsk	Nikita Nagornyy	Alexsandr Kartsev	Nikita Ignatyev
2022	Kaluga	Nikita Nagornyy	Daniel Marinov	David Belyavskiy
2023	Adler	Daniel Marinov	Sergei Naidin	Ivan Kuliak
2024	Novosibirsk	Daniel Marinov	Kirill Prokopev	Ivan Zavrichko
2025	Novosibirsk	Mukhammadzhon Yakubov	Ivan Kuliak	Aleksandr Kartsev
2026	Sirius	Arsenii Dukhno	Daniel Marinov	Saveliy Syedin

=== Floor Exercise ===
Year	Location	Gold	Silver	Bronze
2011	Yekaterinburg	Denis Ablyazin	Andrey Cherkasov	Dmitry Barkalov
2012	Penza	Nikita Ignatyev	Sergey Khorokhordin	David Belyavskiy
2013	Penza	Daniil Kazachkov	Dmitry Stolyarov Kirill Prokopev	Not Awarded
2014	Penza	David Belyavskiy	Vladislav Polyashov	Mikhail Kudashov
2015	Penza	Denis Ablyazin	David Belyavskiy	Nikita Ignatyev
2016	Penza	Denis Ablyazin	Nikita Ignatyev	Nikolai Kuksenkov
2017	Ekaterinburg	Nikita Nagornyy	Artur Dalaloyan	David Belyavskiy
2018	Chelyabinsk	Nikita Nagornyy	Artur Dalaloyan	Kirill Prokopev
2019	Penza	Nikita Nagornyy	Kirill Prokopev	Andrei Makolov
2021	Novosibirsk	Ivan Stretovich	Aleksandr Kartsev	Mukhammadzhon Iakubov
2022	Kaluga	Kirill Prokopev	Daniel Marinov	David Belyavskiy
2023	Adler	Yahor Sharamkou	Nikita Nagornyy	Kirill Prokopev
2024	Novosibirsk	Daniel Marinov	Kirill Prokopev	Sergei Naidin
2025	Novosibirsk	Mukhammadzhon Iakubov	Ivan Kuliak	Andrei Dimitriev
2026	Sirius	Arsenii Dukhno	Mukhammadzhon Yakubov	Evgeniy Kisel

=== Pommel Horse ===
Year	Location	Gold	Silver	Bronze
2011	Yekaterinburg	Andrey Perevoznikov	David Belyavskiy	Vladimir Olennikov
2012	Penza	David Belyavskiy	Andrey Perevoznikov	Igor Pakhomenko
2013	Penza	Matvei Petrov	Andrey Perevoznikov	Mikhail Kudashov
2014	Penza	Nikolai Kuksenkov	David Belyavskiy	Ivan Stretovich
2015	Penza	Nikolai Kuksenkov	Ivan Stretovich	Nikita Ignatyev
2016	Penza	Vladislav Poliashov	Ivan Stretovich	Sergei Danilenko Nikita Ignatyev
2017	Ekaterinburg	David Belyavskiy	Ivan Tikhonov	Nikita Nagornyy
2018	Chelyabinsk	David Belyavskiy	Nikolai Kuksenkov	Vladislav Poliashov
2019	Penza	Nikita Nagornyy	David Belyavskiy	Kirill Prokopev
2021	Novosibirsk	David Belyavskiy	Vladislav Poliashov	Nikita Nagornyy
2022	Kaluga	David Belyavskiy	Vladislav Poliashov	Daniel Marinov
2023	Adler	Vladislav Poliashov	Daniel Marinov	Nikita Andronov
2024	Novosibirsk	Ranel Safiullin	Sergei Naidin	Denis Tovpilets
2025	Novosibirsk	David Belyavskiy	Kirill Prokopev	Sergei Larchev
2026	Sirius	Arsenii Dukhno	Vladislav Polyashov	Ilya Musin Vyacheslav Viktor

=== Still Rings ===
Year	Location	Gold	Silver	Bronze
2011	Yekaterinburg	Konstantin Pluzhnikov	Nikita Ignatyev	Emin Garibov
2012	Penza	Konstantin Pluzhnikov	Denis Ablyazin	Aleksandr Balandin
2013	Penza	Aleksandr Balandin	Daniil Kazachkov	Nikita Ignatyev
2014	Penza	Denis Ablyazin	Pavel Pavlov	Nikita Ignatyev
2015	Penza	Denis Ablyazin	Nikita Ignatyev	Daniil Kazachkov
2016	Penza	Denis Ablyazin Nikita Ignatyev	Not Awarded	Nikolai Kuksenkov
2017	Ekaterinburg	Denis Ablyazin	Nikita Ignatyev	Nikita Nagornyy
2018	Chelyabinsk	Denis Ablyazin	Artur Dalaloyan	Dmitriy Lankin
2019	Penza	Nikita Nagornyy	Artur Dalaloyan	Denis Ablyazin
2021	Novosibirsk	Denis Ablyazin	Grigorii Klimentev	Alexey Rostov
2022	Kaluga	Denis Ablyazin	Viktor Kalyuzhin	Ruslan Makarov
2023	Adler	Ilia Zaika	Oleg Stupkin	Denis Tovpilets
2024	Novosibirsk	Ilia Zaika	Grigorii Klimentev	Viktor Kalyuzhin
2025	Novosibirsk	Ilia Zaika	Viktor Kalyuzhin	Oleg Stupkin
2026	Sirius	Ilia Zaika	Oleg Stupkin	Daniel Marinov

=== Vault ===
Year	Location	Gold	Silver	Bronze
2011	Yekaterinburg	Denis Ablyazin	Mikhail Bodnar	Nikita Lezhankin
2012	Penza	Denis Ablyazin	Dmitry Yakubokovsky	Nikita Lezhankin
2013	Penza	Mikhail Kudashov	Vladislav Kozin	Roman Suetin
2014	Penza	Victor Britan	Roman Suetin	Nikita Lezhankin
2015	Penza	Denis Ablyazin	Nikita Nagornyy	Artur Dalaloyan
2016	Penza	Denis Ablyazin	Mikhail Kudashov	Dmitriy Lankin Victor Britan
2017	Ekaterinburg	Nikita Nagornyy Artur Dalaloyan	Not Awarded	Dmitriy Lankin
2018	Chelyabinsk	Denis Ablyazin	Dmitriy Lankin	Victor Britan
2019	Penza	Artur Dalaloyan	Andrei Makolov	Dmitriy Lankin
2021	Novosibirsk	Nikita Nagornyy	Denis Ablyazin	Vladislav Novokshonov
2022	Kaluga	Denis Ablyazin	Daniel Marinov	Evgeniy Pashkin
2023	Adler	Nikita Nagornyy	Daniel Marinov	Mukhammadzhon Iakubov
2024	Novosibirsk	Alexsei Usachev	Mukhammadzhon Iakubov	Daniel Marinov
2025	Novosibirsk	Aleksei Usachev	Yahor Sharamkou Mukhammadzhon Iakubov	Denis Tovpilets
2026	Sirius	Daniel Marinov	Aleksei Usachev	Arsenii Dukhno

=== Parallel Bars ===
Year	Location	Gold	Silver	Bronze
2011	Yekaterinburg	Nikita Ignatyev	Dmitry Gogotov	Maksim Devyatovskiy
2012	Penza	David Belyavskiy	Sergey Khorokhordin	Nikita Ignatyev
2013	Penza	Dmitry Gogotov	Aleksandr Balandin	Pavel Pavlov
2014	Penza	Nikolai Kuksenkov	Nikita Ignatyev	Roman Suetin
2015	Penza	David Belyavskiy	Nikita Ignatyev	Nikolai Kuksenkov
2016	Penza	Ivan Stretovich	Artur Dalaloyan	Dmitriy Lankin
2017	Ekaterinburg	Sergei Eltsov	Artur Dalaloyan	Dmitriy Lankin
2018	Chelyabinsk	David Belyavskiy	Dmitriy Lankin	Sergei Eltsov
2019	Penza	Sergei Eltsov	Artur Dalaloyan	David Belyavskiy
2021	Novosibirsk	David Belyavskiy	Nikita Nagornyy	Ivan Kuliak
2022	Kaluga	Daniel Marinov	Vladislav Poliashov	David Belyavskiy
2023	Adler	Daniel Marinov	David Belyavskiy	Nikita Nagornyy
2024	Novosibirsk	Daniel Marinov	Vladislav Poliashov	Ivan Zavrichko
2025	Novosibirsk	Ivan Kuliak	Aleksandr Kartsev	David Belyavskiy
2026	Sirius	Daniel Marinov	Saveliy Syedin	Mukhammadzhon Yakubov

=== Horizontal Bar ===
Year	Location	Gold	Silver	Bronze
2011	Yekaterinburg	Emin Garibov	Mikhail Bodnar	Maksim Devyatovskiy
2012	Penza	Nikita Ignatyev	David Belyavskiy	Sergey Khorokhordin
2013	Penza	Pavel Russinyak	Daniil Kazachkov	Vladislav Kozin
2014	Penza	Nikita Ignatyev	Nikolai Kuksenkov	Igor Pakhomenko
2015	Penza	Nikita Ignatyev Nikolai Kuksenkov	Not Awarded	David Belyavskiy
2016	Penza	Ivan Stretovich	Alexey Rostov	Vladislav Poliashov
2017	Ekaterinburg	Nikita Ignatyev	Sergei Eltsov	Nikita Nagornyy
2018	Chelyabinsk	Alexey Rostov	Artur Dalaloyan	Maksim Sinichkin
2019	Penza	David Belyavskiy	Sergei Eltsov	Nikita Nagornyy
2021	Novosibirsk	Ivan Stretovich	Nikita Nagornyy	Alexey Rostov
2022	Kaluga	Alexey Rostov	Kirill Prokopev	Ruslan Makarov
2023	Adler	Ivan Gerget	Daniel Novikov	Ivan Kuliak
2024	Novosibirsk	Sergei Naidin	Kirill Gashkov	Daniel Marinov
2025	Novosibirsk	Daniil Novikov	Aleksandr Kartsev	Ivan Kuliak
2026	Sirius	Ivan Antonikhin	Sergei Naidin	Kirill Gashkov
