= Lenn De Smet =

Belgian footballer (born 2004)

Personal information
- Date of birth: 12 April 2004 (age 22)
- Place of birth: Ename, Belgium
- Height: 1.74 m (5 ft 9 in)
- Position: Forward

Team information
- Current team: Kortrijk
- Number: 14

Youth career
- Club Brugge

Senior career*
Years	Team	Apps	(Gls)
2021–2025	Club NXT	77	(19)
2025–	Kortrijk	32	(2)

International career^{‡}
2019–2020	Belgium U16	2	(0)
- * Club domestic league appearances and goals as of 19 April 2026 ‡ National team caps and goals as of 11 March 2021

Lenn De Smet (born 12 April 2004) is a Belgian professional footballer who plays as a forward for Kortrijk. He is the twin brother of teammate Liam De Smet.

== Career statistics ==
=== Club ===
As of 11 March 2021.

Club	Season	League			Cup		Other		Total	
Club	Season	Division	Apps	Goals	Apps	Goals	Apps	Goals	Apps	Goals
Club NXT	2020–21	Proximus League	5	0	–		0	0	5	0
Career total			5	0	0	0	0	0	5	0
