= Gymnastics at the 2022 Mediterranean Games – Men's artistic team all-around =

Men's artistic team all-around at the 2022 Mediterranean Games
- Venue: Miloud Hadefi Complex Omnisport Arena
- Date: 27 June
- Nations: 9
- Winning total: 251.250

Medalists
gold medal	Ferhat Arıcan; Adem Asil; İbrahim Çolak; Sercan Demir; Ahmet Önder	Turkey
silver medal	Nicola Bartolini; Lorenzo Minh Casali; Lay Giannini; Matteo Levantesi; Marco Lodadio	Italy
bronze medal	Cameron-Lie Bernard; Edgar Boulet; Mathias Philippe; Léo Saladino; Julien Saleur	France

The men's artistic team all-around competition at the 2022 Mediterranean Games was held on 26 June 2022 at the Miloud Hadefi Complex Omnisport Arena.

== Qualified teams ==
The following NOCs competed as a team for the event.

- Algeria
- Cyprus
- Egypt
- France
- Greece
- Italy
- Portugal
- Spain
- Turkey

== Final ==
Rank	Team	Floor (gymnastics)	Pommel horse	Rings (gymnastics)	Vault (gymnastics)	Parallel bars	Horizontal bar	Total
1st place, gold medalist(s)	Turkey	42.100 (1)	40.250 (1)	43.150 (1)	41.550 (5)	43.650 (1)	40.550 (1)	251.250
1st place, gold medalist(s)	Ferhat Arıcan (TUR)		13.800		14.100	14.450	12.700	251.250
1st place, gold medalist(s)	Adem Asil (TUR)	14.400	13.300	14.600	13.500	14.050	13.800	251.250
1st place, gold medalist(s)	İbrahim Çolak (TUR)	12.400		14.650				251.250
1st place, gold medalist(s)	Sercan Demir (TUR)	13.450	10.400	13.250	13.150	14.000	13.100	251.250
1st place, gold medalist(s)	Ahmet Önder (TUR)	14.250	13.150	13.900	13.950	15.150	13.650	251.250
2nd place, silver medalist(s)	Italy	39.200 (5)	39.300 (5)	40.900 (3)	43.350 (1)	43.250 (2)	40.100 (2)	246.100
2nd place, silver medalist(s)	Nicola Bartolini (ITA)	14.600	13.700	12.900	14.650	14.050	13.250	246.100
2nd place, silver medalist(s)	Lorenzo Minh Casali (ITA)	13.300	12.950	13.300	14.300	14.150	13.250	246.100
2nd place, silver medalist(s)	Lay Giannini (ITA)		11.700			14.350	13.200	246.100
2nd place, silver medalist(s)	Matteo Levantesi (ITA)	11.300	12.650	13.000	14.400	14.750	13.600	246.100
2nd place, silver medalist(s)	Marco Lodadio (ITA)	3.100		14.600	13.600			246.100
3rd place, bronze medalist(s)	France	39.750 (3)	39.750 (2)	40.250 (4)	40.650 (7)	42.600 (3)	39.900 (4)	242.900
3rd place, bronze medalist(s)	Cameron-Lie Bernard (FRA)		12.250	12.950		14.650		242.900
3rd place, bronze medalist(s)	Edgar Boulet (FRA)	13.600		12.400	13.800		13.250	242.900
3rd place, bronze medalist(s)	Mathias Philippe (FRA)	13.350	12.650	13.700	13.300	14.300	13.500	242.900
3rd place, bronze medalist(s)	Léo Saladino (FRA)	12.100	13.500	13.600	13.100	10.900	11.700	242.900
3rd place, bronze medalist(s)	Julien Saleur (FRA)	12.800	13.600		13.550	13.650	13.150	242.900
4	Spain	40.550 (2)	39.700 (3)	39.800 (2)	41.950 (2)	41.450 (4)	38.450 (6)	241.900
4	Néstor Abad (ESP)			13.350	13.850	13.300	13.250	241.900
4	Thierno Diallo (ESP)	12.500	13.750	12.950	13.650	13.900	11.650	241.900
4	Nicolau Mir (ESP)	13.900	12.500	13.100	14.300	14.250	13.350	241.900
4	Joel Plata (ESP)	13.800	13.450	13.350	13.800	12.250	11.850	241.900
4	Joshua Jack Williams (ESP)	12.850	11.900					241.900
5	Egypt	37.250 (7)	39.650 (4)	41.800 (2)	38.100 (9)	439.750 (6)	40.050 (3)	236.600
5	Ahmed Abdelrahman (EGY)	12.200	13.100	11.700	14.050	12.750	13.100	236.600
5	Ahmed El Maraghy (EGY)						13.650	236.600
5	Zaid Khater (EGY)	11.050	12.950	13.200	10.200	13.300	12.400	236.600
5	Omar Mohamed (EGY)	14.000	13.600	14.300	13.850	13.700	13.300	236.600
5	Ali Zahran (EGY)			14.300				236.600
6	Cyprus	37.450 (6)	38.000 (8)	37.700 (7)	41.900 (3)	41.250 (5)	39.750 (5)	236.050
6	Marios Georgiou (CYP)	13.450	14.200	13.300	13.600	14.100	13.800	236.050
6	Ilias Georgiou (CYP)		12.400		14.400	14.200	13.050	236.050
6	Georgios Angonas (CYP)	10.750	11.150	12.150	13.900	12.950	12.900	236.050
6	Sokratis Pilakouris (CYP)	11.350		12.250				236.050
6	Michalis Chari (CYP)	12.650	11.400	11.750	12.650	11.600	11.500	236.050
7	Greece	36.850 (8)	38.350 (6)	37.450 (9)	41.850 (4)	39.650 (7)	37.750 (7)	231.900
7	Nikolaos Iliopoulos (GRE)	12.550	12.450	13.500	13.850	13.800	13.350	231.900
7	Apostolos Kanellos (GRE)	10.600	11.600			12.800	12.550	231.900
7	Christoforos Konstantinidis (GRE)	5.350		9.750	13.800			231.900
7	Antonios Tantalidis (GRE)	13.700	14.300	12.550	14.200	13.050	11.850	231.900
7	Stefanos Tsolakidis (GRE)			11.400	12.450			231.900
8	Portugal	39.650 (4)	38.100 (7)	38.450 (6)	40.450 (8)	36.750 (9)	37.050 (8)	230.450
8	Guilherme Campos (POR)	13.350	11.400	12.600	13.600	11.550	11.600	230.450
8	Marcelo Marques (POR)	13.100	12.950	11.650	12.850	11.700	11.950	230.450
8	Filipe Almeida (POR)	12.950	12.550	12.950	14.000	12.250	12.450	230.450
8	José Nogueira (POR)	13.200	12.600	12.900	12.250	12.800	12.650	230.450
9	Algeria	36.300 (9)	36.950 (9)	37.550 (8)	40.700 (6)	38.450 (8)	36.450 (9)	226.400
9	Bilal Bellaoui (ALG)	12.850		12.500	13.150	11.900	11.650	226.400
9	Mohamed Bourguieg (ALG)	11.200	10.200	12.550	13.700	12.700	12.050	226.400
9	H'mida Djaber (ALG)	11.400	11.600	12.200	12.950	12.350	9.550	226.400
9	Hillal Metidji (ALG)	12.050	12.950	12.500	13.850	13.400	12.750	226.400
9	Mohamed Yousfi (ALG)		12.400					226.400
