= Dominick Cunningham =

British artistic gymnast

- Full name: Dominick Adam Cunningham
- Born: 9 May 1995 (age 31) Birmingham, England

Gymnastics career
- Discipline: Men's artistic gymnastics
- Country represented: (Republic of Ireland) Ireland; (2013–present)
- Former countries represented: (United Kingdom) Great Britain; England
- Club: City of Birmingham GC
Medal record
Representing Great Britain
European Championships
Gold medal – first place	2018 Glasgow	Floor Exercise
Silver medal – second place	2018 Glasgow	Team
Representing England
Commonwealth Games
Gold medal – first place	2018 Gold Coast	Team
Bronze medal – third place	2018 Gold Coast	Vault

Dominick Adam Cunningham (born 9 May 1995) is an English-born elite artistic gymnast representing Ireland since 2022, having previously represented Great Britain and England. He won a team gold at the 2018 Commonwealth Games, and the Individual Floor Gold at the 2018 European Championships in Glasgow.

== Early life ==
Cunningham was born in Birmingham and is from Kings Heath, a suburb in the south of the West Midlands city. He attended Bishop Challoner Catholic College in Birmingham until 2013.

As a child, Cunningham played football and ice hockey but was captivated by gymnastics the most. His parents supported his interest despite struggling to pay his gymnastics fees. His mother took him to his first gymnastics session aged 5. He started competitions at age 7. He also took some boxing lessons.

Cunningham was regularly bullied at primary school for participating in gymnastics and was subjected to name-calling. Labelled "gay" and accused of taking up a "girls' sport", he has said he felt humiliated and hid in his mother's car, refusing to go into school. Cunningham said, "I was only about 9 or 10 years old at the time and I didn't want to go to school because people were calling me names because of what sport I did. I felt humiliated really. I remember just coming home and crying about it."

Cunningham has trained at City of Birmingham Gymnastics Club in Perry Barr and the Earls Gymnastics Club in Halesowen.

== Gymnastics career ==
Cunningham had success at the junior level at the 2013 Australian Youth Olympic Festival and the 2011 European Youth Olympic Festival.

Cunningham was a member of the British team for the 2017 European Artistic Gymnastics Championships in Cluj-Napoca, Romania in April 2017, advancing to the floor exercise and vault event finals.

=== 2018 ===
At the 2018 Commonwealth Games held in Gold Coast, Australia, Cunningham was part of the team that won gold on the men's all-around event. Although he finished third in the all-around team event behind Nile Wilson and James Hall, he did not qualify for the individual all-around as only two competitors from each country may qualify. He won a bronze on the vault.

Cunningham attended the official handover ceremony at the 2018 Commonwealth Games as an ambassador representing his home city of Birmingham, which will be hosting the 2022 Commonwealth Games.

At the 2018 European Championships in Glasgow, Cunningham won gold in the floor exercise. He also won a silver as part of the team.

In his first World Championships at the 2018 World Championships in Doha, Qatar, Cunningham narrowly missed out on a bronze medal by 0.009 marks in the men's vault final.

=== 2019 ===
Cunningham sustained a leg injury at the 2019 European Championships in Poland, which left him on an 18-week rehabilitation programme to be able to walk again.

At the 2019 World Artistic Gymnastics Championships held in Stuttgart, Germany, Cunningham was part of the team that finished in fifth place in qualifications, qualifying the Great Britain team a place at the 2020 Summer Olympics. Cunningham and the team went on to retain their fifth place in the team final. Individually, Cunningham qualified to the floor exercise final where he placed eighth (13.566) and the vault final where he placed fifth (14.566).

=== 2020 ===
During the COVID-19 pandemic, Cunningham revealed he was struggling to train without use of gyms during UK lockdown periods. Describing the training situation for gymnasts as "impossible", he took to training at a stable in Walsall to prepare for the delayed 2020 Summer Olympics being held in Tokyo in 2021.

=== 2022 ===
In early 2022 Cunningham officially switched nationalities and began representing Ireland, his father's birth nation. Shortly thereafter, he was selected for his first Irish team at the 2022 European Men's Artistic Gymnastics Championships in Munich.

== See also ==
- Nationality changes in gymnastics
