= Edgar Boulet =

French artistic gymnast

- Born: 22 August 1995 (age 31) Bergerac, Dordogne, France

Gymnastics career
- Discipline: Men's artistic gymnastics
- Country represented: France
Medal record
Representing France
Men's artistic Gymnastics
European Championships
Bronze medal – third place	2018 Glasgow	Team
Mediterranean Games
Bronze medal – third place	2022 Oran	Team

Edgar Boulet (French: [ɛdɡaʁ bulɛ]; born 22 August 1995 in Bergerac) is a French artistic gymnast.

== Gymnastics career ==
Edgar Boulet won a bronze in the senior team event at the 2018 European Men's Artistic Gymnastics Championships.
