= Liam De Smet =

Belgian footballer (born 2004)

Personal information
- Date of birth: 12 April 2004 (age 22)
- Place of birth: Ename, Belgium
- Height: 1.75 m (5 ft 9 in)
- Position: Midfielder

Team information
- Current team: Kortrijk
- Number: 6

Youth career
- Club Brugge

Senior career*
Years	Team	Apps	(Gls)
2021–2025	Club NXT	84	(3)
2025–	Kortrijk	28	(0)

International career^{‡}
2019–2020	Belgium U16	6	(0)
- * Club domestic league appearances and goals as of 19 April 2026 ‡ National team caps and goals as of 11 March 2021

Liam De Smet (born 12 April 2004) is a Belgian professional footballer who plays as a midfielder for Kortrijk. He is the twin brother of teammate Lenn De Smet.

== Career statistics ==
=== Club ===
As of 11 March 2021.

Club	Season	League			Cup		Other		Total	
Club	Season	Division	Apps	Goals	Apps	Goals	Apps	Goals	Apps	Goals
Club NXT	2020–21	Proximus League	1	0	–		0	0	1	0
Career total			1	0	0	0	0	0	1	0
