= Robert Seligman =

Croatian artistic gymnast (born 1986)

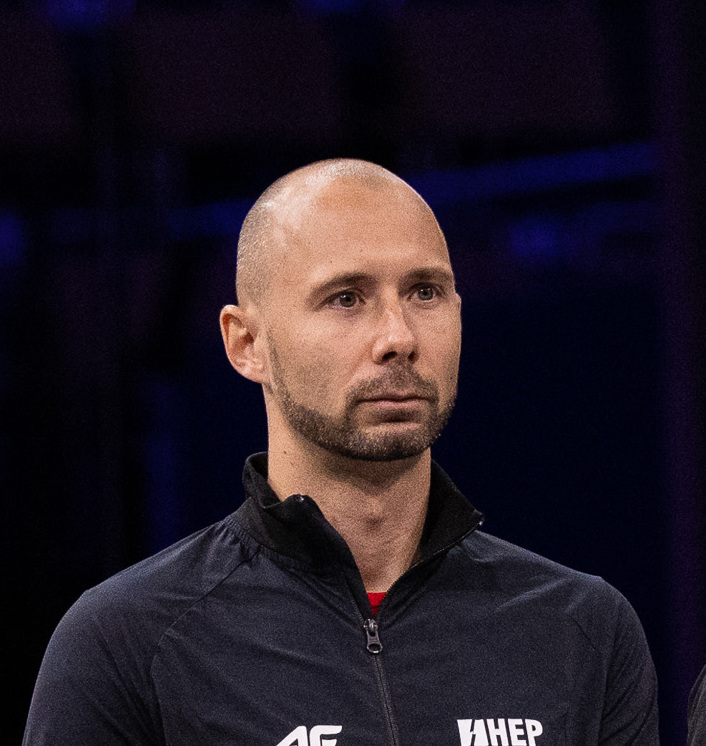
- Seligman at the 2022 European Men's Artistic Gymnastics Championships

Personal information
- Born: 1 May 1986 (age 40) Osijek, Croatia

Gymnastics career
- Discipline: Men's artistic gymnastics
- Country represented: Croatia
Medal record
Representing Croatia
European Championships
Silver medal – second place	2018 Glasgow	Pommel Horse
Bronze medal – third place	2008 Lausanne	Pommel Horse
Mediterranean Games
Silver medal – second place	2013 Mersin	Pommel Horse
Silver medal – second place	2018 Tarragona	Pommel Horse

Robert Seligman (born 1 May 1986) is a Croatian artistic gymnast.

He won the silver medal in the pommel horse event at the 2018 European Men's Artistic Gymnastics Championships held in Glasgow, Scotland, United Kingdom.

In 2020, he competed at the European Men's Artistic Gymnastics Championships held in Mersin, Turkey. He finished in 4th place in the vault event.
