= Gymnastics at the 2024 Summer Olympics – Men's artistic team all-around =

Men's artistic team all-around at the Games of the XXXIII Olympiad
- Venue: Accor Arena
- Date: 27 July 2024 (qualifying); 29 July 2024 (final)
- Competitors: 40 from 8 nations
- Winning total: 259.594

Medalists
1st place, gold medalist(s)		Daiki Hashimoto; Kazuma Kaya; Shinnosuke Oka; Takaaki Sugino; Wataru Tanigawa	Japan
2nd place, silver medalist(s)		Liu Yang; Su Weide; Xiao Ruoteng; Zhang Boheng; Zou Jingyuan	China
3rd place, bronze medalist(s)		Asher Hong; Paul Juda; Brody Malone; Stephen Nedoroscik; Fred Richard	United States

The men's artistic team all-around event at the 2024 Summer Olympics was held on 27 and 29 July 2024 at the Accor Arena (referred to as the Bercy Arena due to IOC sponsorship rules). There were 12 teams of 5 gymnasts each.

The medals for the competition were presented by Neven Ilic, Chile (IOC Member), accompanied by Morinari Watanabe, Japan (FIG President).

== Qualified teams ==
To reach the Olympics, a National Olympic Committee had to earn one of 12 team quota places. These were allocated through the 2022 World Artistic Gymnastics Championships (top three teams) and the 2023 World Artistic Gymnastics Championships (top nine teams, excluding those qualified in 2022). Those 12 teams competed in the qualification round in Paris on 27 July, with the top eight advancing to the final.

The following teams qualified for the Olympics by achieving a top three placement at the 2022 World Artistic Gymnastics Championships:

- China
- Japan
- Great Britain

The following teams qualified for the event by achieving a top nine placement among non-qualified teams at the 2023 World Artistic Gymnastics Championships:

- United States
- Canada
- Germany
- Italy
- Switzerland
- Spain
- Turkey
- Netherlands
- Ukraine

== Schedule ==
Date	Time	Round	Subdivision
27 July	11:00	Qualification	Subdivision 1
27 July	15:30	Qualification	Subdivision 2
27 July	20:00	Qualification	Subdivision 3
29 July	17:30	Final	–
All times are Central European Summer Time (UTC+2)

== Qualifications ==
The top eight teams in qualifications, based on combined scores of each apparatus, advanced to the final. In the final, each team selected three gymnasts to compete on each apparatus. All scores on each apparatus were summed to give a final team score. The scores in qualification did not carry over to the final.

Rank	Team	Floor (gymnastics)	Pommel horse	Rings (gymnastics)	Vault (gymnastics)	Parallel bars	Horizontal bar	Total
1	China	41.432	43.199	45.199	43.499	46.333	43.366	263.028
2	Japan	42.166	43.965	42.532	43.466	45.233	43.232	260.594
3	Great Britain	43.665	43.432	41.300	44.299	43.099	40.766	256.561
4	Ukraine	41.432	42.532	40.832	44.632	45.032	39.433	253.893
5	United States	41.899	42.433	42.366	43.166	43.266	40.099	253.229
6	Italy	41.933	40.799	40.400	43.533	42.300	40.799	249.764
7	Switzerland	41.566	41.732	39.532	43.099	43.600	40.133	249.662
8	Canada	41.466	38.999	41.699	42.365	42.699	40.566	247.794

== Final ==
Rank	Team	Floor (gymnastics)	Pommel horse	Rings (gymnastics)	Vault (gymnastics)	Parallel bars	Horizontal bar	Total
1st place, gold medalist(s)	Japan	43.266 (2)	42.332 (5)	42.633 (3)	43.433 (3)	44.365 (3)	43.565 (1)	259.594
1st place, gold medalist(s)	Daiki Hashimoto (JPN)	14.633	13.100		14.900		14.566	259.594
1st place, gold medalist(s)	Kazuma Kaya (JPN)	14.000	14.366	14.000		14.733		259.594
1st place, gold medalist(s)	Shinnosuke Oka (JPN)	14.633		14.133		14.866	14.433	259.594
1st place, gold medalist(s)	Takaaki Sugino (JPN)		14.866		14.700		14.566	259.594
1st place, gold medalist(s)	Wataru Tanigawa (JPN)			14.500	13.833	14.766		259.594
2nd place, silver medalist(s)	China	42.532 (4)	43.566 (1)	45.266 (1)	42.099 (7)	45.833 (1)	39.766 (7)	259.062
2nd place, silver medalist(s)	Liu Yang (CHN)			15.500				259.062
2nd place, silver medalist(s)	Su Weide (CHN)	14.333			12.766		11.600	259.062
2nd place, silver medalist(s)	Xiao Ruoteng (CHN)	13.966	14.333		14.800	14.733	13.433	259.062
2nd place, silver medalist(s)	Zhang Boheng (CHN)	14.233	14.433	14.833	14.533	15.100	14.733	259.062
2nd place, silver medalist(s)	Zou Jingyuan (CHN)		14.800	14.933		16.000		259.062
3rd place, bronze medalist(s)	United States	42.799 (3)	42.466 (4)	42.732 (2)	44.032 (2)	43.399 (4)	42.365 (2)	257.793
3rd place, bronze medalist(s)	Asher Hong (USA)	14.133		14.533	14.833	14.400		257.793
3rd place, bronze medalist(s)	Paul Juda (USA)	14.200	13.900		14.666		13.366	257.793
3rd place, bronze medalist(s)	Brody Malone (USA)		13.700	14.166	14.533	14.433	14.166	257.793
3rd place, bronze medalist(s)	Stephen Nedoroscik (USA)		14.866					257.793
3rd place, bronze medalist(s)	Fred Richard (USA)	14.466		14.033		14.566	14.833	257.793
4	Great Britain	44.166 (1)	43.332 (2)	41.832 (4)	43.265 (5)	42.899 (6)	40.033 (5)	255.527
4	Joe Fraser (GBR)		13.933	13.766		14.633	13.633	255.527
4	Harry Hepworth (GBR)	14.700		14.800	14.966			255.527
4	Jake Jarman (GBR)	14.966	14.133		15.266	14.366	13.400	255.527
4	Luke Whitehouse (GBR)	14.500		13.266	13.033			255.527
4	Max Whitlock (GBR)		15.266			13.900	13.000	255.527
5	Ukraine	41.232 (7)	42.866 (3)	40.899 (5)	44.466 (1)	44.799 (2)	40.499 (4)	254.761
5	Nazar Chepurnyi (UKR)	13.366			14.900			254.761
5	Illia Kovtun (UKR)	14.100	14.000	13.233		15.433	14.033	254.761
5	Igor Radivilov (UKR)			14.000	14.766			254.761
5	Radomyr Stelmakh (UKR)		14.033			14.366	13.666	254.761
5	Oleg Verniaiev (UKR)	13.766	14.833	13.666	14.800	15.000	12.800	254.761
6	Italy	41.899 (5)	40.352 (7)	40.832 (6)	43.266 (4)	42.099 (8)	39.632 (8)	248.260
6	Yumin Abbadini (ITA)	14.066	14.200	13.633			14.033	248.260
6	Nicola Bartolini (ITA)	14.133			14.500	13.700		248.260
6	Lorenzo Minh Casali (ITA)	13.700		13.633	14.466	14.066		248.260
6	Mario Macchiati (ITA)		13.566	13.566	14.300	14.333	12.833	248.260
6	Carlo Macchini (ITA)		12.766				12.766	248.260
7	Switzerland	41.866 (6)	40.799 (6)	40.233 (7)	41.632 (8)	42.999 (5)	39.898 (6)	247.427
7	Matteo Giubellini (SUI)		13.166	13.300		14.366	13.466	247.427
7	Luca Giubellini (SUI)	14.000	14.000		13.433			247.427
7	Florian Langenegger (SUI)	13.700		13.400	14.066			247.427
7	Noe Seifert (SUI)	13.966	13.633	13.533		14.400	12.866	247.427
7	Taha Serhani (SUI)				14.133	14.233	13.566	247.427
8	Canada	41.199 (8)	37.965 (8)	39.865 (8)	43.166 (6)	42.165 (7)	41.066 (3)	245.426
8	Zachary Clay (CAN)		14.133					245.426
8	René Cournoyer (CAN)		10.566	12.866	14.400	14.266	13.600	245.426
8	Félix Dolci (CAN)	13.966		13.633	14.300	13.566	13.966	245.426
8	William Émard (CAN)	13.833		13.366	14.466			245.426
8	Samuel Zakutney (CAN)	13.400	13.266			14.333	13.500	245.426
