= Gymnastics at the 2024 Summer Olympics – Men's artistic qualification =

Qualification for men's artistic gymnastics competitions at the 2024 Summer Olympics was held on 27 July 2024 at the Accor Arena (referred to as the Bercy Arena due to IOC sponsorship rules). The results of the qualification determined the qualifiers to the finals: 8 teams in the team final, 24 gymnasts in the individual all-around final, and 8 gymnasts in each of six apparatus finals. The competition was divided into three subdivisions.

== Subdivisions ==
Gymnasts from nations taking part in the team all-around event were grouped together while the remaining gymnasts were grouped into one of six mixed groups. The groups were divided into the three subdivisions after a draw held by the Fédération Internationale de Gymnastique. The groups rotated through each of the six apparatuses together.

	Floor (gymnastics)	Pommel horse	Rings (gymnastics)	Vault (gymnastics)	Parallel bars	Horizontal bar
Subdivision 1 (11:00)	Germany	United States	Mixed Group 5 Aurel Benović (CRO); Tin Srbić (CRO); Arthur Mariano (BRA); Diogo Soares (BRA); Artem Dolgopyat (ISR); Mahdi Olfati (IRI)	Great Britain	Mixed Group 4 Ahmad Abu Al-Soud (JOR); Robert Tvorogal (LTU); Krisztofer Mészáros (HUN); Audrys Nin Reyes (DOM); Eleftherios Petrounias (GRE); Andrei Muntean (ROU)	Canada
Subdivision 2 (15:30)	Mixed Group 1 Ángel Barajas (COL); Jesse Moore (AUS); Marios Georgiou (CYP); Samir Aït Saïd (FRA); Carlos Yulo (PHI); Shek Wai-hung (HKG)	Netherlands	China	Japan	Mixed Group 6 Milad Karimi (KAZ); Nariman Kurbanov (KAZ); Artur Davtyan (ARM); Vahagn Davtyan (ARM); Omar Mohamed (EGY); Lais Najjar (SYR)	Ukraine
Subdivision 3 (20:00)	Turkey	Switzerland	Italy	Mixed Group 3 Hur Woong (KOR); Lee Jun-ho (KOR); Ryu Sung-hyun (KOR); Kevin Penev (BUL); Rhys McClenaghan (IRL); Tang Chia-hung (TPE)	Mixed Group 2 Rasuljon Abdurakhimov (UZB); Abdulla Azimov (UZB); Khabibullo Ergashev (UZB); Glen Cuyle (BEL); Luka van den Keybus (BEL); Noah Kuavita (BEL)	Spain

== Results ==
Team/Gymnast	Floor (gymnastics)		Pommel horse		Rings (gymnastics)		Vault (gymnastics)		Parallel bars		Horizontal bar		Total (All-around)	
Team/Gymnast	Score	Rank	Score	Rank	Score	Rank	Score (Note: Gymnasts who wanted to qualify for the vault final performed a second vault, with the average of the two counting for event final qualification. Only the first vault counted for individual and team all-around qualification.)	Rank	Score	Rank	Score	Rank	Score	Rank
Teams
China	41.432	8	43.199	3	45.199	1	43.499	5	46.333	1	43.366	1	263.028	1
Liu Yang (CHN)	13.200	54	–	–	15.233	2	14.100	–	–	–	–	–	–	–
Su Weide (CHN)	13.300	49	6.666	64	–	–	12.966	–	–	–	14.400	7	–	–
Xiao Ruoteng (CHN)	13.666	35	14.266	16	13.600	28	14.733	–	14.800	12	13.833	17	84.898	4
Zhang Boheng (CHN)	14.466	6	14.333	14	14.666	9	14.666	–	15.333	2	15.133	1	88.597	1
Zou Jingyuan (CHN)	–	–	14.600	9	15.300	1	–	–	16.200	1	–	–	–	–
Japan	42.166	3	43.965	1	42.532	2	43.466	6	45.233	2	43.232	2	260.594	2
Daiki Hashimoto (JPN)	13.733	30	14.466	12	13.733	21	14.566	–	14.833	11	13.733	20	85.064	3
Kazuma Kaya (JPN)	14.100	15	14.266	17	14.066	16	–	–	14.933	9	13.966	16	–	–
Shinnosuke Oka (JPN)	14.333	9	14.466	11	14.000	17	14.233	–	15.300	3	14.533	5	86.865	2
Takaaki Sugino (JPN)	–	–	15.033	4	–	–	14.600	–	–	–	14.733	3	–	–
Wataru Tanigawa (JPN)	13.433	44	–	–	14.466	12	14.300/14.100; Avg: 14.200	12	15.000	8	–	–	–	–
Great Britain	43.665	1	43.432	2	41.300	6	44.299	2	43.099	6	40.766	4	256.561	3
Joe Fraser (GBR)	13.533	43	14.000	21	13.700	22	14.300	–	14.933	10	14.200	10	84.666	6
Harry Hepworth (GBR)	14.166	13	–	–	14.700	8	14.633/14.900; Avg: 14.766	2	–	–	–	–	–	–
Jake Jarman (GBR)	14.966	1	14.266	15	12.900	55	15.166/14.233; Avg: 14.699	5	14.266	29	13.333	35	84.897	5
Luke Whitehouse (GBR)	14.533	5	11.733	59	12.400	61	14.500	–	13.900	45	12.466	52	79.532	32
Max Whitlock (GBR)	–	–	15.166	3	–	–	–	–	13.900	44	13.233	39	–	–
Ukraine	41.432	8	42.532	4	40.832	8	44.632	1	45.032	3	39.433	12	253.893	4
Nazar Chepurnyi (UKR)	13.533	41	13.000	44	–	–	14.866/14.800; Avg: 14.833	1	14.100	36	13.033	42	–	–
Illia Kovtun (UKR)	14.533	4	13.466	34	13.066	43	14.166	–	15.166	6	12.766	48	84.666	11
Igor Radivilov (UKR)	–	–	–	–	14.166	15	14.900/14.500; Avg: 14.700	4	–	–	–	–	–	–
Radomyr Stelmakh (UKR)	13.366	46	14.033	20	12.933	54	–	–	14.600	15	13.600	24	–	–
Oleg Verniaiev (UKR)	13.066	57	15.033	5	13.600	24	14.866	–	15.266	4	12.800	45	84.666	7
United States	41.899	5	42.433	5	42.366	4	43.166	7	43.266	5	40.099	10	253.229	5
Asher Hong (USA)	14.100	17	–	–	14.633	10	14.700/14.433; Avg: 14.566	9	14.300	28	12.600	51	–	–
Paul Juda (USA)	13.966	23	13.600	31	13.400	35	14.533	–	14.033	38	13.333	36	82.865	13
Brody Malone (USA)	12.666	61	12.100	55	14.233	14	13.833	–	14.533	18	12.233	59	79.598	30
Stephen Nedoroscik (USA)	–	–	15.200	2	–	–	–	–	–	–	–	–	–	–
Fred Richard (USA)	13.833	26	13.633	29	13.500	31	13.933	–	14.433	23	14.166	11	83.498	10
Italy	41.933	4	40.799	8	40.400	9	43.533	4	42.300	11	40.799	3	249.764	6
Yumin Abbadini (ITA)	13.933	24	14.200	19	13.400	33	14.000	–	14.200	31	14.200	9	83.933	8
Nicola Bartolini (ITA)	14.000	19	–	–	–	–	14.600	–	14.100	35	–	–	–	–
Lorenzo Minh Casali (ITA)	14.000	20	11.700	60	13.600	26	14.433	–	14.000	39	13.433	30	81.166	25
Mario Macchiati (ITA)	13.566	39	13.833	23	13.400	33	14.500	–	13.766	49	13.166	40	82.231	16
Carlo Macchini (ITA)	–	–	12.766	49	–	–	–	–	–	–	11.666	65	–	–
Switzerland	41.566	6	41.732	6	39.532	12	43.099	8	43.600	4	40.133	9	249.662	7
Matteo Giubellini (SUI)	13.800	27	14.233	18	13.233	38	13.900	–	14.500	21	13.400	31	83.066	12
Luca Giubellini (SUI)	13.666	33	13.000	45	–	–	14.600	–	–	–	–	–	–	–
Florian Langenegger (SUI)	13.633	36	13.633	28	12.933	53	14.433	–	14.166	31	13.100	41	81.898	20
Noe Seifert (SUI)	14.100	15	13.866	22	13.366	36	14.066	–	14.600	17	11.800	63	81.798	21
Taha Serhani (SUI)	–	–	–	–	–	–	–	–	14.500	20	13.633	23	–	–
Canada	41.466	7	38.999	11	41.699	5	42.365	9	42.699	9	40.566	5	247.794	8
Zachary Clay (CAN)	–	–	13.733	26	–	–	–	–	12.900	60	–	–	–	–
René Cournoyer (CAN)	13.333	47	13.033	43	13.933	18	13.766	–	14.333	27	12.400	55	80.798	26
Félix Dolci (CAN)	14.133	14	11.133	63	13.366	37	14.333	–	14.400	24	14.133	13	81.498	22
William Émard (CAN)	14.000	20	–	–	14.400	13	14.266	–	–	–	11.066	67	–	–
Samuel Zakutney (CAN)	13.233	53	12.233	53	12.600	59	13.633	–	13.966	41	14.033	15	79.698	29
Turkey	40.366	11	38.332	12	42.465	3	44.032	3	42.832	7	39.532	11	247.559	9
Ferhat Arıcan (TUR)	–	–	13.800	25	–	–	–	–	15.033	7	–	–	–	–
Adem Asil (TUR)	13.833	25	–	–	14.866	5	15.266/13.700; Avg: 14.483	10	–	–	13.533	26	–	–
İbrahim Çolak (TUR)	–	–	–	–	14.533	11	–	–	13.500	53	12.266	56	–	–
Emre Dodanlı (TUR)	12.800	60	11.766	58	12.866	57	14.466	–	13.966	40	13.733	19	79.597	31
Ahmet Önder (TUR)	13.733	29	12.766	48	13.066	42	14.300	–	13.833	46	11.800	62	79.498	34
Netherlands	40.833	10	41.466	7	39.966	10	41.999	11	42.799	8	40.232	8	247.295	10
Loran de Munck (NED)	–	–	14.766	8	–	–	–	–	14.133	33	–	–	–	–
Martijn de Veer (NED)	13.333	47	–	–	13.200	39	14.266	–	–	–	13.466	29	–	–
Jermain Grünberg (NED)	13.533	40	11.800	57	13.000	46	13.833	–	13.000	58	11.766	64	76.932	43
Frank Rijken (NED)	13.600	37	13.400	35	12.933	52	13.300	–	14.600	16	13.400	31	81.233	23
Casimir Schmidt (NED)	13.700	32	13.300	37	13.766	20	13.900/14.400; Avg: 14.150	13	14.066	37	13.366	34	82.098	17
Germany	40.233	12	40.432	9	39.766	11	42.100	10	42.498	10	40.366	6	245.395	11
Pascal Brendel (GER)	13.600	38	12.233	54	13.000	48	13.900	–	13.133	56	13.466	27	79.332	36
Lukas Dauser (GER)	13.233	52	–	–	–	–	–	–	15.166	5	–	–	–	–
Nils Dunkel (GER)	12.600	62	14.566	10	13.700	22	13.600	–	13.966	41	12.800	47	81.232	24
Timo Eder (GER)	13.400	45	12.800	47	13.066	41	13.900	–	13.366	54	12.266	57	78.798	39
Andreas Toba (GER)	–	–	13.066	42	12.966	51	14.300	–	–	–	14.100	14	–	–
Spain	42.766	2	39.398	10	40.933	7	41.733	12	36.165	12	40.299	7	241.294	12
Néstor Abad (ESP)	14.000	18	13.166	39	13.600	27	14.500	–	10.766	64	13.300	38	79.332	35
Thierno Diallo (ESP)	–	–	11.866	56	–	–	–	–	12.966	59	12.933	43	–	–
Nicolau Mir (ESP)	13.666	33	12.666	50	12.966	50	12.733	–	7.466	65	13.333	37	72.830	44
Joel Plata (ESP)	14.166	11	13.566	33	13.433	32	12.933	–	12.433	62	13.666	22	80.197	27
Rayderley Zapata (ESP)	14.600	3	–	–	13.900	19	14.300/13.166; Avg: 13.733	17	–	–	–	–	–	–
Individuals
Carlos Yulo (PHI)	14.766	2	13.066	40	13.000	49	14.800/14.566; Avg: 14.683	6	14.533	19	13.466	27	83.631	9
Krisztofer Mészáros (HUN)	12.900	14	13.633	59	13.500	30	14.366	–	14.733	30	13.666	13	82.798	14
Jesse Moore (AUS)	13.966	22	13.700	27	13.033	44	14.233	–	14.200	30	13.566	25	82.698	15
Milad Karimi (KAZ)	14.433	8	13.266	38	13.000	47	14.300	–	14.366	25	12.700	50	82.065	18
Diogo Soares (BRA)	13.100	56	13.600	32	13.033	44	14.200	–	13.933	43	14.133	12	81.999	19
Abdulla Azimov (UZB)	12.966	58	14.400	13	12.166	62	13.866	–	13.766	48	12.800	45	79.964	28
Marios Georgiou (CYP)	13.266	50	13.400	35	12.900	56	13.966	–	11.600	63	14.366	8	79.498	33
Luka van den Keybus (BEL)	13.533	42	12.266	52	12.700	58	14.166	–	13.033	57	13.400	33	79.098	37
Lee Jun-ho (KOR)	13.700	31	11.200	62	13.600	24	14.533/14.233; Avg: 14.383	11	13.600	52	12.266	58	78.899	38
Omar Mohamed (EGY)	12.466	63	13.066	41	13.600	29	12.700/12.366; Avg: 12.533	18	14.133	34	12.700	49	78.665	40
Khabibullo Ergashev (UZB)	13.100	55	13.833	24	12.466	60	12.900	–	13.733	50	12.466	53	78.498	41
Kevin Penev (BUL)	14.166	12	11.633	61	13.166	40	14.000/14.000; Avg: 14.000	15	12.466	61	12.200	60	77.631	42
Lais Najjar (SYR)	13.266	51	–	–	–	–	–	–	13.833	47	12.400	54	–	–
Ángel Barajas (COL)	–	–	–	–	–	–	–	–	14.700	14	14.466	6	–	–
Aurel Benović (CRO)	13.766	28	–	–	–	–	14.566/14.900; Avg: 14.733	3	–	–	–	–	–	–
Artem Dolgopyat (ISR)	14.466	7	13.000	46	–	–	–	–	–	–	–	–	–	–
Robert Tvorogal (LTU)	–	–	–	–	–	–	–	–	13.166	55	13.833	18	–	–
Audrys Nin Reyes (DOM)	–	–	–	–	–	–	14.766/13.200; Avg: 13.983	16	–	–	11.400	66	–	–
Noah Kuavita (BEL)	–	–	–	–	–	–	–	–	13.700	51	11.866	61	–	–
Rhys McClenaghan (IRL)	–	–	15.200	1	–	–	–	–	–	–	–	–	–	–
Nariman Kurbanov (KAZ)	–	–	15.000	6	–	–	–	–	–	–	–	–	–	–
Samir Aït Saïd (FRA)	–	–	–	–	14.966	3	–	–	–	–	–	–	–	–
Tang Chia-hung (TPE)	–	–	–	–	–	–	–	–	–	–	14.933	2	–	–
Hur Woong (KOR)	–	–	14.900	7	–	–	–	–	–	–	–	–	–	–
Glen Cuyle (BEL)	–	–	–	–	14.900	4	–	–	–	–	–	–	–	–
Eleftherios Petrounias (GRE)	–	–	–	–	14.800	6	–	–	–	–	–	–	–	–
Vahagn Davtyan (ARM)	–	–	–	–	14.733	7	–	–	–	–	–	–	–	–
Mahdi Olfati (IRI)	–	–	–	–	–	–	14.666/14.500; Avg: 14.583	8	–	–	–	–	–	–
Tin Srbić (CRO)	–	–	–	–	–	–	–	–	–	–	14.600	4	–	–
Artur Davtyan (ARM)	–	–	–	–	–	–	14.533/14.800; Avg: 14.666	7	–	–	–	–	–	–
Rasuljon Abdurakhimov (UZB)	–	–	–	–	–	–	–	–	14.466	22	–	–	–	–
Andrei Muntean (ROU)	–	–	–	–	–	–	–	–	14.366	25	–	–	–	–
Ryu Sung-hyun (KOR)	14.266	10	–	–	–	–	–	–	–	–	–	–	–	–
Shek Wai Hung (HKG)	–	–	–	–	–	–	13.666/14.533; Avg: 14.099	14	–	–	–	–	–	–
Arthur Mariano (BRA)	–	–	–	–	–	–	–	–	–	–	12.900	44	–	–
Ahmad Abu Al-Soud (JOR)	–	–	12.466	51	–	–	–	–	–	–	–	–	–	–

=== Team ===
Rank	Team	Floor (gymnastics)	Pommel horse	Rings (gymnastics)	Vault (gymnastics)	Parallel bars	Horizontal bar	Total	Qual.
1	China	41.432 (8)	43.199 (3)	45.199 (1)	43.499 (5)	46.333 (1)	43.366 (1)	263.028	Q
1	Liu Yang (CHN)	13.200		15.233	14.100	–	–	263.028	Q
1	Su Weide (CHN)	13.300	6.666		12.966		14.400	263.028	Q
1	Xiao Ruoteng (CHN)	13.666	14.266	13.600	14.733	14.800	13.833	263.028	Q
1	Zhang Boheng (CHN)	14.466	14.333	14.666	14.666	15.333	15.133	263.028	Q
1	Zou Jingyuan (CHN)		14.600	15.300		16.200		263.028	Q
2	Japan	42.166 (3)	43.965 (1)	42.532 (2)	43.466 (6)	45.233 (2)	43.232 (2)	260.594	Q
2	Daiki Hashimoto (JPN)	13.733	14.466	13.733	14.566	14.833	13.733	260.594	Q
2	Kazuma Kaya (JPN)	14.100	14.266	14.066		14.933	13.966	260.594	Q
2	Shinnosuke Oka (JPN)	14.333	14.466	14.000	14.233	15.300	14.533	260.594	Q
2	Takaaki Sugino (JPN)		15.033		14.600		14.733	260.594	Q
2	Wataru Tanigawa (JPN)	13.433		14.466	14.300	15.000		260.594	Q
3	Great Britain	43.665 (1)	43.432 (2)	41.300 (6)	44.299 (2)	43.099 (6)	40.766 (4)	256.561	Q
3	Joe Fraser (GBR)	13.533	14.000	13.700	14.300	14.933	14.200	256.561	Q
3	Harry Hepworth (GBR)	14.166		14.700	14.633			256.561	Q
3	Jake Jarman (GBR)	14.966	14.266	12.900	15.166	14.266	13.333	256.561	Q
3	Luke Whitehouse (GBR)	14.533	11.733	12.400	14.500	13.900	12.466	256.561	Q
3	Max Whitlock (GBR)		15.166			13.900	13.233	256.561	Q
4	Ukraine	41.432 (8)	42.532 (4)	40.832 (8)	44.632 (1)	45.032 (3)	39.433 (12)	253.893	Q
4	Nazar Chepurnyi (UKR)	13.533	13.000		14.866	14.100	13.033	253.893	Q
4	Illia Kovtun (UKR)	14.533	13.466	13.066	14.166	15.166	12.766	253.893	Q
4	Igor Radivilov (UKR)			14.166	14.900			253.893	Q
4	Radomyr Stelmakh (UKR)	13.366	14.033	12.933		14.600	13.600	253.893	Q
4	Oleg Verniaiev (UKR)	13.066	15.033	13.600	14.866	15.266	12.800	253.893	Q
5	United States	41.899 (5)	42.433 (5)	42.366 (4)	43.166 (7)	43.266 (5)	40.099 (10)	253.229	Q
5	Asher Hong (USA)	14.100		14.633	14.700	14.300	12.600	253.229	Q
5	Paul Juda (USA)	13.966	13.600	13.400	14.533	14.033	13.333	253.229	Q
5	Brody Malone (USA)	12.666	12.100	14.233	13.833	14.533	12.233	253.229	Q
5	Stephen Nedoroscik (USA)		15.200					253.229	Q
5	Fred Richard (USA)	13.833	13.633	13.500	13.933	14.433	14.166	253.229	Q
6	Italy	41.933 (4)	40.799 (8)	40.400 (9)	43.533 (4)	42.300 (11)	40.799 (3)	249.764	Q
6	Yumin Abbadini (ITA)	13.933	14.200	13.400	14.000	14.200	14.200	249.764	Q
6	Nicola Bartolini (ITA)	14.000		–	14.600	14.100		249.764	Q
6	Lorenzo Minh Casali (ITA)	14.000	11.700	13.600	14.433	14.000	13.433	249.764	Q
6	Mario Macchiati (ITA)	13.566	13.833	13.400	14.500	13.766	13.166	249.764	Q
6	Carlo Macchini (ITA)		12.766				11.666	249.764	Q
7	Switzerland	41.566 (6)	41.732 (6)	39.532 (12)	43.099 (8)	43.600 (4)	40.133 (9)	249.662	Q
7	Matteo Giubellini (SUI)	13.800	14.233	13.233	13.900	14.500	13.400	249.662	Q
7	Luca Giubellini (SUI)	13.666	13.000	–	14.600			249.662	Q
7	Florian Langenegger (SUI)	13.633	13.633	12.933	14.433	14.166	13.100	249.662	Q
7	Noe Seifert (SUI)	14.100	13.866	13.366	14.066	14.600	11.800	249.662	Q
7	Taha Serhani (SUI)					14.500	13.633	249.662	Q
8	Canada	41.466 (7)	38.999 (11)	41.699 (5)	42.365 (9)	42.699 (9)	40.566 (5)	247.794	Q
8	Zachary Clay (CAN)		13.733			12.900		247.794	Q
8	René Cournoyer (CAN)	13.333	13.033	13.933	13.766	14.333	12.400	247.794	Q
8	Félix Dolci (CAN)	14.133	11.133	13.366	14.333	14.400	14.133	247.794	Q
8	William Émard (CAN)	14.000		14.400	14.266		11.066	247.794	Q
8	Samuel Zakutney (CAN)	13.233	12.233	12.600	13.633	13.966	14.033	247.794	Q
9	Turkey	40.366 (11)	38.332 (12)	42.465 (3)	44.032 (3)	42.832 (7)	39.532 (11)	247.559	R1
9	Ferhat Arıcan (TUR)		13.800		–	15.033		247.559	R1
9	Adem Asil (TUR)	13.833	–	14.866	15.266		13.533	247.559	R1
9	İbrahim Çolak (TUR)	–		14.533		13.500	12.266	247.559	R1
9	Emre Dodanlı (TUR)	12.800	11.766	12.866	14.466	13.966	13.733	247.559	R1
9	Ahmet Önder (TUR)	13.733	12.766	13.066	14.300	13.833	11.800	247.559	R1
10	Netherlands	40.833 (10)	41.466 (7)	39.966 (10)	41.999 (11)	42.799 (8)	40.232 (8)	247.295	R2
10	Loran de Munck (NED)		14.766			14.133		247.295	R2
10	Martijn de Veer (NED)	13.333		13.200	14.266		13.466	247.295	R2
10	Jermain Grünberg (NED)	13.533	11.800	13.000	13.833	13.000	11.766	247.295	R2
10	Frank Rijken (NED)	13.600	13.400	12.933	13.300	14.600	13.400	247.295	R2
10	Casimir Schmidt (NED)	13.700	13.300	13.766	13.900	14.066	13.366	247.295	R2

=== Individual all-around ===
Rank	Gymnast	Floor (gymnastics)	Pommel horse	Rings (gymnastics)	Vault (gymnastics)	Parallel bars	Horizontal bar	Total	Qual.
1	Zhang Boheng (CHN)	14.466	14.333	14.666	14.666	15.333	15.133	88.597	Q
2	Shinnosuke Oka (JPN)	14.333	14.466	14.000	14.233	15.300	14.533	86.865	Q
3	Daiki Hashimoto (JPN)	13.733	14.466	13.733	14.566	14.833	13.733	85.064	Q
4	Xiao Ruoteng (CHN)	13.666	14.266	13.600	14.733	14.800	13.833	84.898	Q
5	Jake Jarman (GBR)	14.966	14.266	12.900	15.166	14.266	13.333	84.897	Q
6	Joe Fraser (GBR)	13.533	14.000	13.700	14.300	14.933	14.200	84.666	Q
7	Oleg Verniaiev (UKR)	13.066	15.033	13.600	14.866	15.266	12.800	84.631	Q
8	Yumin Abbadini (ITA)	13.933	14.200	13.400	14.000	14.200	14.200	83.933	Q
9	Carlos Yulo (PHI)	14.766	13.066	13.000	14.800	14.533	13.466	83.631	Q
10	Fred Richard (USA)	13.833	13.633	13.500	13.933	14.433	14.166	83.498	Q
11	Illia Kovtun (UKR)	14.533	13.466	13.066	14.166	15.166	12.766	83.163	Q
12	Matteo Giubellini (SUI)	13.800	14.233	13.233	13.900	14.500	13.400	83.066	Q
13	Paul Juda (USA)	13.966	13.600	13.400	14.533	14.033	13.333	82.865	Q
14	Krisztofer Mészáros (HUN)	12.900	13.633	13.500	14.366	14.733	13.666	82.798	Q
15	Jesse Moore (AUS)	13.966	13.700	13.033	14.233	14.200	13.566	82.698	Q
16	Mario Macchiati (ITA)	13.566	13.833	13.400	14.500	13.766	13.166	82.231	Q
17	Casimir Schmidt (NED)	13.700	13.300	13.766	13.900	14.066	13.366	82.098	Q
18	Milad Karimi (KAZ)	14.433	13.266	13.000	14.300	14.366	12.700	82.065	Q
19	Diogo Soares (BRA)	13.100	13.600	13.033	14.200	13.933	14.133	81.999	Q
20	Florian Langenegger (SUI)	13.633	13.633	12.933	14.433	14.166	13.100	81.898	Q
21	Noe Seifert (SUI)	14.100	13.866	13.366	14.066	14.600	11.800	81.798	–
22	Félix Dolci (CAN)	14.133	11.133	13.366	14.333	14.400	14.133	81.498	Q
23	Frank Rijken (NED)	13.600	13.400	12.933	13.300	14.600	13.400	81.233	Q
24	Nils Dunkel (GER)	12.600	14.556	13.700	13.600	13.966	12.800	81.232	Q
25	Lorenzo Minh Casali (ITA)	14.000	11.700	13.600	14.433	14.000	13.433	81.166	–
26	René Cournoyer (CAN)	13.333	13.033	13.933	13.766	14.333	12.400	80.798	Q
27	Joel Plata (ESP)	14.166	13.566	13.433	12.933	12.433	13.666	80.197	R1
28	Abdulla Azimov (UZB)	12.966	14.400	12.166	13.866	13.766	12.800	79.964	R2
29	Samuel Zakutney (CAN)	13.233	12.233	12.600	13.633	13.966	14.033	79.698	–
30	Brody Malone (USA)	12.666	12.100	14.233	13.833	14.533	12.233	79.598	–
31	Emre Dodanlı (TUR)	12.800	11.766	12.866	14.466	13.966	13.733	79.597	R3
32	Luke Whitehouse (GBR)	14.533	11.733	12.400	14.500	13.900	12.466	79.532	–
33	Marios Georgiou (CYP)	13.266	13.400	12.900	13.966	11.600	14.366	79.498	R4

=== Floor ===
Rank	Gymnast	D Score	E Score	Pen.	Total	Qual.
1	Jake Jarman (GBR)	6.6	8.366		14.966	Q
2	Carlos Yulo (PHI)	6.3	8.466		14.766	Q
3	Rayderley Zapata (ESP)	6.3	8.300		14.600	Q
4	Illia Kovtun (UKR)	6.2	8.333		14.533	Q
5	Luke Whitehouse (GBR)	6.5	8.033		14.533	Q
6	Zhang Boheng (CHN)	6.1	8.366		14.466	Q
7	Artem Dolgopyat (ISR)	6.4	8.066		14.466	Q
8	Milad Karimi (KAZ)	6.3	8.133		14.433	Q
9	Shinnosuke Oka (JPN)	5.8	8.533		14.333	R1
10	Ryu Sung-hyun (KOR)	6.6	7.666		14.266	R2
11	Joel Plata (ESP)	5.7	8.466		14.166	R3

=== Pommel horse ===
Rank	Gymnast	D Score	E Score	Pen.	Total	Qual.
1	Rhys McClenaghan (IRL)	6.3	8.900		15.200	Q
2	Stephen Nedoroscik (USA)	6.4	8.800		15.200	Q
3	Max Whitlock (GBR)	6.6	8.566		15.166	Q
4	Takaaki Sugino (JPN)	6.5	8.533		15.033	Q
5	Oleg Verniaiev (UKR)	6.6	8.433		15.033	Q
6	Nariman Kurbanov (KAZ)	6.4	8.600		15.000	Q
7	Hur Woong (KOR)	6.7	8.200		14.900	Q
8	Loran de Munck (NED)	6.4	8.366		14.766	Q
9	Zou Jingyuan (CHN)	5.9	8.700		14.600	R1
10	Nils Dunkel (GER)	6.4	8.166		14.566	R2
11	Shinnosuke Oka (JPN)	5.9	8.566		14.466	R3

=== Rings ===
Rank	Gymnast	D Score	E Score	Pen.	Total	Qual.
1	Zou Jingyuan (CHN)	6.4	8.900		15.300	Q
2	Liu Yang (CHN)	6.4	8.833		15.233	Q
3	Samir Aït Saïd (FRA)	6.1	8.866		14.966	Q
4	Glen Cuyle (BEL)	6.3	8.600		14.900	Q
5	Adem Asil (TUR)	6.4	8.466		14.866	Q
6	Eleftherios Petrounias (GRE)	6.3	8.500		14.800	Q
7	Vahagn Davtyan (ARM)	6.0	8.733		14.733	Q
8	Harry Hepworth (GBR)	6.1	8.600		14.700	Q
9	Zhang Boheng (CHN)	6.0	8.666		14.666	–
10	Asher Hong (USA)	6.0	8.633		14.633	R1
11	İbrahim Çolak (TUR)	5.9	8.633		14.533	R2
12	Wataru Tanigawa (JPN)	6.0	8.466		14.466	R3

=== Vault ===
Rank	Gymnast	Vault 1				Vault 2				Total	Qual.
Rank	Gymnast	D Score	E Score	Pen.	Score 1	D Score	E Score	Pen.	Score 2	Total	Qual.
1	Nazar Chepurnyi (UKR)	5.6	9.266		14.866	5.6	9.200		14.800	14.833	Q
2	Harry Hepworth (GBR)	5.6	9.033		14.633	5.6	9.300		14.900	14.766	Q
3	Aurel Benović (CRO)	5.6	8.966		14.566	5.6	9.300		14.900	14.733	Q
4	Igor Radivilov (UKR)	5.6	9.300		14.900	5.6	8.900		14.500	14.700	Q
5	Jake Jarman (GBR)	6.0	9.266	0.100	15.166	5.6	8.633		14.233	14.699	Q
6	Carlos Yulo (PHI)	5.6	9.300	0.100	14.800	5.6	8.966		14.566	14.683	Q
7	Artur Davtyan (ARM)	5.6	9.033	0.100	14.533	5.6	9.200		14.800	14.666	Q
8	Mahdi Olfati (IRI)	5.6	9.066		14.666	5.6	8.900		14.500	14.583	Q
9	Asher Hong (USA)	6.0	8.800	0.100	14.700	5.6	8.933	0.100	14.433	14.566	R1
10	Adem Asil (TUR)	6.0	9.266		15.266	5.6	8.100		13.700	14.483	R2
11	Lee Jun-ho (KOR)	5.6	8.933		14.533	5.6	8.933	0.300	14.233	14.383	R3

=== Parallel bars ===
Rank	Gymnast	D Score	E Score	Pen.	Total	Qual.
1	Zou Jingyuan (CHN)	6.9	9.300		16.200	Q
2	Zhang Boheng (CHN)	6.4	8.933		15.333	Q
3	Shinnosuke Oka (JPN)	6.5	8.800		15.300	Q
4	Oleg Verniaiev (UKR)	6.6	8.666		15.266	Q
5	Lukas Dauser (GER)	6.6	8.566		15.166	Q
6	Illia Kovtun (UKR)	6.7	8.466		15.166	Q
7	Ferhat Arıcan (TUR)	6.9	8.133		15.033	Q
8	Tanigawa Wataru (JPN)	6.3	8.700		15.000	Q
9	Kaya Kazuma (JPN)	6.3	8.633		14.933	–
10	Joe Fraser (GBR)	6.5	8.433		14.933	R1
11	Daiki Hashimoto (JPN)	6.1	8.733		14.833	–
12	Xiao Ruoteng (CHN)	6.0	8.800		14.800	–
13	Krisztofer Mészáros (HUN)	6.4	8.333		14.733	R2
14	Ángel Barajas (COL)	6.7	8.000		14.700	R3

=== Horizontal bar ===
Rank	Gymnast	D Score	E Score	Pen.	Total	Qual.
1	Zhang Boheng (CHN)	6.5	8.633		15.133	Q
2	Tang Chia-hung (TPE)	6.3	8.633		14.933	Q
3	Takaaki Sugino (JPN)	6.6	8.133		14.733	Q
4	Tin Srbić (CRO)	6.3	8.300		14.600	Q
5	Shinnosuke Oka (JPN)	5.9	8.633		14.533	Q
6	Ángel Barajas (COL)	6.7	7.766		14.466	Q
7	Su Weide (CHN)	6.0	8.400		14.400	Q
8	Marios Georgiou (CYP)	5.9	8.466		14.366	Q
9	Yumin Abbadini (ITA)	5.9	8.300		14.200	R1
10	Joe Fraser (GBR)	6.4	7.800		14.200	R2
11	Fred Richard (USA)	5.8	8.366		14.166	R3
