= Gymnastics at the 2024 Summer Olympics – Men's artistic individual all-around =

Men's artistic individual all-around at the Games of the XXXIII Olympiad
- Olympic artistic gymnastics
- Venue: Accor Arena
- Date: 27 July 2024 (qualifying); 31 July 2024 (final)
- Competitors: 24 from 15 nations
- Winning total: 86.832

Medalists
1st place, gold medalist(s)		Shinnosuke Oka	Japan
2nd place, silver medalist(s)		Zhang Boheng	China
3rd place, bronze medalist(s)		Xiao Ruoteng	China

The men's artistic individual all-around event at the 2024 Summer Olympics was scheduled to take place on 27 and 31 July 2024 at the Accor Arena (referred to as the Bercy Arena due to IOC sponsorship rules). 44 gymnasts from 23 nations (of the 96 total gymnasts) competed in the all-around in the qualifying round.

== Background ==
This was the 29th appearance of the men's individual all-around. The first individual all-around competition had been held in 1900, after the 1896 competitions featured only individual apparatus events. A men's individual all-around has been held every Games since 1900.

== Qualification ==
A National Olympic Committee (NOC) could enter up to 5 qualified gymnasts. A total of 96 quota places are allocated to men's artistic gymnastics.

The 12 teams that qualified were able to send 5 gymnasts in the team competition, for a total of 60 of the 96 quota places. The top three teams at the 2022 World Artistic Gymnastics Championships (China, Japan, and Great Britain) and the top nine teams (excluding those already qualified) at the 2023 World Artistic Gymnastics Championships (the United States, Canada, Germany, Italy, Switzerland, Spain, Turkey, the Netherlands, and Ukraine) earned team qualification places.

The remaining 36 quota places are awarded individually. Each gymnast can only earn one place. These places are filled through various criteria based on the 2023 World Championships, the 2024 FIG Artistic Gymnastics World Cup series, continental championships, a host guarantee, a reallocation guarantee and a Tripartite Commission invitation.

Only gymnasts competing in all six apparatus exercises in the qualifying round were ranked for the individual all-around qualifying.

== Competition format ==
The top 24 qualifiers in the qualification phase (limit two per NOC) advanced to the all-around final. The finalists performed an additional exercise on each apparatus. Qualification scores were then ignored, with only final round scores counting. Scoring was according to the FIG Code of Points.

== Schedule ==
Date	Time	Round	Subdivision
27 July	11:00	Qualification	Subdivision 1
27 July	15:30	Qualification	Subdivision 2
27 July	20:00	Qualification	Subdivision 3
31 July	17:30	Final	–
All times are Central European Summer Time (UTC+2)

== Results ==
=== Qualifying ===
The gymnasts who ranked in the top twenty-four qualified for the final round. In a case where more than two gymnasts from the same NOC were in the top twenty-four, the last ranked among them would not qualify to final round. The next-best ranked gymnast would qualify instead.

Rank	Gymnast	Floor (gymnastics)	Pommel horse	Rings (gymnastics)	Vault (gymnastics)	Parallel bars	Horizontal bar	Total	Qual.
1	Zhang Boheng (CHN)	14.466	14.333	14.666	14.666	15.333	15.133	88.597	Q
2	Shinnosuke Oka (JPN)	14.333	14.466	14.000	14.233	15.300	14.533	86.865	Q
3	Daiki Hashimoto (JPN)	13.733	14.466	13.733	14.566	14.833	13.733	85.064	Q
4	Xiao Ruoteng (CHN)	13.666	14.266	13.600	14.733	14.800	13.833	84.898	Q
5	Jake Jarman (GBR)	14.966	14.266	12.900	15.166	14.266	13.333	84.897	Q
6	Joe Fraser (GBR)	13.533	14.000	13.700	14.300	14.933	14.200	84.666	Q
7	Oleg Verniaiev (UKR)	13.066	15.033	13.600	14.866	15.266	12.800	84.631	Q
8	Yumin Abbadini (ITA)	13.933	14.200	13.400	14.000	14.200	14.200	83.933	Q
9	Carlos Yulo (PHI)	14.766	13.066	13.000	14.800	14.533	13.466	83.631	Q
10	Fred Richard (USA)	13.833	13.633	13.500	13.933	14.433	14.166	83.498	Q
11	Illia Kovtun (UKR)	14.533	13.466	13.066	14.166	15.166	12.766	83.163	Q
12	Matteo Giubellini (SUI)	13.800	14.233	13.233	13.900	14.500	13.400	83.066	Q
13	Paul Juda (USA)	13.966	13.600	13.400	14.533	14.033	13.333	82.865	Q
14	Krisztofer Mészáros (HUN)	12.900	13.633	13.500	14.366	14.733	13.666	82.798	Q
15	Jesse Moore (AUS)	13.966	13.700	13.033	14.233	14.200	13.566	82.698	Q
16	Mario Macchiati (ITA)	13.566	13.833	13.400	14.500	13.766	13.166	82.231	Q
17	Casimir Schmidt (NED)	13.700	13.300	13.766	13.900	14.066	13.366	82.098	Q
18	Milad Karimi (KAZ)	14.433	13.266	13.000	14.300	14.366	12.700	82.065	Q
19	Diogo Soares (BRA)	13.100	13.600	13.033	14.200	13.933	14.133	81.999	Q
20	Florian Langenegger (SUI)	13.633	13.633	12.933	14.433	14.166	13.100	81.898	Q
21	Noe Seifert (SUI)	14.100	13.866	13.366	14.066	14.600	11.800	81.798	–
22	Félix Dolci (CAN)	14.133	11.133	13.366	14.333	14.400	14.133	81.498	Q
23	Frank Rijken (NED)	13.600	13.400	12.933	13.300	14.600	13.400	81.233	Q
24	Nils Dunkel (GER)	12.600	14.556	13.700	13.600	13.966	12.800	81.232	Q
25	Lorenzo Minh Casali (ITA)	14.000	11.700	13.600	14.433	14.000	13.433	81.166	–
26	René Cournoyer (CAN)	13.333	13.033	13.933	13.766	14.333	12.400	80.798	Q
27	Joel Plata (ESP)	14.166	13.566	13.433	12.933	12.433	13.666	80.197	R1
28	Abdulla Azimov (UZB)	12.966	14.400	12.166	13.866	13.766	12.800	79.964	R2
29	Samuel Zakutney (CAN)	13.233	12.233	12.600	13.633	13.966	14.033	79.698	–
30	Brody Malone (USA)	12.666	12.100	14.233	13.833	14.533	12.233	79.598	–
31	Emre Dodanlı (TUR)	12.800	11.766	12.866	14.466	13.966	13.733	79.597	R3
32	Luke Whitehouse (GBR)	14.533	11.733	12.400	14.500	13.900	12.466	79.532	–
33	Marios Georgiou (CYP)	13.266	13.400	12.900	13.966	11.600	14.366	79.498	R4

Reserves

The reserves for the individual all-around event final were:

1. Joel Plata (ESP)
2. Abdulla Azimov (UZB)
3. Emre Dodanlı (TUR)
4. Marios Georgiou (CYP)

Only two gymnasts from each country may advance to the all-around final. Gymnasts who did not qualify for the final because of the quota, but had high enough scores to do so were:

- Noe Seifert (SUI)
- Lorenzo Minh Casali (ITA)

=== Final ===
Rank	Gymnast	Floor (gymnastics)	Pommel horse	Rings (gymnastics)	Vault (gymnastics)	Parallel bars	Horizontal bar	Total
1st place, gold medalist(s)	Shinnosuke Oka (JPN)	14.566	14.500	13.866	14.300	15.100	14.500	86.832
2nd place, silver medalist(s)	Zhang Boheng (CHN)	13.233	14.333	14.600	14.500	15.300	14.633	86.599
3rd place, bronze medalist(s)	Xiao Ruoteng (CHN)	14.333	14.266	13.800	14.833	14.766	14.366	86.364
4	Illia Kovtun (UKR)	14.700	14.633	13.333	14.266	15.400	13.833	86.165
5	Joe Fraser (GBR)	14.300	13.700	14.000	14.333	14.933	14.266	85.532
6	Daiki Hashimoto (JPN)	14.633	12.966	13.400	14.766	14.433	14.400	84.598
7	Jake Jarman (GBR)	14.900	14.066	12.800	15.166	14.300	13.333	84.565
8	Oleg Verniaiev (UKR)	13.933	14.833	13.533	14.400	15.000	12.700	84.399
9	Krisztofer Mészáros (HUN)	13.933	14.100	13.400	14.400	14.300	13.766	83.899
10	Matteo Giubellini (SUI)	14.100	14.533	13.300	13.800	14.033	13.566	83.332
11	Yumin Abbadini (ITA)	13.900	14.166	13.333	14.033	13.966	13.800	83.198
12	Carlos Yulo (PHI)	14.333	11.900	13.933	14.766	14.500	13.600	83.032
13	Casimir Schmidt (NED)	13.666	13.900	13.833	14.400	13.633	13.066	82.498
14	Paul Juda (USA)	13.533	13.866	13.433	13.733	13.866	13.766	82.197
15	Fred Richard (USA)	13.200	12.733	13.600	14.100	14.133	14.400	82.166
16	Florian Langenegger (SUI)	14.066	13.566	13.366	14.133	13.700	13.033	81.864
17	René Cournoyer (CAN)	13.600	13.100	13.700	13.733	14.300	13.300	81.733
18	Nils Dunkel (GER)	13.333	14.466	13.566	13.700	13.466	13.166	81.697
19	Mario Macchiati (ITA)	13.666	13.966	13.300	14.166	13.233	13.166	81.497
20	Félix Dolci (CAN)	14.366	12.533	13.766	14.366	14.333	11.733	81.097
21	Jesse Moore (AUS)	12.533	14.466	12.866	14.333	13.866	12.366	80.430
22	Frank Rijken (NED)	13.433	12.733	12.733	13.733	14.266	13.400	80.298
23	Diogo Soares (BRA)	13.133	11.566	12.033	14.500	13.733	13.733	78.698
24	Milad Karimi (KAZ)	13.433	8.533	12.933	14.400	14.066	12.700	76.065
