= Giubellini =

Giubellini is a Swiss surname. Notable people with the surname include:

- Daniel Giubellini (born 1969), Swiss gymnast
- Luca Giubellini (born 2003), Swiss artistic gymnast
- Matteo Giubellini (born 2004), Swiss artistic gymnast
