= 2026 Swiss Cup Zürich =

Artistic gymnastics competition

- The competition floor at the Hallenstadion
- Location: Zürich, Switzerland
- Date: November 7, 2026

Medalists
gold medal	Lorette Charpy; Alizée Letrange; Anthony Mansard; Léo Saladino	France
silver medal	Charleen Pach; Karina Schönmaier; Timo Eder; Milan Hosseini	Germany
bronze medal	Lena Bickel; Anastassia Pascu; Florian Langenegger; Noe Seifert	Switzerland

The 2026 Swiss Cup Zürich was an artistic gymnastics competition that took place on November 7 at the Hallenstadion in Zürich, Switzerland.

== Participants ==
The competition consisted of five teams with two male and two female competitors each.

Team	WAG	MAG
China	Qin Xinyi; Tian Zhuofan	Xie Chenyi; Zhang Yangyu
France	Lorette Charpy; Alizée Letrange	Anthony Mansard; Léo Saladino
Germany	Charleen Pach; Karina Schönmaier	Timo Eder; Milan Hosseini
Switzerland	Lena Bickel; Anastassia Pascu	Florian Langenegger; Noe Seifert
United States	Tatum Drusch; Lila Richardson	Joshua Karnes; Yul Moldauer

== Results ==
=== Preliminary Round ===
During the preliminary round, each nation could select one score to count twice toward their team total.

Rank	Name	Round 1	Round 2	Round 3	Total
1	Switzerland				91.150
1	Lena Bickel		12.850		12.850
1	Anastassia Pascu	12.100		10.900	23.000
1	Florian Langenegger		13.800 (Note: Score was doubled for team total)	13.950	41.550
1	Noe Seifert	13.750			13.750
2	France				89.800
2	Lorette Charpy		13.750		13.750
2	Alizée Letrange	11.450		11.250	22.700
2	Anthony Mansard		13.700		27.400
2	Léo Saladino	12.600		13.350	25.950
3	Germany				87.900
3	Charleen Pach	12.250		10.900	23.150
3	Karina Schönmaier		12.950		12.950
3	Timo Eder		12.950		25.900
3	Milan Hosseini	12.750		13.150	25.900
4	United States				87.750
4	Tatum Drusch	6.750		12.050	18.800
4	Lila Richardson		12.500		12.500
4	Joshua Karnes		13.950		13.950
4	Yul Moldauer	14.500		13.500	42.500
5	China				85.250
5	Qin Xinyi	11.350		11.600	22.950
5	Tian Zhuofan		13.800		13.800
5	Xie Chenyi	12.100			12.100
5	Zhang Yangyu		13.200	11.600	36.400

the team advanced to the semifinal

=== Elimination Rounds ===
The bottom four teams from preliminaries competed in the elimination round, while the first-place team automatically progressed to the semifinal.

Rank	Name	Scores	Total
FRA vs CHN
1	France		27.450
1	Lorette Charpy	13.500	27.450
1	Anthony Mansard	13.950	27.450
2	China		24.850
2	Tian Zhuofan	12.200	24.850
2	Zhang Yangyu	12.650	24.850
GER vs USA
1	Germany		27.375
1	Karina Schönmaier	13.775	27.375
1	Timo Eder	13.600	27.375
2	United States		26.600
2	Lila Richardson	12.950	26.600
2	Joshua Karnes	13.650	26.600

the team advanced to the semifinal

=== Semifinal ===
The top two teams from the semifinal advanced to the gold-medal round.

Rank	Name	Scores	Total
1	France		27.200
1	Alizée Letrange	13.200	27.200
1	Léo Saladino	14.000	27.200
2	Germany		27.100
2	Karina Schönmaier	13.450	27.100
2	Timo Eder	13.650	27.100
3rd place, bronze medalist(s)	Switzerland		27.050
3rd place, bronze medalist(s)	Anastassia Pascu	13.050	27.050
3rd place, bronze medalist(s)	Florian Langenegger	14.000	27.050

the team advanced to the final

=== Final ===
The competitors at the 2026 Swiss Cup, with Team France on the podium

Rank	Name	Scores	Total
1st place, gold medalist(s)	France		53.050
1st place, gold medalist(s)	Lorette Charpy	13.250	53.050
1st place, gold medalist(s)	Alizée Letrange	12.950	53.050
1st place, gold medalist(s)	Anthony Mansard	12.900	53.050
1st place, gold medalist(s)	Léo Saladino	13.950	53.050
2nd place, silver medalist(s)	Germany		52.750
2nd place, silver medalist(s)	Charleen Pach	12.900	52.750
2nd place, silver medalist(s)	Karina Schönmaier	13.800	52.750
2nd place, silver medalist(s)	Timo Eder	13.600	52.750
2nd place, silver medalist(s)	Milan Hosseini	12.450	52.750
