= Noe Seifert =

Swiss artistic gymnast

- Noe Seifert at the 2026 Swiss Cup

Personal information
- Full name: Noe Samuel Seifert
- Born: 29 October 1998 (age 28) Zofingen, Switzerland

Gymnastics career
- Discipline: Men's artistic gymnastics
- Country represented: Switzerland; (2016–present)
- Club: Satus ORO
- Head coaches: Claudio Capelli, Sébastien Darrigade
Medal record
Men's artistic gymnastics
Representing Switzerland
World Championships
Bronze medal – third place	2025 Jakarta	All-around
European Championships
Silver medal – second place	2025 Leipzig	Team
Bronze medal – third place	2024 Rimini	Parallel bars
Bronze medal – third place	2026 Zagreb	Team
FIG World Cup
Event	1st	2nd	3rd
Apparatus World Cup	0	1	1
World Challenge Cup	0	1	1
Total	0	2	2

Noe Samuel Seifert OLY (born October 29, 1998) is a Swiss artistic gymnast. He is the 2024 European bronze medalist on parallel bars and won silver with the Swiss team at the 2025 European Championship. He represented Switzerland at the 2024 Olympic Games. At the 2025 World Artistic Gymnastics Championships he won the bronze medal in the all-around final and became the first Swiss man to claim a medal in this event in 75 years.

== Early life ==
Seifert was born in Zofingen on October 29, 1998 and grew up in Oftringen. He began gymnastics when he was five years old.

== Gymnastics career ==
Seifert won a bronze medal with the Swiss team at the 2016 Junior European Championships. He finished 12th in the all-around at the 2017 Voronin Cup.

=== 2018–19 ===
Seifert competed with the Swiss team that won the silver medal behind Spain at the 2018 Austrian Team Open. Then at the European Championships, the Swiss team qualified for the team final, finishing fifth. He finished fourth in the all-around at the Swiss Championships.

Seifert won a silver medal with the Swiss team at the 2019 Magglingen Friendly. He then finished eighth in the all-around at the Swiss Championships. He won a gold medal with the Aargau team at the 2019 Swiss Team Championships.

=== 2020–21 ===
Seifert competed on the pommel horse and parallel bars at the 2021 European Championships but did not advance to any finals. At the 2021 Swiss Championships, he won the gold medal on parallel bars, the silver medal on pommel horse, and the bronze medal on still rings. He was not selected to compete on Switzerland's Olympic team. He finished sixth on the parallel bars at the 2021 Koper World Challenge Cup. He then finished sixth on the pommel horse at the Mersin World Challenge Cup. He competed on the pommel horse and the parallel bars at the World Championships but did not advance to the finals. He then competed at the Swiss Cup, a mixed pairs competition, alongside Lena Bickel, and they finished fourth.

=== 2022 ===
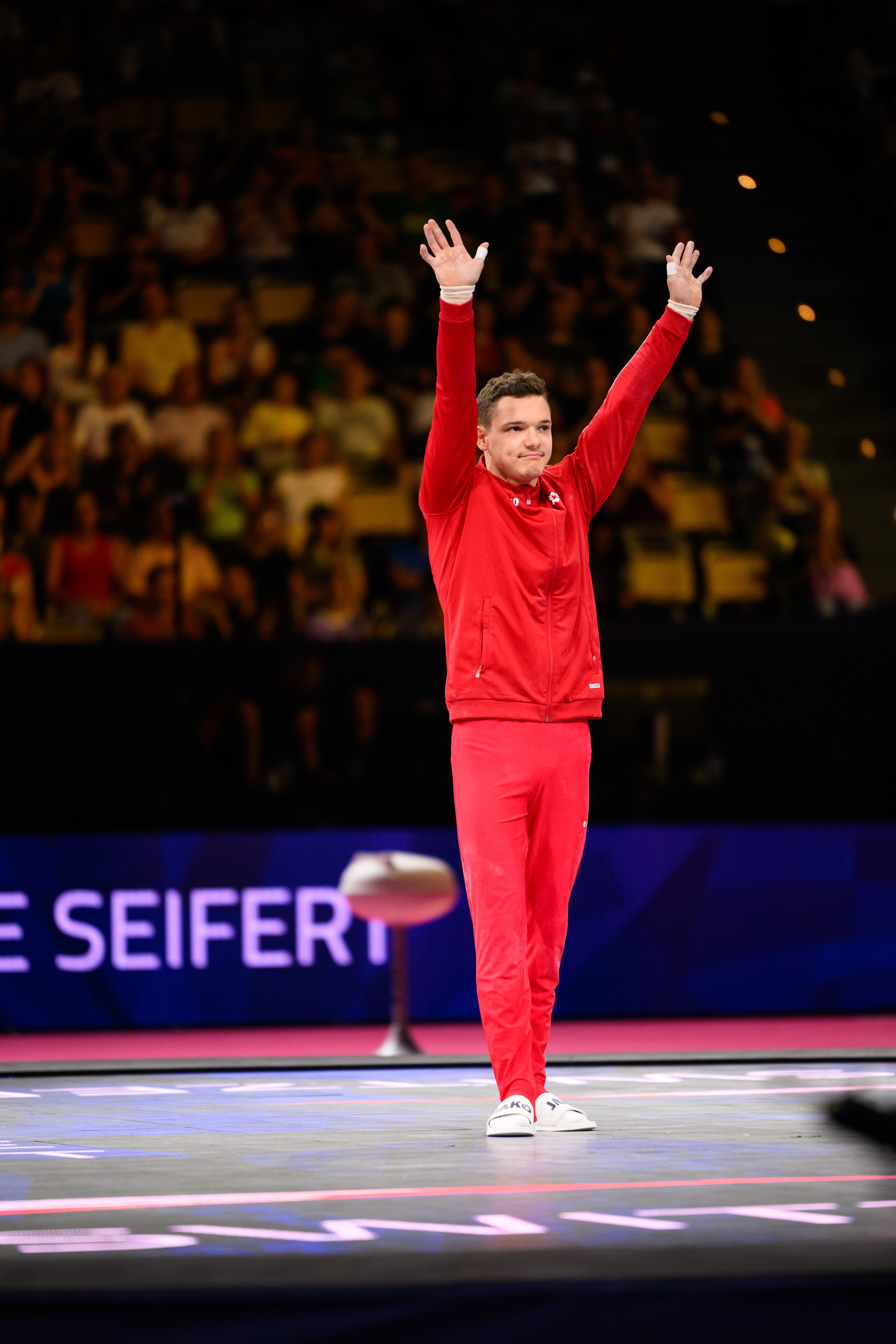
Seifert at the 2022 European Championships

Seifert won a silver medal on the parallel bars at the Osijek World Challenge Cup behind Turkey's Ferhat Arıcan. He then won the all-around title at the Swiss Championships and the event titles on the rings and parallel bars. He helped the Swiss team win the gold medal at the Magglingen Friendly. He then competed at the European Championships, helping the Swiss team finish fourth. Individually, Seifert finished fifth in the all-around competition, and he also finished fifth in the horizontal bar final. He also finished fifth in the all-around at the Joaquim Blume Memorial. Due to several mistakes at the World Championships, the Swiss team only finished 20th, and Seifert missed out on the all-around final. He competed at the Swiss Cup with Lena Bickel for the second consecutive year, and they placed ninth.

=== 2023 ===
Seifert competed at the DTB Pokal Team Challenge where the Swiss team finished fifth. He then competed at the European Championships where the Swiss team finished fourth. He repeated his fifth-place all-around finish from the previous European Championships, this time less than half of a point away from the bronze medal. He also finished eighth in the floor exercise final and seventh in the parallel bars final. Then at the Lenzburg Friendly, he helped the Swiss team finish second to Spain, and he won the all-around silver medal behind Néstor Abad. He successfully defended his Swiss national all-around title. He also won the all-around gold medal at the Magglingen Friendly and helped the Swiss team win.

Seifert was selected to compete at the 2023 World Championships. There, the Swiss team finished seventh during the qualification round and earned a team berth for the 2024 Olympic Games. Then in the team final, the Swiss team placed fifth which was the country's best finished at the World Artistic Gymnastics Championships since winning bronze in 1954. Individually, he qualified for the all-around final where he finished eighth– the best World all-around result for a Swiss male gymnat since 1950. The Swiss team was presented with the Infinity Award by Fujitsu for their historic achievements. He withdrew from the Swiss Cup and the Arthur Gander Memorial due to ongoing back issues.

=== 2024 ===
In early April, Seifert competed at the Osijek World Challenge Cup where he won bronze on the parallel bars behind Lukas Dauser and Illia Kovtun. Later that month, he competed the 2024 European Championships and won bronze on parallel bars behind Kovtun and Marios Georgiou. He also finished fourth on the horizontal bar and eighth with the Swiss team. In June, he won his third consecutive Swiss all-around title. Seifert was named to the team to compete at the 2024 Olympic Games alongside Luca Giubellini, Matteo Giubellini, Florian Langenegger, and Taha Serhani. During the qualification round, the Swiss team qualified for the team final, and Seifert finished 21st in the all-around. However, Seifert did not qualify for the all-around final because of the two-per-country rule. The Swiss team finished seventh in the team final.

=== 2025 ===
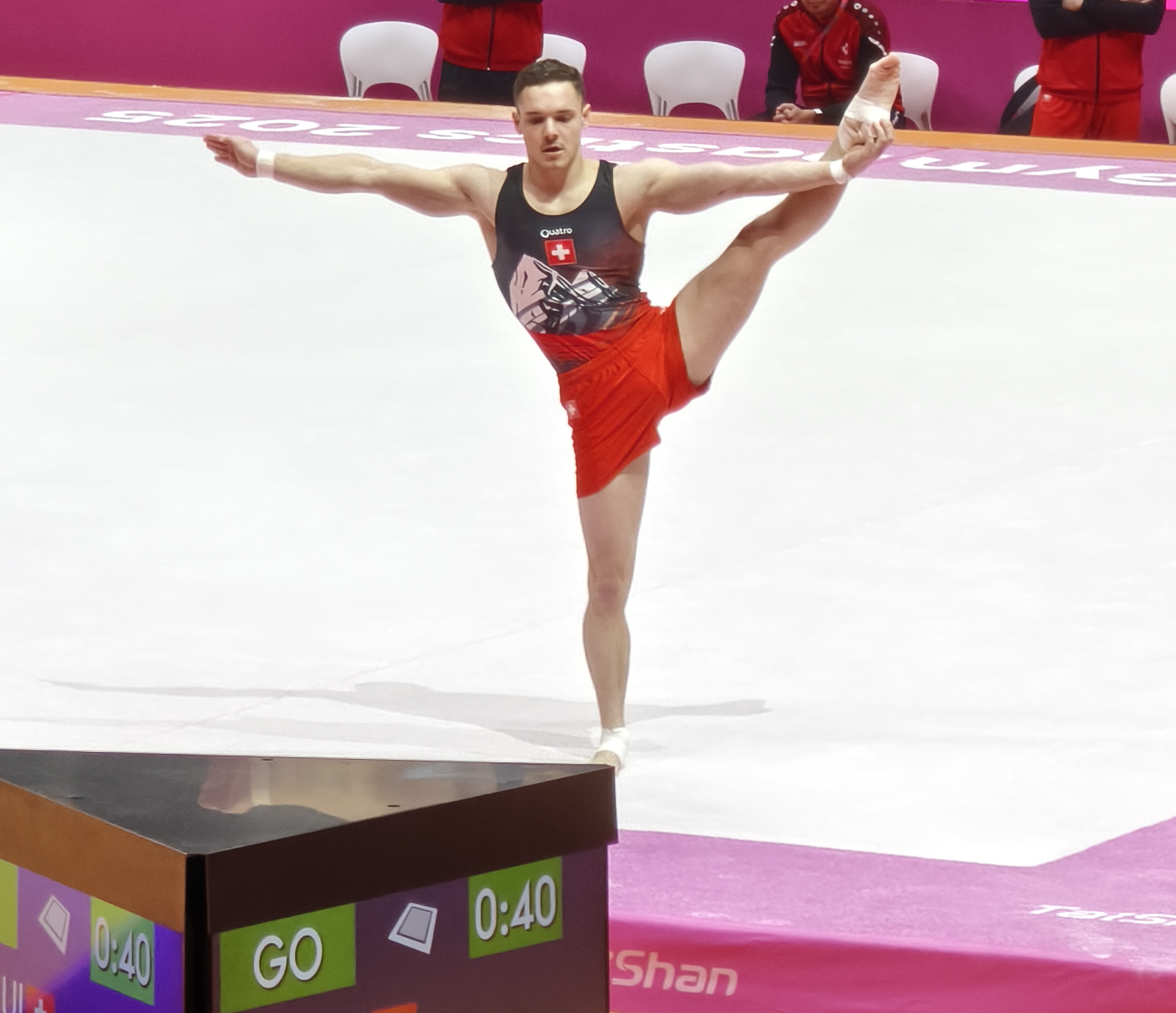
Seifert competing floor exercise at the 2025 World Championships

Seifert competed at the 2025 Cairo World Cup where he won silver on parallel bars and bronze on horizontal bar. At the 2025 European Championships Seifert led the Swiss team to a historic silver medal in the team event, Switzerland's best team finish and their second European team medal after winning bronze in 2016. At the 2025 World Championships Seifert won bronze in the all-around behind Daiki Hashimoto and Zhang Boheng. This marked the first all-around medal won by a Swiss male in 75 years, with the last all-around medals being won by Walter Lehmann (gold) and Marcel Adatte (silver) in 1950.

== Competitive history ==
Competitive history of Noe Seifert
Year	Event	Team	AA	FX	PH	SR	VT	PB	HB
2016
2016	Junior European Championships	3rd place, bronze medalist(s)							
2017	Voronin Cup		12						
2018	Austrian Team Open	2nd place, silver medalist(s)	3rd place, bronze medalist(s)						
2018	European Championships	5							
2018	Swiss Championships		4	2nd place, silver medalist(s)	3rd place, bronze medalist(s)				
2019	Magglingen Friendly	2nd place, silver medalist(s)	13						
2019	Swiss Championships		8						
2019	Swiss Team Championships	1st place, gold medalist(s)							
2021
2021	European Championships				13			85	
2021	Swiss Championships		6		2nd place, silver medalist(s)	3rd place, bronze medalist(s)		1st place, gold medalist(s)	
2021	Koper World Challenge Cup							6	
2021	Mersin World Challenge Cup				6				
2021	World Championships				35			21	
2021	Swiss Cup	4							
2022	Osijek World Challenge Cup							2nd place, silver medalist(s)	6
2022	Swiss Championships		1st place, gold medalist(s)		2nd place, silver medalist(s)	1st place, gold medalist(s)		1st place, gold medalist(s)	
2022	Magglingen Friendly	1st place, gold medalist(s)	7						
2022	European Championships	4	5						5
2022	Joaquim Blume Memorial		5						
2022	World Championships	20							
2022	Swiss Cup	9							
2023	DTB Pokal Team Challenge	5							
2023	European Championships	4	5	8				7	
2023	Lenzburg Friendly	2nd place, silver medalist(s)	2nd place, silver medalist(s)						
2023	Swiss Championships		1st place, gold medalist(s)	2nd place, silver medalist(s)	2nd place, silver medalist(s)	1st place, gold medalist(s)		5	2nd place, silver medalist(s)
2023	Magglingen Friendly	1st place, gold medalist(s)	1st place, gold medalist(s)						
2023	World Championships	5	8						
2024	Osijek World Challenge Cup							3rd place, bronze medalist(s)	
2024	European Championships	8						3rd place, bronze medalist(s)	4
2024	1st Swiss Olympic Trials		1st place, gold medalist(s)	3rd place, bronze medalist(s)	2nd place, silver medalist(s)	2nd place, silver medalist(s)			1st place, gold medalist(s)
2024	2nd Swiss Olympic Trials		2nd place, silver medalist(s)	1st place, gold medalist(s)		1st place, gold medalist(s)		1st place, gold medalist(s)	
2024	Swiss Championships		1st place, gold medalist(s)		6				
2024	Olympic Games	7							
2025	Cairo World Cup			4				2nd place, silver medalist(s)	3rd place, bronze medalist(s)
2025	European Championships	2nd place, silver medalist(s)	6						7
2025	Paris World Challenge Cup								8
2025	World Championships	—N/a	3rd place, bronze medalist(s)					R3	
2026	DTB Pokal Team Challenge	4	3rd place, bronze medalist(s)		5			6	
2026	DTB Pokal Mixed Cup	2nd place, silver medalist(s)							
2026	European Championships	3rd place, bronze medalist(s)	4						7
2026	World Championships	5	10					8	
2026	Swiss Cup	3rd place, bronze medalist(s)							
