= Ian Raubal =

Swiss gymnast

- Raubal in 2026.

Personal information
- Full name: Ian Michael Raubal
- Born: 6 August 2001 (age 25) Vienna, Austria

Gymnastics career
- Discipline: Men's artistic gymnastics
- Country represented: Switzerland
- College team: Penn State Nittany Lions (2022–2026)
Medal record
Men's artistic gymnastics
Representing Switzerland
European Championships
Silver medal – second place	2025 Leipzig	Team
Silver medal – second place	2025 Leipzig	Parallel bars
World University Games
Bronze medal – third place	2025 Rhine-Ruhr	Team

Ian Michael Raubal (born 6 August 2001) is a Swiss artistic gymnast. At the 2025 European Championships, he won a silver medal in the team event and on the parallel bars.

== Early life ==
Raubal was born in Vienna, Austria, to an American mother and an Austrian father, who is a professor at ETH Zürich. He lived in Santa Barbara, California, and in multiple other countries during his childhood. He now lives in Fällanden, Switzerland. He began gymnastics at the age of five.

== Gymnastics career ==
Raubal competed with the Swiss team that placed fourth at the 2018 Junior European Championships. He advanced into the parallel bars final and placed seventh.

Raubal joined the Penn State Nittany Lions gymnastics team in 2022, becoming the first Swiss gymnast to compete in NCAA gymnastics. During his freshman season, he won the Big Ten Freshman of the Week award twice and the Big Ten Gymnast of the Week award once. He then attended the World University Games in 2023 and placed 12th in the all-around final. He was unable to qualify for the 2024 Summer Olympics due to multiple injuries.

Raubal competed with the Swiss team that won the silver medal at the 2025 European Championships. He then won the silver medal in the parallel bars final, behind Nils Dunkel. Then at the World University Games, he won a bronze medal with the Swiss team. He also advanced into the parallel bars final, placing fourth.
