= Anthony Mansard =

French artistic gymnast (born 2006)

- Mansard at the 2026 Swiss Cup

Personal information
- Born: 5 December 2006 (age 19) Quincy-sous-Sénart, France

Gymnastics career
- Discipline: Men's artistic gymnastics
- Country represented: France; (2022–present)
- Club: Olympique Antibes Juan-les-Pins
- Head coach: Philippe Carmona
Medal record
Men's artistic gymnastics
Representing France
European Championships
Bronze medal – third place	2025 Leipzig	Horizontal bar

Anthony Mansard (born 5 December 2006) is a French artistic gymnast who is the 2025 European horizontal bar bronze medalist. He had a successful junior career, including winning the all-around and horizontal bar titles at the 2024 Junior European Championships. He won silver medals on the floor exercise at the 2022 Junior European Championships and the 2023 European Youth Summer Olympic Festival.

== Gymnastics career ==
Mansard began gymnastics when he was three years old. When he was ten years old, he moved away from his family in Réunion to train in Antibes.

Mansard won a silver medal on the floor exercise at the 2022 Junior European Championships. He competed at the 2023 Junior World Championships and placed eighth in the all-around. He placed fourth in both the floor exercise and horizontal bar finals. He was selected as one of France's flag bearers for the 2023 European Youth Summer Olympic Festival, where he won a silver medal on the floor exercise.

At the 2024 Junior European Championships, Mansard won the all-around title. He also won the gold medal on the horizontal bar, and he won silver medals on the floor exercise and the parallel bars. Additionally, he helped France win the bronze medal in the team competition.

Mansard began competing at the senior level in 2025. At his first senior-level French Championships, he finished second in the all-around to Léo Saladino. He was then selected to compete at the 2025 European Championships, and he won a bronze medal on the horizontal bar. He also advanced into the all-around final, finishing fourth. Additionally, he competed with Morgane Osyssek in the mixed team event, and they placed fourth.

At the 2025 World Championships, Mansard placed twelfth in the all-around.
