= 2025 European Artistic Gymnastics Championships =

11th European Men's and Women's Artistic Gymnastics Championships
- Venue: Leipzig Trade Fair
- Location: Leipzig, Germany
- Start date: 26 May 2025
- End date: 31 May 2025

The 11th European Men's and Women's Artistic Gymnastics Championships was an artistic gymnastics competition held from 26 to 31 May 2025 in Leipzig, Germany. It was the 46th European championships in total for men, and 36th in total for women (including the separate men's and women's championships held in even numbered years). For the first time a Mixed Team Final was contested.

Initially the event was to be held in Tel Aviv, Israel but was relocated to Leipzig due to the ongoing Gaza war.

Céleste Mordenti (LUX) and Eleftherios Petrounias (GRE) were awarded the Shooting Star Award.

== Competition schedule ==
Date	Session	Time	Subdivisions
Monday, 26 May
Monday, 26 May	Women's Team Final and Qualification for Individual Finals	10:00	Subdivision 1
Monday, 26 May	Women's Team Final and Qualification for Individual Finals	12:30	Subdivision 2
Monday, 26 May	Women's Team Final and Qualification for Individual Finals	15:30	Subdivision 3
Monday, 26 May	Women's Team Final and Qualification for Individual Finals	18:00	Subdivision 4
Tuesday, 27 May	Men's Team Final and Qualification for Individual Finals	10:00	Subdivision 1
Tuesday, 27 May	Men's Team Final and Qualification for Individual Finals	14:00	Subdivision 2
Tuesday, 27 May	Men's Team Final and Qualification for Individual Finals	17:30	Subdivision 3
Wednesday, 28 May	Mixed Team Final	17:00	Teams of 1 male and 1 female
Thursday, 29 May	Women's Individual All-Around Final	14:00	Top 24 from qualifications
Thursday, 29 May	Men's Individual All-Around Final	18:30	Top 24 from qualifications
Friday, 30 May	Individual Apparatus Finals	16:00	MAG: Floor, Pommel horse, Rings
Friday, 30 May	Individual Apparatus Finals	16:00	WAG: Vault, Uneven bars
Saturday, 31 May	Individual Apparatus Finals	13:00	MAG: Vault, Parallel bars, Horizontal bar
Saturday, 31 May	Individual Apparatus Finals	13:00	WAG: Balance beam, Floor
All times listed in local time (UTC+01:00).

== Medals summary ==
=== Medalists ===
Event	Gold	Silver	Bronze
Men
Team	(United Kingdom) Great Britain; Harry Hepworth; Jake Jarman; Jamie Lewis; Jonas Rushworth; Luke Whitehouse	Switzerland; Luca Giubellini; Matteo Giubellini; Florian Langenegger; Ian Raubal; Noe Seifert	Italy; Yumin Abbadini; Nicola Bartolini; Lorenzo Minh Casali; Edoardo de Rosa; Mario Macchiati
All-around	(Turkey) Adem Asil	(France) Léo Saladino	(Hungary) Krisztofer Mészáros
Floor	(United Kingdom) Luke Whitehouse	(United Kingdom) Harry Hepworth	(Italy) Lorenzo Minh Casali
Pommel horse	(Armenia) Hamlet Manukyan	(Armenia) Mamikon Khachatryan	(Italy) Gabriele Targhetta
Rings	(Turkey) Adem Asil (Greece) Eleftherios Petrounias	—N/a	(Armenia) Artur Avetisyan
Vault	(Armenia) Artur Davtyan	(United Kingdom) Jake Jarman	(Ukraine) Nazar Chepurnyi
Parallel bars	(Germany) Nils Dunkel	(Switzerland) Ian Raubal	(Germany) Timo Eder
Horizontal bar	(Lithuania) Robert Tvorogal	(Germany) Andreas Toba	(France) Anthony Mansard
Women
Team	Italy; Alice D'Amato; Manila Esposito; Emma Fioravanti; Giulia Perotti; Sofia Tonelli	Germany; Helen Kevric; Janoah Mueller; Lea Marie Quaas; Karina Schönmaier; Silja Stoehr	France; Lorette Charpy; Romane Hamelin; Djenna Laroui; Morgane Osyssek-Reimer; Ming van Eijken
All-around	(Italy) Manila Esposito	(Spain) Alba Petisco	(Romania) Ana Bărbosu
Vault	(Germany) Karina Schönmaier	(Bulgaria) Valentina Georgieva	(Belgium) Lisa Vaelen
Uneven bars	(Belgium) Nina Derwael	(Hungary) Bettina Lili Czifra	(Romania) Ana Bărbosu
Balance beam	(Belgium) Nina Derwael	(Romania) Ana Bărbosu	(Italy) Sofia Tonelli
Floor	(Romania) Ana Bărbosu	(Italy) Manila Esposito	(Spain) Alba Petisco
Mixed
Mixed team	Germany; Karina Schönmaier; Timo Eder	Great Britain; Ruby Evans; Jake Jarman	Italy; Manila Esposito; Lorenzo Minh Casali

=== Medal standings ===
==== Overall ====
* Host nation (Germany)

Rank	Nation	Gold	Silver	Bronze	Total
1	Germany (GER)*	3	2	1	6
2	Great Britain (GBR)	2	3	0	5
3	Italy (ITA)	2	1	5	8
4	Armenia (ARM)	2	1	1	4
5	Belgium (BEL)	2	0	1	3
6	Turkey (TUR)	2	0	0	2
7	Romania (ROU)	1	1	2	4
8	Greece (GRE)	1	0	0	1
8	Lithuania (LTU)	1	0	0	1
10	Switzerland (SUI)	0	2	0	2
11	France (FRA)	0	1	2	3
12	Hungary (HUN)	0	1	1	2
12	Spain (ESP)	0	1	1	2
14	Bulgaria (BUL)	0	1	0	1
15	Ukraine (UKR)	0	0	1	1
Totals (15 entries)		16	14	15	45

==== Men ====
* Host nation (Germany)

Rank	Nation	Gold	Silver	Bronze	Total
1	Great Britain (GBR)	2	2	0	4
2	Armenia (ARM)	2	1	1	4
3	Turkey (TUR)	2	0	0	2
4	Germany (GER)*	1	1	1	3
5	Greece (GRE)	1	0	0	1
5	Lithuania (LTU)	1	0	0	1
7	Switzerland (SUI)	0	2	0	2
8	France (FRA)	0	1	1	2
9	Italy (ITA)	0	0	3	3
10	Hungary (HUN)	0	0	1	1
10	Ukraine (UKR)	0	0	1	1
Totals (11 entries)		9	7	8	24

==== Women ====
* Host nation (Germany)

Rank	Nation	Gold	Silver	Bronze	Total
1	Italy (ITA)	2	1	1	4
2	Belgium (BEL)	2	0	1	3
3	Romania (ROU)	1	1	2	4
4	Germany (GER)*	1	1	0	2
5	Spain (ESP)	0	1	1	2
6	Bulgaria (BUL)	0	1	0	1
6	Hungary (HUN)	0	1	0	1
8	France (FRA)	0	0	1	1
Totals (8 entries)		6	6	6	18

==== Mixed ====
* Host nation (Germany)

Rank	Nation	Gold	Silver	Bronze	Total
1	Germany (GER)*	1	0	0	1
2	Great Britain (GBR)	0	1	0	1
3	Italy (ITA)	0	0	1	1
Totals (3 entries)		1	1	1	3

== Men's results ==
=== Team ===
Oldest and youngest competitors

	Name	Country	Date of birth	Age
Youngest	Hamlet Manukyan	Armenia	22 August 2007	17 years, 9 months and 5 days
Oldest	Eddie Penev	Bulgaria	16 August 1990	34 years, 9 months and 11 days

Rank	Team	Floor (gymnastics)	Pommel horse	Rings (gymnastics)	Vault (gymnastics)	Parallel bars	Horizontal bar	Total
1st place, gold medalist(s)	Great Britain	42.699	40.199	41.699	43.132	40.433	39.366	247.528
1st place, gold medalist(s)	Harry Hepworth	14.400		14.400	14.466			247.528
1st place, gold medalist(s)	Jake Jarman	14.033	13.466		14.766	13.700	13.000	247.528
1st place, gold medalist(s)	Jamie Lewis		13.633	13.666			13.233	247.528
1st place, gold medalist(s)	Jonas Rushworth		13.100			13.633	13.133	247.528
1st place, gold medalist(s)	Luke Whitehouse	14.266		13.633	13.900	13.100		247.528
2nd place, silver medalist(s)	Switzerland	41.398	41.399	38.866	42.266	41.366	40.432	245.727
2nd place, silver medalist(s)	Luca Giubellini	14.066	13.633		14.233			245.727
2nd place, silver medalist(s)	Matteo Giubellini	13.766	14.000			13.766	13.166	245.727
2nd place, silver medalist(s)	Florian Langenegger			12.600	14.133	13.700	13.300	245.727
2nd place, silver medalist(s)	Ian Raubal			13.266		13.900		245.727
2nd place, silver medalist(s)	Noe Seifert	13.566	13.766	13.000	13.900		13.966	245.727
3rd place, bronze medalist(s)	Italy	41.766	40.865	38.932	42.065	40.199	38.999	242.826
3rd place, bronze medalist(s)	Yumin Abbadini	13.633	14.233	12.766		13.266		242.826
3rd place, bronze medalist(s)	Nicola Bartolini	13.700			14.266		12.666	242.826
3rd place, bronze medalist(s)	Lorenzo Minh Casali	14.433		13.266	13.966	13.333	13.233	242.826
3rd place, bronze medalist(s)	Edoardo de Rosa		13.366			13.600		242.826
3rd place, bronze medalist(s)	Mario Macchiati		13.266	12.900	13.833		13.100	242.826
4	Germany	39.632	40.833	40.099	41.666	40.833	39.532	242.595
4	Nils Dunkel	13.066	13.833	13.433		13.800	12.733	242.595
4	Timo Eder	13.133	13.700		13.900	13.800	13.133	242.595
4	Milan Hosseini	13.433			13.966	13.233		242.595
4	Dario Sissakis			13.066	13.800			242.595
4	Andreas Toba		13.300	13.600			13.666	242.595
5	France	39.532	38.166	39.566	42.100	40.332	38.765	238.461
5	Romain Cavallaro	13.100			14.000	12.933		238.461
5	Loris Frasca	13.366			13.900		12.933	238.461
5	Justin Labro		12.600	12.900				238.461
5	Anthony Mansard	13.066	12.733	12.900		13.566	13.766	238.461
5	Léo Saladino		12.833	13.766	14.200	13.833	12.066	238.461
6	Netherlands	39.132	40.866	38.799	41.300	39.732	38.500	238.329
6	Loran de Munck		13.800			12.800		238.329
6	Elijah Faverus	12.966	13.766	13.033	13.700		12.900	238.329
6	Jermain Grünberg					13.566	12.800	238.329
6	Yazz Ramsahai	13.033		12.466	13.900			238.329
6	Casimir Schmidt	13.133	13.300	13.300	13.700	13.366	12.800	238.329
7	Hungary	40.599	40.599	38.099	41.200	38.899	38.866	238.262
7	Balázs Kiss		13.466					238.262
7	Krisztofer Mészáros	13.833	13.833	12.800	14.000	13.800	13.433	238.262
7	Benedek Tomcsányi	13.300	13.300	12.733	13.500	12.966	12.133	238.262
7	Zala Samu Zámbori					12.133	13.300	238.262
7	Szilárd Závory	13.466		12.566	13.700			238.262
8	Belgium	40.033	40.399	39.199	40.399	38.966	38.899	237.895
8	Nicola Cuyle	13.200	13.433	13.400		13.200		237.895
8	Victor Martinez	13.033	13.000	13.066	14.200	13.133	12.533	237.895
8	Takumi Onoshima	13.800		12.733	13.066	12.633	13.000	237.895
8	Senne Spyckerelle				13.133			237.895
8	Kilan Van Der Aa		13.966				13.366	237.895

=== Individual all-around ===
Oldest and youngest competitors

	Name	Country	Date of birth	Age
Youngest	Anthony Mansard	France	5 December 2006	18 years, 5 months and 24 days
Oldest	Néstor Abad	Spain	29 March 1993	32 years and 2 months

Rank	Gymnast	Floor (gymnastics)	Pommel horse	Rings (gymnastics)	Vault (gymnastics)	Parallel bars	Horizontal bar	Total
1st place, gold medalist(s)	(Turkey) Adem Asil	13.466	12.833	14.766	14.300	13.500	13.533	82.398
2nd place, silver medalist(s)	(France) Léo Saladino	13.866	12.866	13.566	13.966	14.000	13.166	81.430
3rd place, bronze medalist(s)	(Hungary) Krisztofer Mészáros	13.966	13.133	12.933	13.833	13.933	13.366	81.164
4	(France) Anthony Mansard	13.566	12.800	12.700	13.866	14.066	14.100	81.098
5	(Germany) Nils Dunkel	13.600	14.100	13.500	13.266	13.733	12.733	80.932
6	(Switzerland) Noe Seifert	13.133	13.566	12.933	13.733	14.266	13.000	80.631
7	(Spain) Joel Plata	13.833	13.333	13.100	13.600	13.433	13.166	80.465
8	(Netherlands) Casimir Schmidt	13.366	13.233	13.033	14.100	13.433	12.933	80.098
9	(United Kingdom) Jamie Lewis	12.100	13.900	13.466	13.766	13.366	13.200	79.798
10	(Switzerland) Matteo Giubellini	13.733	13.666	12.566	13.166	13.066	13.466	79.663
11	(Netherlands) Elijah Faverus	13.000	13.766	12.900	13.700	12.766	13.133	79.265
12	(Italy) Yumin Abbadini	12.300	13.300	12.566	13.633	13.400	14.033	79.232
13	(Germany) Timo Eder	13.466	13.066	12.200	13.433	13.900	13.166	79.231
14	(Ukraine) Nazar Chepurnyi	13.633	11.866	12.300	14.766	13.733	12.700	78.998
15	(Hungary) Benedek Tomcsányi	13.100	13.233	13.066	13.233	13.233	12.566	78.431
16	(Finland) Robert Kirmes	12.233	13.100	13.200	13.533	12.733	13.566	78.365
17	(Ukraine) Vladyslav Hryko	12.266	12.666	12.800	13.266	13.133	13.533	77.664
18	(Belgium) Nicola Cuyle	13.366	12.233	13.400	12.700	13.666	11.933	77.298
19	(Italy) Mario Macchiati	13.600	13.366	12.966	12.500	11.833	12.800	77.065
20	(Belgium) Victor Martinez	13.400	10.466	12.966	14.133	12.966	13.133	77.064
21	(Poland) Kacper Garnczarek	13.333	12.900	11.566	12.600	13.366	13.133	76.898
22	(United Kingdom) Luke Whitehouse	14.333	11.366	13.533	13.333	12.700	10.833	76.098
–	(Norway) Sebastian Sponevik	–	–	–	14.400	13.166	11.000	DNF
–	(Spain) Néstor Abad	–	–	–	12.233	12.600	–	DNF

=== Floor exercise ===
Oldest and youngest competitors

	Name	Country	Date of birth	Age
Youngest	Harry Hepworth	Great Britain	6 December 2003	21 years, 5 months and 24 days
Oldest	Artem Dolgopyat	Israel	16 June 1997	27 years, 11 months and 14 days

Rank	Gymnast	D Score	E Score	Pen.	Bon.	Total
1st place, gold medalist(s)	(United Kingdom) Luke Whitehouse	6.1	8.300		0.100	14.500
2nd place, silver medalist(s)	(United Kingdom) Harry Hepworth	6.1	8.266			14.366
3rd place, bronze medalist(s)	(Italy) Lorenzo Minh Casali	5.6	8.466	0.100		13.966
4	(Ukraine) Nazar Chepurnyi	5.1	8.266	0.200		13.166
5	(Bulgaria) Kevin Penev	5.4	7.466			12.866
6	(Switzerland) Luca Murabito	5.5	7.366			12.866
7	(Israel) Artem Dolgopyat	5.7	7.133	0.300	0.100	12.633
8	(Switzerland) Luca Giubellini	5.1	6.500			11.600

=== Pommel horse ===
Oldest and youngest competitors

	Name	Country	Date of birth	Age
Youngest	Hamlet Manukyan	Armenia	22 August 2007	17 years, 9 months and 8 days
Oldest	Matvei Petrov	Albania	16 July 1990	34 years, 10 months and 14 days

Rank	Gymnast	D Score	E Score	Pen.	Total
1st place, gold medalist(s)	(Armenia) Hamlet Manukyan	5.6	9.166		14.766
2nd place, silver medalist(s)	(Armenia) Mamikon Khachatryan	5.7	9.033		14.733
3rd place, bronze medalist(s)	(Italy) Gabriele Targhetta	5.9	8.500		14.400
4	(Albania) Matvei Petrov	5.6	8.766		14.366
5	(Slovenia) Gregor Rakovic	5.5	8.733		14.233
6	(Italy) Yumin Abbadini	5.5	8.666		14.166
7	(Lithuania) Kristijonas Padegimas	5.2	8.900		14.100
8	(Finland) Robert Kirmes	5.4	8.033		13.433

=== Rings ===
Oldest and youngest competitors

	Name	Country	Date of birth	Age
Youngest	Harry Hepworth	Great Britain	6 December 2003	21 years, 5 months and 24 days
Oldest	Vahagn Davtyan	Armenia	18 August 1988	36 years, 9 months and 12 days

Rank	Gymnast	D Score	E Score	Pen.	Bon.	Total
1st place, gold medalist(s)	(Turkey) Adem Asil	5.7	8.700			14.400
1st place, gold medalist(s)	(Greece) Eleftherios Petrounias	5.7	8.700			14.400
3rd place, bronze medalist(s)	(Armenia) Artur Avetisyan	5.4	8.966			14.366
4	(Azerbaijan) Nikita Simonov	5.5	8.733		0.100	14.333
5	(United Kingdom) Harry Hepworth	5.8	8.533			14.333
5	(United Kingdom) Courtney Tulloch	5.8	8.533			14.333
7	(Armenia) Vahagn Davtyan	5.4	8.666		0.100	14.166
8	(France) Samir Aït Saïd	5.3	8.766			14.066

=== Vault ===
Oldest and youngest competitors

	Name	Country	Date of birth	Age
Youngest	Sebastian Sponevik	Norway	15 March 2005	20 years, 2 months and 16 days
Oldest	Artur Davtyan	Armenia	8 August 1992	32 years, 9 months and 23 days

Rank	Gymnast	Vault 1					Vault 2					Total
Rank	Gymnast	D Score	E Score	Pen.	Bon.	Score 1	D Score	E Score	Pen.	Bon.	Score 2	Total
1st place, gold medalist(s)	(Armenia) Artur Davtyan	5.2	9.466		0.100	14.766	5.2	9.533		0.100	14.833	14.799
2nd place, silver medalist(s)	(United Kingdom) Jake Jarman	5.6	9.500		0.100	15.200	5.2	9.066			14.266	14.733
3rd place, bronze medalist(s)	(Ukraine) Nazar Chepurnyi	5.2	9.300			14.500	5.2	9.466			14.666	14.583
4	(United Kingdom) Harry Hepworth	5.2	9.000			14.200	5.2	9.300			14.500	14.350
5	(Norway) Sebastian Sponevik	5.2	9.033	0.100		14.133	4.8	9.133			13.933	14.033
6	(Cyprus) Neofytos Kyriakou	4.8	8.900			13.700	4.4	9.000			13.400	13.550
7	(Italy) Nicola Bartolini	4.8	9.066			13.866	4.8	8.200	0.100		12.900	13.383
8	(Netherlands) Yazz Ramsahai	4.8	8.766			13.566	5.2	7.933			13.133	13.349

=== Parallel bars ===
Oldest and youngest competitors

	Name	Country	Date of birth	Age
Youngest	Timo Eder	Germany	11 June 2005	19 years, 11 months and 20 days
Oldest	Ferhat Arıcan	Turkey	28 July 1993	31 years, 10 months and 3 days

Rank	Gymnast	D Score	E Score	Pen.	Bon.	Total
1st place, gold medalist(s)	(Germany) Nils Dunkel	5.3	8.600			13.900
2nd place, silver medalist(s)	(Switzerland) Ian Raubal	5.2	8.566			13.766
3rd place, bronze medalist(s)	(Germany) Timo Eder	4.9	9.000	0.300	0.100	13.700
4	(France) Léo Saladino	4.9	8.433			13.333
5	(United Kingdom) Courtney Tulloch	5.1	7.766			12.866
5	(Norway) Harald Wibye	5.1	7.766			12.866
7	(Turkey) Ferhat Arıcan	5.0	7.333	0.300		12.033
8	(Ukraine) Oleg Verniaiev	4.4	7.000		0.100	11.500

=== Horizontal bar ===
Oldest and youngest competitors

	Name	Country	Date of birth	Age
Youngest	Anthony Mansard	France	5 December 2006	18 years, 5 months and 26 days
Oldest	Andreas Toba	Germany	7 October 1990	34 years, 7 months and 24 days

Rank	Gymnast	D Score	E Score	Pen.	Bon.	Total
1st place, gold medalist(s)	(Lithuania) Robert Tvorogal	5.4	8.900			14.300
2nd place, silver medalist(s)	(Germany) Andreas Toba	5.4	8.500		0.100	14.000
3rd place, bronze medalist(s)	(France) Anthony Mansard	5.0	8.866		0.100	13.966
4	(Cyprus) Marios Georgiou	5.3	8.566			13.866
5	(Turkey) Adem Asil	4.8	8.833			13.633
6	(Hungary) Krisztofer Mészáros	5.2	8.333			13.533
7	(Switzerland) Noe Seifert	5.4	7.666			13.066
8	(Spain) Joel Plata	4.1	6.066			10.166

== Women's results ==
=== Team ===
Oldest and youngest competitors

	Name	Country	Date of birth	Age
Youngest	Frances Stone	Great Britain	21 December 2009	15 years, 5 months and 5 days
Oldest	Marta Pihan-Kulesza	Poland	23 July 1987	37 years, 10 months and 3 days

Rank	Team	Vault (gymnastics)	Uneven bars	Balance beam	Floor (gymnastics)	Total
1st place, gold medalist(s)	Italy	40.599	40.399	40.999	39.933	161.930
1st place, gold medalist(s)	Manila Esposito		13.666	14.300	13.800	161.930
1st place, gold medalist(s)	Sofia Tonelli	13.366	13.400	13.566	13.000	161.930
1st place, gold medalist(s)	Emma Fioravanti	13.233			13.133	161.930
1st place, gold medalist(s)	Alice D'Amato	14.000		13.133		161.930
1st place, gold medalist(s)	Giulia Perotti		13.333			161.930
2nd place, silver medalist(s)	Germany	40.599	40.465	39.133	38.199	158.396
2nd place, silver medalist(s)	Helen Kevric	13.700	14.766	13.100	12.366	158.396
2nd place, silver medalist(s)	Janoah Mueller			12.900		158.396
2nd place, silver medalist(s)	Lea Marie Quaas		12.833	13.133		158.396
2nd place, silver medalist(s)	Karina Schönmaier	13.966	12.866		13.200	158.396
2nd place, silver medalist(s)	Silja Stoehr	12.933			12.633	158.396
3rd place, bronze medalist(s)	France	39.899	38.699	39.732	38.398	156.728
3rd place, bronze medalist(s)	Lorette Charpy	13.000	13.233	13.366	12.466	156.728
3rd place, bronze medalist(s)	Ming van Eijken	13.966			13.166	156.728
3rd place, bronze medalist(s)	Romane Hamelin			12.633		156.728
3rd place, bronze medalist(s)	Djenna Laroui		13.000			156.728
3rd place, bronze medalist(s)	Morgane Osyssek-Reimer	12.933	12.466	13.733	12.766	156.728
4	Romania	39.133	38.966	39.066	39.066	156.231
4	Lilia Cosman	12.800		12.166	12.600	156.231
4	Sabrina Maneca-Voinea					156.231
4	Ella Oprea		13.100			156.231
4	Ana Bărbosu	13.333	13.400	13.600	13.600	156.231
4	Denisa Golgotă	13.000	12.466	13.300	12.866	156.231
5	Netherlands	40.099	39.932	37.632	37.499	155.162
5	Elze Geurts	13.933	13.100		12.433	155.162
5	Floor Slooff	13.066			12.500	155.162
5	Tisha Volleman		12.866	12.266		155.162
5	Mara Slippens	13.100		12.300		155.162
5	Naomi Visser		13.966	13.066	12.566	155.162
6	Great Britain	40.699	37.732	37.566	38.698	154.695
6	Alia Leat	13.400		12.633	12.466	154.695
6	Frances Stone			12.833		154.695
6	Ruby Evans	13.833	11.566	12.100	13.266	154.695
6	Ruby Stacey	13.466	13.166			154.695
6	Emily Roper		13.000		12.966	154.695
7	Sweden	38.932	38.133	39.399	37.766	154.230
7	Elina Gravin	13.066			12.200	154.230
7	Maya Staahl		12.200	12.600	12.133	154.230
7	Emelie Westlund		12.633			154.230
7	Nathalie Westlund	12.600	13.300	12.266		154.230
7	Jennifer Williams	13.266		14.533	13.433	154.230
8	Hungary	38.665	40.265	38.499	36.766	154.195
8	Gréta Mayer	13.233		12.966	12.533	154.195
8	Zója Székely	12.666	13.566	12.733		154.195
8	Lilla Makai		13.266		11.533	154.195
8	Bettina Lili Czifra	12.766	13.433	12.800		154.195
8	Sára Péter				12.700	154.195

=== Individual all-around ===
Oldest and youngest competitors

	Name	Country	Date of birth	Age
Youngest	Yali Shoshani	Israel	9 October 2008	16 years, 7 months and 20 days
Oldest	Naomi Visser	Netherlands	24 August 2001	23 years, 9 months and 25 days

Rank	Gymnast	Vault (gymnastics)	Uneven bars	Balance beam	Floor (gymnastics)	Total
1st place, gold medalist(s)	(Italy) Manila Esposito	13.400	13.566	14.333	13.666	54.965
2nd place, silver medalist(s)	(Spain) Alba Petisco	13.533	13.166	13.333	13.233	53.265
3rd place, bronze medalist(s)	(Romania) Ana Bărbosu	13.433	13.533	11.633	13.700	52.299
4	(France) Morgane Osyssek-Reimer	13.100	12.700	13.700	12.500	52.000
5	(France) Lorette Charpy	13.000	13.400	13.066	12.366	51.832
6	(Netherlands) Naomi Visser	12.666	14.133	13.166	11.800	51.765
7	(Romania) Denisa Golgotă	13.233	12.966	12.700	12.833	51.732
8	(Czech Republic) Vanesa Mašová	13.000	13.466	13.233	11.900	51.599
9	(Italy) Sofia Tonelli	13.500	11.833	13.366	12.533	51.232
10	(United Kingdom) Ruby Evans	13.966	11.066	12.466	13.466	50.964
11	(Finland) Kaia Tanskanen	13.000	12.500	12.466	12.833	50.799
12	(Israel) Yali Shoshani	12.766	13.000	12.200	12.766	50.732
13	(Belgium) Jade Vansteenkiste	13.066	12.533	11.700	13.000	50.299
14	(Hungary) Gréta Mayer	13.233	12.500	12.966	11.300	49.999
15	(Slovenia) Lucija Hribar	13.033	12.600	12.166	11.833	49.632
16	(Switzerland) Anny Wu	12.700	12.466	12.500	11.966	49.632
17	(Finland) Maisa Kuusikko	13.366	13.633	11.833	10.733	49.565
18	(Hungary) Zója Székely	12.066	13.566	12.133	11.766	49.531
19	(Israel) Lihie Raz	12.933	12.533	11.400	12.333	49.199
20	(Germany) Janoah Müller	12.733	12.866	10.933	12.600	49.132
21	(Austria) Leni Bohle	12.900	11.366	11.533	12.500	48.299
22	(Austria) Selina Kickinger	12.533	12.633	10.600	11.333	47.099
23	(Turkey) Nazlı Savranbaşı	12.433	10.000	11.200	12.000	45.633
–	(Germany) Helen Kevric	12.866	–	–	–	DNF

- (Germany) Helen Kevric suffered an injury on vault and subsequently withdrew from the remainder of the competition.
- (Germany) Karina Schönmaier withdrew from the competition and was replaced by her teammate (Germany) Janoah Müller who had not qualified previously due to the two-per-country rule.

=== Vault ===
Oldest and youngest competitors

	Name	Country	Date of birth	Age
Youngest	Ming van Eijken	France	3 April 2008	17 years, 1 month and 27 days
Oldest	Teja Belak	Slovenia	22 April 1994	31 years, 1 month and 8 days

Rank	Gymnast	Vault 1				Vault 2				Bonus	Total
Rank	Gymnast	D Score	E Score	Pen.	Score 1	D Score	E Score	Pen.	Score 2	Bonus	Total
1st place, gold medalist(s)	(Germany) Karina Schönmaier	5.0	9.066		14.066	4.8	8.800	0.100	13.500	0.2	13.983
2nd place, silver medalist(s)	(Bulgaria) Valentina Georgieva	5.0	9.100		14.100	4.8	8.900		13.700		13.900
3rd place, bronze medalist(s)	(Belgium) Lisa Vaelen	5.4	8.533		13.933	4.4	8.600		13.000	0.2	13.666
4	(Slovenia) Teja Belak	4.4	8.633		13.033	4.6	9.033		13.633	0.2	13.533
5	(Netherlands) Elisabeth Geurts	5.0	8.566		13.566	4.0	8.500		12.500	0.2	13.233
6	(Spain) Laia Font	5.0	8.466		13.466	4.4	8.600		13.000		13.233
7	(France) Ming van Eijken	5.4	7.666	0.100	12.966	4.4	8.700		13.100		13.033
8	(Hungary) Gréta Mayer	4.4	8.933		13.333	4.6	7.666	0.300	11.966		12.649

=== Uneven bars ===
Oldest and youngest competitors

	Name	Country	Date of birth	Age
Youngest	Vanesa Mašová	Czech Republic	1 July 2008	16 years, 10 months and 29 days
Oldest	Nina Derwael	Belgium	26 March 2000	25 years, 2 months and 4 days

Rank	Gymnast	D Score	E Score	Pen.	Total
1st place, gold medalist(s)	(Belgium) Nina Derwael	6.3	8.166		14.466
2nd place, silver medalist(s)	(Hungary) Bettina Lili Czifra	6.1	8.000		14.100
3rd place, bronze medalist(s)	(Romania) Ana Bărbosu	5.9	7.866		13.766
4	(Finland) Maisa Kuusikko	6.1	7.500		13.600
5	(Czech Republic) Vanesa Mašová	5.7	7.800		13.500
6	(Italy) Sofia Tonelli	5.9	7.400		13.300
7	(Hungary) Zója Székely	6.0	7.200		13.200
8	(Netherlands) Naomi Visser	5.1	7.200		12.300
9	(Italy) Manila Esposito	5.4	6.833		12.233

- (Germany) Helen Kevric withdrew due to injury and was replaced by joint first reserves (Romania) Ana Bărbosu and (Italy) Sofia Tonelli.

=== Balance beam ===
Oldest and youngest competitors

	Name	Country	Date of birth	Age
Youngest	Sofia Tonelli	Italy	18 November 2007	17 years, 6 months and 13 days
Oldest	Nina Derwael	Belgium	26 March 2000	25 years, 2 months and 5 days

Rank	Gymnast	D Score	E Score	Pen.	Total
1st place, gold medalist(s)	(Belgium) Nina Derwael	5.6	8.433		14.033
2nd place, silver medalist(s)	(Romania) Ana Bărbosu	5.6	8.066		13.666
3rd place, bronze medalist(s)	(Italy) Sofia Tonelli	5.5	8.133		13.633
4	(France) Morgane Osyssek-Reimer	5.8	7.600		13.400
5	(France) Lorette Charpy	5.4	7.566		12.966
6	(Sweden) Jennifer Williams	6.1	6.433		12.533
7	(Italy) Manila Esposito	4.9	7.300		12.200
8	(Romania) Denisa Golgotă	5.4	6.600		12.000

=== Floor exercise ===
Oldest and youngest competitors

	Name	Country	Date of birth	Age
Youngest	Emma Fioravanti	Italy	6 October 2009	15 years, 7 months and 25 days
Oldest	Alba Petisco	Spain	1 February 2003	22 years, 3 months and 30 days

Rank	Gymnast	D Score	E Score	Pen.	Total
1st place, gold medalist(s)	(Romania) Ana Bărbosu	5.7	8.133		13.833
2nd place, silver medalist(s)	(Italy) Manila Esposito	5.7	8.000		13.700
3rd place, bronze medalist(s)	(Spain) Alba Petisco	5.7	7.866		13.566
4	(United Kingdom) Ruby Evans	5.4	8.033		13.433
5	(Italy) Emma Fioravanti	5.5	7.733		13.233
6	(Germany) Karina Schönmaier	5.1	7.866		12.966
7	(France) Ming van Eijken	5.7	6.500		12.200
8	(Sweden) Jennifer Williams	5.1	6.833		11.933

== Mixed team results ==
=== Round 1 ===
Rank	Team	Gymnast	Apparatus	Scores	Total	Qual.
1	Switzerland	Noe Seifert	Parallel bars	14.200	27.033	Q
1	Switzerland	Anny Wu	Vault (gymnastics)	12.833	27.033	Q
2	Great Britain	Jake Jarman	Parallel bars	13.633	26.999	Q
2	Great Britain	Ruby Evans	Floor (gymnastics)	13.366	26.999	Q
3	Italy	Lorenzo Minh Casali	Floor (gymnastics)	13.000	26.766	Q
3	Italy	Manila Esposito	Floor (gymnastics)	13.766	26.766	Q
4	France	Anthony Mansard	Parallel bars	13.300	26.400	Q
4	France	Morgane Osyssek-Reimer	Vault (gymnastics)	13.100	26.400	Q
5	Spain	Néstor Abad	Parallel bars	12.733	26.266	Q
5	Spain	Alba Petisco	Vault (gymnastics)	13.533	26.266	Q
6	Germany	Timo Eder	Floor (gymnastics)	13.433	26.266	Q
6	Germany	Karina Schönmaier	Floor (gymnastics)	12.833	26.266	Q
7	Belgium	Takumi Onoshima	Floor (gymnastics)	13.100	26.066	Q
7	Belgium	Jade Vansteenkiste	Vault (gymnastics)	12.966	26.066	Q
8	Norway	Peder Skogvang	Floor (gymnastics)	13.26	26.032	Q
8	Norway	Keisha Lockert	Vault (gymnastics)	12.766	26.032	Q
9	Netherlands	Casimir Schmidt	Parallel bars	12.900	25.766	
9	Netherlands	Naomi Visser	Vault (gymnastics)	12.866	25.766	
10	Hungary	Krisztofer Meszaros	Floor (gymnastics)	13.566	25.666	
10	Hungary	Greta Mayer	Balance beam	12.100	25.666	
11	Poland	Kacper Garnczarek	Floor (gymnastics)	13.100	25.366	
11	Poland	Maria Drobniak	Floor (gymnastics)	12.266	25.366	
12	Sweden	William Hyll	Parallel bars	11.566	24.999	
12	Sweden	Jennifer Williams	Balance beam	13.433	24.999	
13	Finland	Robert Kirmes	Floor (gymnastics)	12.000	24.966	
13	Finland	Kaia Tanskanen	Vault (gymnastics)	12.966	24.966	
14	Israel	Uri Zeidel	Parallel bars	11.800	24.633	
14	Israel	Lihie Raz	Vault (gymnastics)	12.833	24.633	
15	Austria	Alexander Benda	Parallel bars	12.633	24.433	
15	Austria	Selina Kickinger	Vault (gymnastics)	11.800	24.433	
16	Turkey	Adem Asil	Parallel bars	12.233	24.333	
16	Turkey	Nazlı Savranbaşı	Vault (gymnastics)	12.100	24.333	

the team advanced to round 2

=== Round 2 ===
Rank	Team	Gymnast	Apparatus	Scores	Total	Qual.
1	Great Britain	Jake Jarman	Floor (gymnastics)	14.400	28.366	Q
1	Great Britain	Ruby Evans	Vault (gymnastics)	13.966	28.366	Q
2	Germany	Timo Eder	Parallel bars	13.933	27.866	Q
2	Germany	Karina Schönmaier	Vault (gymnastics)	13.933	27.866	Q
3	Italy	Lorenzo Minh Casali	Floor (gymnastics)	14.000	27.466	Q
3	Italy	Manila Esposito	Vault (gymnastics)	13.466	27.466	Q
4	France	Anthony Mansard	Horizontal bar	13.600	27.100	Q
4	France	Morgane Osyssek-Reimer	Balance beam	13.500	27.100	Q
5	Spain	Néstor Abad	Floor (gymnastics)	13.000	25.033	
5	Spain	Alba Petisco	Balance beam	12.033	25.033	
6	Belgium	Takumi Onoshima	Horizontal bar	12.433	24.766	
6	Belgium	Jade Vansteenkiste	Floor (gymnastics)	12.333	24.766	
7	Norway	Peder Skogvang	Horizontal bar	11.533	24.666	
7	Norway	Keisha Lockert	Balance beam	13.133	24.666	
8	Switzerland	Noe Seifert	Floor (gymnastics)	11.933	23.333	
8	Switzerland	Anny Wu	Floor (gymnastics)	11.400	23.333	

the team advanced to the championship match
the team advanced to the third place match

=== Round 3: Third place match ===
Rank	Team	Gymnast	Apparatus	Scores	Total
3rd place, bronze medalist(s)	Italy	Lorenzo Minh Casali	Parallel bars	13.700	27.966
3rd place, bronze medalist(s)	Italy	Manila Esposito	Balance beam	14.266	27.966
4	France	Anthony Mansard	Floor (gymnastics)	13.033	25.699
4	France	Morgane Osyssek-Reimer	Floor (gymnastics)	12.666	25.699

=== Round 4: Championship match ===
Rank	Team	Gymnast	Apparatus	Scores	Total
1st place, gold medalist(s)	Germany	Timo Eder	Horizontal bar	13.333	25.566
1st place, gold medalist(s)	Germany	Karina Schönmaier	Balance beam	12.233	25.566
2nd place, silver medalist(s)	Great Britain	Jake Jarman	Horizontal bar	13.333	25.466
2nd place, silver medalist(s)	Great Britain	Ruby Evans	Balance beam	12.133	25.466

== Qualification ==
=== Men's results ===
==== Individual all-around ====
Rank	Gymnast	Floor (gymnastics)	Pommel horse	Rings (gymnastics)	Vault (gymnastics)	Parallel bars	Horizontal bar	Total	Qual.
1	(Switzerland) Noe Seifert	13.566	13.766	13.000	13.900	13.700	13.966	81.898	Q
2	(Hungary) Krisztofer Mészáros	13.833	13.833	12.800	14.000	13.800	13.433	81.699	Q
3	(United Kingdom) Luke Whitehouse	14.266	12.833	13.633	13.900	13.100	13.000	80.732	Q
4	(Switzerland) Matteo Giubellini	13.766	14.000	12.533	13.200	13.766	13.166	80.431	Q
5	(Switzerland) Florian Langenegger	13.066	13.566	12.600	14.133	13.700	13.300	80.365	–
6	(Turkey) Adem Asil	12.833	12.166	14.533	13.500	13.633	13.533	80.198	Q
7	(United Kingdom) Jamie Lewis	13.633	13.633	13.666	13.500	12.500	13.233	80.165	Q
8	(Germany) Nils Dunkel	13.066	13.833	13.433	13.300	13.800	12.733	80.165	Q
9	(Germany) Timo Eder	13.133	13.700	12.466	13.900	13.800	13.133	80.132	Q
10	(Finland) Robert Kirmes	13.400	14.066	13.633	13.600	13.366	12.033	80.098	Q
11	(Italy) Yumin Abbadini	13.633	14.233	12.766	13.600	13.266	12.600	80.098	Q
12	(France) Anthony Mansard	13.066	12.733	12.900	13.766	13.566	13.766	79.797	Q
13	(Netherlands) Casimir Schmidt	13.133	13.300	13.300	13.700	13.366	12.800	79.599	Q
14	(Belgium) Víctor Martínez	13.033	13.000	13.066	14.200	13.133	12.533	78.965	Q
15	(Ukraine) Nazar Chepurnyi	14.100	12.600	12.133	14.233	13.000	12.633	78.699	Q
16	(Ukraine) Vladyslav Hryko	12.900	13.333	12.933	13.333	12.733	13.400	78.632	Q
17	(Belgium) Nicola Cuyle	13.200	13.433	13.400	12.633	13.200	12.366	78.232	Q
18	(France) Léo Saladino	11.466	12.833	13.766	14.200	13.833	12.066	78.164	Q
19	(Belgium) Takumi Onoshima	13.800	12.900	12.733	13.066	12.633	13.000	78.132	–
20	(Italy) Mario Macchiati	11.800	13.266	12.900	13.833	13.200	13.100	78.099	Q
21	(Hungary) Benedek Tomcsányi	13.300	13.300	12.733	13.500	12.966	12.133	77.932	Q
22	(Spain) Néstor Abad	12.333	12.900	12.600	13.866	13.033	13.066	77.798	Q
23	(Netherlands) Elijah Faverus	12.966	13.766	13.033	13.700	11.366	12.900	77.731	Q
24	(Spain) Joel Plata	13.233	13.133	13.133	13.266	11.100	13.700	77.565	Q
25	(Poland) Kacper Garnczarek	13.333	13.366	11.500	13.466	12.866	12.900	77.431	Q
26	(Norway) Sebastian Sponevik	13.733	12.066	13.100	14.266	13.200	11.000	77.365	Q
27	(Norway) Harald Wibye	12.500	12.666	12.000	13.266	13.800	12.700	76.932	R1
28	(Netherlands) Jermain Gruenberg	12.400	12.600	12.333	13.166	13.566	12.800	76.865	–
28	(Finland) Elias Koski	12.966	12.066	12.600	13.333	12.200	13.366	76.531	R2
30	(Norway) Peder Skogvang	13.933	11.366	12.000	13.266	12.566	13.300	76.431	–
31	(Israel) Uri Zeidel	12.900	12.633	12.266	12.900	13.066	12.533	76.298	R3

==== Floor exercise ====
Rank	Gymnast	D Score	E Score	Pen.	Total	Qual.
1	(Italy) Lorenzo Minh Casali	5.6	8.733		14.433	Q
2	(Israel) Artem Dolgopyat	5.8	8.700	0.100	14.400	Q
3	(United Kingdom) Harry Hepworth	6.1	8.300		14.400	Q
4	(United Kingdom) Luke Whitehouse	6.1	8.166		14.266	Q
5	(Switzerland) Luca Murabito	5.7	8.466		14.166	Q
6	(Ukraine) Nazar Chepurnyi	5.1	8.900		14.100	Q
7	(Switzerland) Luca Giubellini	5.3	8.666		14.066	Q
8	(United Kingdom) Jake Jarman	6.1	7.933		14.033	–
9	(Bulgaria) Kevin Penev	5.4	8.600		14.000	Q
10	(Norway) Peder Skogvang	5.2	8.633		13.933	R1
11	(Bulgaria) Eddie Penev	5.4	8.466		13.866	R2
12	(Slovenia) Nikolaj Bozic	5.2	8.533		13.833	R3

==== Pommel horse ====
Rank	Gymnast	D Score	E Score	Pen.	Total	Qual.
1	(Armenia) Hamlet Manukyan	5.6	8.966		14.566	Q
2	(Italy) Gabriele Targhetta	5.9	8.633		14.533	Q
3	(Armenia) Mamikon Khachatryan	5.5	8.900		14.400	Q
4	(Albania) Matvei Petrov	5.6	8.733		14.333	Q
5	(Italy) Yumin Abbadini	5.5	8.733		14.233	Q
6	(Slovenia) Gregor Rakovic	5.3	8.766		14.066	Q
7	(Finland) Robert Kirmes	5.4	8.666		14.066	Q
8	(Lithuania) Kristijonas Padegimas	5.2	8.833		14.033	Q
9	(Israel) Eyal Indig	5.6	8.433		14.033	R1
10	(Switzerland) Matteo Giubellini	5.4	8.600		14.000	R2
11	(Belgium) Kilan Van Der Aa	5.7	8.266		13.966	R3

==== Rings ====
Rank	Gymnast	D Score	E Score	Pen.	Total	Qual.
1	(Greece) Eleftherios Petrounias	5.7	9.000		14.700	Q
2	(Turkey) Adem Asil	5.7	8.833		14.533	Q
3	(United Kingdom) Harry Hepworth	5.8	8.600		14.400	Q
3	(United Kingdom) Courtney Tulloch	5.8	8.600		14.400	Q
5	(Armenia) Artur Avetisyan	5.4	8.900		14.300	Q
6	(France) Samir Aït Saïd	5.3	8.833		14.233	Q
7	(Azerbaijan) Nikita Simonov	5.4	8.466		14.033	Q
8	(Armenia) Vahagn Davtyan	5.4	8.466		13.866	Q
9	(France) Léo Saladino	5.0	8.666		13.766	R1
10	(United Kingdom) Jamie Lewis	4.8	8.766		13.666	–
11	(Belgium) Liam De Smet	5.5	8.166		13.666	R2
12	(Finland) Robert Kirmes	4.9	8.633		13.633	R3

==== Vault ====
Rank	Gymnast	Vault 1				Vault 2				Total	Qual.
Rank	Gymnast	D Score	E Score	Pen.	Score 1	D Score	E Score	Pen.	Score 2	Total	Qual.
1	(United Kingdom) Jake Jarman	5.6	9.166		14.766	5.2	9.133		14.333	14.549	Q
2	(Armenia) Artur Davtyan	5.2	9.200		14.400	5.2	9.433		14.633	14.516	Q
3	(Ukraine) Nazar Chepurnyi	5.2	9.133	0.100	14.233	5.2	9.400		14.700	14.466	Q
4	(United Kingdom) Harry Hepworth	5.2	9.266		14.466	5.2	9.033		14.233	14.349	Q
5	(Italy) Nicola Bartolini	4.8	9.466		14.266	4.8	9.433	0.100	14.133	14.199	Q
6	(Norway) Sebastian Sponevik	5.2	9.066		14.266	4.8	9.066		13.866	14.066	Q
7	(Netherlands) Yazz Ramsahai	4.8	9.100		13.900	5.2	8.966		14.166	14.033	Q
8	(Cyprus) Neofytos Kyriakou	4.8	9.233		14.133	4.4	9.366		13.766	13.949	Q
9	(Turkey) Emirhan Kartin	4.8	9.066		13.866	5.2	8.800		14.000	13.933	R1
10	(Switzerland) Luca Murabito	5.2	8.966		14.166	4.8	8.966	0.100	13.666	13.916	R2
11	(Bulgaria) Kevin Penev	5.0	9.100		14.100	4.8	8.933		13.733	13.916	R3

==== Parallel bars ====
Rank	Gymnast	D Score	E Score	Pen.	Total	Qual.
1	(Turkey) Ferhat Arıcan	5.7	8.600		14.400	Q
2	(Switzerland) Ian Raubal	5.2	8.600		13.900	Q
3	(United Kingdom) Courtney Tulloch	5.1	8.633		13.833	Q
4	(France) Léo Saladino	5.3	8.433		13.833	Q
5	(Ukraine) Oleg Verniaiev	5.7	8.033		13.833	Q
6	(Germany) Timo Eder	4.9	8.800		13.800	Q
7	(Norway) Harald Wibye	5.1	8.700		13.800	Q
8	(Germany) Nils Dunkel	5.3	8.500		13.800	Q
9	(Hungary) Krisztofer Mészáros	5.5	8.300		13.800	R1
10	(Switzerland) Matteo Giubellini	5.2	8.566		13.766	R2
11	(Romania) Andrei Vasile Muntean	5.1	8.633		13.733	R3

==== Horizontal bar ====
Rank	Gymnast	D Score	E Score	Pen.	Total	Qual.
1	(Lithuania) Robert Tvorogal	5.4	8.566		14.066	Q
2	(Switzerland) Noe Seifert	5.7	8.266		13.966	Q
3	(France) Anthony Mansard	5.0	8.666		13.766	Q
4	(Cyprus) Marios Georgiou	5.3	8.466		13.766	Q
5	(Spain) Joel Plata	5.6	8.100		13.700	Q
6	(Germany) Andreas Toba	5.4	8.166		13.666	Q
7	(Turkey) Adem Asil	4.6	8.933		13.533	Q
8	(Hungary) Krisztofer Mészáros	5.2	8.233		13.433	Q
9	(Ukraine) Vladyslav Hryko	5.6	7.800		13.400	R1
10	(Belgium) Kilan Van Der Aa	4.8	8.566		13.366	R2
11	(Finland) Elias Koski	5.1	8.266		13.366	R3

=== Women's results ===
==== Individual all-around ====
Rank	Gymnast	Vault (gymnastics)	Uneven bars	Balance beam	Floor (gymnastics)	Total	Qual.
1	(Italy) Manila Esposito	12.633	13.666	14.300	13.800	54.399	Q
2	(Romania) Ana Bărbosu	13.333	13.400	13.600	13.600	53.933	Q
3	(Germany) Helen Kevric	13.700	14.766	13.100	12.366	53.932	Q
4	(Italy) Sofia Tonelli	13.366	13.400	13.566	13.000	53.332	Q
5	(Spain) Alba Petisco	13.666	12.866	13.266	13.233	53.031	Q
6	(Netherlands) Naomi Visser	12.500	13.966	13.066	12.566	52.098	Q
7	(France) Lorette Charpy	13.000	13.233	13.366	12.466	52.065	Q
8	(Germany) Karina Schönmaier	13.966	12.866	12.000	13.200	52.032	Q W
9	(Czech Republic) Vanesa Mašová	12.900	13.433	13.133	12.466	51.932	Q
10	(France) Morgane Osyssek-Reimer	12.933	12.466	13.733	12.766	51.898	Q
11	(Romania) Denisa Golgota	13.000	12.466	13.300	12.866	51.632	Q
12	(Israel) Lihie Raz	13.300	12.766	12.500	12.866	51.432	Q
13	(Hungary) Gréta Mayer	13.233	12.500	12.966	12.533	51.232	Q
14	(Finland) Kaia Tanskanen	13.133	12.533	12.566	12.900	51.132	Q
15	(United Kingdom) Ruby Evans	13.833	11.566	12.100	13.266	50.765	Q
16	(Finland) Maisa Kuusikko	13.366	13.700	11.666	11.866	50.598	Q
17	(Hungary) Zója Székely	12.666	13.566	12.733	11.333	50.298	Q
18	(Germany) Janoah Müller	12.533	12.700	12.900	12.133	50.266	– S
19	(Austria) Selina Kickinger	13.000	12.466	12.733	12.033	50.232	Q
20	(Belgium) Jade Vansteenkiste	13.033	12.700	11.400	12.733	49.866	Q
21	(Slovenia) Lucija Hribar	12.866	12.766	11.866	12.200	49.698	Q
22	(Israel) Yali Shoshani	12.866	12.733	10.900	12.866	49.365	Q
23	(Austria) Leni Bohle	12.866	11.666	12.500	12.333	49.365	Q
24	(Turkey) Nazlı Savranbaşı	12.200	12.600	12.133	12.300	49.233	Q
25	(France) Djenna Laroui	12.566	13.000	11.533	12.100	49.199	–
26	(Switzerland) Anny Wu	11.633	12.433	12.433	12.700	49.199	Q
27	(Netherlands) Floor Slooff	13.066	11.700	11.900	12.500	49.166	R1
28	(Czech Republic) Sona Artamonova	12.566	12.266	12.266	11.966	49.064	R2
29	(Romania) Lilia Cosman	12.800	11.400	12.166	12.600	48.966	–
30	(Sweden) Elina Gravin	13.066	11.900	11.800	12.200	48.966	R3

==== Vault ====
Rank	Gymnast	Vault 1				Vault 2				Total	Qual.
Rank	Gymnast	D Score	E Score	Pen.	Score 1	D Score	E Score	Pen.	Score 2	Total	Qual.
1	(Germany) Karina Schönmaier	5.0	8.966		13.966	4.8	8.600	0.100	13.300	13.833	Q
2	(Belgium) Lisa Vaelen	5.4	8.600		14.000	4.4	8.633		13.033	13.716	Q
3	(France) Ming Van Eijken	5.4	8.566		13.966	4.4	8.666		13.066	13.716	Q
4	(Bulgaria) Valentina Georgieva	5.0	9.000		14.000	4.4	8.900		13.300	13.650	Q
5	(Slovenia) Teja Belak	4.4	8.500		12.900	4.6	8.800		13.400	13.350	Q
6	(Netherlands) Elisabeth Geurts	5.0	8.933		13.933	3.8	8.466		12.266	13.299	Q
7	(Spain) Laia Font	5.0	8.600		13.600	4.4	8.500		12.900	13.250	Q
8	(Hungary) Gréta Mayer	4.4	8.833		13.233	4.6	8.666		13.266	13.249	Q
9	(Israel) Lihie Raz	5.0	8.300		13.300	4.4	8.566		12.966	13.133	R1
10	(Italy) Emma Fioravanti	4.4	8.833		13.233	4.4	8.333	0.100	12.633	13.133	R2
11	(United Kingdom) Ruby Stacey	4.6	8.866		13.466	3.6	8.666		12.266	13.066	R3

==== Uneven bars ====
Rank	Gymnast	D Score	E Score	Pen.	Total	Qual.
1	(Germany) Helen Kevric	6.4	8.366		14.766	Q
2	(Belgium) Nina Derwael	6.3	8.100		14.400	Q
3	(Netherlands) Naomi Visser	6.0	7.966		13.966	Q
4	(Finland) Maisa Kuusikko	6.1	7.600		13.700	Q
5	(Italy) Manila Esposito	5.7	7.966		13.666	Q
6	(Hungary) Zója Székely	6.0	7.566		13.566	Q
7	(Hungary) Bettina Lili Czifra	5.7	7.733		13.433	Q
7	(Czech Republic) Vanesa Mašová	5.7	7.733		13.433	Q
9	(Romania) Ana Bărbosu	5.9	7.500		13.400	R1
9	(Italy) Sofia Tonelli	5.9	7.500		13.400	R1
11	(Italy) Giulia Perotti	5.7	7.633		13.333	–
12	(Sweden) Nathalie Westlund	5.3	8.000		13.300	R3

==== Balance beam ====
Rank	Gymnast	D Score	E Score	Pen.	Total	Qual.
1	(Sweden) Jennifer Williams	6.4	8.133		14.533	Q
2	(Italy) Manila Esposito	5.9	8.400		14.300	Q
3	(France) Morgane Osyssek-Reimer	5.7	8.033		13.733	Q
4	(Romania) Ana Bărbosu	5.7	7.900		13.600	Q
5	(Italy) Sofia Tonelli	5.4	8.166		13.566	Q
6	(Belgium) Nina Derwael	5.3	8.166		13.466	Q
7	(France) Lorette Charpy	5.2	8.166		13.366	Q
8	(Romania) Denisa Golgotă	5.4	7.900		13.300	Q
9	(Spain) Alba Petisco	5.6	7.666		13.266	R1
10	(Czech Republic) Vanesa Mašová	5.2	7.933		13.133	R2
11	(Germany) Lea Marie Quaas	5.6	7.533		13.133	R3

==== Floor exercise ====
Rank	Gymnast	D Score	E Score	Pen.	Total	Qual.
1	(Italy) Manila Esposito	5.7	8.100		13.800	Q
2	(Romania) Ana Bărbosu	5.6	8.000		13.600	Q
3	(Sweden) Jennifer Williams	5.5	7.933		13.433	Q
4	(United Kingdom) Ruby Evans	5.4	7.866		13.266	Q
5	(Spain) Alba Petisco	5.4	7.833		13.233	Q
6	(Germany) Karina Schönmaier	5.1	8.100		13.200	Q
7	(France) Ming van Eijken	5.5	7.666		13.166	Q
8	(Italy) Emma Fioravanti	5.5	7.633		13.133	Q
9	(Italy) Sofia Tonelli	5.1	7.900		13.000	–
10	(Austria) Charlize Moerz	5.6	7.500	0.100	13.000	R1
11	(United Kingdom) Emily Roper	5.2	7.866	0.100	12.966	R2
12	(Finland) Kaia Tanskanen	5.1	7.800		12.900	R3
