= Daniel Giubellini =

Swiss gymnast (born 1969)

- Born: 19 August 1969 (age 57)
- Height: 1.65 m (5 ft 5 in)
- Relatives: Matteo Giubellini (son); Luca Giubellini (son)

Gymnastics career
- Discipline: Men's artistic gymnastics
- Country represented: Switzerland
- Gym: Turnverein Meilen
Medal record
Representing Switzerland
European Championships
Gold medal – first place	1990 Lausanne	Parallel bars

Daniel Giubellini (born 19 August 1969) is a Swiss gymnast. He competed in 1992 Summer Olympics.
