= Florian Langenegger =

Swiss gymnast

- Langenegger at the 2026 Swiss Cup

Personal information
- Born: 26 March 2003 (age 23) Bühler, Switzerland

Gymnastics career
- Discipline: Men's artistic gymnastics
- Country represented: Switzerland
- Club: STV Schlossrued
Medal record
Representing Switzerland
European Championships
Silver medal – second place	2025 Leipzig	Team
Bronze medal – third place	2026 Zagreb	Team

Florian Langenegger (born 26 March 2003) is a Swiss artistic gymnast. He competed at the 2022 and 2023 World Championships and represented Switzerland at the 2024 Summer Olympics.

== Early life ==
Langenegger was born in 2003 in Bühler and began gymnastics when he was seven years old.

== Gymnastics career ==
Langenegger finished seventh with the Swiss team at the 2019 European Youth Olympic Festival. He missed both the all-around and still rings finals due to the two-per-country rule.

Langenegger competed at the 2022 World Championships in Liverpool and helped the Swiss team finish 20th. He did not qualify for any individual finals. He competed with the Swiss team that placed fourth at the 2023 European Championships. He also qualified for the all-around final and finished seventh.

Langenegger was initially selected to be the Swiss team's alternate at the 2023 World Championships in Antwerp. However, Langenegger was moved onto the team after Benjamin Gischard sustained a knee injury. The Swiss team finished seventh during the qualification round and earned a team berth for the 2024 Olympic Games. Then in the team final, the Swiss team placed fifth which was the country's best finished at the World Artistic Gymnastics Championships since winning bronze in 1954. Individually, Langenegger qualified for the all-around final where he finished 14th. After the World Championships, he competed with Stefanie Siegenthaler at the 2023 Swiss Cup Zürich, and they placed tenth in the mixed-pair competition.

Langenegger won a gold medal on the vault at the 2024 DTB Pokal Stuttgart and finished fourth with the Swiss team. He was selected to compete at the 2024 Olympic Games alongside Luca Giubellini, Matteo Giubellini, Noe Seifert, and Taha Serhani.
