= Léo Saladino =

French artistic gymnast (born 2002)

- Saladino at the 2026 Swiss Cup

Personal information
- Born: 2 August 2002 (age 24) Grasse, France

Gymnastics career
- Discipline: Men's artistic gymnastics
- Country represented: France
- Training location: Paris, France
- Club: Pôle Antibes
- Gym: INSEP
- Head coach: Marc Touchais
Medal record
Men's artistic gymnastics
Representing France
European Championships
Silver medal – second place	2025 Leipzig	All-around
Mediterranean Games
Bronze medal – third place	2022 Oran	Team
FIG World Cup
Event / 1st / 2nd / 3rd; World Challenge Cup / 0 / 0 / 1

Léo Saladino (born 2 August 2002) is a French artistic gymnast. He is the 2025 European all-around silver medalist and the 2024 French all-around champion. He also won a team bronze medal at the 2022 Mediterranean Games.

== Gymnastics career ==
Saladino began gymnastics at the age of five.

=== Junior ===
In 2018, Saladino won a pommel horse gold medal at the Gymnasiade and placed seventh with the French team at the Junior European Championships.

Saladino placed third in the junior all-around at the 2019 French Championships. As a result, he was selected to compete at the 2019 Junior World Championships and placed 22nd in the all-around. He also advanced into the vault final, finishing seventh. He then competed with the French team that placed fifth at the 2019 European Youth Olympic Festival. Individually, he advanced to the all-around final and finished seventh. Additionally, he placed eighth in the floor exercise and pommel horse finals.

=== Senior ===
At the 2022 French Championships, Saladino won the all-around silver medal. He then competed with the French team that placed fifth at the 2022 European Championships. At the 2022 Mediterranean Games, he helped France win the team bronze medal.

Saladino won the all-around silver medal at the 2023 French Championships. He then helped the French team finish seventh at the 2023 European Championships, and he placed 16th in the all-around final. He won a silver medal on the vault at the Paris World Challenge Cup behind Harry Hepworth.

Saladino won the all-around title at the 2024 French Championships, where he also won silver medals in the rings and parallel bars. At the 2024 European Championships, he placed fifth in the floor exercise final. He competed at the 2024 Swiss Cup Zürich alongside Morgane Osyssek, and they became the first French pair to win the Swiss Cup.

At the 2025 European Championships, Saladino finished 18th in the all-around qualifications after multiple mistakes. He went on to win the all-around silver medal behind Turkey's Adem Asil. He became the first French gymnast to win an all-around medal at the European Men's Artistic Gymnastics Championships since Dimitri Karbanenko won silver in 1998. He also helped the French team place fifth.
