= Luca Giubellini =

Swiss artistic gymnast (born 2003)

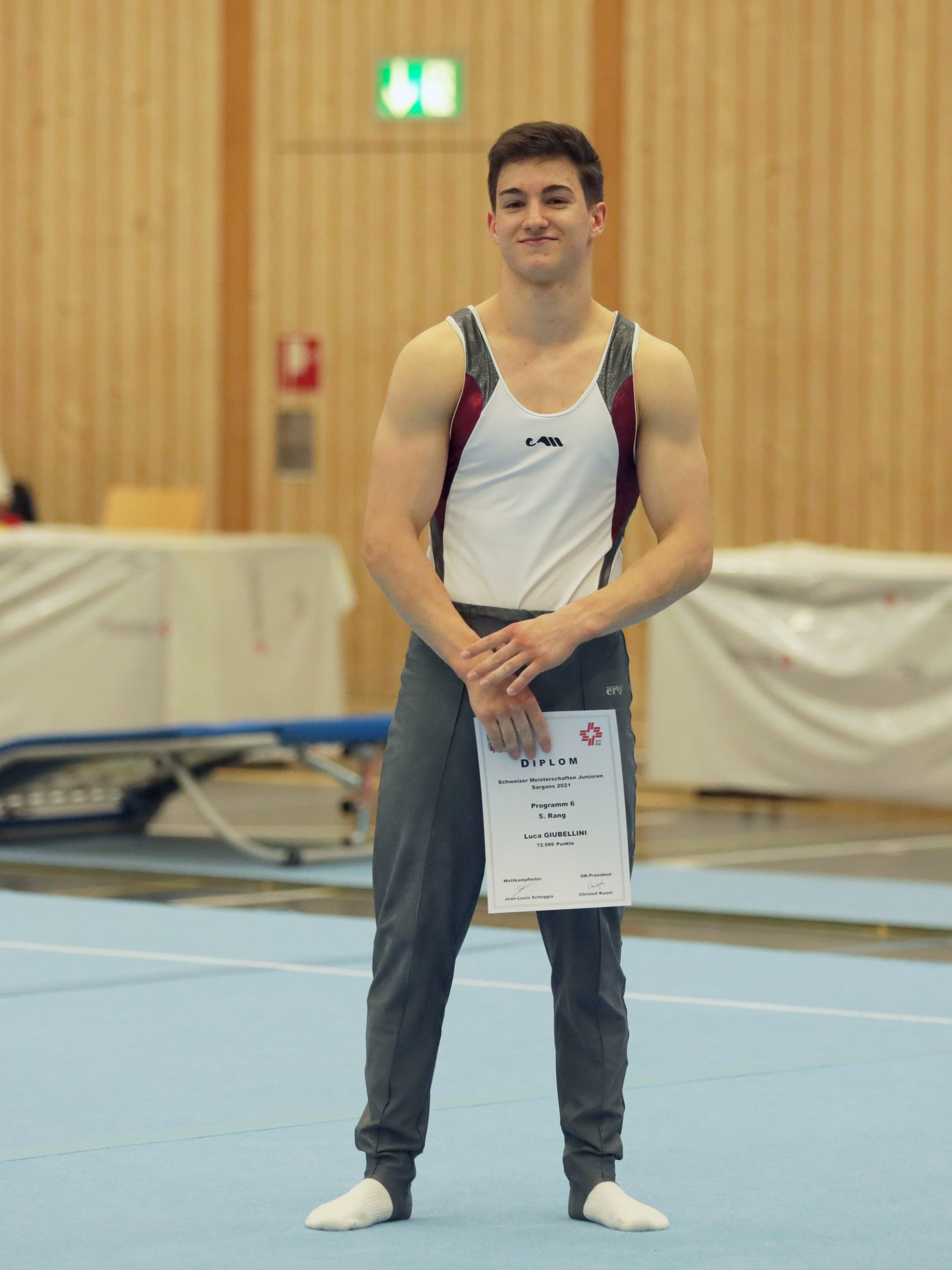
- Giubellini at the 2021 Swiss Junior Championships

Personal information
- Born: 1 April 2003 (age 23) Rebstein, Switzerland
- Relatives: Daniel Giubellini (father); Matteo Giubellini (brother)

Gymnastics career
- Discipline: Men's artistic gymnastics
- Country represented: Switzerland
- Training location: Magglingen, Switzerland
- Club: STV Eien-Kleindöttingen
Medal record
Representing Switzerland
European Championships
Silver medal – second place	2025 Leipzig	Team

Luca Giubellini (born 1 April 2003) is a Swiss artistic gymnast. He represented Switzerland at the 2024 Summer Olympics.

== Early life ==
Giubellini was born in 2003 in Rebstein. His father is Daniel Giubellini, a 1992 Olympian in gymnastics. His younger sibling Matteo is also a gymnast, and so is his youngest sibling, Elio.

== Gymnastics career ==
Giubellini competed at the 2023 European Championships and placed sixth in the vault final. He then won the silver medal in the all-around at the 2023 Swiss Championships. Then in the event finals, he won gold on the pommel horse, silver on the parallel bars and vault, and bronze on the floor exercise. He was then selected to compete at the 2023 World Championships. There, the Swiss team finished seventh during the qualification round and earned a team berth for the 2024 Olympic Games. Then in the team final, the Swiss team placed fifth which was the country's best finished at the World Artistic Gymnastics Championships since winning bronze in 1954.

Giubellini placed eighth in the vault final at the 2024 Osijek World Cup. He then competed at the 2024 European Championships alongside his brother Matteo, Christian Baumann, Noe Seifert, and Taha Serhani. The team qualified for the team final in fourth place, but they finished eighth in the final after several mistakes including Giubellini falling off the pommel horse. Individually, he qualified for the vault final and finished eighth after falling on his second vault.

Giubellini was selected to compete at the 2024 Olympic Games alongside Matteo Giubellini, Florian Langenegger, Noe Seifert, and Taha Serhani.
