= Matteo Giubellini =

Swiss gymnast (born 2004)

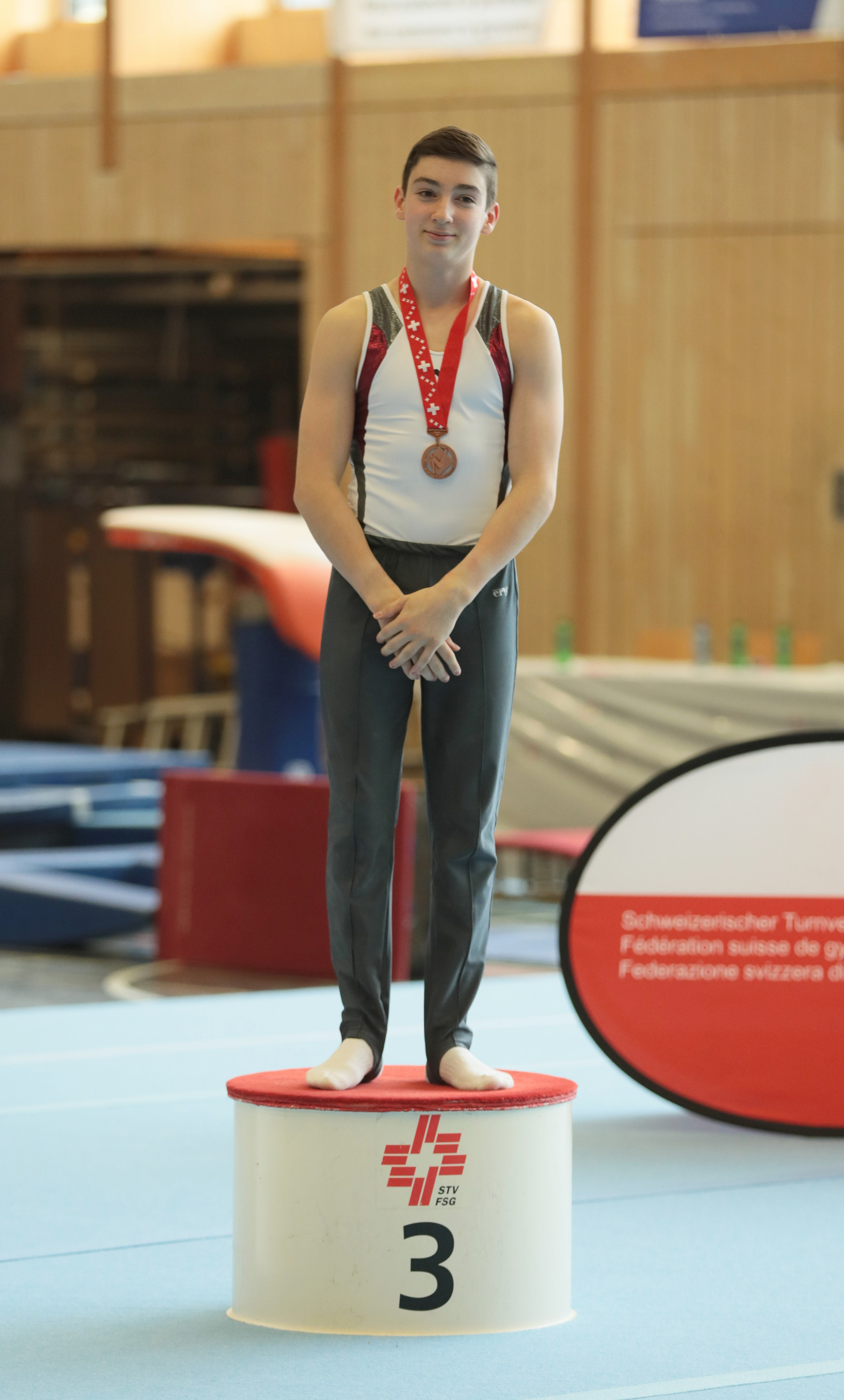
- Giubellini at the 2021 Swiss Junior Championships

Personal information
- Born: 7 November 2004 (age 21) Rebstein, Switzerland
- Relatives: Daniel Giubellini (father); Luca Giubellini (brother)

Gymnastics career
- Discipline: Men's artistic gymnastics
- Country represented: Switzerland
- Club: STV Eien-Kleindöttingen
Medal record
Representing Switzerland
European Championships
Silver medal – second place	2025 Leipzig	Team
Bronze medal – third place	2026 Zagreb	Team

Matteo Giubellini (born 7 November 2004) is a Swiss artistic gymnast. He represented Switzerland at the 2024 Summer Olympics.

== Early life ==
Giubellini was born in 2004 in Rebstein. His father, Daniel Giubellini, competed for Switzerland at the 1992 Olympics in gymnastics. His older brother Luca is also an elite gymnast, and he has a younger brother Elio.

== Gymnastics career ==
Giubellini competed at the 2022 European Youth Olympic Festival and won a bronze medal with the Swiss team. Individually, he won the bronze medal in the all-around behind Radomyr Stelmakh and Riccardo Villa. In the event final, he was placed fourth on the floor exercise and still rings, sixth on the vault, seventh on the pommel horse, and eighth on the parallel bars. He then competed at the 2022 Junior European Championships, helping the Swiss team to fourth place. Giubellini also got a fourth place in the individual all-around. He qualified for the horizontal bar final and finished fifth.

Giubellini made his World Cup debut at the 2023 Szombathely World Challenge Cup and finished fourth on the pommel horse, fifth on the horizontal bar, and eighth on the parallel bars.

Giubellini competed at the 2024 DTB Pokal Stuttgart and won gold medals on the floor exercise and pommel horse and a bronze medal on the parallel bars. He then competed at the 2024 European Championships alongside his brother Luca, Christian Baumann, Noe Seifert, and Taha Serhani. The team qualified for the team final in fourth place, but they finished eighth in the final after several mistakes. Individually, he qualified for the pommel horse final where he finished fourth.

Giubellini was selected to compete at the 2024 Olympic Games alongside his brother Luca, Florian Langenegger, Noe Seifert, and Taha Serhani.
