= Taha Serhani =

Swiss artistic gymnast

- Born: May 25, 1995 (age 31) Hutwill, Switzerland
- Height: 1.70 m (5 ft 7 in)

Gymnastics career
- Discipline: Men's artistic gymnastics
- Country represented: Switzerland
- Club: Kunstturnen Schaffhausen

Taha Serhani (born 27 May 1995) is a Swiss artistic gymnast.

== Personal life ==
Serhani was born to a Moroccan father and a Swiss mother. His brother, Samir, is also a gymnast who has competed internationally for Switzerland.

== Career ==
At the 2012 European Junior Championships, he was a part of the Swiss team that won bronze.

He made his senior international debut at the 2015 Cottbus World Cup in Germany. He competed at the 2015 European Games in Baku and helped the Swiss team finish 12th. He qualified for the individual all-around final and placed 9th with a score of 84.098.

He competed at his first senior European Championships at the 2017 edition in Cluj-Napoca, Romania. He finished 8th in qualification on the horizontal bar but was unable to progress to the final due to placing behind his teammates Oliver Hegi and Pablo Brägger.

The following year at the 2018 European Championships, he qualified for the horizontal bar and finished 4th. His score of 14.033 tied him for third place but he lost out in a tiebreak to Dávid Vecsernyés due a lower execution score. He was also a part of the Swiss team that finished 6th and contributed on four apparatuses during the final. He was later ruled out of the World Championships due to a meniscus tear in his left knee.

He competed at the 2019 European Championships in Szczecin, Poland and finished 12th on parallel bars and horizontal bar in qualification.

During 2020, Serhani was diagnosed with keratoconus, a condition in the eye which can cause blindness. This required him to have surgery on both of his eyes.

In 2021, he competed at his first World Championships but injured his shoulder late this year. This injury meant he missed the 2022 European Championships. However, he returned to the Swiss team for the World Championships in October.

In 2023, he competed at the DTB Pokal Team Challenge as a part of the Swiss team that finished 5th. He competed in three apparatus finals and won silver on both parallel bars and horizontal bar. At the 2023 World Championships, he helped Switzerland qualify a full team to the 2024 Olympics Games. They then finished 5th in the team final. He plans to retire after the 2024 Olympics and become a primary school teacher, planning to study at the Pädagogische Hochschule Luzern.
