= Yumin Abbadini =

Italian artistic gymnast

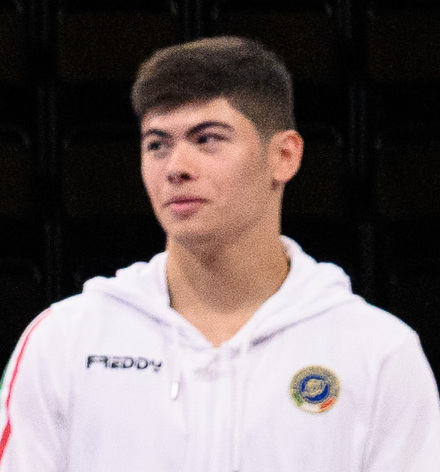
- Abbadini in 2022

Personal information
- Born: 6 May 2001 (age 25) Ranica, Bergamo, Italy
- Height: 1.70 m (5 ft 7 in)

Gymnastics career
- Discipline: Men's artistic gymnastics
- Country represented: Italy; (2018–present)
- Club: Pro Carate
- Head coaches: Alberto Busnari, Corrado Corti
Medal record
Men's artistic gymnastics
Representing Italy
European Championships
Gold medal – first place	2023 Antalya	Team
Silver medal – second place	2022 Munich	Team
Bronze medal – third place	2024 Rimini	Team
Bronze medal – third place	2024 Rimini	All-around
Bronze medal – third place	2025 Leipzig	Team
FIG World Cup
Event / 1st / 2nd / 3rd; World Challenge Cup / 0 / 0 / 1

Yumin Abbadini (born 6 May 2001) is an Italian artistic gymnast. He was a member of the Italian team that won its first-ever European Championships title in 2023. He also won a European team silver medal in 2022 and bronze in 2024. Individually, he is the 2024 European all-around bronze medalist and the 2022 Italian all-around champion. He represented Italy at the 2024 Summer Olympics.

== Early and personal life ==
Abbadini was born in Ranica on 6 May 2001 to an Italian father and a Chinese mother. He is in a relationship with Elisa Iorio, an Olympic and World medalist in gymnastics. As of 2024, he studies computer engineering at the University of Bergamo.

== Career ==
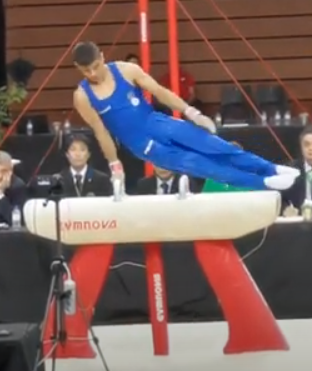
Abbadini competing pommel horse in 2019

Abbadini competed at the 2018 Junior European Championships and won a bronze medal with the Italian team. This was Italy's first medal at the Junior European Championships since 1992. He also placed 10th in the individual all-around, and he was the second reserve for the horizontal bar final.

Abbadini began competing in senior international competitions in 2019. He won a bronze medal on the pommel horse at the 2019 Guimarães World Challenge Cup.

=== 2022 ===
Abbadini competed at the 2022 DTB Pokal Stuttgart where the Italian men's team won the silver medal behind the United States. Individually, he won the bronze medal on the pommel horse behind Khoi Young and Benjamin Osberger. He also competed in the mixed cup, helping Italy win the bronze medal. He then competed at the European Championships and helped the Italian team win the silver medal behind Great Britain. Individually, Abbadini was the third reserve for the horizontal bar final. In October 2022, he won the all-around title at the Italian national championships.

Abbadini was selected to compete at the World Championships in Liverpool alongside Nicola Bartolini, Lorenzo Minh Casali, Carlo Macchini, and Matteo Levantesi. The team finished fourth by slightly more than one point behind the bronze-medalists, Great Britain, after Abbadini fell off the pommel horse in the final rotation. Individually, Abbadini qualified for the all-around final, where he finished 21st.

=== 2023 ===
At the 2023 European Championships, Abbadini won a team gold medal alongside Mario Macchiati, Lorenzo Minh Casali, Matteo Levantesi, and Marco Lodadio. This marked the first time Italy won a team title at the European Men's Artistic Gymnastics Championships. Abbadini also qualified for the all-around final and finished in sixth place. He also placed sixth in the pommel horse final.

At the World Championships, Abbadini and the Italian team placed sixth in the qualification round and earned a team berth for the 2024 Summer Olympics. This was the first time the Italian men's gymnastics team qualified for the Olympic Games since 2012. This result also meant they qualified for the team final, where Abbadini contributed on four apparatuses toward Italy's eighth-place finish. Individually, Abbadini qualified for the all-around final and finished in sixth place. After the World Championships, he competed at the 2023 Swiss Cup Zürich, a mixed pairs competition, with Manila Esposito, and they finished fourth.

=== 2024 ===
Abbadini began the 2024 Olympic season at the DTB Pokal Stuttgart and helped Italy win the team silver medal behind the United States. Individually, Abbadini won a silver medal on the horizontal bar and a bronze medal on the floor exercise. Then at the European Championships, Abbadini led the Italian team to a bronze medal finish. He also won the bronze medal in the individual all-around behind Marios Georgiou and Oleg Verniaiev. He finished seventh in the horizontal bar final.

Abbadini was selected to compete at the 2024 Summer Olympics alongside Nicola Bartolini, Lorenzo Minh Casali, Mario Macchiati, and Carlo Macchini. In the qualification round, the Italian team finished sixth and qualified for the team final. Abbadini also qualified for the all-around final in eighth place, and he was the first reserve for the horizontal bar final. The Italian team ultimately finished sixth in the team final. Then in the all-around final, Abbadini finished 11th.
