= Lorenzo Minh Casali =

Italian gymnast

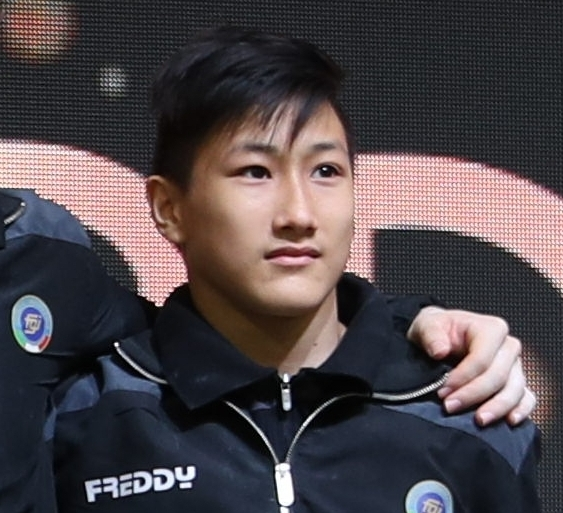
- Casali at the 2019 Junior World Championships

Personal information
- Full name: Lorenzo Minh Casali
- Born: 12 September 2002 (age 24) Hanoi, Vietnam

Gymnastics career
- Discipline: Men's artistic gymnastics
- Country represented: Italy; (2019–present)
- Club: Fiamme Oro
- Gym: Associazione Ginnastica Giovanile Ancona
- Head coach: Alberto Busnari
Medal record
Men's artistic gymnastics
Representing Italy
European Championships
Gold medal – first place	2023 Antalya	Team
Silver medal – second place	2022 Munich	Team
Bronze medal – third place	2024 Rimini	Team
Bronze medal – third place	2025 Leipzig	Team
Bronze medal – third place	2025 Leipzig	Mixed team
Bronze medal – third place	2025 Leipzig	Floor exercise
Mediterranean Games
Silver medal – second place	2022 Oran	Team
Junior World Championships
Bronze medal – third place	2019 Győr	Team
FIG World Cup
Event	1st	2nd	3rd
Apparatus World Cup	0	1	0
World Challenge Cup	1	0	0
Total	1	1	0

Lorenzo Minh Casali (born 12 September 2002) is an Italian artistic gymnast. He was part of the gold medal-winning team at the 2023 European Championships and is the 2024 Italian National Champion. He represented Italy at the 2024 Summer Olympics.

== Personal life ==
Casali was born in Hanoi in 2002. He spent the first five months of his life at an orphanage before being adopted by Stefano and Stefania Casali, an Italian couple.

== Junior gymnastics career ==
Casali was selected to represent Italy at the inaugural Junior World Championships alongside Lorenzo Bonicelli and Ivan Brunello. Together they won the bronze medal as a team. Individually Casali placed eighth in the all-around and fifth on floor exercise. He next competed at the 2019 European Youth Olympic Festival where he helped Italy once again win bronze.

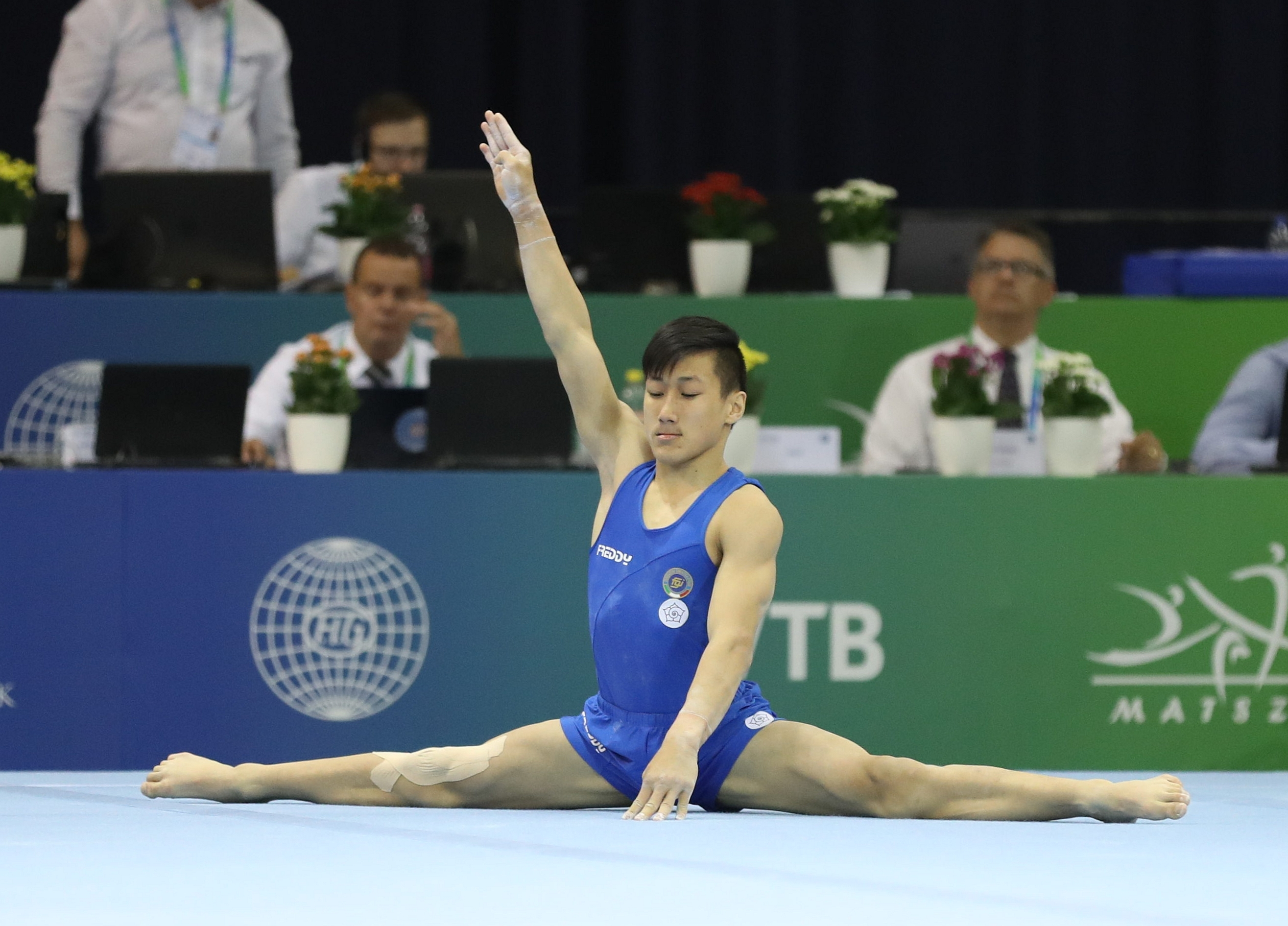
Floor exercise

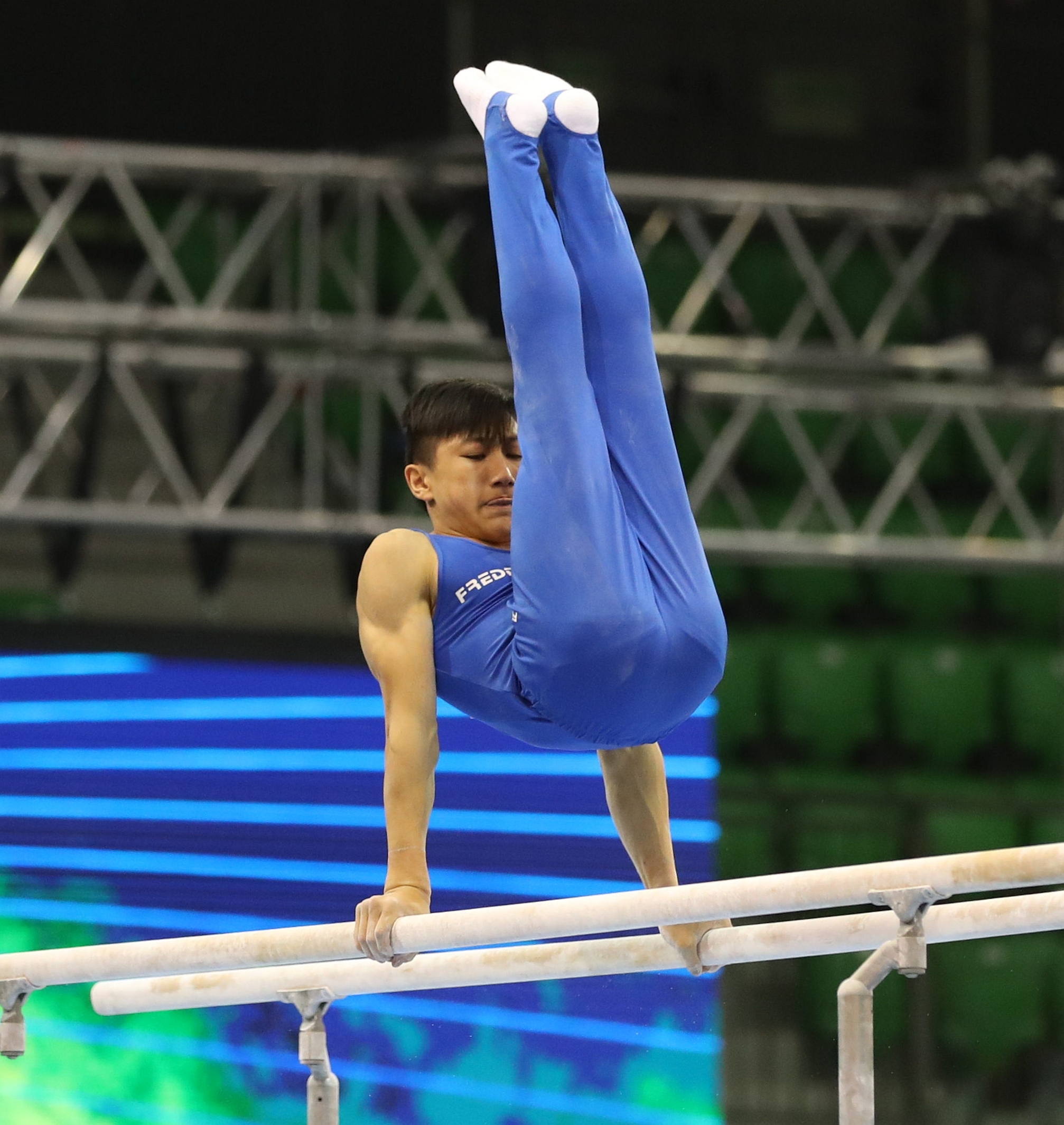
Parallel bars

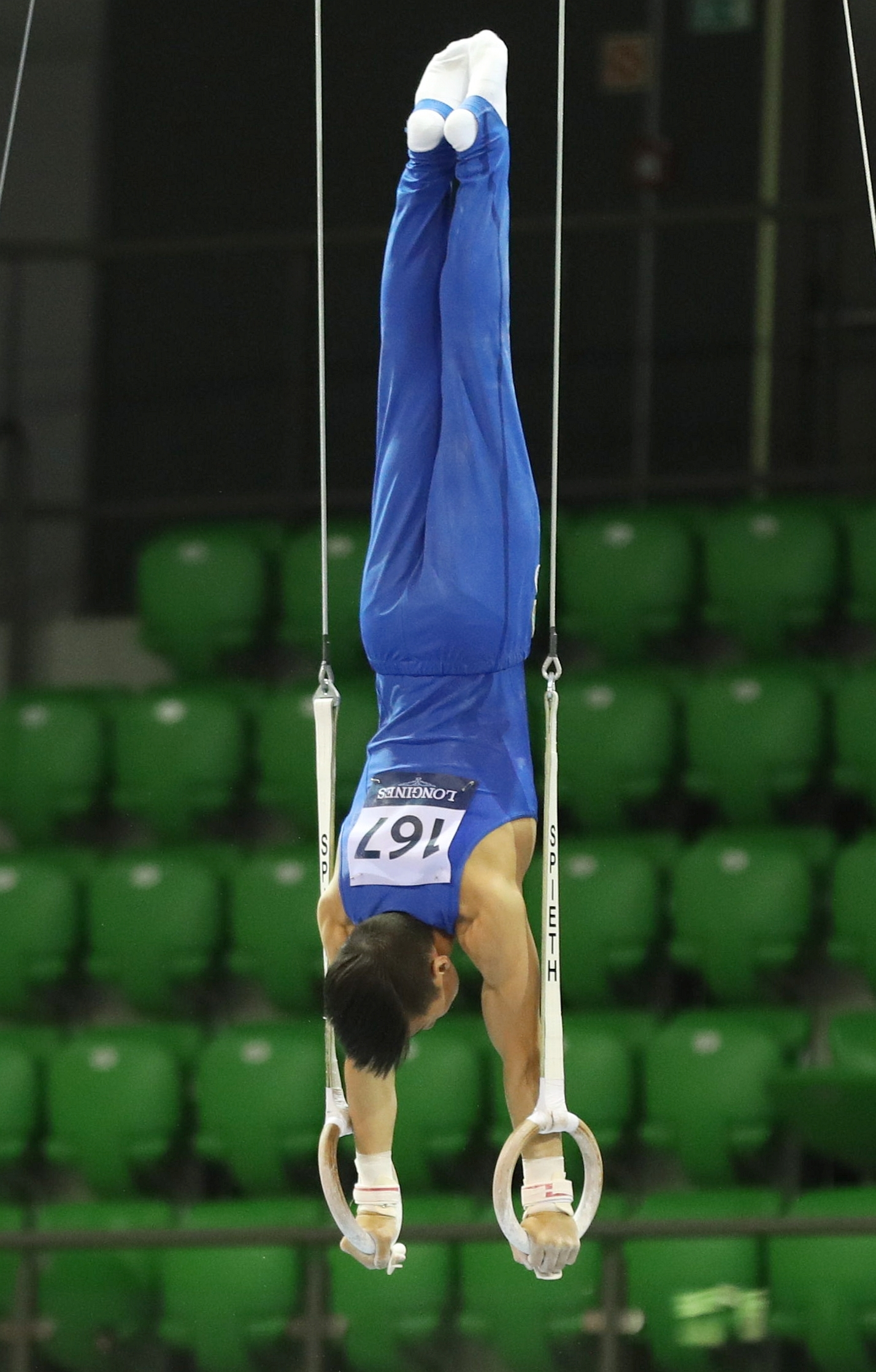
Rings

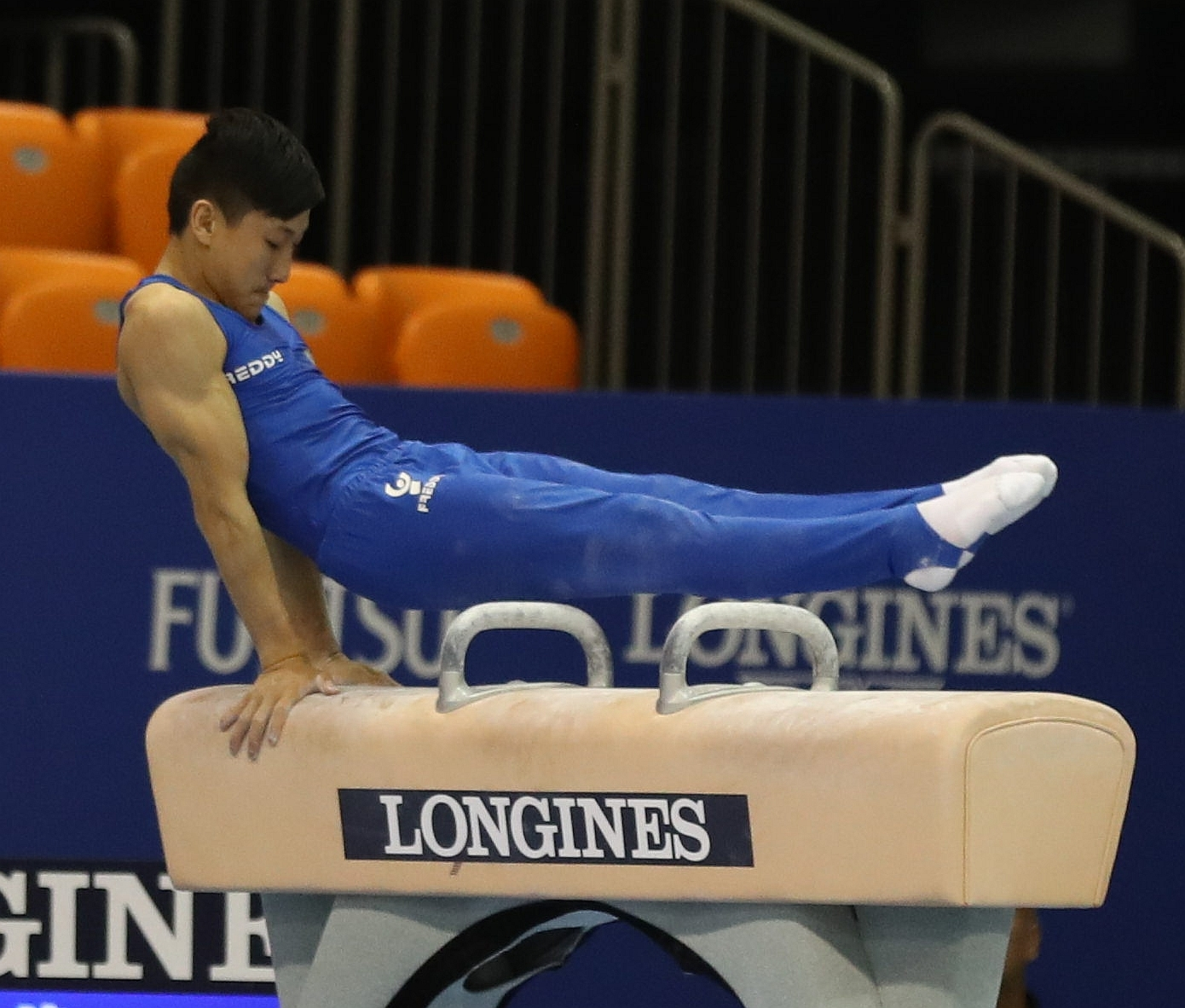
Pommel horse

Casali at the 2019 Junior World Championships

== Senior gymnastics career ==
=== 2021–2022 ===
Casali made his senior international debut at the 2021 European Championships; during qualifications he placed fourteenth in the all-around but did not qualify to the final due to compatriots Nicola Bartolini and Stefano Patron ranking higher. He next competed at the Koper World Challenge Cup, qualifying to the floor exercise and parallel bars finals. He finished eighth and fourth respectively.

Casali competed at the 2022 DTB Pokal Team Challenge and the 2022 European Championships, helping Italy win silver at both. Individually Casali placed seventh in the all-around at the European Championships.

Later that year Casali was selected to represent Italy at his first World Championships alongside Yumin Abbadini, Nicola Bartolini, Carlo Macchini, and Matteo Levantesi. The team finished fourth and individually Casali finished thirteenth in the all-around.

=== 2023–2024 ===
Casali competed at the 2023 European Championships alongside Yumin Abbadini, Matteo Levantesi, Marco Lodadio, and Mario Macchiati. Together they won Italy its first European team gold medal. At the 2023 World Championships Casali helped Italy finish eighth as a team. As a result, they qualified a full team to the Olympic Games for the first time since 2012.

Casali competed at the 2024 DTB Pokal Team Challenge where he helped Italy finish second behind the United States. The following month Casali competed at the European Championships where he helped Italy win bronze behind Ukraine and Great Britain.

In July of that year Casali competed at the Italian national championships. He won the all-around and was named Italian National Champion for the first time in his career. That same weekend he was selected to represent Italy at the 2024 Olympic Games alongside Yumin Abbadini, Nicola Bartolini, Mario Macchiati, and Carlo Macchini.

=== 2025 ===
Casali competed at the 2025 DTB Pokal Team Challenge where he helped Italy finish third. Although the all-around was not contested, he earned the third highest all-around score. During event finals he won silver on floor exercise behind Artem Dolgopyat, bronze on rings behind Wataru Tanigawa and Riley Loos, and placed fourth on parallel bars. Casali next competed at the Osijek World Cup where he won silver on parallel bars and placed seventh on horizontal bar.

Casali competed at the 2025 European Championships where he helped Italy win the bronze medal. He qualified to compete in the inaugural mixed team event alongside Manila Esposito; together they placed third behind Germany's Timo Eder and Karina Schönmaier and Great Britain's Jake Jarman and Ruby Evans. During event finals Casali won his first individual European medal, earning bronze on floor exercise.

=== 2026 ===
Casali competed at the 2026 Koper World Challenge Cup where he won gold on floor exercise.

== Competitive history ==
Competitive history of Lorenzo Minh Casali
Year	Event	Team	AA	FX	PH	SR	VT	PB	HB
2019	International Junior Team Cup	3rd place, bronze medalist(s)	18					7	
2019	Junior World Championships	3rd place, bronze medalist(s)	8	5					
2019	European Youth Olympic Festival	3rd place, bronze medalist(s)			6	6			
2019	Italian Championships		6					4	
2020	Italian Championships		8	4	8			2nd place, silver medalist(s)	5
2021
2021	European Championships							12	
2021	Italian Championships			4					
2021	Koper World Challenge Cup			8				4	
2021	Arthur Gander Memorial		7						
2022	DTB Pokal Team Challenge	2nd place, silver medalist(s)						3rd place, bronze medalist(s)	
2022	Mediterranean Games	2nd place, silver medalist(s)	5						
2022	European Championships	2nd place, silver medalist(s)	7						
2022	Italian Championships		2nd place, silver medalist(s)	2nd place, silver medalist(s)		4			
2022	World Championships	4	13						
2022	Arthur Gander Memorial		3rd place, bronze medalist(s)						
2023
2023	European Championships	1st place, gold medalist(s)	9						
2023	Italian Championships		3rd place, bronze medalist(s)	6		5		3rd place, bronze medalist(s)	
2023	World Championships	8							
2024	DTB Pokal Team Challenge	2nd place, silver medalist(s)							
2024	European Championships	3rd place, bronze medalist(s)							
2024	Troyes Friendly	1st place, gold medalist(s)							
2024	Italian Championships		1st place, gold medalist(s)						
2024	Olympic Games	6							
2025	DTB Pokal Team Challenge	3rd place, bronze medalist(s)		2nd place, silver medalist(s)		3rd place, bronze medalist(s)		4	
2025	Osijek World Cup							2nd place, silver medalist(s)	7
2025	European Championships	3rd place, bronze medalist(s)		3rd place, bronze medalist(s)					
2025	European Championships Mixed Team	3rd place, bronze medalist(s)	—N/a						
2026	Koper World Challenge Cup			1st place, gold medalist(s)		5			
2026	Italian Championships		8	2nd place, silver medalist(s)					
