= Carlo Macchini =

Italian artistic gymnast

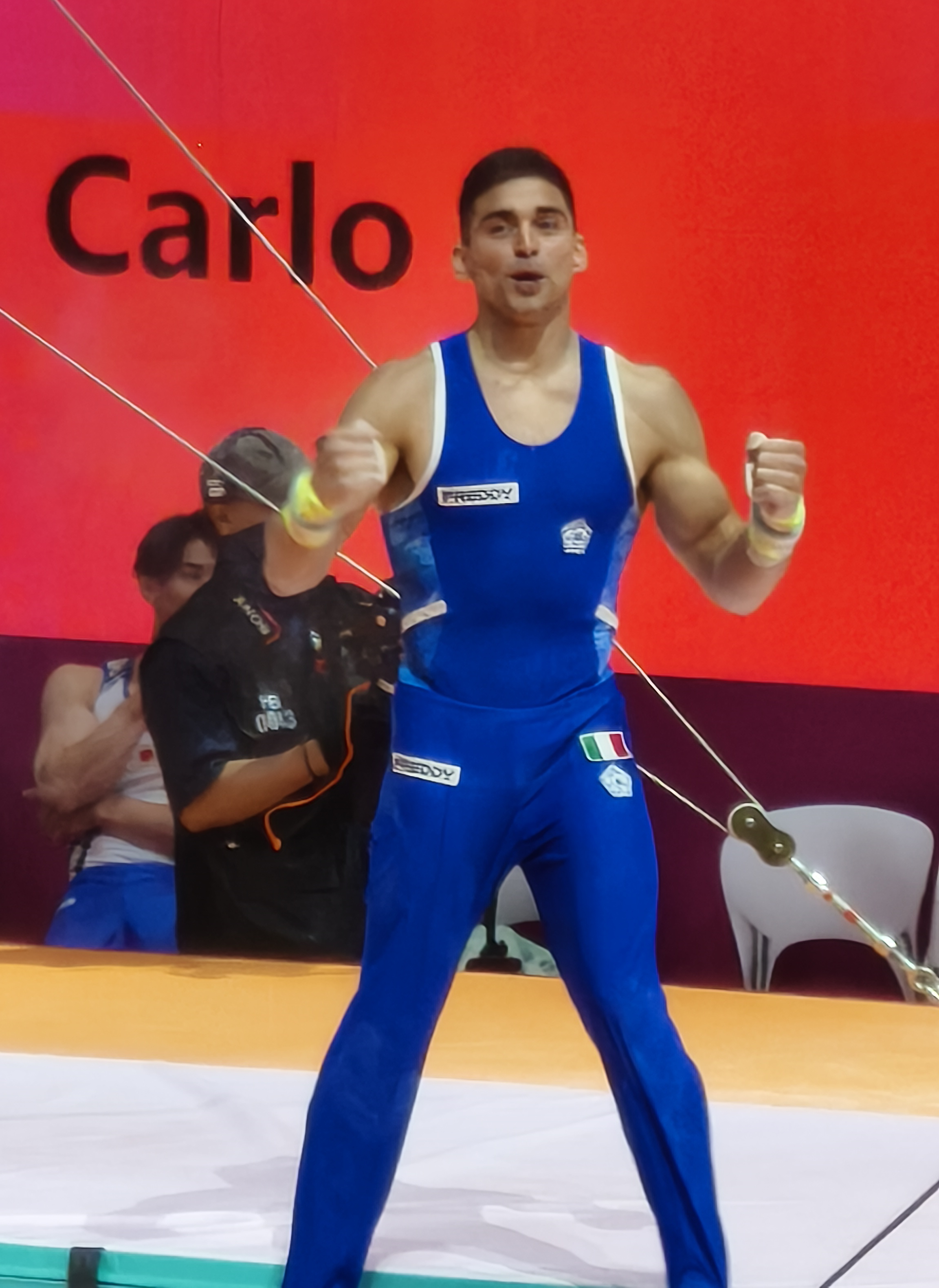
- Macchini at the 2025 World Championships

Personal information
- Nickname: Bistecca
- Born: 5 May 1996 (age 30) Ancona, Italy

Gymnastics career
- Discipline: Men's artistic gymnastics
- Country represented: Italy
- Club: GS Fiamme Oro
- Head coach: Marco Fortuna
Medal record
Men's artistic gymnastics
Representing Italy
European Championships
Silver medal – second place	2023 Antalya	Horizontal bar
FIG World Cup
Event	1st	2nd	3rd
Apparatus World Cup	1	1	0
World Challenge Cup	1	3	1
Total	2	4	1

Carlo Macchini (born 5 May 1996) is an Italian artistic gymnast. He is the 2023 European horizontal bar silver medalist. He represented Italy at the 2024 Summer Olympics.

== Early life ==
Macchini was born on 5 May 1996 in Ancona. When he was four years old, his parents signed him up for gymnastics because he was a hyperactive child.

== Career ==
Macchini won the gold medal on the horizontal bar at the 2013 European Youth Olympic Festival. At the 2017 Austrian Team Open, he won a gold medal with the Italian team and an all-around silver medal. He then competed at the 2017 European Championships and fell off his signature apparatus, the horizontal bar, twice and did not advance to any finals. He finished fourth on the horizontal bar at the 2017 Koper World Challenge Cup. He then finished eighth at the Szombathely World Challenge Cup after falling on his first release move.

Macchini finished seventh on the parallel bars at the 2018 Baku World Cup. Then at the Koper World Challenge Cup, he finished sixth on the parallel bars. He was selected to compete at the 2018 World Championships alongside Ludovico Edalli, Marco Lodadio, Andrea Russo, and Marco Sarrugerio, and they finished 14th in the qualification round. Then at the Cottbus World Cup, he finished eighth in the horizontal bar final after falling.

Macchini finished fourth on the horizontal bar at the 2019 Doha World Cup. He also finished fourth on the horizontal bar at the 2019 European Championships. He also reached the horizontal bar final at the 2019 European Games, finishing sixth. He competed with the Italian team that finished 13th in the qualification round of the 2019 World Championships. In 2020, he joined the Italian state police sports group, GS Fiamme Oro.

At the 2021 European Championships, Macchini finished fourth in the horizontal bar final. He won the silver medal on the horizontal bar at the 2021 Varna World Challenge Cup behind Tin Srbić. He finished fourth in the horizontal bar final at the 2021 World Championships despite receiving the same score as bronze-medalist Brody Malone because of the execution score tiebreaker.

Macchini finished sixth on the horizontal bar at the 2022 Baku World Cup. He then won his first FIG World Cup title at the Cairo World Cup. He then won the silver medal at the Koper World Challenge Cup behind Australia's Tyson Bull. He was selected to compete at the 2022 World Championships in Liverpool alongside Yumin Abbadini, Nicola Bartolini, Lorenzo Minh Casali, and Matteo Levantesi. The team finished fourth by slightly more than one point behind the bronze-medalists, Great Britain.

Macchini won the silver medal on the horizontal bar at the 2023 Cottbus World Cup. He then won the silver medal at the 2023 European Championships behind Tin Srbić.

Macchini finished seventh on the horizontal bar at the 2024 Baku World Cup. At the Koper World Challenge Cup, he won the bronze medal behind Tang Chia-hung and Tin Srbić. He was selected to compete at the 2024 Summer Olympics alongside Yumin Abbadini, Nicola Bartolini, Lorenzo Minh Casali, and Mario Macchiati. The team qualified for the team final, where they finished sixth.

== Competitive history ==
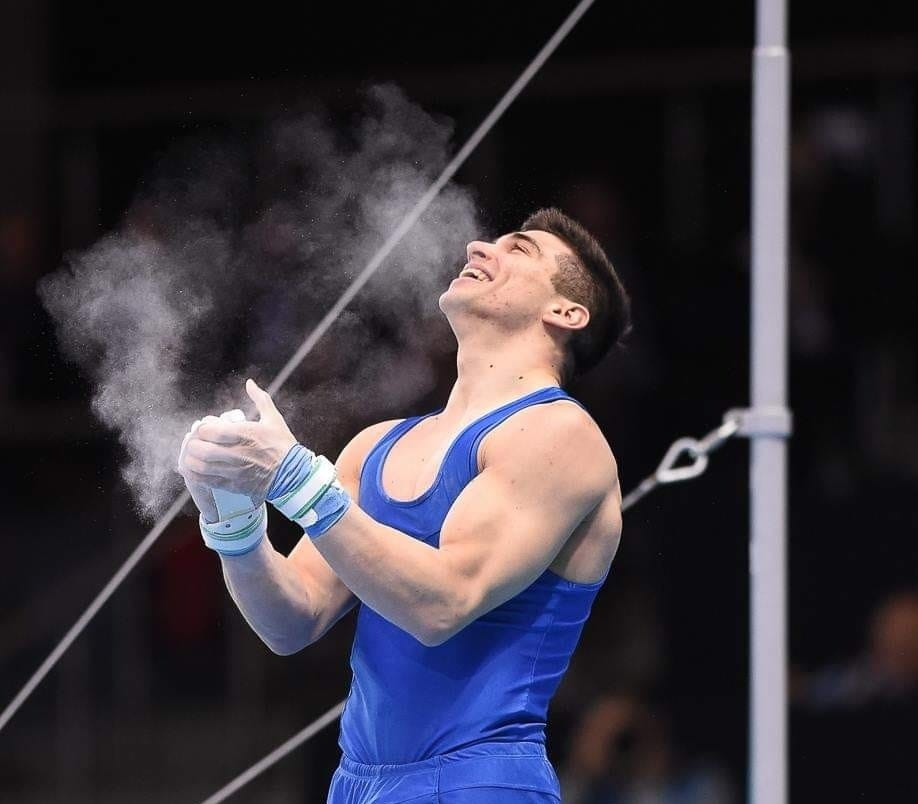
Macchini in 2020

Year	Event	Team	AA	FX	PH	SR	VT	PB	HB
Junior
2013	European Youth Olympic Festival								1st place, gold medalist(s)
Senior
2017	Austrian Team Open	1st place, gold medalist(s)	2nd place, silver medalist(s)						
2017	Koper World Challenge Cup								4
2017	Szombathely World Challenge Cup								8
2018	Baku World Cup							7	
2018	Koper World Challenge Cup							6	
2018	World Championships	14							
2018	Cottbus World Cup								8
2019	Doha World Cup								4
2019	European Championships								4
2019	European Games								6
2019	World Championships	13							
2021
2021	European Championships								4
2021	Varna World Challenge Cup								2nd place, silver medalist(s)
2021	World Championships								4
2022	Baku World Cup								6
2022	Cairo World Cup								1st place, gold medalist(s)
2022	Koper World Challenge Cup								2nd place, silver medalist(s)
2022	World Championships	4							
2023	Cottbus World Cup								2nd place, silver medalist(s)
2023	European Championships								2nd place, silver medalist(s)
2024	Baku World Cup								7
2024	Koper World Challenge Cup								3rd place, bronze medalist(s)
2024	Olympic Games	6							
2025	Paris World Challenge Cup								1st place, gold medalist(s)
2025	World Championships								6
2026	Paris World Challenge Cup								2nd place, silver medalist(s)
