= Mario Macchiati =

Italian artistic gymnast

- Born: 27 November 1999 (age 26) Fermo, Italy

Gymnastics career
- Discipline: Men's artistic gymnastics
- Country represented: Italy (2021–present)
- Club: Fiamme Oro
- Gym: Fermo 85
- Head coach: Giuseppe Cocciaro
Medal record
Men's artistic gymnastics
Representing Italy
European Championships
Gold medal – first place	2023 Antalya	Team
Bronze medal – third place	2024 Rimini	Team
Bronze medal – third place	2025 Leipzig	Team

Mario Macchiati (born 27 November 1999) is an Italian artistic gymnast. In 2023, he helped the Italian men's team win its first-ever European team title. He represented Italy at the 2024 Summer Olympics.

== Career ==
Macchiati won a bronze medal on the parallel bars at the 2021 Koper World Challenge Cup. He competed at the 2022 DTB Pokal Stuttgart and won a bronze medal with the Italian team in the mixed team competition. At the 2022 Koper World Challenge Cup, he placed fourth on the parallel bars, fifth on the horizontal bar, and seventh on the pommel horse.

Macchiati won a gold medal on the parallel bars at the 2023 DTB Pokal Stuttgart. He then placed fourth in the parallel bars final at the Cairo World Cup. At the 2023 European Championships, Macchiati won a team gold medal alongside Yumin Abbadini, Lorenzo Minh Casali, Matteo Levantesi, and Marco Lodadio. This marked the first time Italy won a team title at the European Men's Artistic Gymnastics Championships. He won the all-around title at the 2023 Italian Championships.

At the 2023 World Championships, Macchiati and the Italian team placed sixth in the qualification round and earned a team berth for the 2024 Summer Olympics. This was the first time the Italian men's gymnastics team qualified for the Olympic Games since 2012. This result also meant they qualified for the team final, where Macchiati contributed on five apparatuses toward Italy's eighth-place finish. Macchiati finished 22nd in the all-around during the qualification round, but he initially missed out on the all-around final due to the two-per-country rule. However, after teammate Lorenzo Minh Casali withdrew, Macchiati competed in the all-around final and placed 15th.

Macchiati and the Italian team won a silver medal behind the United States at the 2024 DTB Pokal Stuttgart. He then won a bronze medal in the team competition at the 2024 European Championships. He also qualified for the parallel bars event final, but he fell halfway through his routine and placed seventh. He was selected to compete at the 2024 Summer Olympics alongside Yumin Abbadini, Nicola Bartolini, Lorenzo Minh Casali, and Carlo Macchini. The team qualified for the team final, where they finished sixth.
