= Nicola Bartolini =

Italian artistic gymnast

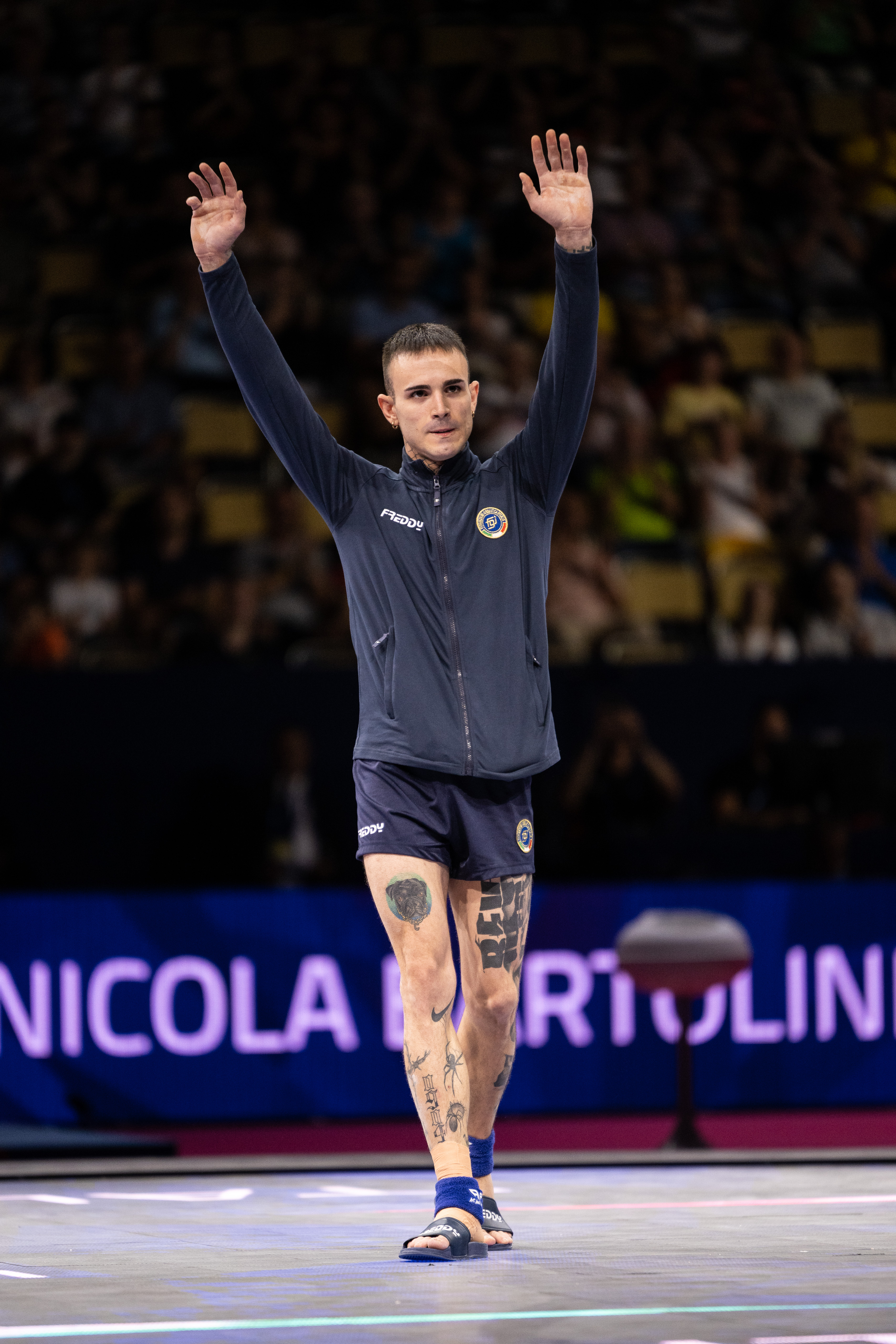
- Bartolini at the 2022 European Championships

Personal information
- Nicknames: Bart, Bartoleddu
- Born: 7 February 1996 (age 30) Cagliari
- Height: 170 cm (5 ft 7 in)

Gymnastics career
- Discipline: Men's artistic gymnastics
- Country represented: Italy (2014–present)
- Retired: July 26, 2026
Medal record
Men's artistic gymnastics
Representing Italy
World Championships
Gold medal – first place	2021 Kitakyushu	Floor exercise
European Championships
Silver medal – second place	2022 Munich	Team
Bronze medal – third place	2021 Basel	Floor exercise
Bronze medal – third place	2025 Leipzig	Team
Mediterranean Games
Gold medal – first place	2022 Oran	Floor exercise
Silver medal – second place	2022 Oran	Team
Silver medal – second place	2022 Oran	Vault
FIG World Cup
Event	1st	2nd	3rd
World Challenge Cup	0	0	2
Total	0	0	2

Nicola Bartolini (born 7 February 1996) is an Italian artistic gymnast. He is the 2021 World Champion and 2021 European bronze medalist on floor exercise. He represented Italy at the 2024 Summer Olympics.

== Gymnastics career ==
=== 2014–2018 ===
Bartolini competed at the 2014 European Championships in the junior division. He helped Italy finish fifth as a team and individually he finished eighth in the all-around and on floor exercise and fifth on vault.

Bartolini competed at the 2014 World Championships where he helped Italy finish 13th as a team during qualifications. He did not advance to any individual finals.

Between 2015 and 2018 he competed at the 2015 European Games, the 2015 World Championships, and two World Cups. In May 2016 Bartolini injured his shoulder and required immediate surgery.

=== 2019–2021 ===
Bartolini competed at the 2019 European Championships and finished eighth on floor exercise and sixth on vault. Later in the year he competed at the 2019 World Championships. The following month he underwent shoulder surgery for a second time.

He competed at the 2021 European Championships where he won the bronze medal on floor exercise. In October he won the gold medal on floor exercise at the 2021 World Championships, becoming the first Italian to do so.

=== 2022–2024 ===
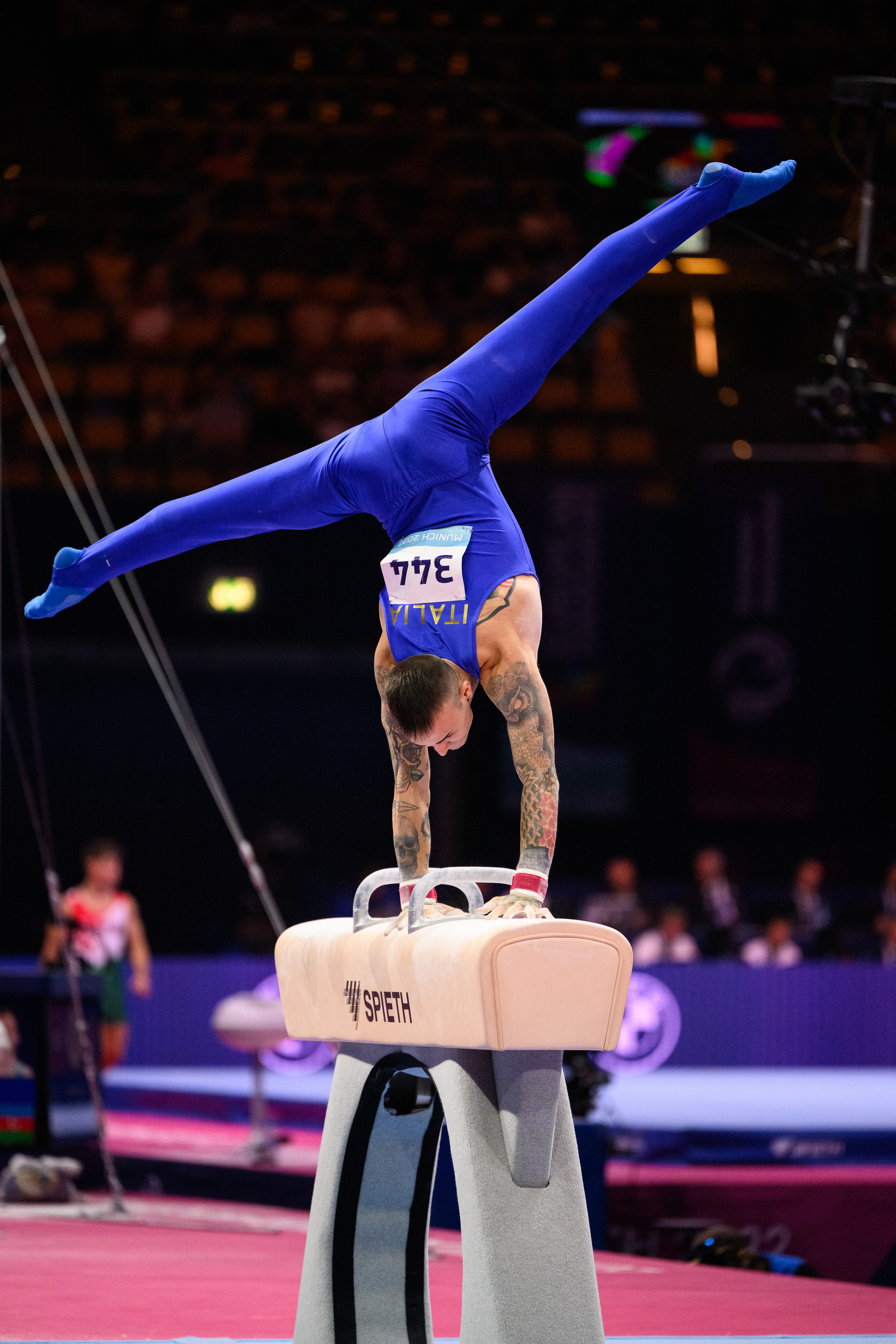
Bartolini at the 2022 European Championships

In August Bartolini competed at the 2022 European Championships, where he finished tenth in the all-around. Additionally, he qualified to the floor final in first place, and helped Italy qualify to the team final. During the team final he helped Italy win the silver medal behind Great Britain and he placed fourth on floor exercise. Bartolini next competed at the World Championships where he helped Italy finish in fourth place. Individually he placed fifth on floor exercise. Bartolini next competed at the 2022 Swiss Cup alongside Martina Maggio. They finished second behind the American duo of Yul Moldauer and Addison Fatta.

Bartolini competed at the 2023 World Championships, helping Italy qualify to the team finals where they finished eighth. As a result, Italy qualified a full team to the upcoming Olympic Games for the first time since 2012.

At the 2024 Italian National Championships Bartolini only competed on four events but won the title on floor exercise. That same weekend he was selected to represent Italy at the 2024 Olympic Games alongside Yumin Abbadini, Lorenzo Minh Casali, Mario Macchiati, and Carlo Macchini. At the 2024 Olympic Games Bartolini helped Italy qualify to the team final where they ultimately finished sixth.

=== 2025–2026 ===
Bartolini competed at the 2025 European Championships where he helped the Italian team win bronze. Individually he placed seventh on vault. On July 26, 2026, he announced his retirement from gymnastics.

== Competitive history ==
Year	Event	Team	AA	FX	PH	SR	VT	PB	HB
2014
2014	Junior European Championships	5	8	8			5		
2014	World Championships	13							
2015
2015	European Games	14							
2018	Osijek Challenge Cup			3rd place, bronze medalist(s)			3rd place, bronze medalist(s)	7	
2019
2019	European Championships			8			6		
2021
2021	European Championships		9	3rd place, bronze medalist(s)					
2021	World Championships			1st place, gold medalist(s)					
2022	DTB Pokal Team Challenge	2nd place, silver medalist(s)							
2022	Mediterranean Games	2nd place, silver medalist(s)	7	1st place, gold medalist(s)	4		2nd place, silver medalist(s)		
2022	European Championships	2nd place, silver medalist(s)	10	4					
2022	World Championships	4		5					
2022	Swiss Cup	2nd place, silver medalist(s)							
2023	Baku World Cup			4					
2023	World Championships	8							
2024	Troyes Friendly	1st place, gold medalist(s)		3rd place, bronze medalist(s)			3rd place, bronze medalist(s)		
2024	Italian Championships			1st place, gold medalist(s)					
2024	Olympic Games	6							
2025	Osijek World Cup						4		
2025	European Championships	3rd place, bronze medalist(s)					7		
