= Kerem Şener =

Turkish artistic gymnast

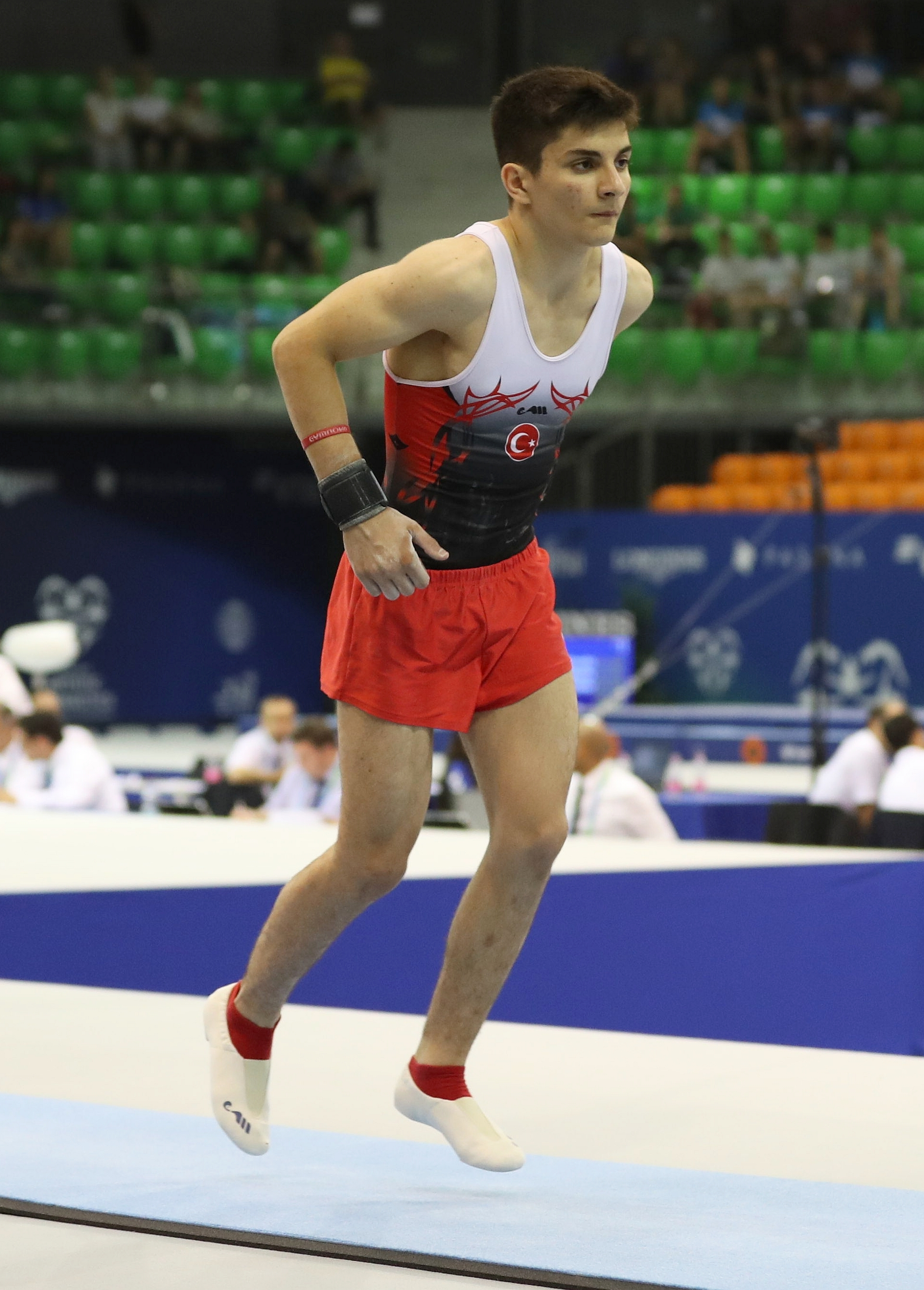
- Kerem Şener in the Vault event of the 2019 Junior World Artistic Gymnastics Championships.

Personal information
- Born: 2003 (age 22–23) Konak, İzmir, Turkey

Gymnastics career
- Discipline: Men's artistic gymnastics
- Country represented: Turkey (2018–present)
- Club: Şavkar Gymnastics SC
Medal record
Men's artistic gymnastics
Representing Turkey
European Championships
Silver medal – second place	2023 Antalya	Team
Bronze medal – third place	2022 Munich	Team

Kerem Şener (born 2003) is a Turkish male artistic gymnast and part of the national team. He is a member of Şavkar Gymnastics Sport Club in İzmir.

Şener won the gold medal in the Parallel bars event in the Junior category of the 4th Mediterranean Gymnastics Championship held in Cagliari, Italy on 27-29 September 2019. He became a gold medallist on parallel bars at the 2019 International Junior Team Cup held in Berlin, Germany on 5-6 April. He participated at the 2019 Junior World Artistic Gymnastics Championships in Győr, Hungary on 27-30 June 2019.

At the 2022 European Men's Artistic Gymnastics Championships in Munich, Germany on 18-21 August, he shared the bronze medal in the Team event with his teammates Ferhat Arıcan, Ahmet Önder, Adem Asil and Mehmet Ayberk Koşak.
