= 2022 European Men's Artistic Gymnastics Championships =

- Venue: Olympiahalle
- Location: Munich, Germany
- Start date: 18 August 2022
- End date: 21 August 2022
- Competitors: 288 from 38 nations

The 35th European Men's Artistic Gymnastics Championships was held from 18 to 21 August 2022 in Munich, Germany as part of the second multi-sport European Championships. There were 38 nations that sent athletes. Gymnasts from Russia and Belarus were banned due to the 2022 Russian invasion of Ukraine.

== Schedule ==
Date	Session	Time	Subdivisions
Thursday, 18 August
Thursday, 18 August	Senior All-Around Final and Qualification for Team & Individual Apparatus Finals	10:00 – 12:50	Subdivision 1
Thursday, 18 August	Senior All-Around Final and Qualification for Team & Individual Apparatus Finals	13:53 – 16:44	Subdivision 2
Thursday, 18 August	Senior All-Around Final and Qualification for Team & Individual Apparatus Finals	17:07 – 19:56	Subdivision 3
Friday, 19 August	Junior Team & All-Around Finals and Qualification for Individual Apparatus Finals	10:00 – 12:50	Subdivision 1
Friday, 19 August	Junior Team & All-Around Finals and Qualification for Individual Apparatus Finals	14:00 – 16:50	Subdivision 2
Friday, 19 August	Junior Team & All-Around Finals and Qualification for Individual Apparatus Finals	17:30 – 20:20	Subdivision 3
Saturday, 20 August	Senior Team Final	14:45 – 17:15	Top 8 from qualifications
Sunday, 21 August	Junior Individual Apparatus Finals	9:45 – 11:45	Floor, Pommel horse, Rings, Vault, Parallel bars, Horizontal bar
Sunday, 21 August	Senior Individual Apparatus Finals	14:00 – 17:30	Floor, Pommel horse, Rings, Vault, Parallel bars, Horizontal bar
All times listed in local time (UTC+01:00).

== Medals summary ==
=== Medalists ===
Event	Gold	Silver	Bronze
Senior
Team	(United Kingdom) Great Britain; James Hall; Joe Fraser; Jake Jarman; Courtney Tulloch; Giarnni Regini-Moran	Italy; Nicola Bartolini; Lorenzo Minh Casali; Andrea Cingolani; Matteo Levantesi; Yumin Abbadini	Turkey; Ferhat Arıcan; Kerem Şener; Ahmet Önder; Adem Asil; Mehmet Koşak
All-around	Joe Fraser; Great Britain	Ahmet Önder; Turkey	Adem Asil; Turkey
Floor	Artem Dolgopyat; Israel	Krisztofer Mészáros; Hungary	Jake Jarman; Great Britain
Pommel horse	Harutyun Merdinyan; Armenia	Loran de Munck; Netherlands	Nils Dunkel; Germany
Rings	Eleftherios Petrounias; Greece	Adem Asil; Turkey	Courtney Tulloch; Great Britain
Vault	Jake Jarman; Great Britain	Artur Davtyan; Armenia	Igor Radivilov; Ukraine
Parallel bars	Joe Fraser; Great Britain	Illia Kovtun; Ukraine	Giarnni Regini-Moran; Great Britain
Horizontal bar	Marios Georgiou; Cyprus	Robert Tvorogal; Lithuania	Joel Plata; Spain
Junior
Team	Italy; Tommaso Brugnami; Davide Oppizzio; Diego Vazzola; Riccardo Villa; Jacopo Zuliani	France; Axel Brèche; Romain Cavallaro; Nicolas Diez; Anthony Mansard; Lorenzo Sainte-Rose	(United Kingdom) Great Britain; Oakley Banks; Danny Crouch; Gabriel Langton; Jack Stanley; Reuben Ward
All-around	Botond Molnár; Hungary	Daniel Carrión; Spain	Reuben Ward; Great Britain
Floor	Daniel Mousichidis; Germany	Anthony Mansard; France	Tommaso Brugnami; Italy
Pommel horse	Riccardo Villa; Italy	Hamlet Manukyan; Armenia	Dachi Dolidze; Georgia
Rings	Luis Il-Sung Melander; Sweden	Hamlet Manukyan; Armenia	Jukka Ole Nissinen; Germany
Vault	Joona Reiman; Finland	Sebastian Sponevik; Norway	Botond Molnár; Hungary
Parallel bars	Erik Baghdasaryan; Armenia	Gabriel Langton; Great Britain	Daniel Carrion Caro; Spain
Horizontal bar	Dmytro Dotsenko; Israel	Jukka Ole Nissinen; Germany	Daniel Mousichidis; Germany

=== Medal standings ===
==== Overall ====
Rank	Nation	Gold	Silver	Bronze	Total
1	Great Britain	4	1	5	10
2	Armenia	2	3	0	5
3	Italy	2	1	1	4
4	Israel	2	0	0	2
5	Germany	1	1	3	5
6	Hungary	1	1	1	3
7	Cyprus	1	0	0	1
7	Finland	1	0	0	1
7	Greece	1	0	0	1
7	Sweden	1	0	0	1
11	Turkey	0	2	2	4
12	France	0	2	0	2
13	Spain	0	1	2	3
14	Ukraine	0	1	1	2
15	Lithuania	0	1	0	1
15	Netherlands	0	1	0	1
15	Norway	0	1	0	1
18	Georgia	0	0	1	1
Totals (18 entries)		16	16	16	48

==== Senior ====
Rank	Nation	Gold	Silver	Bronze	Total
1	Great Britain	4	0	3	7
2	Armenia	1	1	0	2
3	Cyprus	1	0	0	1
3	Greece	1	0	0	1
3	Israel	1	0	0	1
6	Turkey	0	2	2	4
7	Ukraine	0	1	1	2
8	Hungary	0	1	0	1
8	Italy	0	1	0	1
8	Lithuania	0	1	0	1
8	Netherlands	0	1	0	1
12	Germany	0	0	1	1
12	Spain	0	0	1	1
Totals (13 entries)		8	8	8	24

==== Junior ====
Rank	Nation	Gold	Silver	Bronze	Total
1	Italy	2	0	1	3
2	Armenia	1	2	0	3
3	Germany	1	1	2	4
4	Hungary	1	0	1	2
5	Finland	1	0	0	1
5	Israel	1	0	0	1
5	Sweden	1	0	0	1
8	France	0	2	0	2
9	Great Britain	0	1	2	3
10	Spain	0	1	1	2
11	Norway	0	1	0	1
12	Georgia	0	0	1	1
Totals (12 entries)		8	8	8	24

== Senior results ==
=== Team ===
Oldest and youngest competitors

	Name	Country	Date of birth	Age
Youngest	Kerem Şener	Turkey	19 August 2003	19 years and 1 day
Oldest	Andrea Cingolani	Italy	14 August 1990	32 years and 6 days

Rank	Team	Floor (gymnastics)	Pommel horse	Rings (gymnastics)	Vault (gymnastics)	Parallel bars	Horizontal bar	Total
1st place, gold medalist(s)	Great Britain	42.433 (1)	41.465 (2)	42.166 (2)	44.700 (1)	42.599 (1)	40.932 (1)	254.295
1st place, gold medalist(s)	James Hall		13.766	13.433		14.300	14.066	254.295
1st place, gold medalist(s)	Joe Fraser	13.700	14.433	14.100		15.166	13.900	254.295
1st place, gold medalist(s)	Jake Jarman	14.500	13.266		15.200		12.966	254.295
1st place, gold medalist(s)	Courtney Tulloch			14.633	14.600			254.295
1st place, gold medalist(s)	Giarnni Regini-Moran	14.233			14.900	13.133		254.295
2nd place, silver medalist(s)	Italy	42.166 (2)	40.299 (4)	40.398 (3)	42.700 (4)	42.166 (=4)	39.765 (4)	247.494
2nd place, silver medalist(s)	Nicola Bartolini	14.433	13.366		14.500	13.733	12.666	247.494
2nd place, silver medalist(s)	Lorenzo Minh Casali	13.833		13.566	14.500	13.833		247.494
2nd place, silver medalist(s)	Andrea Cingolani			13.466				247.494
2nd place, silver medalist(s)	Matteo Levantesi		13.100		13.700	14.600	13.333	247.494
2nd place, silver medalist(s)	Yumin Abbadini	13.900	13.833	13.366			13.766	247.494
3rd place, bronze medalist(s)	Turkey	40.799 (6)	38.632 (7)	42.499 (1)	43.433 (2)	41.599 (=6)	39.200 (6)	246.162
3rd place, bronze medalist(s)	Ferhat Arıcan		14.266		14.200	15.200	12.700	246.162
3rd place, bronze medalist(s)	Kerem Şener							246.162
3rd place, bronze medalist(s)	Ahmet Önder	14.233	12.333	13.666	14.000	12.533	12.600	246.162
3rd place, bronze medalist(s)	Adem Asil	13.900	12.033	14.800	15.233	13.866	13.900	246.162
3rd place, bronze medalist(s)	Mehmet Koşak	12.666		14.033				246.162
4	Switzerland	40.965 (5)	39.366 (6)	39.566 (6)	41.932 (7)	42.166 (=4)	39.999 (3)	243.994
4	Noè Seifert	13.866	12.466	13.366	14.066	14.733	14.000	243.994
4	Andrin Frey	13.166	13.200		13.400			243.994
4	Moreno Kratter	13.933			14.466		13.533	243.994
4	Marco Pfyl			13.100		13.333	12.466	243.994
4	Dominic Tamsel		13.700	13.100		14.100		243.994
5	France	41.266 (4)	39.798 (5)	39.532 (7)	41.899 (8)	42.532 (2)	38.765 (7)	243.792
5	Benjamin Osberger	14.166	13.166		13.266			243.792
5	Leo Saladino	13.500	13.166	13.433	14.300	14.033	12.466	243.792
5	Paul Degouy	13.600		12.866	14.333	13.766	13.333	243.792
5	Cameron-Lie Bernard			13.233		14.733		243.792
5	Julien Saleur		13.466				12.966	243.792
6	Hungary	41.699 (3)	40.599 (3)	39.999 (5)	41.965 (6)	41.599 (=6)	37.666 (8)	243.527
6	Krisztofer Mészáros	14.433	14.066	13.100	14.266	13.766	13.500	243.527
6	Krisztián Balázs	13.166	13.100			13.833	13.866	243.527
6	Benedek Tomcsányi		13.433	13.533	13.833			243.527
6	Botond Kardos	14.100			13.866	14.000	10.300	243.527
6	Balazs Kiss			13.366				243.527
7	Germany	35.999 (8)	41.765 (1)	38.632 (8)	42.532 (3)	42.365 (3)	40.066 (2)	241.359
7	Lukas Dauser	13.733		13.066	13.966	15.533	13.300	241.359
7	Nils Dunkel		14.466	12.000		14.066		241.359
7	Glenn Trebing	10.900	13.633			12.766		241.359
7	Andreas Toba		13.666	13.566	14.066		13.266	241.359
7	Lucas Kochan	11.366			14.500		13.500	241.359
8	Spain	40.566 (7)	37.166 (8)	40.065 (4)	42.166 (5)	40.832 (8)	39.599 (5)	240.394
8	Rayderley Zapata	12.833		13.266	13.600			240.394
8	Joel Plata	13.933	12.200	13.166	14.333		13.166	240.394
8	Néstor Abad			13.633		14.066	13.400	240.394
8	Nicolau Mir	13.800	11.333		14.233	12.933	13.033	240.394
8	Thierno Diallo		13.633			13.833		240.394

=== All-around ===
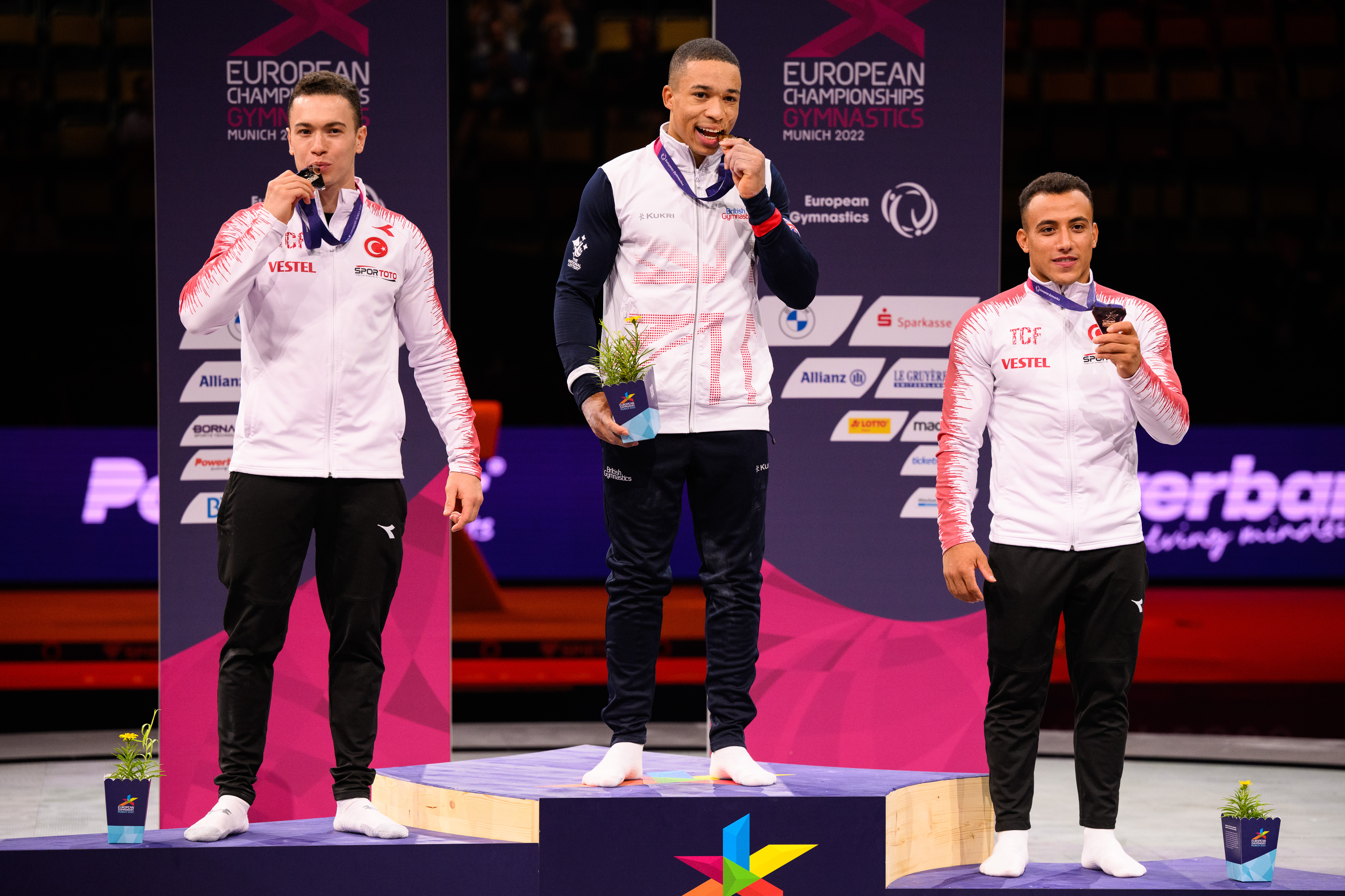
🥇 Joe Fraser 🥈 Ahmet Önder 🥉 Adem Asil

76 gymnasts took part in the individual all-around competition with no prior qualification round. The following is the top 10 of the all-around.

Position	Gymnast	Floor (gymnastics)	Pommel horse	Rings (gymnastics)	Vault (gymnastics)	Parallel bars	Horizontal bar	Total
1st place, gold medalist(s)	Joe Fraser (GBR)	13.633	14.600	14.266	14.300	15.066	13.700	85.565
2nd place, silver medalist(s)	Ahmet Önder (TUR)	14.266	13.500	13.933	14.533	14.666	14.233	85.131
3rd place, bronze medalist(s)	Adem Asil (TUR)	14.266	13.300	14.933	15.200	14.133	12.633	84.465
4	Joel Plata (ESP)	14.033	13.566	13.433	14.766	13.933	14.000	83.731
5	Noe Seifert (SUI)	13.933	13.666	13.600	14.066	13.633	14.133	83.031
6	Krisztofer Mészáros (HUN)	14.500	13.233	13.033	14.400	14.233	13.600	82.999
7	Lorenzo Minh Casali (ITA)	14.200	12.833	13.500	14.466	14.166	13.366	82.531
8	Jake Jarman (GBR)	14.466	13.033	12.800	14.833	14.133	13.200	82.465
9	Lukas Dauser (GER)	13.766	13.166	13.333	13.633	14.766	13.500	82.164
10	Nicola Bartolini (ITA)	14.500	13.566	12.833	14.300	13.633	12.266	82.098

=== Floor ===
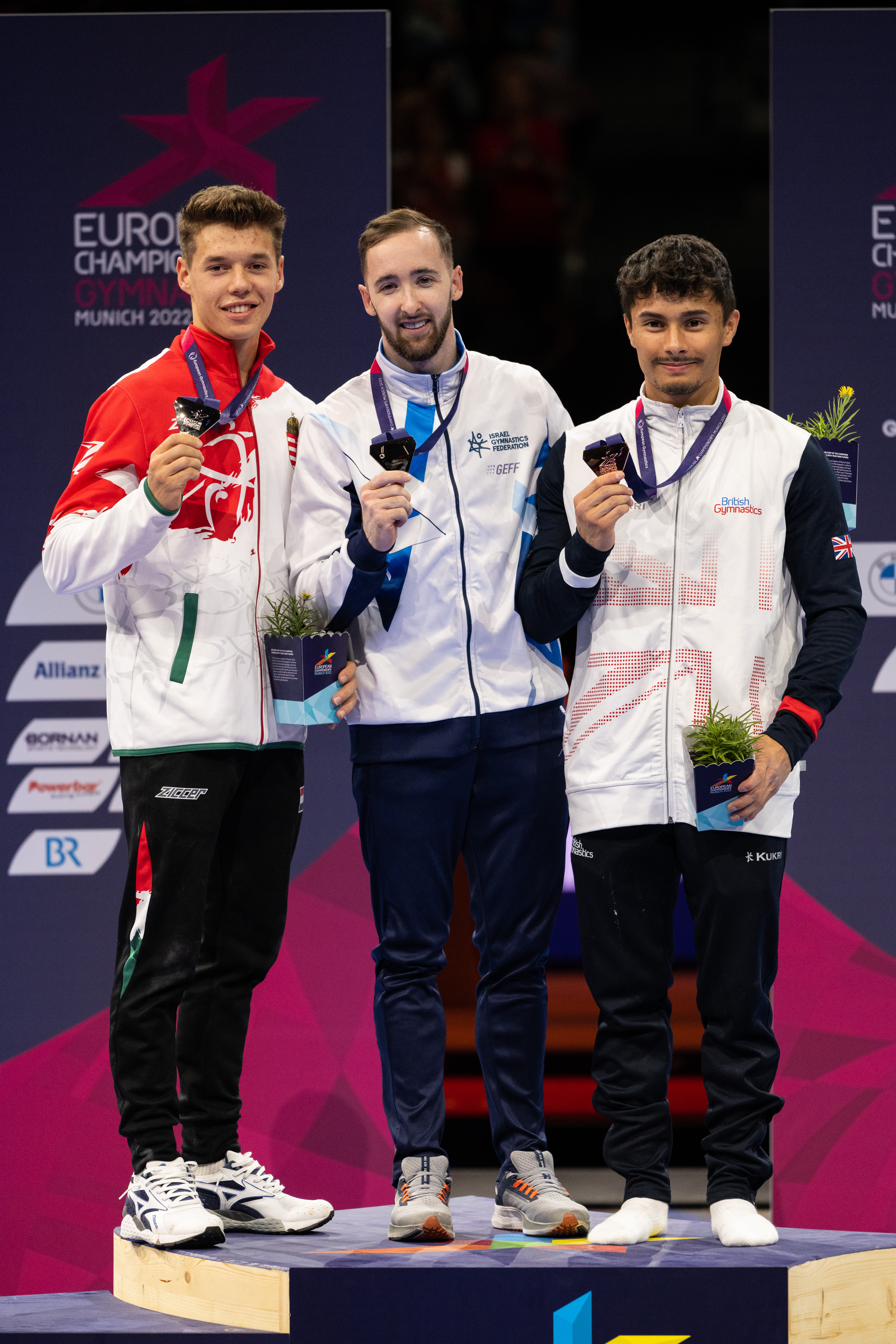
🥇 Artem Dolgopyat 🥈 Krisztofer Mészáros 🥉 Jake Jarman

Oldest and youngest competitors

	Name	Country	Date of birth	Age
Youngest	Illia Kovtun	Ukraine	10 August 2003	19 years and 11 days
Oldest	Nicola Bartolini	Italy	7 February 1996	26 years, 6 months and 14 days

Position	Gymnast	D Score	E Score	Penalty	Total
1st place, gold medalist(s)	(Israel) Artem Dolgopyat	6.1	8.866		14.966
2nd place, silver medalist(s)	(Hungary) Krisztofer Mészáros	6.0	8.600		14.600
3rd place, bronze medalist(s)	(United Kingdom) Jake Jarman	6.3	8.133		14.433
4	(Italy) Nicola Bartolini	5.9	8.400		14.300
5	(Ukraine) Illia Kovtun	6.1	8.133		14.233
6	(Turkey) Adem Asil	5.8	7.866	0.300	13.366
7	(United Kingdom) Giarnni Regini-Moran	5.9	7.033		12.933
8	(Turkey) Ahmet Önder	5.8	7.033		12.833

=== Pommel horse ===
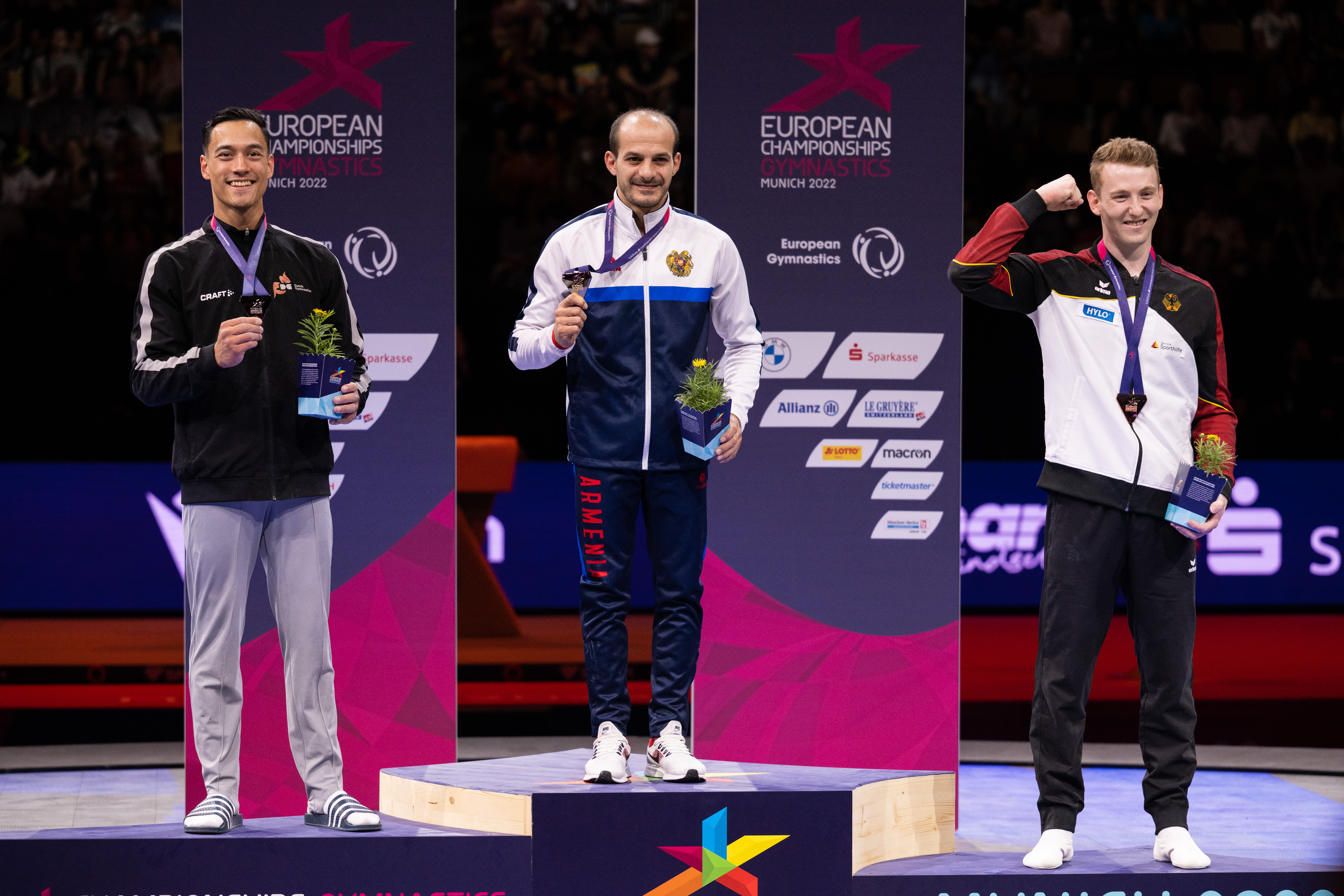
🥇 Harutyun Merdinyan 🥈 Loran de Munck 🥉 Nils Dunkel

Oldest and youngest competitors

	Name	Country	Date of birth	Age
Youngest	Benjamin Osberger	France	1 October 2001	20 years, 10 months and 20 days
Oldest	Harutyun Merdinyan	Armenia	16 August 1984	38 years and 5 days

Position	Gymnast	D Score	E Score	Penalty	Total
1st place, gold medalist(s)	(Armenia) Harutyun Merdinyan	6.1	8.633		14.733
2nd place, silver medalist(s)	(Netherlands) Loran de Munck	6.3	8.400		14.700
3rd place, bronze medalist(s)	(Germany) Nils Dunkel	6.1	8.533		14.633
4	(France) Benjamin Osberger	5.8	8.766		14.566
5	(Turkey) Ferhat Arıcan	5.8	8.466		14.266
6	(Armenia) Artur Davtyan	5.7	8.333		14.033
7	(Croatia) Filip Ude	5.4	8.533		13.933
8	(United Kingdom) Joe Fraser	5.8	8.100		13.900

=== Rings ===
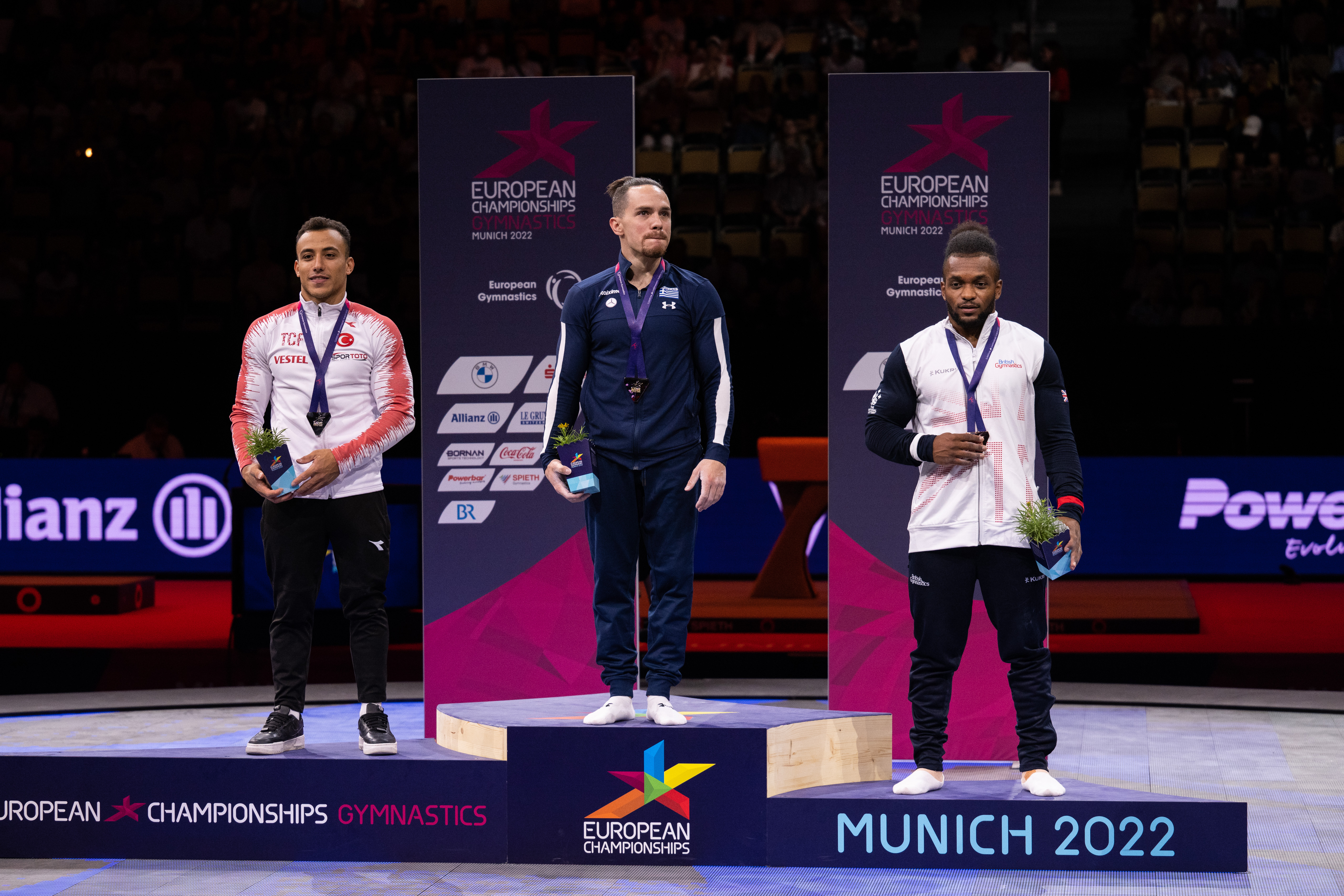
🥇 Eleftherios Petrounias 🥈 Adem Asil 🥉 Courtney Tulloch

Oldest and youngest competitors

	Name	Country	Date of birth	Age
Youngest	Adem Asil	Turkey	21 February 1999	23 years and 6 months
Oldest	Vahagn Davtyan	Armenia	19 August 1988	34 years and 2 days

Position	Gymnast	D Score	E Score	Penalty	Total
1st place, gold medalist(s)	(Greece) Eleftherios Petrounias	6.2	8.933		15.133
2nd place, silver medalist(s)	(Turkey) Adem Asil	6.3	8.733		15.033
3rd place, bronze medalist(s)	(United Kingdom) Courtney Tulloch	6.1	8.766		14.866
4	(Armenia) Vahagn Davtyan	6.0	8.766		14.766
5	(Austria) Vinzenz Hoeck	6.2	8.533		14.733
6	(Azerbaijan) Nikita Simonov	6.3	8.266		14.566
7	(Ukraine) Igor Radivilov	6.0	8.500		14.500
8	(Armenia) Artur Avetisyan	5.6	8.133		13.733

=== Vault ===
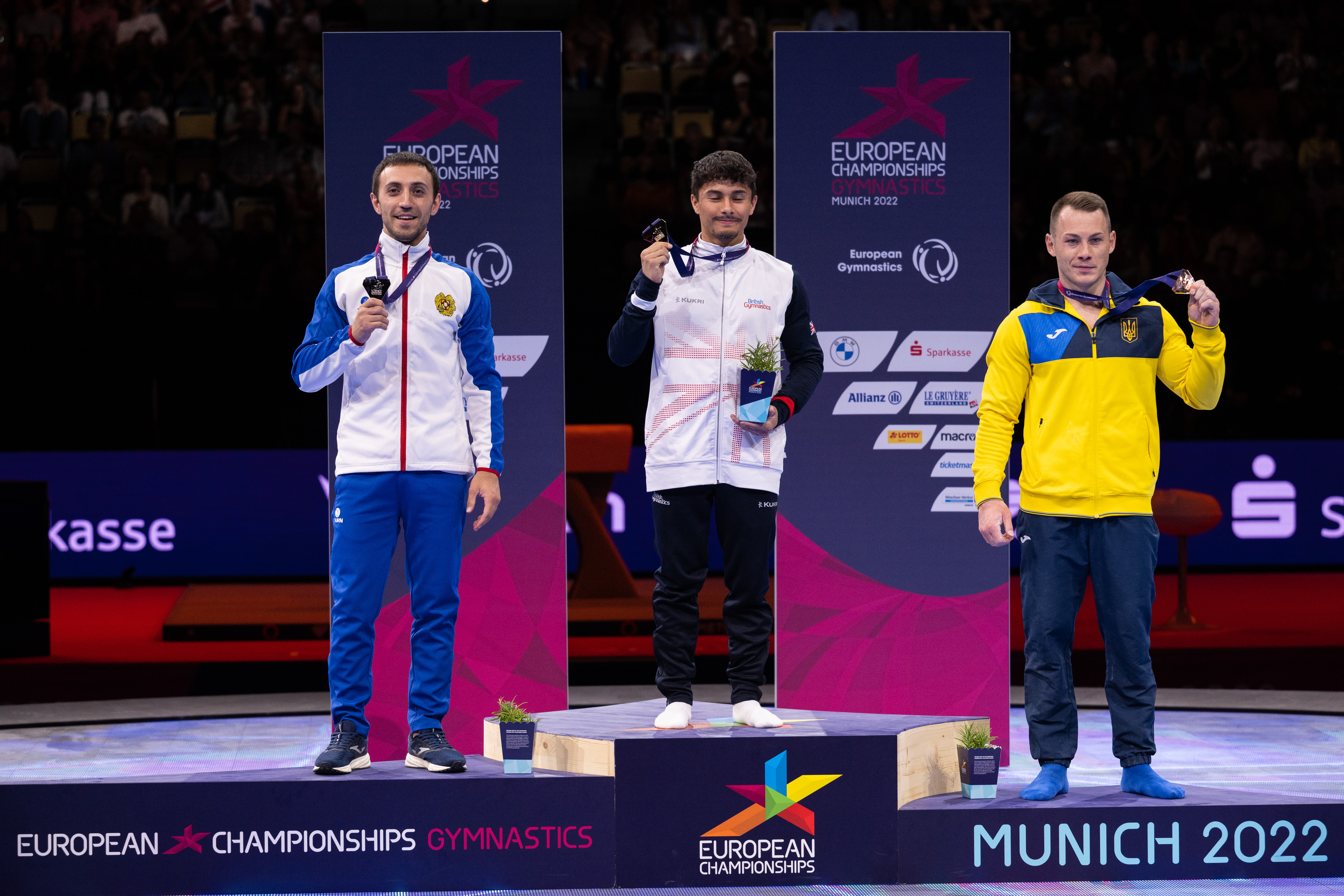
🥇 Jake Jarman 🥈 Artur Davtyan 🥉 Igor Radivilov

Oldest and youngest competitors

	Name	Country	Date of birth	Age
Youngest	Leo Saladino	France	2 August 2002	20 years and 19 days
Oldest	Artur Davtyan	Armenia	8 August 1992	30 years and 13 days

Position	Gymnast	Vault 1				Vault 2				Total
Position	Gymnast	D Score	E Score	Pen.	Score 1	D Score	E Score	Pen.	Score 2	Total
1st place, gold medalist(s)	(United Kingdom) Jake Jarman (Note: Unlike the other apparatus where ties are separated by the highest execution score, ties on vault are broken in the first instance by the highest scoring single vault of the two performed before comparing execution. In this case, Jarman's highest vault of 15.200 narrowly eclipsed Davtyan's highest score of 15.066, thus making Jarman the champion.)	5.6	9.166		14.766	6.0	9.200		15.200	14.983
2nd place, silver medalist(s)	(Armenia) Artur Davtyan	5.6	9.466		15.066	5.6	9.300		14.900	14.983
3rd place, bronze medalist(s)	(Ukraine) Igor Radivilov	5.6	9.233		14.833	5.6	9.366		14.966	14.899
4	(Switzerland) Andrin Frey	5.6	9.100		14.700	5.0	9.300		14.300	14.500
5	(Romania) Gabriel Burtanete	5.6	9.066	0.100	14.566	5.6	8.766	0.300	14.066	14.316
6	(Azerbaijan) Ivan Tikhonov	5.6	8.933		14.533	5.2	8.900	0.100	14.000	14.266
7	(United Kingdom) Courtney Tulloch	5.6	9.100		14.700	6.0	7.800	0.300	13.500	14.100
8	(France) Leo Saladino	5.6	8.766		14.366	5.2	7.833		13.033	13.699

- (United Kingdom) Giarnni Regini-Moran withdrew and was replaced by teammate (United Kingdom) Jake Jarman who had not qualified due to the two-per-country rule.

=== Parallel bars ===
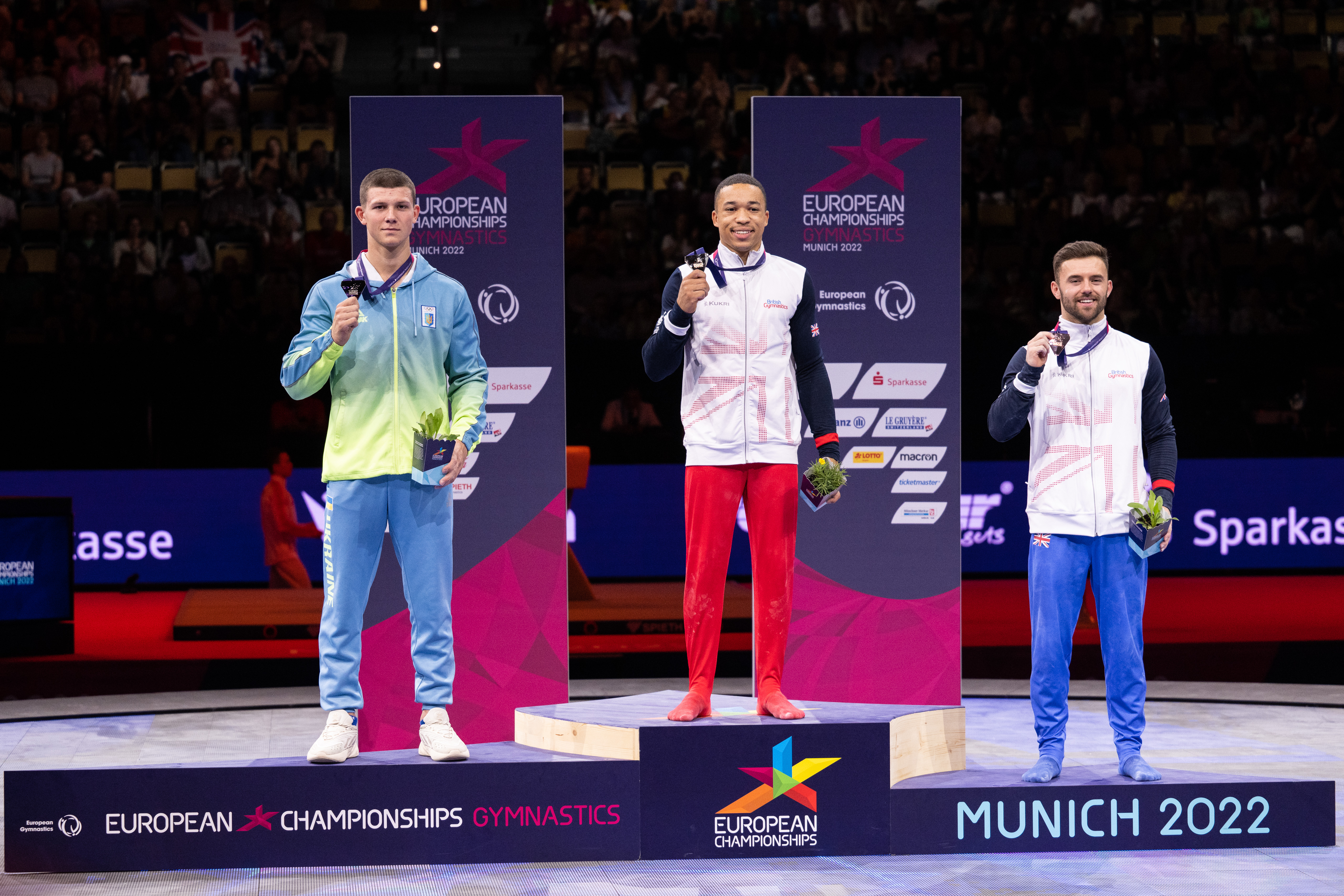
🥇 Joe Fraser 🥈 Illia Kovtun 🥉 Giarnni Regini-Moran

Oldest and youngest competitors

	Name	Country	Date of birth	Age
Youngest	Illia Kovtun	Ukraine	10 August 2003	19 years and 11 days
Oldest	Lukas Dauser	Germany	15 June 1993	29 years, 2 months and 6 days

Position	Gymnast	D Score	E Score	Penalty	Total
1st place, gold medalist(s)	(United Kingdom) Joe Fraser	6.5	8.833		15.333
2nd place, silver medalist(s)	(Ukraine) Illia Kovtun	6.6	8.733		15.333
3rd place, bronze medalist(s)	(United Kingdom) Giarnni Regini-Moran	6.3	8.566		14.866
4	(Spain) Nicolau Mir	5.9	8.833		14.733
5	(Italy) Matteo Levantesi	5.7	8.733		14.433
6	(Turkey) Ahmet Önder	6.2	8.166		14.366
7	(Turkey) Ferhat Arıcan	6.5	7.200		13.700
8	(Germany) Lukas Dauser	6.2	7.433		13.633

=== Horizontal bar ===
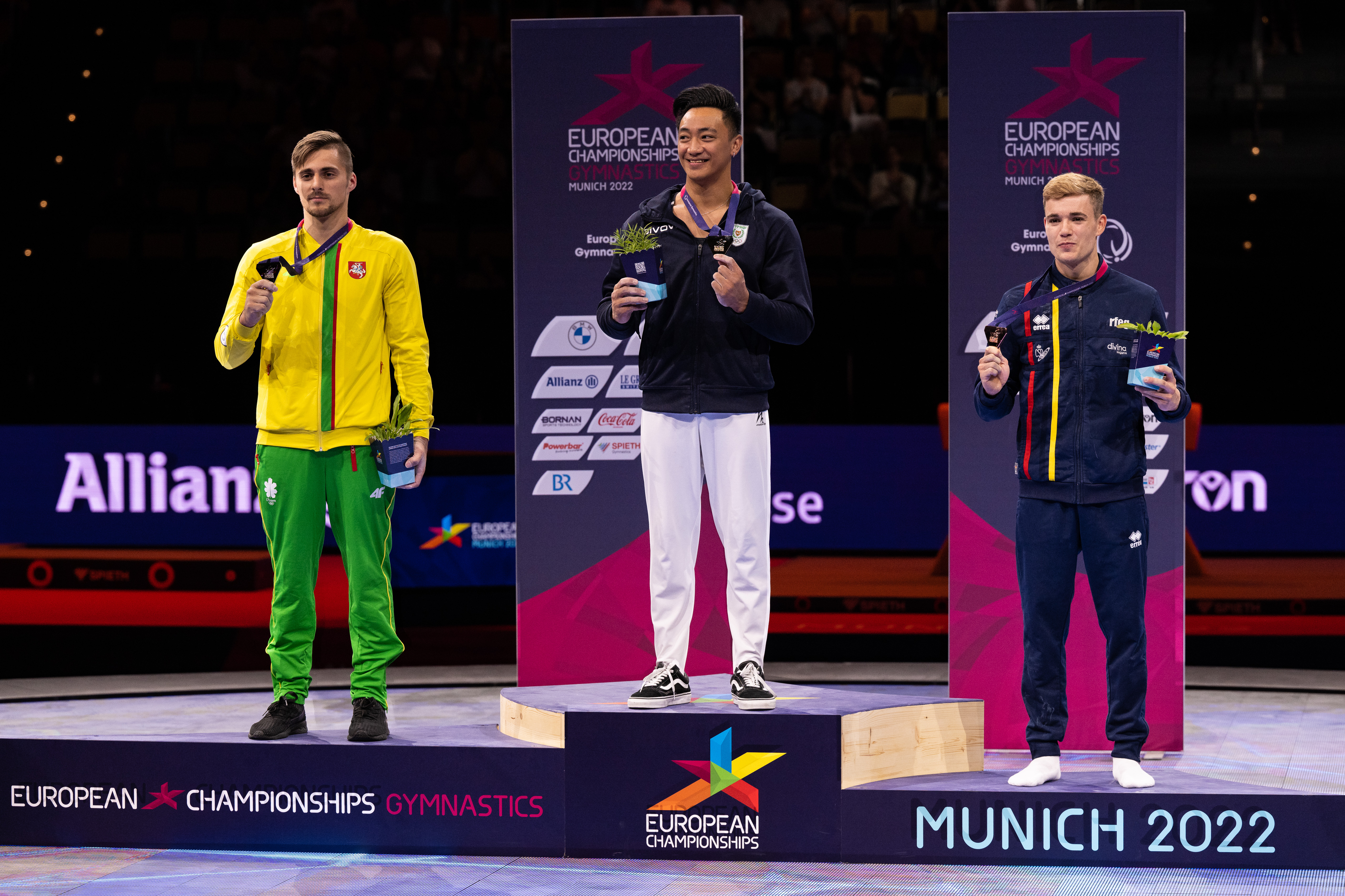
🥇 Marios Georgiou 🥈 Robert Tvorogal 🥉 Joel Plata

Oldest and youngest competitors

	Name	Country	Date of birth	Age
Youngest	Noah Kuavita	Belgium	28 July 1999	23 years and 24 days
Oldest	Robert Tvorogal	Lithuania	5 October 1994	27 years, 10 months and 16 days

Position	Gymnast	D Score	E Score	Penalty	Total
1st place, gold medalist(s)	(Cyprus) Marios Georgiou	6.0	8.400		14.400
2nd place, silver medalist(s)	(Lithuania) Robert Tvorogal	5.6	8.400		14.000
3rd place, bronze medalist(s)	(Spain) Joel Plata	5.8	8.200		14.000
4	(United Kingdom) James Hall	5.5	8.433		13.933
5	(Switzerland) Noe Seifert	5.7	8.200		13.900
6	(France) Paul Degouy	4.9	8.266		13.166
7	(Belgium) Noah Kuavita	5.4	7.766		13.166
8	(Turkey) Ahmet Önder	5.5	6.866		12.366

== Junior results ==
=== Team ===
25 nations took part in the junior team competition. The following were the top 8 teams.

Rank	Team	Floor (gymnastics)	Pommel horse	Rings (gymnastics)	Vault (gymnastics)	Parallel bars	Horizontal bar	Total
1st place, gold medalist(s)	Italy	39.799	38.632	39.233	42.166	38.799	38.766	237.395
1st place, gold medalist(s)	Tommaso Brugnami	13.400		13.000	14.200		12.866	237.395
1st place, gold medalist(s)	Davide Oppizzio	13.166		13.000		12.933	13.200	237.395
1st place, gold medalist(s)	Diego Vazzola		12.600			13.200		237.395
1st place, gold medalist(s)	Riccardo Villa		13.066	13.233	13.900	12.666	12.700	237.395
1st place, gold medalist(s)	Jacopo Zuliani	13.233	12.966		14.066			237.395
2nd place, silver medalist(s)	France	39.732	37.332	38.532	42.133	39.666	38.765	236.160
2nd place, silver medalist(s)	Romain Cavallaro		12.566		13.933	13.133	12.866	236.160
2nd place, silver medalist(s)	Lorenzo Sainte-Rose		12.033			13.033		236.160
2nd place, silver medalist(s)	Axel Breche	12.933	12.733	12.933				236.160
2nd place, silver medalist(s)	Anthony Mansard	13.466		12.866	14.000	13.500	13.233	236.160
2nd place, silver medalist(s)	Nicolas Diez	13.333		12.733	14.200		12.666	236.160
3rd place, bronze medalist(s)	Great Britain	40.132	38.099	38.133	42.333	39.266	38.166	236.129
3rd place, bronze medalist(s)	Danny Crouch	13.566	12.900		14.033		12.900	236.129
3rd place, bronze medalist(s)	Oakley Banks				14.000	13.000	12.566	236.129
3rd place, bronze medalist(s)	Jack Stanley	13.466		13.000				236.129
3rd place, bronze medalist(s)	Reuben Ward	13.100	13.466	12.600	14.300	12.800	12.700	236.129
3rd place, bronze medalist(s)	Gabriel Langton		11.733	12.533		13.466		236.129
4	Switzerland	39.166	37.966	38.399	41.566	39.200	38.466	234.763
4	Jan Imhof	13.300		12.866	13.700	13.100	12.800	234.763
4	Matteo Giubellini	13.100	12.933	12.833	13.833	13.000	12.966	234.763
4	Kilian Schmitt		12.600			13.100		234.763
4	Mario Brand	12.766		12.700	14.033		12.700	234.763
4	Mirco Riva		12.433					234.763
5	Germany	40.366	37.265	38.799	40.499	38.765	38.866	234.560
5	Jukka Ole Nissinen		11.866	13.266		12.133	13.033	234.560
5	Maxim Kovalenko	13.600		12.900	13.700		12.700	234.560
5	Daniel Mousichidis	13.500				13.066	13.133	234.560
5	Jonas Eder		13.166	12.633	13.466	13.566		234.560
5	Timo Eder	13.266	12.233		13.333			234.560
6	Hungary	40.098	36.566	39.133	42.333	37.599	37.932	233.661
6	Botond Molnár	13.866	12.700	13.333	14.333	13.366	12.366	233.661
6	Szilárd Závory	13.166	12.166	13.200	13.900	12.133	13.033	233.661
6	Balázs Juhász	13.066	11.700				12.533	233.661
6	István Mentovai				14.100			233.661
6	Zala Zámbori			12.600		12.100		233.661
7	Ukraine	38.233	38.466	38.865	41.032	38.566	37.765	232.927
7	Radomyr Stelmakh	13.333	13.366	12.966	14.266		12.466	232.927
7	Dmytro Prudko	12.500	12.200	13.033	12.900	13.000		232.927
7	Yulian Yuzyfyshyn				13.866			232.927
7	Igor Dyshuk		12.900			12.566	12.466	232.927
7	Ivan Rudyi	12.400		12.866		13.000	12.833	232.927
8	Spain	38.699	37.900	38.166	42.699	37.766	37.666	232.896
8	Daniel Carrión	12.733	12.900	12.900	14.366	13.400	12.733	232.896
8	Alvaro Giraldez	12.733		12.566		12.266	12.700	232.896
8	Pablo Ruiz		12.400	12.700	13.900			232.896
8	Unai Baigorri	13.233	12.600		14.433			232.896
8	Oriol Rifa					12.100	12.233	232.896

=== All-around ===
74 gymnasts took part in the junior individual all-around competition with no prior qualification round. The following is the top 10 of the all-around.

Position	Gymnast	Floor (gymnastics)	Pommel horse	Rings (gymnastics)	Vault (gymnastics)	Parallel bars	Horizontal bar	Total
1st place, gold medalist(s)	Botond Molnár (HUN)	13.866	12.700	13.333	14.333	13.366	12.366	79.964
2nd place, silver medalist(s)	Daniel Carrión (ESP)	12.733	12.900	12.900	14.366	13.400	12.733	79.032
3rd place, bronze medalist(s)	Reuben Ward (GBR)	13.100	13.466	12.600	14.300	12.800	12.700	78.966
4	Matteo Giubellini (SUI)	13.100	12.933	12.833	13.833	13.000	12.966	78.665
5	Radomyr Stelmakh (UKR)	13.333	13.366	12.966	14.266	12.266	12.466	78.663
6	Riccardo Villa (ITA)	13.066	13.066	13.233	13.900	12.666	12.700	78.631
7	Tommaso Brugnami (ITA)	13.400	12.533	13.000	14.200	12.533	12.866	78.532
8	Danny Crouch (GBR)	13.566	12.900	11.933	14.033	12.666	12.900	77.998
9	Bozhidar Zlatanov (BUL)	13.066	11.666	12.966	14.200	13.266	12.833	77.997
10	Jan Imhof (SUI)	13.300	12.000	12.866	13.700	13.100	12.800	77.766

=== Floor ===
Position	Gymnast	D Score	E Score	Penalty	Total
1st place, gold medalist(s)	(Germany) Daniel Mousichidis	5.1	8.600		13.700
2nd place, silver medalist(s)	(France) Anthony Mansard	4.9	8.566		13.466
3rd place, bronze medalist(s)	(Italy) Tommaso Brugnami	4.8	8.566		13.366
4	(Netherlands) Amine Abaidi	4.5	8.800		13.300
5	(United Kingdom) Danny Crouch	5.0	8.533	0.300	13.233
6	(Hungary) Botond Molnar	5.0	8.400	0.200	13.200
7	(United Kingdom) Jack Stanley	4.9	8.300		13.200
8	(Germany) Maxim Kovalenko	4.8	8.133		12.933

=== Pommel horse ===
Position	Gymnast	D Score	E Score	Penalty	Total
1st place, gold medalist(s)	(Italy) Riccardo Villa	5.5	8.500		14.000
2nd place, silver medalist(s)	(Armenia) Hamlet Manukyan	5.2	8.766		13.966
3rd place, bronze medalist(s)	(Georgia (country)) Dachi Dolidze	5.1	8.433		13.533
4	(Armenia) Mamikon Khachatryan	5.0	8.366		13.366
5	(Ukraine) Radomyr Stelmakh	5.2	8.166		13.366
6	(Austria) Alfred Schwaiger	4.8	8.466		13.266
7	(Germany) Jonas Eder	4.6	8.566		13.166
8	(United Kingdom) Reuben Ward	4.6	8.466		13.066

=== Rings ===
Position	Gymnast	D Score	E Score	Penalty	Total
1st place, gold medalist(s)	(Sweden) Luis Il-Sung Melander	5.0	8.633		13.633
2nd place, silver medalist(s)	(Armenia) Hamlet Manukyan	4.4	8.933		13.333
3rd place, bronze medalist(s)	(Germany) Jukka Ole Nissinen	4.2	8.900		13.100
4	(Armenia) Erik Baghdasaryan	4.1	8.900		13.000
5	(Turkey) Volkan Hamarat	4.1	8.866		12.966
6	(Hungary) Botond Molnár	4.4	8.533		12.933
7	(Italy) Riccardo Villa	4.3	8.600		12.900
8	(Hungary) Szilárd Závory	4.5	8.400		12.900

=== Vault ===
Position	Gymnast	Vault 1				Vault 2				Total
Position	Gymnast	D Score	E Score	Pen.	Score 1	D Score	E Score	Pen.	Score 2	Total
1st place, gold medalist(s)	(Finland) Joona Reiman	5.6	9.233		14.833	5.2	9.066		14.266	14.549
2nd place, silver medalist(s)	(Norway) Sebastian Sponevik	5.2	9.033	0.100	14.500	5.2	9.300		14.500	14.316
3rd place, bronze medalist(s)	(Hungary) Botond Molnár	5.2	9.300		14.500	4.8	9.200		14.000	14.250
4	(Italy) Tommaso Brugnami	4.8	9.400		14.200	4.8	9.333		14.133	14.166
5	(France) Nicolas Diez	5.2	8.466		13.666	4.8	9.100		13.900	13.783
6	(Bulgaria) Bozhidar Zlatanov	5.2	8.933	0.100	14.033	5.2	7.866		13.066	13.549
7	(Spain) Unai Baigorri	5.2	7.966		13.166	4.8	9.000	0.100	13.700	13.433
8	(United Kingdom) Jack Stanley	4.8	9.066		13.866	4.8	7.800	0.100	12.500	13.183

=== Parallel bars ===
Position	Gymnast	D Score	E Score	Penalty	Total
1st place, gold medalist(s)	(Armenia) Erik Baghdasaryan	4.4	9.200		13.600
2nd place, silver medalist(s)	(United Kingdom) Gabriel Langton	4.5	9.066		13.566
3rd place, bronze medalist(s)	(Spain) Daniel Carrión	4.5	8.900		13.400
4	(Israel) Dmytro Dotsenko	4.5	8.866		13.366
5	(France) Anthony Mansard	4.5	8.833		13.333
6	(Bulgaria) Daniel Trifonov	4.7	8.433		13.133
7	(Germany) Jonas Eder	4.5	8.466		12.966
8	(Turkey) Altan Dogan	4.5	6.733		11.233

=== Horizontal bar ===
Position	Gymnast	D Score	E Score	Penalty	Total
1st place, gold medalist(s)	(Israel) Dmytro Dotsenko	4.5	8.866		13.366
2nd place, silver medalist(s)	(Germany) Jukka Ole Nissinen	4.3	8.966		13.266
3rd place, bronze medalist(s)	(Germany) Daniel Mousichidis	4.4	8.866		13.266
4	(France) Anthony Mansard	4.4	8.766		13.166
5	(Switzerland) Matteo Giubellini	4.2	8.900		13.100
6	(Italy) Davide Oppizzio	4.3	8.800		13.100
7	(United Kingdom) Danny Crouch	4.1	8.833		12.933
8	(Hungary) Szilárd Závory	4.2	7.033		11.233

== Qualification ==
=== Senior ===
==== Team competition ====
Rank	Team	Floor (gymnastics)	Pommel horse	Rings (gymnastics)	Vault (gymnastics)	Parallel bars	Horizontal bar	Total	Qual.
1	Great Britain	42.365	41.666	42.532	44.599	43.865	40.800	255.827	Q
1	James Hall		13.933	13.533		14.133	13.900	255.827	Q
1	Joe Fraser	13.633	14.600	14.266		15.066	13.700	255.827	Q
1	Jake Jarman	14.466			14.833		13.200	255.827	Q
1	Courtney Tulloch			14.733	14.800			255.827	Q
1	Giarnni Regini-Moran	14.266	13.133		14.966	14.666		255.827	Q
2	Turkey	41.032	41.100	43.066	44.166	43.499	39.999	252.862	Q
2	Ferhat Arıcan		14.300		14.433	14.700	13.133	252.862	Q
2	Kerem Sener							252.862	Q
2	Ahmet Önder	14.266	13.500	13.933	14.533	14.666	14.233	252.862	Q
2	Adem Asil	14.266	13.300	14.933	15.200	14.133	12.633	252.862	Q
2	Mehmet Kosak	12.500		14.200				252.862	Q
3	Spain	42.266	40.332	41.132	44.066	43.133	41.200	252.129	Q
3	Rayderley Zapata	14.233		14.033	14.600			252.129	Q
3	Joel Plata	14.033	13.566	13.433	14.766		14.000	252.129	Q
3	Néstor Abad			13.666		14.400	13.800	252.129	Q
3	Nicolau Mir	14.000	13.000		14.700	14.633	13.400	252.129	Q
3	Thierno Diallo		13.766			14.100		252.129	Q
4	Italy	42.533	39.265	40.699	42.699	42.599	40.699	248.494	Q
4	Nicola Bartolini	14.500	13.566		14.300	13.633		248.494	Q
4	Lorenzo Minh Casali	14.200	12.833	13.500	14.466	14.166	13.366	248.494	Q
4	Andrea Cingolani			14.066				248.494	Q
4	Matteo Levantesi		12.866	13.133	13.933	14.800	13.533	248.494	Q
4	Yumin Abbadini	13.833					13.800	248.494	Q
5	France	40.965	40.932	40.000	43.066	42.198	39.732	246.893	Q
5	Benjamin Osberger	13.866	14.366	13.100				246.893	Q
5	Leo Saladino	13.366	13.066	13.700	14.600	13.866	13.033	246.893	Q
5	Paul Degouy	13.733		13.200	14.400	14.066	13.833	246.893	Q
5	Cameron-Lie Bernard					14.266		246.893	Q
5	Julien Saleur		13.500		14.066		12.866	246.893	Q
6	Switzerland	41.799	39.366	39.999	41.865	41.399	41.532	245.960	Q
6	Noe Seifert	13.933	13.666	13.600	14.066	13.633	14.133	245.960	Q
6	Andrin Frey	14.033			14.233			245.960	Q
6	Moreno Kratter	13.833					13.566	245.960	Q
6	Marco Pfyl		12.500	13.066	13.566	13.700	13.833	245.960	Q
6	Dominic Tamsel		13.200	13.333		14.066		245.960	Q
7	Germany	40.799	41.898	40.699	41.599	41.098	39.566	245.659	Q
7	Lukas Dauser	13.766		13.333	13.633	14.766	13.500	245.659	Q
7	Nils Dunkel		14.366	13.400		13.566		245.659	Q
7	Glenn Trebing	13.800	13.666		13.766		12.333	245.659	Q
7	Andreas Toba		13.866	13.966		12.766		245.659	Q
7	Lucas Kochan	13.233			14.200		13.733	245.659	Q
8	Hungary	40.832	39.332	39.999	42.233	41.865	40.666	244.927	Q
8	Krisztofer Mészáros	14.500	13.233	13.033	14.400	14.233	13.600	244.927	Q
8	Krisztián Balázs	12.966				13.966	13.733	244.927	Q
8	Benedek Tomcsányi		12.933	13.366	13.933			244.927	Q
8	Botond Kardos	13.366			13.900	13.666	13.333	244.927	Q
8	Balázs Kiss		13.166	13.600				244.927	Q

==== Floor ====
Rank	Gymnast	D Score	E Score	Pen.	Total	Qual.
1	(Italy) Nicola Bartolini	5.9	8.600		14.500	Q
2	(Hungary) Krisztofer Mészáros	6.0	8.500		14.500	Q
3	(Ukraine) Illia Kovtun	6.1	8.366		14.466	Q
4	(United Kingdom) Jake Jarman	6.3	8.166		14.466	Q
5	(Turkey) Ahmet Önder	5.8	8.566	0.100	14.266	Q
6	(Israel) Artem Dolgopyat	6.1	8.466	0.300	14.266	Q
7	(Turkey) Adem Asil	5.8	8.466		14.266	Q
8	(United Kingdom) Giarnni Regini-Moran	5.9	8.366		14.266	Q
9	(Spain) Rayderley Zapata	6.0	8.233		14.233	R1
10	(Italy) Lorenzo Minh Casali	6.0	8.200		14.200	R2
11	(Finland) Emil Soravuo	5.5	8.633		14.133	R3

==== Pommel horse ====
Rank	Gymnast	D Score	E Score	Pen.	Total	Qual.
1	(United Kingdom) Joe Fraser	6.1	8.500		14.600	Q
2	(Netherlands) Loran de Munck	6.3	8.266		14.566	Q
3	(Armenia) Harutyun Merdinyan	6.1	8.400		14.500	Q
4	(Croatia) Filip Ude	5.8	8.633		14.433	Q
5	(France) Benjamin Osberger	5.7	8.666		14.366	Q
6	(Germany) Nils Dunkel	6.1	8.266		14.366	Q
7	(Turkey) Ferhat Arıcan	5.8	8.500		14.300	Q
8	(Armenia) Artur Davtyan	5.7	8.500		14.200	Q
9	(Republic of Ireland) Rhys McClenaghan	5.9	8.300		14.200	R1
10	(United Kingdom) James Hall	5.9	8.033		13.933	R2
11	(Germany) Andreas Toba	5.6	8.266		13.866	R3

==== Rings ====
Rank	Gymnast	D Score	E Score	Pen.	Total	Qual.
1	(Greece) Eleftherios Petrounias	6.2	8.900		15.100	Q
2	(Turkey) Adem Asil	6.3	8.633		14.933	Q
3	(Austria) Vinzenz Hoeck	6.2	8.666		14.866	Q
4	(United Kingdom) Courtney Tulloch	6.1	8.633		14.733	Q
5	(Armenia) Vahagn Davtyan	6.0	8.666		14.666	Q
6	(Armenia) Artur Avetisyan	6.0	8.633		14.633	Q
7	(Azerbaijan) Nikita Simonov	6.0	8.600		14.600	Q
8	(Ukraine) Igor Radivilov	6.0	8.400		14.400	Q
9	(United Kingdom) Joe Fraser	5.6	8.666		14.266	R1
10	(Turkey) Mehmet Kosak	6.1	8.100		14.200	R2
11	(Italy) Andrea Cingolani	6.0	8.066		14.066	R3

==== Vault ====
Rank	Gymnast	Vault 1				Vault 2				Total	Qual.
Rank	Gymnast	D Score	E Score	Pen.	Score 1	D Score	E Score	Pen.	Score 2	Total	Qual.
1	(Armenia) Artur Davtyan	5.6	9.533		15.133	5.6	9.566		15.166	15.149	Q
2	(Ukraine) Igor Radivilov	5.6	9.233		14.833	5.6	9.233		14.833	14.833	Q
3	(Romania) Gabriel Burtanete	5.6	9.233		14.833	5.6	9.033		14.633	14.733	Q
4	(United Kingdom) Courtney Tulloch	5.6	9.200		14.800	6.0	8.700	0.100	14.600	14.700	Q
5	(United Kingdom) Giarnni Regini-Moran	5.6	9.366		14.966	5.2	9.200		14.400	14.683	Q
6	(France) Leo Saladino	5.6	9.000		14.600	5.2	9.266	0.100	14.366	14.483	Q
7	(United Kingdom) Jake Jarman	5.6	9.233		14.833	6.0	8.033		14.033	14.433	–
8	(Switzerland) Andrin Frey	5.0	9.233		14.233	5.6	8.933		14.533	14.383	Q
9	(Azerbaijan) Ivan Tikhonov	5.2	9.233	0.100	14.333	5.6	8.933	0.100	14.433	14.383	Q
10	(Spain) Joel Plata	5.6	9.166		14.766	4.8	9.166		13.966	14.366	R1
11	(Turkey) Adem Asil	6.0	9.200		15.200	5.6	8.200	0.300	13.500	14.350	R2
12	(Italy) Nicola Bartolini	5.2	9.200	0.100	14.300	5.2	9.300	0.100	14.400	14.350	R3

==== Parallel bars ====
Rank	Gymnast	D Score	E Score	Pen.	Total	Qual.
1	(United Kingdom) Joe Fraser	6.5	8.566		15.066	Q
2	(Italy) Matteo Levantesi	5.6	9.200		14.800	Q
3	(Ukraine) Illia Kovtun	6.3	8.466		14.766	Q
4	(Germany) Lukas Dauser	6.4	8.366		14.766	Q
5	(Turkey) Ferhat Arıcan	6.5	8.200		14.700	Q
6	(United Kingdom) Giarnni Regini-Moran	6.1	8.566		14.666	Q
7	(Turkey) Ahmet Önder	6.6	8.066		14.666	Q
8	(Spain) Nicolau Mir	5.9	8.733		14.633	Q
9	(Spain) Néstor Abad	5.8	8.600		14.400	R1
10	(Bulgaria) David Huddleston	5.7	8.633		14.333	R2
11	(France) Cameron-Lie Bernard	6.3	7.966		14.266	R3

==== Horizontal bar ====
Rank	Gymnast	D Score	E Score	Pen.	Total	Qual.
1	(Cyprus) Marios Georgiou	5.8	8.433		14.233	Q
2	(Turkey) Ahmet Önder	5.9	8.333		14.233	Q
3	(Switzerland) Noe Seifert	5.7	8.433		14.133	Q
4	(Belgium) Noah Kuavita	5.8	8.266		14.066	Q
5	(Spain) Joel Plata	5.9	8.100		14.000	Q
6	(Lithuania) Robert Tvorogal	5.6	8.366		13.966	Q
7	(United Kingdom) James Hall	5.5	8.400		13.900	Q
8	(France) Paul Degouy	5.3	8.533		13.833	Q
9	(Switzerland) Marco Pfyl	5.6	8.233		13.833	R1
10	(Spain) Néstor Abad	5.3	8.500		13.800	R2
11	(Italy) Yumin Abbadini	5.6	8.200		13.800	R3

=== Junior ===
==== Floor ====
Rank	Gymnast	D Score	E Score	Pen.	Total	Qual.
1	(Hungary) Botond Molnár	5.0	8.866		13.866	Q
2	(Germany) Maxim Kovalenko	4.8	8.800		13.600	Q
3	(United Kingdom) Danny Crouch	5.0	8.566		13.566	Q
4	(Germany) Daniel Mousichidis	5.1	8.400		13.500	Q
5	(France) Anthony Mansard	4.9	8.566		13.466	Q
5	(United Kingdom) Jack Stanley	4.9	8.566		13.466	Q
7	(Netherlands) Amine Abaidi	4.5	8.900		13.400	Q
8	(Italy) Tommaso Brugnami	4.8	8.600		13.400	Q
9	(Austria) Gino Vetter	4.6	8.766		13.366	R1
10	(France) Nicolas Diez	5.0	8.333		13.333	R2
10	(Ukraine) Radomyr Stelmakh	5.0	8.333		13.333	R2

==== Pommel horse ====
Rank	Gymnast	D Score	E Score	Pen.	Total	Qual.
1	(Georgia (country)) Dachi Dolidze	5.1	8.700		13.800	Q
2	(Armenia) Hamlet Manukyan	5.2	8.600		13.800	Q
3	(Armenia) Mamikon Khachatryan	4.9	8.766		13.666	Q
4	(United Kingdom) Reuben Ward	4.8	8.666		13.466	Q
5	(Ukraine) Radomyr Stelmakh	5.1	8.266		13.366	Q
6	(Austria) Alfred Schwaiger	4.8	8.466		13.266	Q
7	(Germany) Jonas Eder	4.6	8.566		13.166	Q
8	(Italy) Riccardo Villa	5.0	8.066		13.066	Q
9	(Italy) Jacopo Zuliani	4.7	8.266		12.966	R1
10	(Israel) Dmytro Dotsenko	4.2	8.733		12.933	R2
11	(Switzerland) Matteo Giubellini	4.7	8.233		12.933	R3

==== Rings ====
Rank	Gymnast	D Score	E Score	Pen.	Total	Qual.
1	(Sweden) Luis Il-Sung Melander	5.0	8.600		13.600	Q
2	(Hungary) Botond Molnár	4.4	8.933		13.333	Q
3	(Germany) Jukka Ole Nissinen	4.2	9.066		13.266	Q
4	(Italy) Riccardo Villa	4.3	8.933		13.233	Q
5	(Armenia) Hamlet Manukyan	4.4	8.833		13.233	Q
6	(Hungary) Szilárd Závory	4.5	8.700		13.200	Q
7	(Turkey) Volkan Hamarat	4.1	9.033		13.133	Q
8	(Armenia) Erik Baghdasaryan	4.1	8.966		13.066	Q
9	(Ukraine) Dmytro Prudko	4.2	8.833		13.033	R1
10	(Italy) Tommaso Brugnami	4.1	8.900		13.000	R2
11	(Italy) Davide Oppizzio	4.1	8.900		13.000	–
12	(United Kingdom) Jack Stanley	4.3	8.700		13.000	R3

==== Vault ====
Rank	Gymnast	Vault 1				Vault 2				Total	Qual.
Rank	Gymnast	D Score	E Score	Pen.	Score 1	D Score	E Score	Pen.	Score 2	Total	Qual.
1	(Finland) Joona Reiman	5.6	9.066		14.666	5.2	9.100		14.300	14.483	Q
2	(Norway) Sebastian Sponevik	5.2	9.000	0.100	14.100	5.2	9.000		14.200	14.150	Q
3	(Spain) Unai Baigorri	5.2	9.233		14.433	4.8	9.033		13.833	14.133	Q
4	(France) Nicolas Diez	5.2	9.000		14.200	4.8	9.266		14.066	14.133	Q
5	(Hungary) Botond Molnár	5.2	9.133		14.333	4.8	9.000		13.800	14.066	Q
6	(Italy) Tommaso Brugnami	4.8	9.400		14.200	4.8	9.066		13.866	14.033	Q
7	(Bulgaria) Bozhidar Zlatanov	5.2	9.000		14.200	4.8	9.066		13.866	14.033	Q
8	(United Kingdom) Jack Stanley	4.8	9.133		13.933	4.8	8.933		13.733	13.833	Q
9	(Hungary) Szilárd Závory	5.2	8.800	0.100	13.900	4.8	9.033	0.100	13.733	13.816	R1
10	(Turkey) Alperen Ege Avci	4.8	9.466		14.266	4.0	9.266		13.266	13.766	R2
11	(Bulgaria) Daniel Trifonov	4.8	9.066		13.866	4.8	8.866	0.100	13.566	13.716	R3

==== Parallel bars ====
Rank	Gymnast	D Score	E Score	Pen.	Total	Qual.
1	(Germany) Jonas Eder	4.5	9.066		13.566	Q
2	(Israel) Dmytro Dotsenko	4.5	9.000		13.500	Q
2	(France) Anthony Mansard	4.5	9.000		13.500	Q
4	(United Kingdom) Gabriel Langton	4.5	8.966		13.466	Q
5	(Turkey) Altan Dogan	4.7	8.733		13.433	Q
6	(Spain) Daniel Carrión	4.5	8.900		13.400	Q
7	(Bulgaria) Daniel Trifonov	4.7	8.700		13.400	Q
8	(Armenia) Erik Baghdasaryan	4.4	8.966		13.366	Q
9	(Hungary) Botond Molnár	4.7	8.666		13.366	R1
10	(Bulgaria) Bozhidar Zlatanov	4.8	8.466		13.266	R2
11	(Italy) Diego Vazzola	4.3	8.900		13.200	R3

==== Horizontal bar ====
Rank	Gymnast	D Score	E Score	Pen.	Total	Qual.
1	(France) Anthony Mansard	4.4	8.833		13.233	Q
2	(Italy) Davide Oppizzio	4.3	8.900		13.200	Q
3	(Israel) Dmytro Dotsenko	4.5	8.700		13.200	Q
4	(Germany) Daniel Mousichidis	4.4	8.733		13.133	Q
5	(Germany) Jukka Ole Nissinen	4.3	8.733		13.033	Q
6	(Hungary) Szilárd Závory	4.5	8.533		13.033	Q
7	(Switzerland) Matteo Giubellini	4.2	8.766		12.966	Q
8	(United Kingdom) Danny Crouch	4.1	8.800		12.900	Q
9	(Turkey) Mert Kilicer	4.3	8.600		12.900	R1
10	(Italy) Tommaso Brugnami	4.2	8.666		12.866	R2
11	(France) Romain Cavallaro	4.4	8.466		12.866	R3

== World Championships qualification ==
This event served as qualification for the 2022 World Championships in Liverpool. The top thirteen teams that qualified a full team to compete are Great Britain, Turkey, Spain, Italy, France, Switzerland, Germany, Hungary, Ukraine, Romania, the Netherlands, Belgium, and Austria.

The top 23 individuals (max two per country) not part of a team qualified to compete as an individual. Those individuals were: Sofus Heggemsnes (NOR), Ivan Tikhonov (AZE), David Huddleston (BUL), Robert Kirmes (FIN), Elias Koski (FIN), David Rumbutis (SWE), Dominick Cunningham (IRL), Gagik Khachikyan (ARM), Harald Wibye (NOR), Jose Nogueira (POR), Uri Zeidel (ISR), Valgard Reinhardsson (ISL), Tomas Kuzmickas (LTU), Georgios Angonas (CYP), Gytis Chasazyrovas (LTU), Yordan Aleksandrov (BUL), Daniel Fox (IRL), Joakim Lenberg (SWE), Michalis Chari (CYP), Guilherme Campos (POR), Apostolos Kanellos (GRE), Bidzina Sitchinava (GEO), Saba Abesadze (GEO), Ricards Plate (LAT).
