= Andrea Cingolani =

Italian artistic gymnast (born 1990)

- Cingolani at the 2022 European Championships

Personal information
- Born: 14 August 1990 (age 36) Tolentino, Italy
- Height: 1.65 m (5 ft 5 in)

Gymnastics career
- Country represented: Italy
- Club: Centro Sportivo Aeronautica Militare
Medal record
Men's artistic gymnastics
Representing Italy
European Championships
Silver medal – second place	2022 Munich	Team
Bronze medal – third place	2013 Moscow	Floor
Mediterranean Games
Gold medal – first place	2009 Pescara	Team
Silver medal – second place	2009 Pescara	Vault
Silver medal – second place	2013 Mersin	Team

Andrea Cingolani (born 14 August 1990) is an Italian artistic gymnast who won an individual bronze medal at the 2013 European Artistic Gymnastics Championships and a silver medal with the team at the 2022 European Men's Artistic Gymnastics Championships.
