= Noah Kuavita =

Belgian gymnast (born 1999)

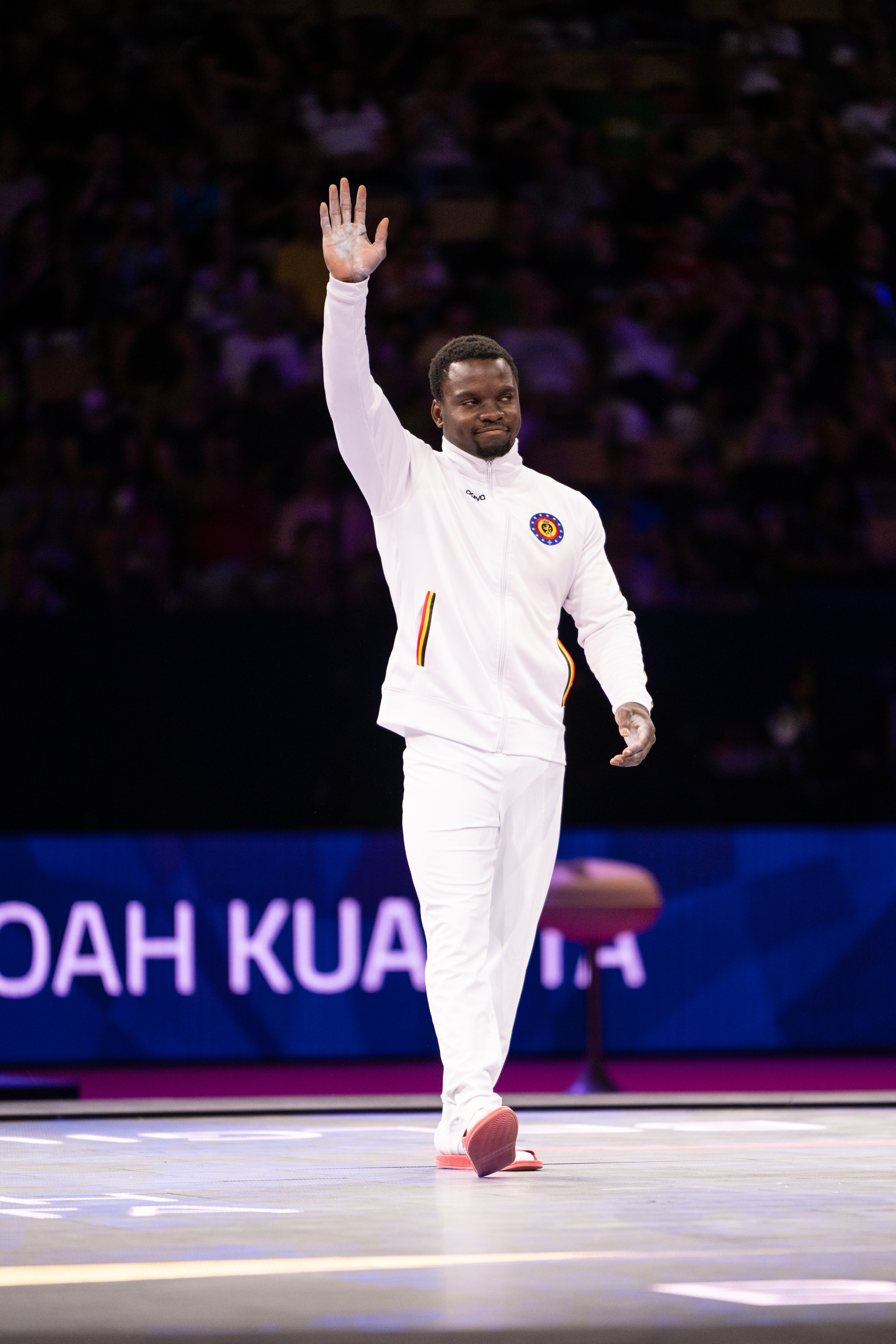
- Kuavita at the 2022 European Championships

Personal information
- Born: 28 July 1999 (age 27) Borgerhout, Belgium
- Height: 1.65 m (5 ft 5 in)

Gymnastics career
- Discipline: Men's artistic gymnastics
- Country represented: Belgium
- Club: Silok Deurne
- Head coaches: Koen Van Damme; Bram De Schepper
- Eponymous skills: Kuavita (parallel bars)

Noah Kuavita (born 28 July 1999) is a Belgian artistic gymnast. He represented Belgium at the 2024 Summer Olympics.

== Early life ==
Kuavita was born on 28 July 1999 in Borgerhout. His parents emigrated from Angola in 1994 during the Angolan Civil War. He began gymnastics when he was four years old.

== Gymnastics career ==
Kuavita qualified for the horizontal bar final at the 2018 European Championships and finished eighth. He competed with the Belgian team that finished 19th at the 2018 World Championships. He also competed at the 2019 World Championships and finished 18th with the Belgian team.

Kuavita competed at the 2021 World Championships in Kitakyushu, Japan. He qualified for the all-around final alongside teammate Luka van den Keybus, marking the first time two Belgian male gymnasts qualified for the all-around final at the World Artistic Gymnastics Championships. He finished 20th with a total score of 79.598. After the World Championships, he competed at the 2021 Koper World Challenge Cup. On the parallel bars, he debuted an original skill that was then named after him in the Code of Points.

Kuavita qualified for the horizontal bar final at the 2022 European Championships and finished seventh. He then competed with the Belgian team at the 2022 World Championships, helping them place 16th.

Kuavita and the Belgian team finished eighth at the 2023 European Championships. He then competed at the 2023 World Championships in Antwerp. As the highest-placing gymnast on parallel bars who did not already qualify through the team or all-around, he qualified for the 2024 Olympic Games.

== TV Appearance ==
In 2018, Kuavita and teammate Jimmy Verbaeys competed on Belgium's Got Talent and reached the finals.

== Eponymous skill ==
Kuavita has a skill on the parallel bars that is named after him in the Code of Points.

Apparatus	Name	Description	Difficulty (Note: Valid for the 2022–2024 Code of Points)	Added to Code of Points
Parallel bars	Kuavita	Double salto backwards with half turn to upper arm	F	2021 Koper World Challenge Cup
