= Benjamin Osberger =

French artistic gymnast

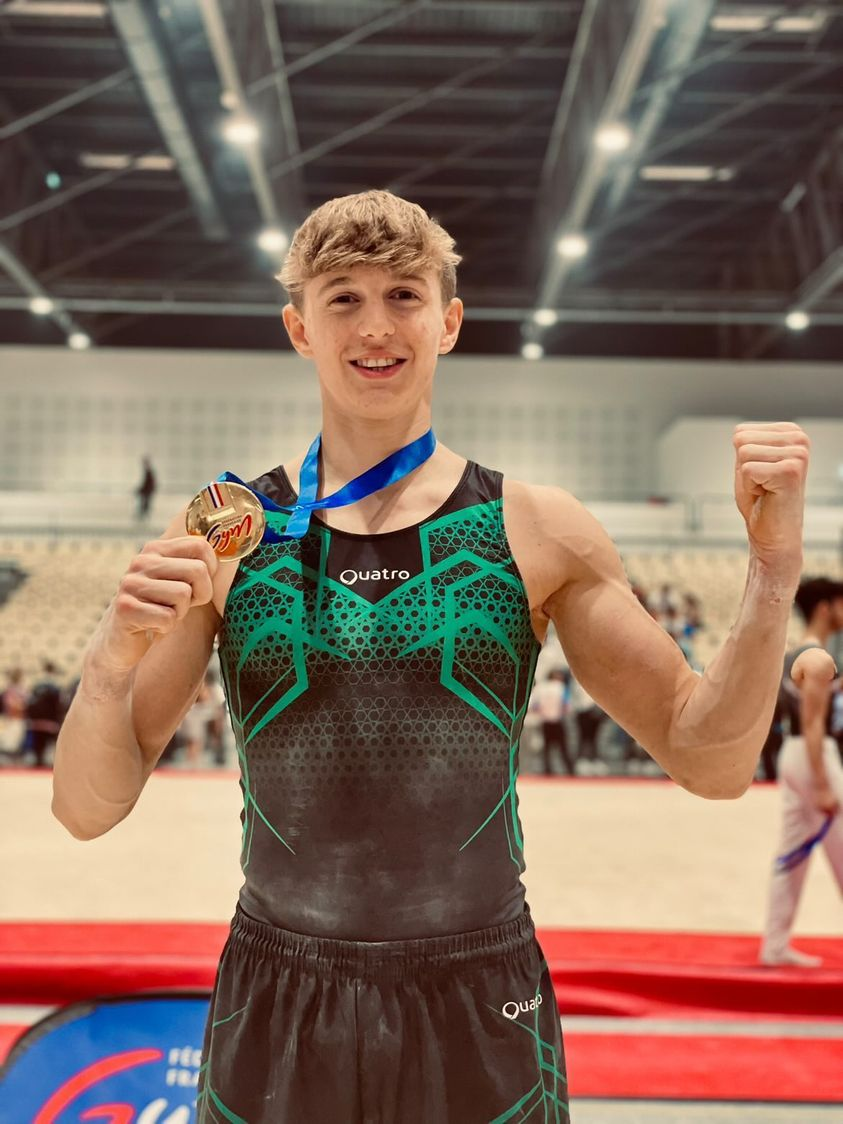
- Osberger at the 2022 French National Gymnastics Championships in Élancourt

Personal information
- Born: 1 October 2001 (age 25) Colmar, France

Gymnastics career
- Discipline: Men's artistic gymnastics
- Country represented: France; (2015–present)
- Training location: Paris, France
- Club: INSEP
- Gym: La Munsterienne
- Head coaches: Cyril Rigaud; Philippe Carmona

Benjamin Osberger (born October 1, 2001) is a French artistic gymnast. He began representing France in senior international competition in 2021, and has competed at the 2022 and 2023 World Artistic Gymnastics Championships.

== Early life ==
Osberger was born in Colmar in 2001 and began gymnastics training in 2004. He started training under his father, Thierry Osberger, at La Munsterienne club which is also presided by his grandfather, André Osberger.

== Gymnastics career ==
=== 2018 ===
In August, Osberger represented France at the 2018 European Men's Artistic Gymnastics Championships in Glasgow, United Kingdom. He contributed scores on five events (excluding still rings) to the junior team's seventh-place finish. He did not advance to any individual finals.

=== 2021 ===
Osberger made his senior international debut at the 2021 FIG World Challenge Cup in Osijek, Croatia in June. He placed twenty-sixth in qualifications for pommel horse – his only event – and did not qualify for the final. He later participated at the FIG World Challenge Cup in Koper, Slovenia, held in September. He competed in floor exercise and pommel horse in qualifications, advancing to the pommel horse final in eighth place. He later finished in seventh place with a score of 13.450.

=== 2022 ===
In August, he represented France at the 2022 European Men's Artistic Gymnastics Championships, held at the Olympiahalle in Munich, Germany. He contributed three scores to France's fifth-place team finish. Individually, he advanced to the pommel horse final, where he finished in fourth place with a score of 14.566.

=== 2023 ===
He competed at the 2023 World Artistic Gymnastics Championships.

=== 2024 ===
He competed in the European Men's Artistic Gymnastics Online Series and won the floor exercise in March.

== Personal life ==
Osberger has been diagnosed with Scheuermann's disease, as well as Spondylolisthesis.
