= Matteo Levantesi =

Italian artistic gymnast

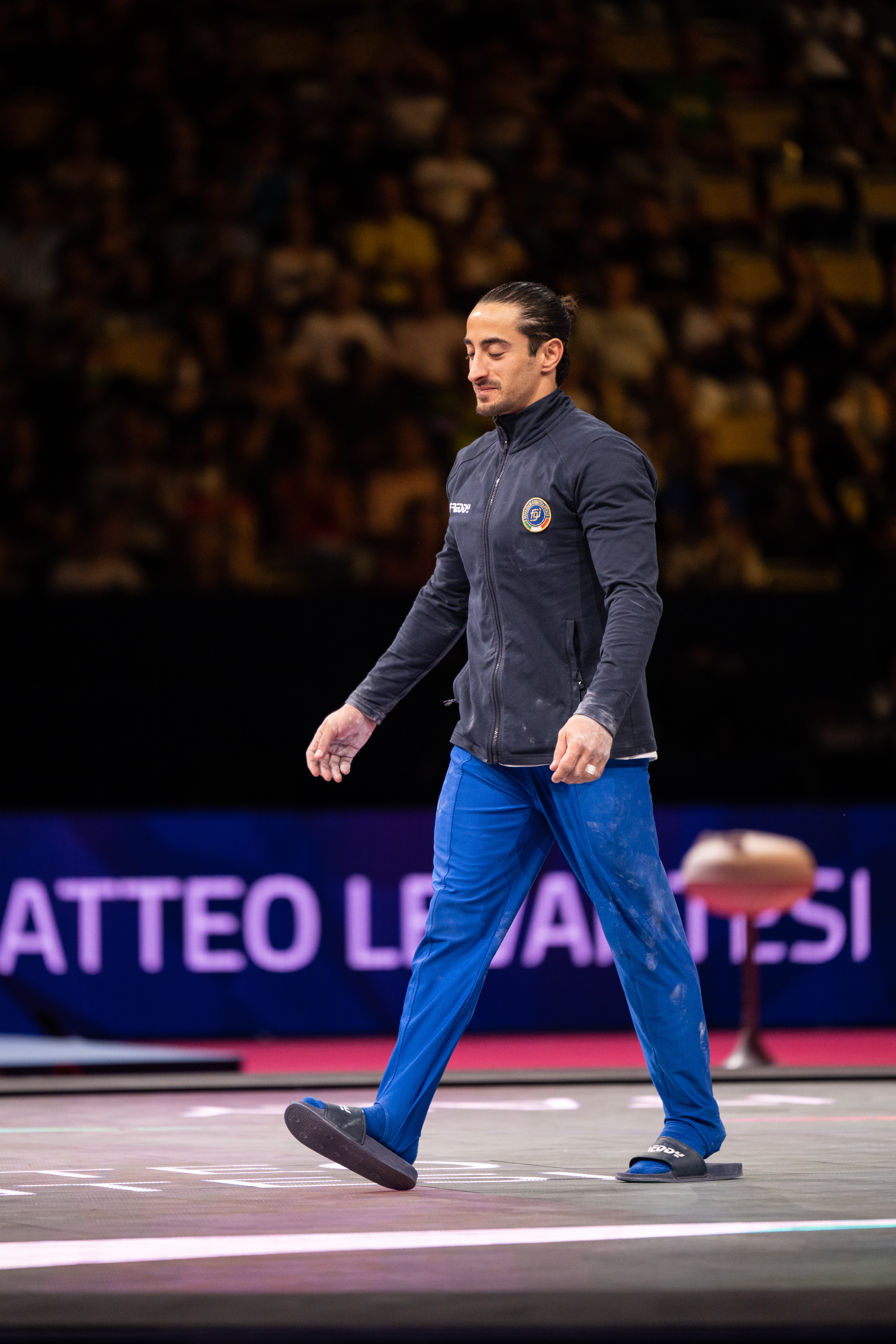

Personal information
- Full name: Matteo Levantesi
- Born: 18 April 1997 (age 29) Fermo, Italy

Gymnastics career
- Discipline: Men's artistic gymnastics
- Country represented: Italy (2017–present)
Medal record
Men's artistic gymnastics
Representing Italy
European Championships
Gold medal – first place	2023 Antalya	Team
Silver medal – second place	2022 Munich	Team
Bronze medal – third place	2024 Rimini	Team
Mediterranean Games
Silver medal – second place	2022 Oran	Team
Silver medal – second place	2022 Oran	Parallel bars
Silver medal – second place	2026 Taranto	Team
Bronze medal – third place	2022 Oran	Vault
Bronze medal – third place	2026 Taranto	Parallel bars

Matteo Levantesi (born 18 April 1997) is an Italian artistic gymnast who won silver medal with the team at the 2022 European Men's Artistic Gymnastics Championships.
