= Gymnastics at the 2024 Summer Olympics – Men's vault =

Men's vault at the Games of the XXXIII Olympiad
- Olympic artistic gymnastics
- Venue: Bercy Arena
- Dates: 27 July 2024 (qualifying); 4 August 2024 (final)
- Competitors: 18 from 16 nations
- Winning Score: 15.116

Medalists
1st place, gold medalist(s)		Carlos Yulo	Philippines
2nd place, silver medalist(s)		Artur Davtyan	Armenia
3rd place, bronze medalist(s)		Harry Hepworth	Great Britain

The men's vault event at the 2024 Summer Olympics was held on 27 July and 4 August 2024 at the Accor Arena (referred to as the Bercy Arena due to IOC sponsorship rules). Unlike the other apparatus events, the vault requires gymnasts to perform two exercises in order for results to count towards the vault final; most of the gymnasts perform only one (if they are participating in team or individual all-around) or none (if they are participating in only other apparatus). 18 gymnasts from 16 nations (of the 318 total gymnasts) competed in the two-exercise vault in the qualifying round.

== Background ==
This was the 26th appearance of the event, which is one of the five apparatus events held every time there were apparatus events at the Summer Olympics (no apparatus events were held in 1900, 1908, 1912, or 1920).

== Competition format ==
The top 8 qualifiers in the qualification phase (limit two per NOC) advanced to the apparatus final. For the vault, only gymnasts who performed two exercises on the vault were considered for the final; the average score of the two exercises was counted. The finalists again performed two vaults. Qualification scores were then ignored, with only final round scores (average of the two exercises) counting.

== Schedule ==
The competition was held over two days, 27 July and 4 August. The qualifying round for all men's gymnastics events was the first day with the apparatus final on the second day.

All times are Central European Summer Time (UTC+2)

Date	Time	Round	Subdivision
Saturday, 27 July 2024	11:00	Qualification	Subdivision 1
Saturday, 27 July 2024	15:30	Qualification	Subdivision 2
Saturday, 27 July 2024	20:00	Qualification	Subdivision 3
Sunday, 4 August 2024	16:24	Final	–
All times are Central European Summer Time (UTC+2)

== Results ==
=== Qualifying ===
Rank	Gymnast	Vault 1				Vault 2				Total	Results
Rank	Gymnast	D Score	E Score	Penalty	Score 1	D Score	E Score	Penalty	Score 2	Total	Results
1	Nazar Chepurnyi (UKR)	5.6	9.266		14.866	5.6	9.200		14.800	14.833	Q
2	Harry Hepworth (GBR)	5.6	9.033		14.633	5.6	9.300		14.900	14.766	Q
3	Aurel Benović (CRO)	5.6	8.966		14.566	5.6	9.300		14.900	14.733	Q
4	Igor Radivilov (UKR)	5.6	9.300		14.900	5.6	8.900		14.500	14.700	Q
5	Jake Jarman (GBR)	6.0	9.266	0.100	15.166	5.6	8.633		14.233	14.699	Q
6	Carlos Yulo (PHI)	5.6	9.300	0.100	14.800	5.6	8.966		14.566	14.683	Q
7	Artur Davtyan (ARM)	5.6	9.033	0.100	14.533	5.6	9.200		14.800	14.666	Q
8	Mahdi Olfati (IRI)	5.6	9.066		14.666	5.6	8.900		14.500	14.583	Q
9	Asher Hong (USA)	6.0	8.800	0.100	14.700	5.6	8.933	0.100	14.433	14.566	R1
10	Adem Asil (TUR)	6.0	9.266		15.266	5.6	8.100		13.700	14.483	R2
11	Lee Jun-ho (KOR)	5.6	8.933		14.533	5.6	8.933	0.300	14.233	14.383	R3
12	Wataru Tanigawa (JPN)	5.2	9.100		14.300	5.6	8.500		14.100	14.200	–
13	Casimir Schmidt (NED)	5.6	8.600	0.300	13.900	5.6	8.800		14.400	14.150	–
14	Shek Wai Hung (HKG)	6.0	7.966	0.300	13.666	5.6	8.933		14.533	14.099	–
15	Kevin Penev (BUL)	5.4	8.900	0.300	14.000	5.2	8.900	0.100	14.000	14.000	–
16	Audrys Nin Reyes (DOM)	5.6	9.166		14.766	5.6	7.900	0.300	13.200	13.983	–
17	Rayderley Zapata (ESP)	5.6	8.700		14.300	5.6	7.866	0.300	13.166	13.733	–
18	Omar Mohamed (EGY)	5.2	7.800	0.300	12.700	4.8	7.866	0.300	12.366	12.533	–

Reserves

The reserves for the men's vault final were:

1. Asher Hong (USA)
2. Adem Asil (TUR)
3. Lee Jun-ho (KOR)

=== Final ===
Rank	Gymnast	Vault 1				Vault 2				Total
Rank	Gymnast	D Score	E Score	Penalty	Score 1	D Score	E Score	Penalty	Score 2	Total
1st place, gold medalist(s)	Carlos Yulo (PHI)	6.0	9.433		15.433	5.6	9.200		14.800	15.116
2nd place, silver medalist(s)	Artur Davtyan (ARM)	5.6	9.366		14.966	5.6	9.366		14.966	14.966
3rd place, bronze medalist(s)	Harry Hepworth (GBR)	5.6	9.233		14.833	5.6	9.466		15.066	14.949
4	Jake Jarman (GBR)	6.0	9.200	0.100	15.100	5.6	9.166		14.766	14.933
5	Aurel Benović (CRO)	5.6	9.400		15.000	5.6	9.200		14.800	14.900
6	Nazar Chepurnyi (UKR)	5.6	9.233		14.833	5.6	9.366		14.966	14.899
7	Mahdi Olfati (IRI)	5.6	8.866	0.300	14.166	5.6	8.866	0.100	14.366	14.266
8	Igor Radivilov (UKR)	5.6	9.300		14.900	5.6	7.933	0.100	13.433	14.166
