= Courtney Tulloch =

British artistic gymnast

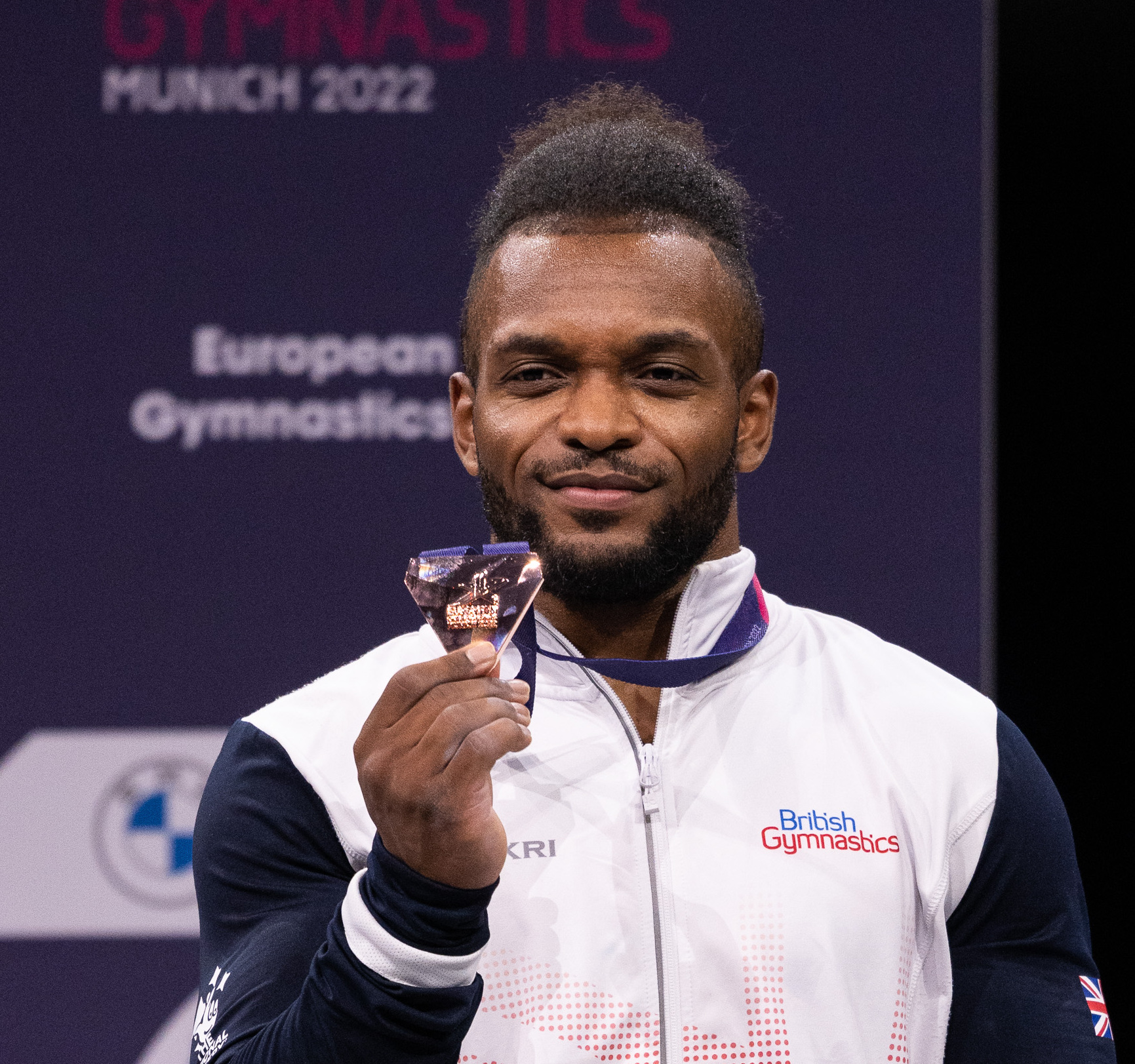
- Tulloch at the 2022 European Championships

Personal information
- Full name: Courtney James Matthew Winston Tulloch
- Born: 6 October 1995 (age 31) Lewisham, England
- Height: 163 cm (5 ft 4 in)

Gymnastics career
- Discipline: Men's artistic gymnastics
- Country represented: (United Kingdom) Great Britain; England; (2012–present)
- Club: South Essex Gymnastics Club
- Eponymous skills: Tulloch (still rings); Tulloch II (still rings)
Medal record
Men's artistic gymnastics
Representing Great Britain
World Championships
Bronze medal – third place	2022 Liverpool	Team
Bronze medal – third place	2022 Liverpool	Rings
European Championships
Gold medal – first place	2022 Munich	Team
Gold medal – first place	2026 Zagreb	Team
Silver medal – second place	2016 Bern	Team
Silver medal – second place	2017 Cluj-Napoca	Rings
Silver medal – second place	2018 Glasgow	Team
Silver medal – second place	2024 Rimini	Team
Bronze medal – third place	2018 Glasgow	Rings
Bronze medal – third place	2022 Munich	Rings
Bronze medal – third place	2023 Antalya	Team
FIG World Cup
Event	1st	2nd	3rd
Apparatus World Cup	1	1	1
World Challenge Cup	1	2	1
Total	2	3	2
Representing England
Commonwealth Games
Gold medal – first place	2018 Gold Coast	Team
Gold medal – first place	2018 Gold Coast	Rings
Gold medal – first place	2022 Birmingham	Team
Gold medal – first place	2022 Birmingham	Rings
Silver medal – second place	2018 Gold Coast	Vault

Courtney James Matthew Winston Tulloch (born 6 October 1995) is an English international artistic gymnast, representing Great Britain and England since 2012, and is a specialist in still rings and vault.

He became the first British gymnast ever to win a world medal on rings, a bronze, at the 2022 World Championships, having helped Great Britain to bronze, and Olympic qualification, in the team event days earlier. He was also part of both the gold medal-winning team at the 2022 and 2026 European Artistic Gymnastics Championships, and is a nine-time European medallist.

Additionally, Tulloch was back-to-back Commonwealth Games champion in the team event and on rings in 2018 and 2022, and a silver medallist on vault in 2018, representing England.

== Gymnastics career ==
Tulloch trains at South Essex Gymnastics Club under coaches Anthony Wise & Scott Hann. He used to train at Pegasus Gymnastics Club in Maidstone under coaches Ovi Rugina & Ionut Trandaburu. He is part of the Castore Sportswear Academy.

During his junior career, Tulloch was a two-time all-around champion at the UK School Games and won several titles on rings. He was also part of the Junior British team that won the European title at the 2012 European Championships in Montpellier, as well as winning a gold medal on the rings.

=== 2014 ===
In 2014, Tulloch won a silver medal at the Ljubljana World Challenge Cup on still rings. He was chosen to represent Great Britain at the 2014 World Gymnastics Championships in Nanning, China where he helped the men's team qualify to the final with performances on pommel horse, still rings and parallel bars. The team placed fourth, and Tulloch also placed sixth in the still rings final.

=== 2015 ===
In 2015 Tulloch was selected to attend the 2015 European Championships where he qualified for the still rings final, finishing eighth. He later competed at the Osijek World Challenge Cup and won bronze on still rings.

=== 2016 ===
Tulloch competed at the 2016 European Championships in Bern, alongside Daniel Purvis, Louis Smith, Kristian Thomas and Nile Wilson, where the team won silver and Tulloch finished fourth in the still rings final. This was his first European medal.

=== 2017 ===
In 2017, Tulloch won Britain's first major international rings medal with silver at the European Gymnastics in Cluj, Romania. Later he was selected to compete at the 2017 World Championships and qualified for the still rings final, placing eighth.

=== 2018 ===
Tulloch was selected to compete at the Commonwealth Games in Gold Coast, Australia. He took gold on still rings and also won gold with the men's team. On the vault, he won silver. Later at the 2018 European Championships in Glasgow, Tulloch won bronze on still rings and silver as part of the team.

=== 2019 ===
At the Baku World Cup, Tulloch took gold on the still rings. He competed at the 2019 European Championships, qualifying for the still rings and vault finals, and placing fourth and eighth respectively. Later that year he also competed at the Doha and Cottbus World Cups, qualifying for the still rings finals but placing eighth and sixth.

=== 2021 ===
Tulloch placed fifth in the vault final at the 2021 European Championships. He later won silver on vault at the Koper World Challenge Cup. Tulloch was then selected to represent Great Britain at the 2021 World Championships. He qualified for the still rings and vault finals, where he placed eighth and sixth.

=== 2022 ===
At the Cottbus World Cup Tulloch took bronze on still rings and finished sixth on vault. At the Varna World Challenge Cup Tulloch took silver on still rings and bronze on vault. He was then selected into the English team that won a third consecutive gold (Tullochs second) in the team competition at the 2022 Commonwealth Games in Birmingham. He also retained his gold title on still rings.

Tulloch was then selected into the team for the 2022 European Championships, alongside James Hall, Joe Fraser, Jake Jarman and Giarnni Regini-Moran where the y took gold. Individually, Tulloch also took bronze in the still rings final and finished seventh on vault.

At the 2022 World Championships, Tulloch, Joe Fraser, James Hall, Jake Jarman and Giarnni Regini-Moran took team bronze. This was Britain's second world medal in the team event and also confirmed their spot at the 2024 Paris Olympics. Tulloch also took bronze in the still rings final.

=== 2023 ===
Tulloch was part of the men's team which took bronze at the 2023 European Championships which also included Jake Jarman, Joshua Nathan, Adam Tobin and Luke Whitehouse. He then competed alongside Max Whitlock, James Hall, Jake Jarman and Harry Hepworth at the 2023 World Championships. This was Tullochs fifth World Championships and the team finished in fourth place. He later took gold on still rings at the Paris World Challenge Cup.

=== 2024 ===
In 2024 Tulloch attended the Cairo and Cottbus World Cups, reaching the still rings finals on both occasions, finishing eighth and sixth respectively. He next attended the 2024 European Championships where the team finished second and individually he placed sixth on still rings. In June, Tulloch was named as a reserve for the 2024 Summer Olympic team and would miss out on his third consecutive games.

=== 2025 ===
Tulloch was selected to represent Britain for his tenth European Championships as an individual athlete, where he finished fifth in the rings final alongside teammate Harry Hepworth. In late September Tulloch was selected to represent Great Britain at the 2025 World Championships.

== Competitive history ==
Competitive history of Courtney Tulloch
Year	Event	Team	AA	FX	PH	SR	VT	PB	HB
2012	British Championships					1st place, gold medalist(s)			
2014	Ljubljana World Challenge Cup					2nd place, silver medalist(s)			
2014	World Championships	4				6			
2015
2015	British Championships					1st place, gold medalist(s)			
2015	European Championships					8			
2015	Osijek World Challenge Cup					3rd place, bronze medalist(s)			
2016	British Championships					1st place, gold medalist(s)			
2016	European Championships	2nd place, silver medalist(s)				4			
2017	British Championships					1st place, gold medalist(s)			
2017	European Championships					2nd place, silver medalist(s)			
2017	World Championships					8			
2018	Commonwealth Games	1st place, gold medalist(s)				1st place, gold medalist(s)	2nd place, silver medalist(s)		
2018	European Championships	2nd place, silver medalist(s)				3rd place, bronze medalist(s)			
2018	Cottbus World Cup					7			
2019	Melbourne World Cup					5			
2019	Baku World Cup					1st place, gold medalist(s)			
2019	European Championships					5	8		
2019	Doha World Cup					8			
2019	Cottbus World Cup					6			
2020	Melbourne World Cup					5			
2020	Baku World Cup					5	6		
2021	British Championships					1st place, gold medalist(s)			
2021	European Championships						5		
2021	Koper World Challenge Cup					6	2nd place, silver medalist(s)		
2021	World Championships					8	6		
2022	Cottbus World Cup					3rd place, bronze medalist(s)	6		
2022	British Championships					1st place, gold medalist(s)			
2022	Varna World Challenge Cup					2nd place, silver medalist(s)	3rd place, bronze medalist(s)		
2022	Commonwealth Games	1st place, gold medalist(s)				1st place, gold medalist(s)			
2022	European Championships	1st place, gold medalist(s)				3rd place, bronze medalist(s)	7		
2022	World Championships	3rd place, bronze medalist(s)				3rd place, bronze medalist(s)			
2023	British Championships					1st place, gold medalist(s)			
2023	European Championships	3rd place, bronze medalist(s)				6			
2023	World Championships	4							
2023	Paris World Challenge Cup					1st place, gold medalist(s)			
2024	Cairo World Cup					8			
2024	Cottbus World Cup					6			
2024	British Championships		3rd place, bronze medalist(s)			1st place, gold medalist(s)		3rd place, bronze medalist(s)	
2024	European Championships	2nd place, silver medalist(s)				6			
2025	Cottbus World Cup								
2025	British Championships					1st place, gold medalist(s)			
2025	European Championships					5		5	
2025	World Championships					R1			
2026	Antalya World Cup					2nd place, silver medalist(s)			
2026	British Championships					2nd place, silver medalist(s)		3rd place, bronze medalist(s)	
2026	European Championships	1st place, gold medalist(s)				4			
2026	World Championships	4				7			

== Eponymous skills ==
Tulloch is credited with two eponymous skills on rings. The Tulloch and Tulloch II.

Apparatus	Name	Description	Difficulty	Competition completed
Still Rings	Tulloch	Azarian to inverted Swallow (2 s.)	F (0.6)	2014 World Championships
Still Rings	Tulloch II	From hang vertical pull up, slowly with straight arms through cross to inverted swallow (2 s.)	G (0.7)	2018 European Championships
