= Nazar Chepurnyi =

Ukrainian artistic gymnast (born 2002)

Nazar Chepurnyi Назар Чепурний
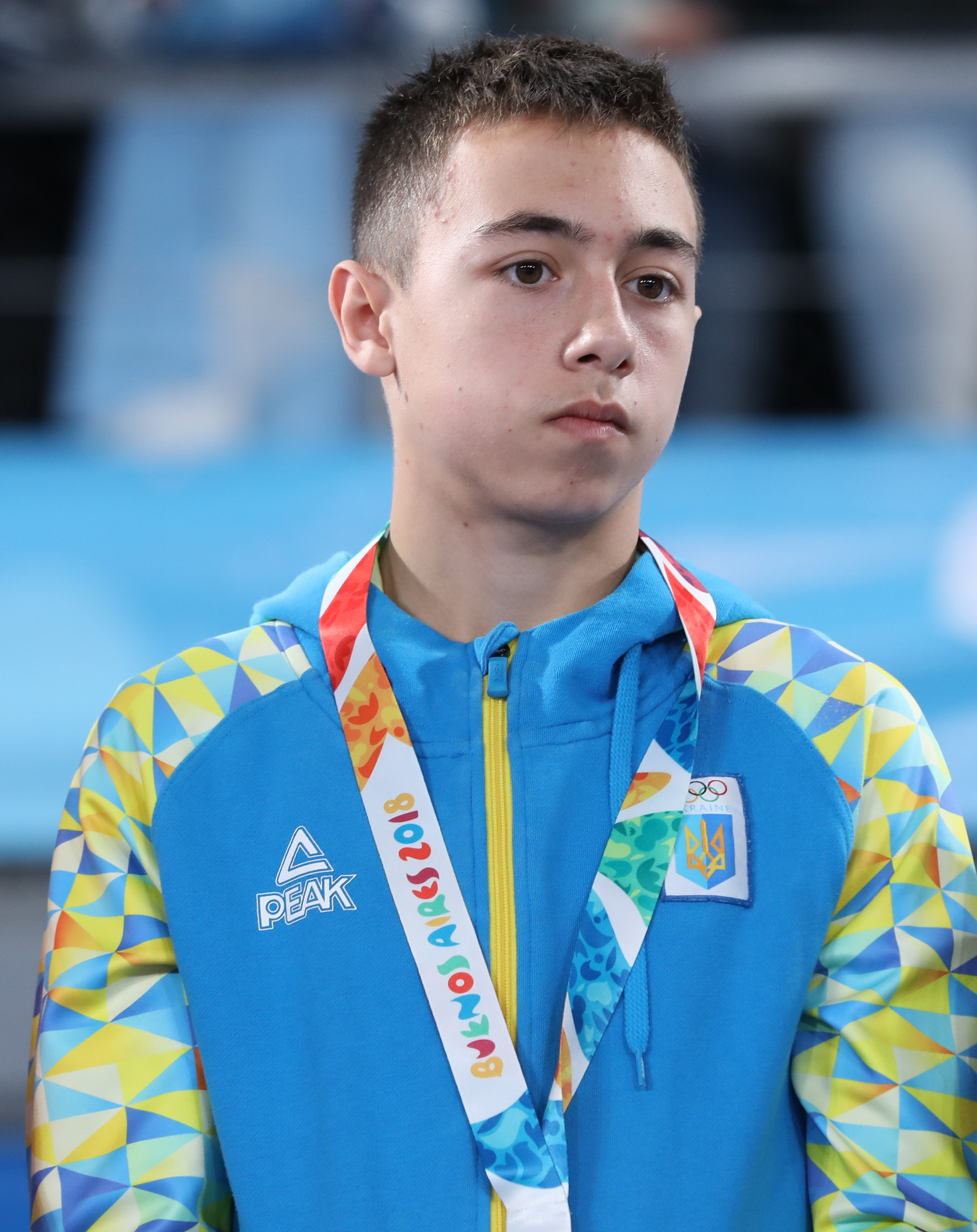
- Chepurnyi in 2018

Personal information
- Full name: Nazar Vyacheslavovich Chepurnyi
- Born: 3 September 2002 (age 24) Cherkasy, Ukraine

Gymnastics career
- Discipline: Men's artistic gymnastics
- Country represented: Ukraine; (2016–present)
- Club: Olympia Youth Sports School
- Head coach: Gennady Sartynskyi
Medal record
Representing Ukraine
Men's artistic gymnastics
World Championships
Bronze medal – third place	2023 Antwerp	Vault
Bronze medal – third place	2025 Jakarta	Vault
European Championships
Gold medal – first place	2024 Rimini	Team
Gold medal – first place	2026 Zagreb	Vault
Bronze medal – third place	2024 Rimini	Vault
Bronze medal – third place	2025 Leipzig	Vault
World University Games
Gold medal – first place	2021 Chengdu	Vault
Junior World Championships
Gold medal – first place	2019 Győr	Horizontal Bar
Silver medal – second place	2019 Győr	Team
Bronze medal – third place	2019 Győr	Floor
Youth Olympic Games
Silver medal – second place	2018 Buenos Aires	Vault
FIG World Cup
Event	1st	2nd	3rd
World Cup	6	9	3
World Challenge Cup	4	2	1
Total	10	11	4
Representing (International Olympic Committee) Mixed-NOCs
Youth Olympic Games
Gold medal – first place	2018 Buenos Aires	Mixed team

Nazar Vyacheslavovich Chepurnyi (Ukrainian: Назар Вячеславович Чепурний; born 3 September 2002) is a Ukrainian artistic gymnast. He represented Ukraine at the 2024 Summer Olympics. He claimed the bronze medal on vault at both the 2023 and the 2025 World Championships. He was part of the gold medal winning team at the 2024 European Championships and the silver medal winning team at the 2019 Junior World Championships. Individually on vault he also is the 2021 World University Games champion, 2018 Youth Olympic silver medalist, and the 2024 European bronze medalist. Additionally he is the 2019 Junior World champion on horizontal bar.

== Junior gymnastics career ==
=== 2016 ===
Chepurnyi competed at the junior European Championships held in Bern, Switzerland.

=== 2018 ===
Chepurnyi competed at the Ukraine International Cup where he placed first in the all-around. He competed at the junior European Championships alongside Illia Kovtun, Vladyslav Hrynevych, Dmytro Shyshko, and Roman Vashchenko where he helped Ukraine finish fifth as a team; he finished ninth in the all-around. Chepurnyi next competed at Gymnasiade in Marrakesh. He finished second in the all-around behind Diogo Soares and third on rings but won the gold medal on horizontal bar. He also won the bronze medal in the rings and the silver medal in the all-around event.

Chepurnyi was selected to represent Ukraine at the 2018 Youth Olympic Games. He was part of the mixed multi-discipline team that won gold. He qualified to four individual finals: the all-around, floor exercise, vault, and parallel bars. He finished sixth in the all-around and fourth on both floor exercise and parallel bars. He won the silver medal on vault behind Brandon Briones.

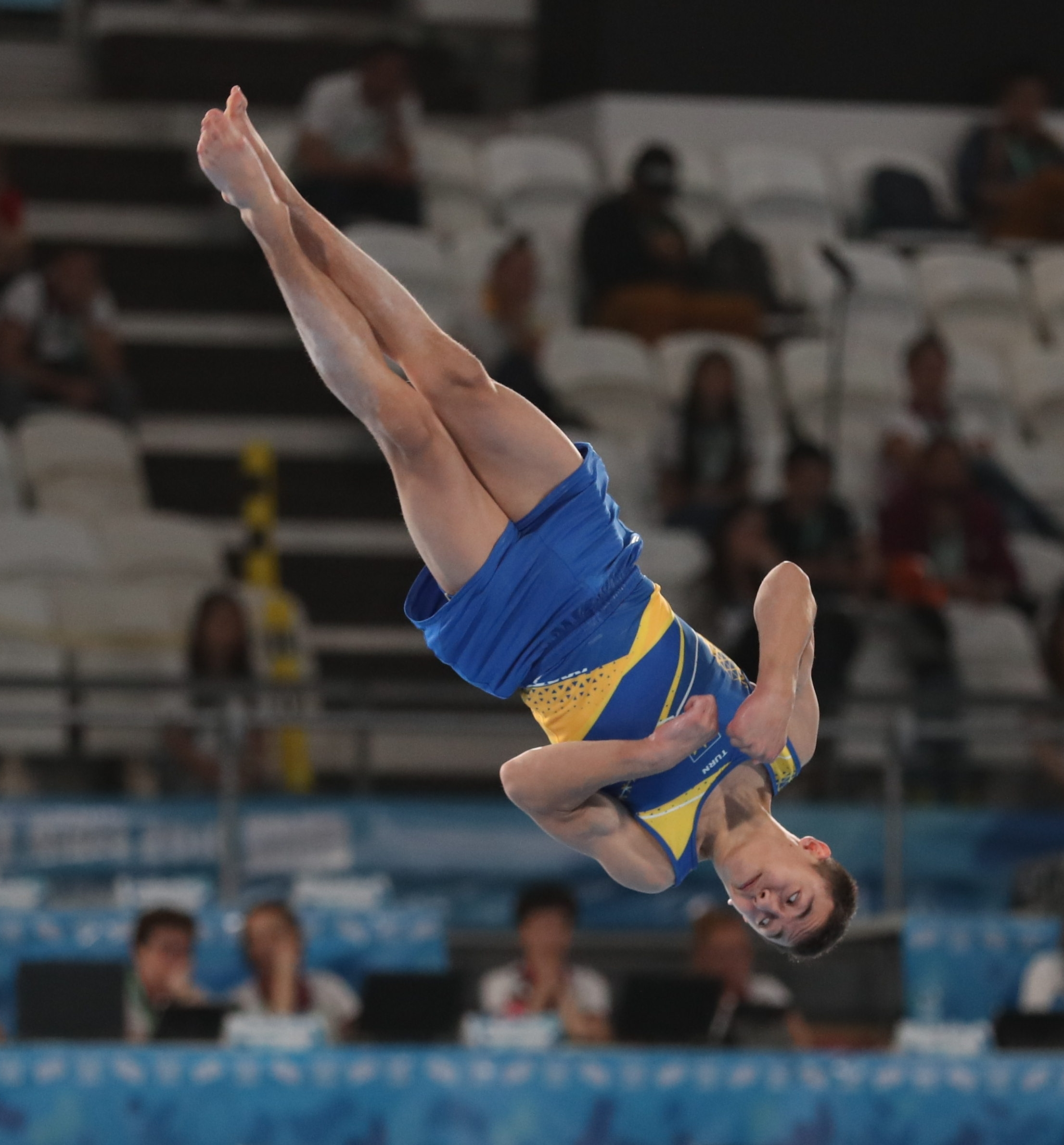
Floor exercise

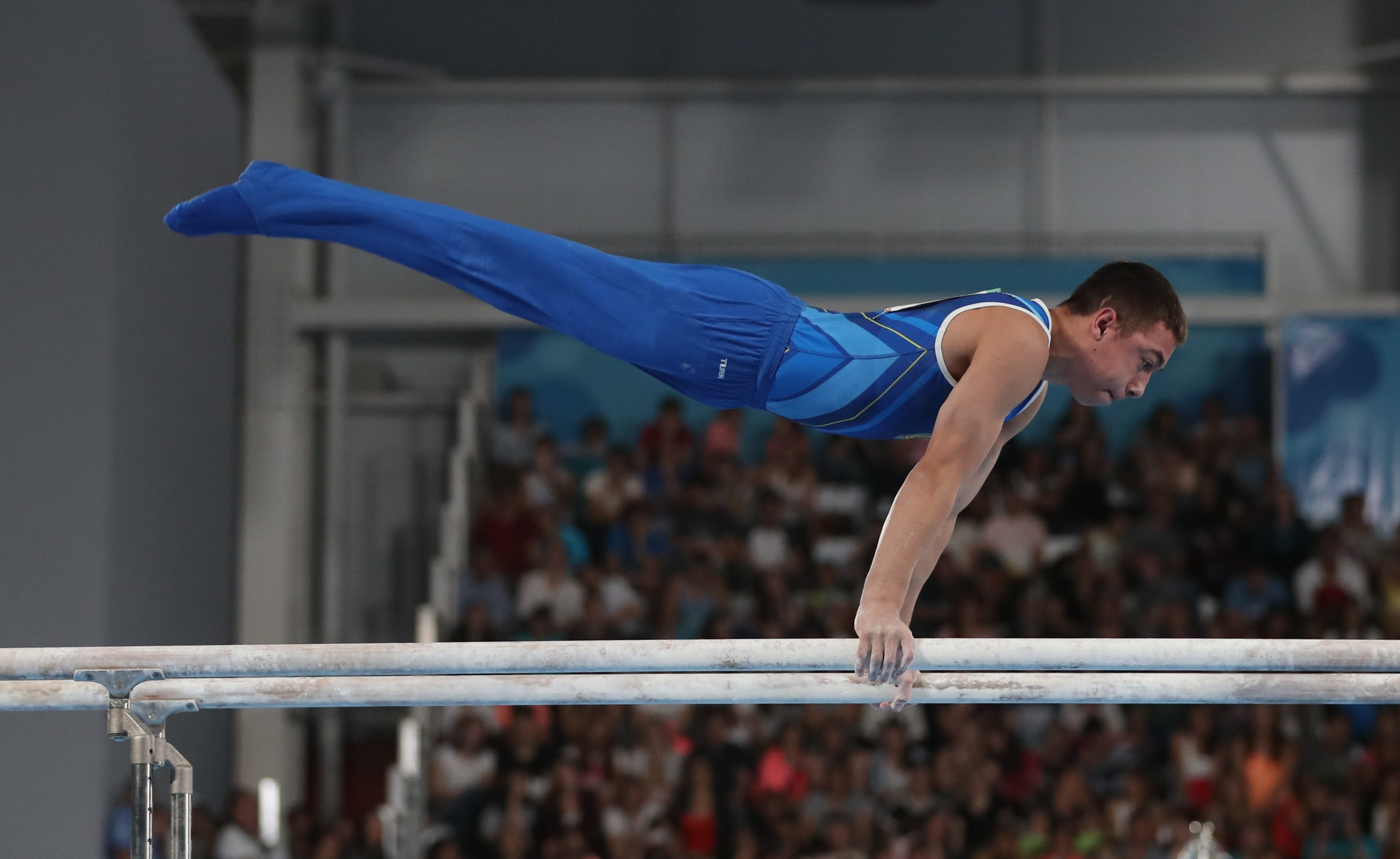
Parallel bars

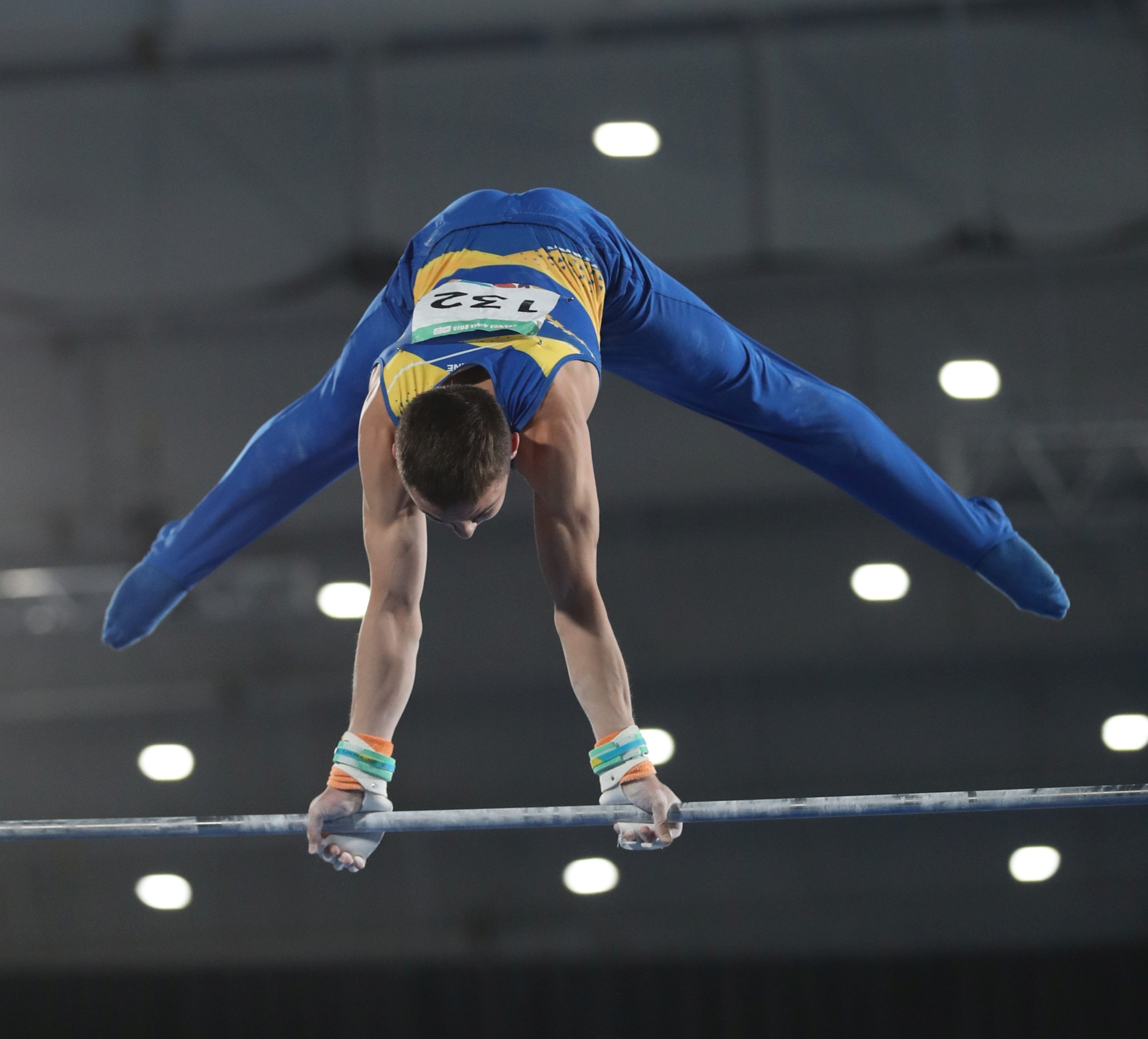
Horizontal bar

Nazar Chepurnyi at the 2018 Youth Olympic Games

=== 2019 ===
Chepurnyi competed at the Ukraine International Cup and the Ukrainian Championships where he finished second in the all-around behind Illia Kovtun. He was selected to compete at the inaugural junior World Championships in Győr alongside Kovtun and Volodymyr Kostiuk. While there Chepurnyi helped Ukraine finish second behind Japan and individually he placed seventh in the all-around. He qualified to three event finals: floor exercise, parallel bars, and horizontal bar. He won the bronze on floor exercise behind Ryu Sung-hyun and Félix Dolci, finished seventh on parallel bars, and won the gold medal on the horizontal bar. He next competed at the European Youth Olympic Festival in Baku, Azerbaijan. He, alongside Kovtun and Kostiuk, won the gold medal in the team competition. Chepurnyi placed sixth in the all-around and fourth on vault but won three individual medals: gold on floor exercise and pommel horse and silver on rings behind Mukhammadzhon Iakubov.

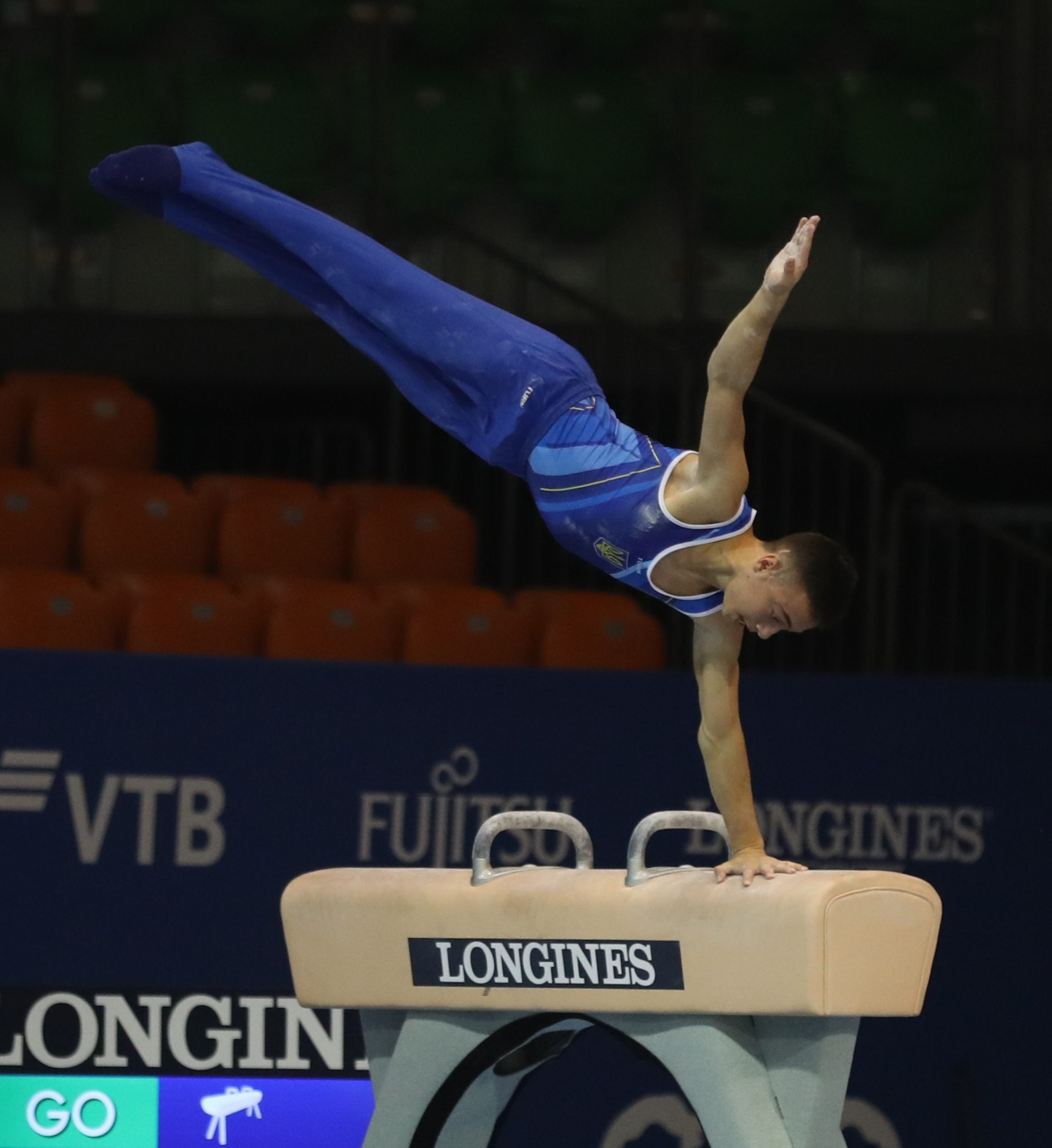
Pommel horse

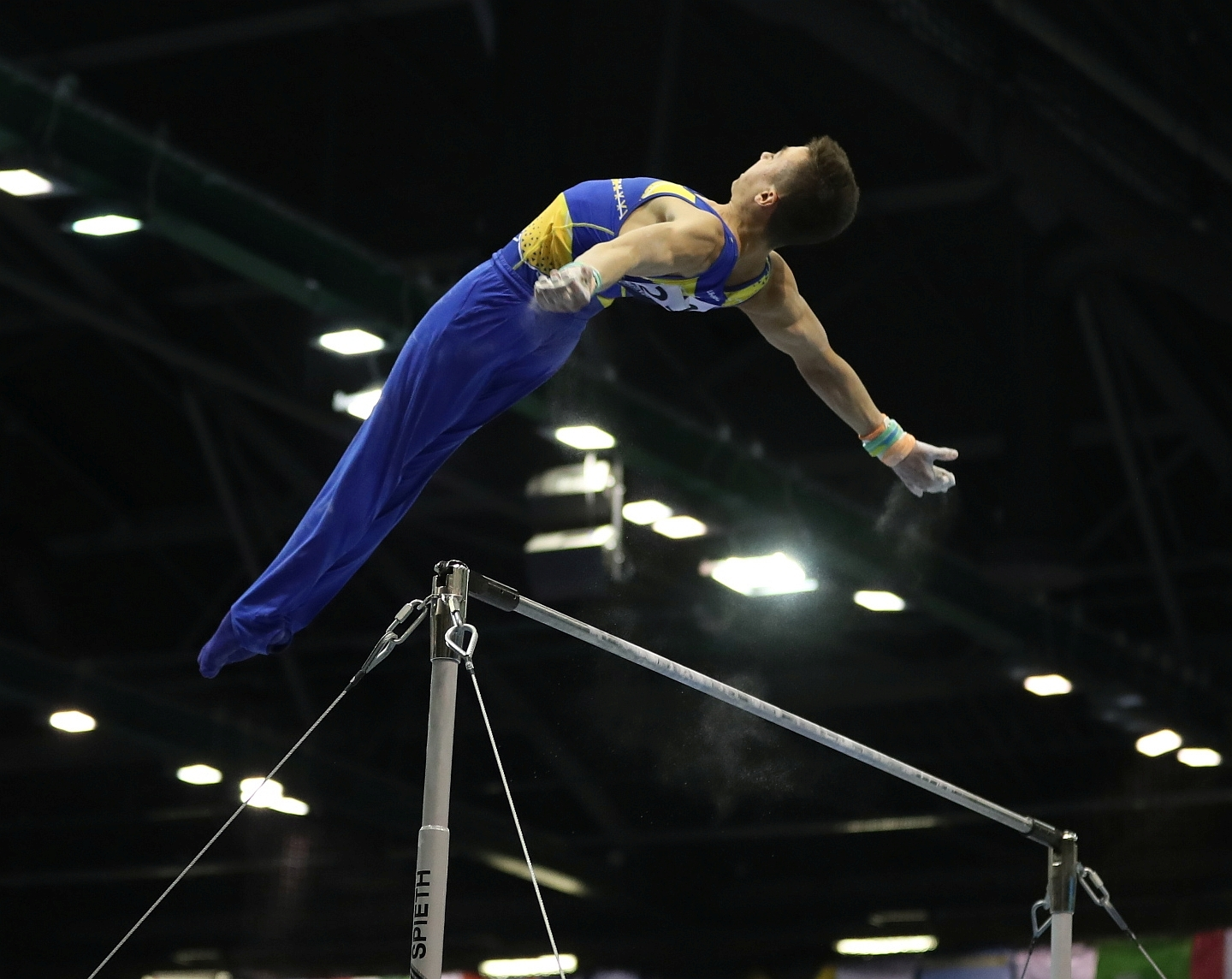
Horizontal bar

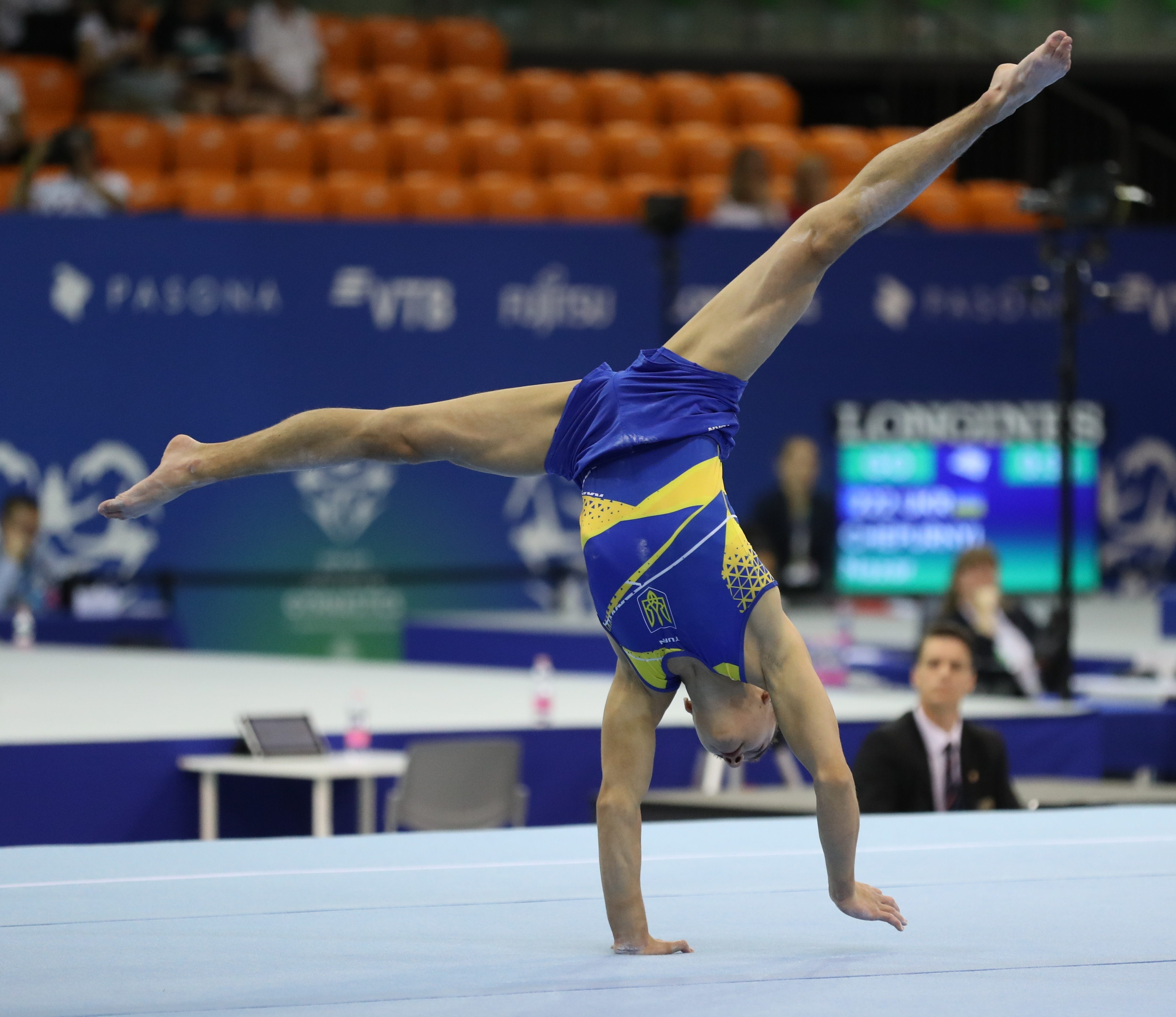
Floor exercise

Nazar Chepurnyi at the 2019 Junior World Championships

== Senior gymnastics career ==
=== 2021 ===
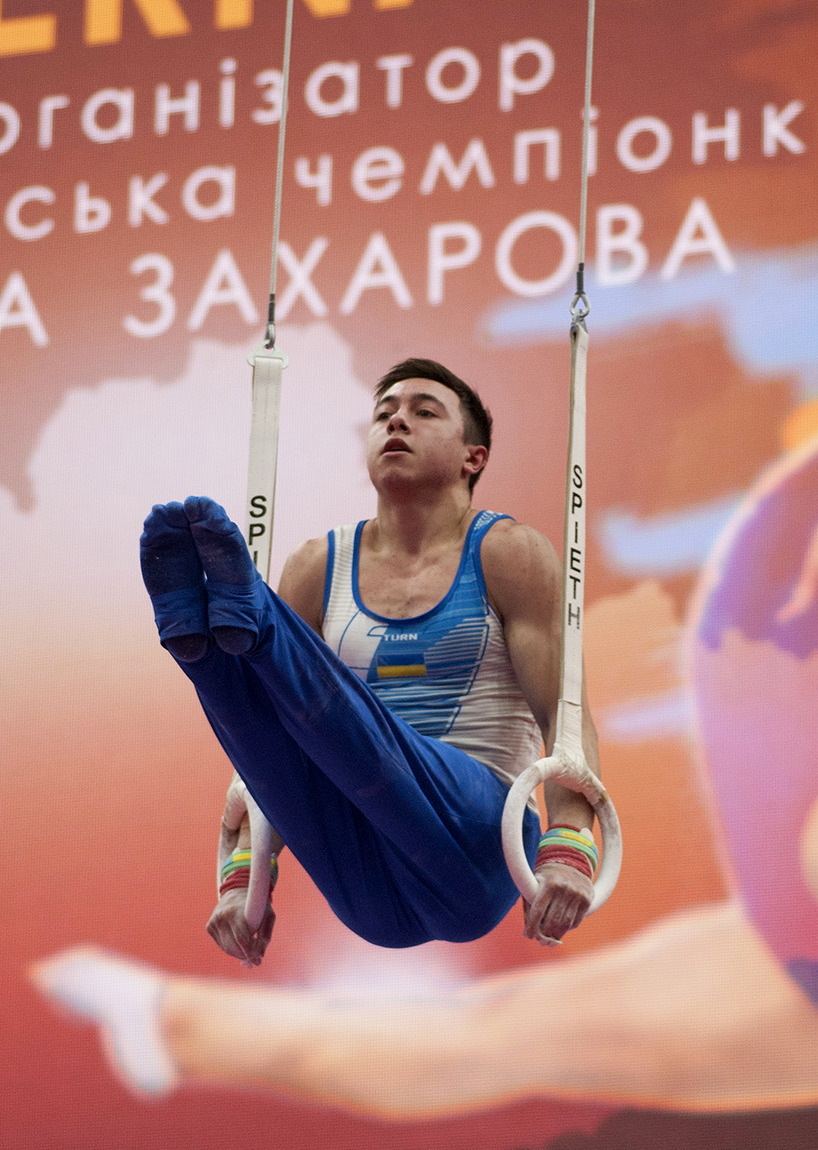
Chepurnyi competing at the 2021 Ukraine International Cup

Chepurnyi competed at the World Challenge Cups in Varna and Cairo. He won the gold medal on vault at each and also won a bronze medal on pommel horse in Cairo. He ended up winning the 2020–2021 series title on vault. Chepurnyi was selected to compete at the World Championships; he qualified to the vault final in first place. However, during the event final he crashed his second vault and finished seventh.

=== 2022 ===
Chepurnyi competed at the Cottbus World Cup in February. On the first day of qualifications Russia launched a full-scale invasion of Chepurnyi's home country of Ukraine. Despite news of the war he won silver on vault behind Artur Davtyan. Chepurnyi next competed at the Doha World Cup where he once again won silver on vault behind Davtyan. At the Cairo World Cup Chepurnyi won his third consecutive silver medal on vault behind Davtyan. Chepurnyi finished the World Cup circuit competing at the Baku World Cup where he won his long-awaited gold on vault.

=== 2023 ===
In April Chepurnyi competed at the Cairo World Cup where he won silver on vault behind Artur Davtyan. In August he competed at the World University Games where he helped Ukraine finish 11th as a team. Individually he won gold on vault. At the 2023 World Championships in Antwerp Chepurnyi helped Ukraine finish twelfth as a team during qualifications which earned them a team berth to the 2024 Olympic Games. Individually Chepurnyi qualified to the vault final. During the final earned a score of 14.766 to win the bronze medal behind Jake Jarman of Great Britain and Khoi Young of the United States.

In December Chepurnyi was awarded with the title Merited Master of Sports of Ukraine for his achievements at the World Championships.

=== 2024 ===
Chepurnyi started the year competing at the World Cups in Cairo and Baku; he won silver and gold on vault respectively. He competed at the 2024 European Championships alongside Illia Kovtun, Igor Radivilov, Radomyr Stelmakh, and Oleg Verniaiev; together they qualified to the team final in first place. During apparatus finals Chepurnyi won bronze on vault behind Jake Jarman and Artur Davtyan. During the team final Chepurnyi contributed scores on floor exercise, vault, and parallel bars towards Ukraine's first place finish.

Chepurnyi competed at the 2024 Olympic Games alongside Kovtun, Radivilov, Stelmakh, and Verniaiev. During the qualification round he helped Ukraine qualify to the team final and individually he qualified to the vault final. During the team final Chepurnyi contributed scores on floor exercise and vault towards Ukraine's fifth place finish. He finished sixth on vault, five-hundredths (0.05) of a point behind bronze medalist Harry Hepworth.

=== 2025 ===
Chepurnyi competed at the World Cups in Cottbus, Baku, Doha, and Cairo. He won one gold and three silvers on vault, one gold and one silver on parallel bars, and two bronze medals on floor exercise. At the 2025 European Championships Chepurnyi qualified to the all-around, floor exercise, and vault finals; he won bronze on vault behind Artur Davtyan and Jake Jarman and placed fourth on floor exercise and fourteenth in the all-around.

== Competitive history ==
Competitive history of Nazar Chepurnyi at the junior level
Year	Event	Team	AA	FX	PH	SR	VT	PB	HB
2014	Kyiv Open Championships		2nd place, silver medalist(s)						
2015	Ukrainian Championships	1st place, gold medalist(s)	1st place, gold medalist(s)						
2015	«Dnipro Waves» Championships		1st place, gold medalist(s)						
2015	Beresh Cup		1st place, gold medalist(s)						
2016
2016	European Junior Championships	7	10		5			6	
2016	International Junior Team Cup	9	1st place, gold medalist(s)	1st place, gold medalist(s)	1st place, gold medalist(s)	1st place, gold medalist(s)	1st place, gold medalist(s)	1st place, gold medalist(s)	2nd place, silver medalist(s)
2017	Barborka Cup	1st place, gold medalist(s)	4						
2017	Ukraine International Cup	2nd place, silver medalist(s)	1st place, gold medalist(s)	2nd place, silver medalist(s)		1st place, gold medalist(s)		2nd place, silver medalist(s)	
2017	Junior Japan International		11		5	6			
2018	Ukraine International Cup	3rd place, bronze medalist(s)	1st place, gold medalist(s)	1st place, gold medalist(s)	1st place, gold medalist(s)	1st place, gold medalist(s)	1st place, gold medalist(s)	2nd place, silver medalist(s)	1st place, gold medalist(s)
2018	European Junior Championships	5	9						
2018	Gymnasiade		2nd place, silver medalist(s)	4		3rd place, bronze medalist(s)	4		1st place, gold medalist(s)
2018	President's Cup		2nd place, silver medalist(s)	2nd place, silver medalist(s)	4	3rd place, bronze medalist(s)	3rd place, bronze medalist(s)	3rd place, bronze medalist(s)	3rd place, bronze medalist(s)
2018	Youth Summer Olympics Qualifier		12						
2018	Youth Summer Olympics	1st place, gold medalist(s)	6	4			2nd place, silver medalist(s)	4	
2018	Swiss Cup Juniors	1st place, gold medalist(s)	1st place, gold medalist(s)						
2019	Ukraine International Cup		2nd place, silver medalist(s)	1st place, gold medalist(s)	1st place, gold medalist(s)	1st place, gold medalist(s)	1st place, gold medalist(s)	1st place, gold medalist(s)	
2019	Ukrainian Championships		2nd place, silver medalist(s)	1st place, gold medalist(s)	1st place, gold medalist(s)	1st place, gold medalist(s)	1st place, gold medalist(s)	2nd place, silver medalist(s)	3rd place, bronze medalist(s)
2019	Junior World Championships	2nd place, silver medalist(s)	7	3rd place, bronze medalist(s)				7	1st place, gold medalist(s)
2019	Euro Youth Olympic Festival	1st place, gold medalist(s)	6	1st place, gold medalist(s)	1st place, gold medalist(s)	2nd place, silver medalist(s)	4		

Competitive history of Nazar Chepurnyi at the senior level
Year	Event	Team	AA	FX	PH	SR	VT	PB	HB
2020	Ukrainian Championships		29	3rd place, bronze medalist(s)			2nd place, silver medalist(s)		
2021	Ukrainian Championships		5		6		4		
2021	Ukraine International Cup	1st place, gold medalist(s)	7			3rd place, bronze medalist(s)	1st place, gold medalist(s)		
2021	Varna Challenge Cup						1st place, gold medalist(s)		
2021	Cairo Challenge Cup				3rd place, bronze medalist(s)		1st place, gold medalist(s)		4
2021	World Championships						7		
2021	Sport School Championships	1st place, gold medalist(s)					1st place, gold medalist(s)		2nd place, silver medalist(s)
2022	Cottbus World Cup						2nd place, silver medalist(s)		
2022	Doha World Cup						2nd place, silver medalist(s)		
2022	Cairo World Cup						2nd place, silver medalist(s)	7	
2022	Baku World Cup						1st place, gold medalist(s)		
2023	Ukrainian Championships					4	1st place, gold medalist(s)		
2023	Cairo World Cup						2nd place, silver medalist(s)		
2023	World University Games	11					1st place, gold medalist(s)		
2023	Mersin Challenge Cup						1st place, gold medalist(s)	2nd place, silver medalist(s)	
2023	World Championships	12					3rd place, bronze medalist(s)		
2024	Cairo World Cup						2nd place, silver medalist(s)		
2024	Baku World Cup						1st place, gold medalist(s)		
2024	European Championships	1st place, gold medalist(s)					3rd place, bronze medalist(s)	6	
2024	Olympic Games	5					6		
2025	Cottbus World Cup						2nd place, silver medalist(s)	2nd place, silver medalist(s)	
2025	Baku World Cup			3rd place, bronze medalist(s)			1st place, gold medalist(s)	5	
2025	Doha World Cup			5			2nd place, silver medalist(s)	1st place, gold medalist(s)	
2025	Cairo World Cup			3rd place, bronze medalist(s)			2nd place, silver medalist(s)	8	
2025	European Championships	11	14	4			3rd place, bronze medalist(s)		
2025	World University Games	11					4		
2025	World Championships	—N/a					3rd place, bronze medalist(s)		
2026	Cottbus World Cup						1st place, gold medalist(s)		
2026	Baku World Cup						1st place, gold medalist(s)	4	
2026	DTB Pokal Team Challenge	10					1st place, gold medalist(s)	4	
2026	Osijek World Cup						3rd place, bronze medalist(s)		
2026	European Championships						1st place, gold medalist(s)	6	
2026	Paris World Challenge Cup						1st place, gold medalist(s)	2nd place, silver medalist(s)	
2026	World Championships	21					4		
