= 2024 European Men's Artistic Gymnastics Championships =

- Venue: Rimini Fiera
- Location: Rimini, Italy
- Start date: 24 April 2024
- End date: 28 April 2024
- Competitors: 316 from 38 nations

The 36th European Men's Artistic Gymnastics Championships was held in Rimini, Italy on 24–28 April 2024. The competition served as Olympic qualification for one individual berth.

== Schedule ==
Date	Session	Time	Subdivisions
Wednesday, 24 April
Wednesday, 24 April	Senior All-Around Final and Qualification for Team & Individual Apparatus Finals	10:00 – 12:50	Subdivision 1
Wednesday, 24 April	Senior All-Around Final and Qualification for Team & Individual Apparatus Finals	13:53 – 16:44	Subdivision 2
Wednesday, 24 April	Senior All-Around Final and Qualification for Team & Individual Apparatus Finals	17:07 – 19:56	Subdivision 3
Thursday, 25 April	Junior Team Finals and Qualification for Individual All-Around & Apparatus Finals	10:00 – 12:50	Subdivision 1
Thursday, 25 April	Junior Team Finals and Qualification for Individual All-Around & Apparatus Finals	14:00 – 16:50	Subdivision 2
Thursday, 25 April	Junior Team Finals and Qualification for Individual All-Around & Apparatus Finals	17:30 – 20:20	Subdivision 3
Friday, 26 April	Senior Individual Apparatus Finals	18:00 – 20:30	Floor, Pommel horse, Rings, Vault, Parallel bars, Horizontal bar
Saturday, 27 April	Junior Individual Apparatus Finals	10:00 – 13:00	Floor, Pommel horse, Rings, Vault, Parallel bars, Horizontal bar
Saturday, 27 April	Senior Individual Apparatus Finals	16:30 – 19:00	Floor, Pommel horse, Rings, Vault, Parallel bars, Horizontal bar
Sunday, 28 April	Junior All-Around Final	10:00 – 12:45	Top 24 from qualifications
Sunday, 28 April	Senior Team Final	14:45 – 17:15	Top 8 from qualifications
All times listed in local time (UTC+01:00).

== Medals summary ==
=== Medalists ===
Event	Gold	Silver	Bronze
Senior
Team	Ukraine; Nazar Chepurnyi; Illia Kovtun; Igor Radivilov; Radomyr Stelmakh; Oleg Verniaiev	(United Kingdom) Great Britain; Joe Fraser; James Hall; Harry Hepworth; Jake Jarman; Courtney Tulloch	Italy; Yumin Abbadini; Lorenzo Minh Casali; Matteo Levantesi; Marco Lodadio; Mario Macchiati
All-around	Marios Georgiou; Cyprus	Oleg Verniaiev; Ukraine	Yumin Abbadini; Italy
Floor	Luke Whitehouse; Great Britain	Artem Dolgopyat; Israel	Krisztofer Mészáros; Hungary
Pommel horse	Rhys McClenaghan; Ireland	Loran de Munck; Netherlands	Marios Georgiou; Cyprus
Rings	Eleftherios Petrounias; Greece	Nikita Simonov; Azerbaijan	Adem Asil; Turkey
Vault	Jake Jarman; Great Britain	Artur Davtyan; Armenia	Nazar Chepurnyi; Ukraine
Parallel bars	Illia Kovtun; Ukraine	Marios Georgiou; Cyprus	Noe Seifert; Switzerland
Horizontal bar	Illia Kovtun; Ukraine	Robert Tvorogal; Lithuania	Marios Georgiou; Cyprus
Junior
Team	(United Kingdom) Great Britain; Uzair Chowdhury; Zakaine Fawzi-McCaffrey; Gabriel Langton; Evan McPhillips; Sol Scott	Italy; Manuel Berettera; Tommaso Brugnami; Pietro Mazzola; Simone Speranza; Diego Vazzola	France; Elias Brèche; Nathan Camilleri; Anthony Mansard; Karim Mangala-Bima; Alan Moullec
All-around	Anthony Mansard; France	Tommaso Brugnami; Italy	Gabriel Langton; Great Britain
Floor	Tommaso Brugnami; Italy	Anthony Mansard; France	Alec Moullec; France
Pommel horse	Hamlet Manukyan; Armenia	David Ivanov; Bulgaria	Mamikon Khachatryan; Armenia
Rings	Tommaso Brugnami; Italy	Gabriel Langton; Great Britain	Vincent Lindpointner; Austria
Vault	Sol Scott; Great Britain	Tommaso Brugnami; Italy	Sergio David Kovacs; Spain
Parallel bars	Uzair Chowdhury; Great Britain	Anthony Mansard; France Jonas Eder; Germany Sviatoslav Shved; Ukraine	None awarded
Horizontal bar	Anthony Mansard; France	Kyano Schepers; Belgium	Manuel Berettera; Italy

=== Medal standings ===
==== Overall ====
Rank	Nation	Gold	Silver	Bronze	Total
1	Great Britain	5	2	1	8
2	Ukraine	3	2	1	6
3	Italy*	2	3	3	8
4	France	2	2	2	6
5	Cyprus	1	1	2	4
6	Armenia	1	1	1	3
7	Greece	1	0	0	1
7	Ireland	1	0	0	1
9	Azerbaijan	0	1	0	1
9	Belgium	0	1	0	1
9	Bulgaria	0	1	0	1
9	Germany	0	1	0	1
9	Israel	0	1	0	1
9	Lithuania	0	1	0	1
9	Netherlands	0	1	0	1
16	Austria	0	0	1	1
16	Hungary	0	0	1	1
16	Spain	0	0	1	1
16	Switzerland	0	0	1	1
16	Turkey	0	0	1	1
Totals (20 entries)		16	18	15	49

==== Senior ====
* Host nation (Italy)

Rank	Nation	Gold	Silver	Bronze	Total
1	Ukraine	3	1	1	5
2	Great Britain	2	1	0	3
3	Cyprus	1	1	2	4
4	Greece	1	0	0	1
4	Ireland	1	0	0	1
6	Armenia	0	1	0	1
6	Azerbaijan	0	1	0	1
6	Israel	0	1	0	1
6	Lithuania	0	1	0	1
6	Netherlands	0	1	0	1
11	Italy*	0	0	2	2
12	Hungary	0	0	1	1
12	Switzerland	0	0	1	1
12	Turkey	0	0	1	1
Totals (14 entries)		8	8	8	24

==== Junior ====
* Host nation (Italy)

Rank	Nation	Gold	Silver	Bronze	Total
1	Great Britain	3	1	1	5
2	Italy*	2	3	1	6
3	France	2	2	2	6
4	Armenia	1	0	1	2
5	Belgium	0	1	0	1
5	Bulgaria	0	1	0	1
5	Germany	0	1	0	1
5	Ukraine	0	1	0	1
9	Austria	0	0	1	1
9	Spain	0	0	1	1
Totals (10 entries)		8	10	7	25

== Senior results ==
=== Team ===
Oldest and youngest competitors

	Name	Country	Date of birth	Age
Youngest	Radomyr Stelmakh	Ukraine	18 August 2005	18 years, 8 months and 10 days
Oldest	Marco Lodadio	Italy	24 March 1992	32 years, 1 month and 4 days

Rank	Team	Floor (gymnastics)	Pommel horse	Rings (gymnastics)	Vault (gymnastics)	Parallel bars	Horizontal bar	Total
1st place, gold medalist(s)	Ukraine	41.033	43.899	41.866	42.499	44.899	41.566	255.762
1st place, gold medalist(s)	Illia Kovtun		14.966	13.266		15.800	14.400	255.762
1st place, gold medalist(s)	Oleg Verniaiev	14.000	15.200	14.100	13.066	14.833	13.333	255.762
1st place, gold medalist(s)	Igor Radivilov			14.500	14.800			255.762
1st place, gold medalist(s)	Nazar Chepurnyi	13.500			14.633	14.266		255.762
1st place, gold medalist(s)	Radomyr Stelmakh	13.533	13.733				13.833	255.762
2nd place, silver medalist(s)	Great Britain	42.566	42.032	41.866	45.133	43.533	40.299	255.429
2nd place, silver medalist(s)	Joe Fraser		14.500			14.800	13.133	255.429
2nd place, silver medalist(s)	Harry Hepworth			14.500	15.000			255.429
2nd place, silver medalist(s)	Jake Jarman	14.600	14.066	12.866	15.500	14.133	13.366	255.429
2nd place, silver medalist(s)	Courtney Tulloch	13.933		14.500	14.633			255.429
2nd place, silver medalist(s)	James Hall	14.033	13.466			14.600	13.800	255.429
3rd place, bronze medalist(s)	Italy	41.666	42.266	41.332	42.832	43.032	41.432	252.560
3rd place, bronze medalist(s)	Yumin Abbadini	14.266	14.400	13.266	13.866		14.333	252.560
3rd place, bronze medalist(s)	Lorenzo Minh Casali	14.000	13.600	13.666	14.600	14.066		252.560
3rd place, bronze medalist(s)	Matteo Levantesi					14.466	13.833	252.560
3rd place, bronze medalist(s)	Marco Lodadio			14.400				252.560
3rd place, bronze medalist(s)	Mario Macchiati	13.400	14.266		14.366	14.500	13.266	252.560
4	Turkey	41.266	38.499	42.399	43.899	41.733	40.233	248.029
4	Adem Asil	13.300	13.400	14.666	15.033	14.100	13.133	248.029
4	Mehmet Ayberk Koşak	13.533	11.666	14.333				248.029
4	Mert Efe Kılıçer		13.433					248.029
4	Kerem Şener			13.400	14.466	13.733		248.029
4	Emre Dodanlı	14.433			14.400	13.900	13.800	248.029
5	Spain	41.665	40.332	40.532	43.066	41.365	40.765	247.725
5	Néstor Abad	13.966		13.866	14.400	12.766	13.566	247.725
5	Thierno Diallo		13.433			14.166		247.725
5	Joel Plata	14.066	13.633	13.200			13.933	247.725
5	Nicolau Mir	13.633		13.466	14.466	14.433	13.266	247.725
5	Daniel Carrion		13.266		14.200			247.725
6	Israel	42.133	41.066	39.832	42.232	41.499	39.866	246.628
6	Artem Dolgopyat	15.100		13.000	14.366	13.800	13.433	246.628
6	Pavel Gulidov			13.366	14.133			246.628
6	Ilia Liubimov	13.633	14.166		13.733	13.833	12.100	246.628
6	Alexander Myakinin		13.600				14.333	246.628
6	Uri Zeidel	13.400	13.300	13.466		13.866		246.628
7	Cyprus	42.132	39.632	40.366	40.466	41.732	42.066	246.394
7	Ilias Georgiou	13.900	12.566	13.333	14.500	13.566	14.366	246.394
7	Marios Georgiou	14.066	14.400	13.033	11.966	14.933	14.400	246.394
7	Sokratis Pilakouris			14.000				246.394
7	Michalis Chari	14.166	12.666					246.394
7	Georgios Angonas				14.000	13.233	13.300	246.394
8	Switzerland	39.999	39.532	40.866	42.865	42.432	39.665	245.359
8	Christian Baumann			13.800		14.066		245.359
8	Luca Giubellini	13.766	12.266		14.733			245.359
8	Matteo Giubellini	13.533	14.633	13.433	13.866		13.533	245.359
8	Noe Seifert		12.633	13.633		14.400	12.266	245.359
8	Taha Serhani	12.700			14.266	13.966	13.866	245.359

=== All-around ===
73 gymnasts took part in the individual all-around competition with no prior qualification round. The following is the top 10 of the all-around.

Position	Gymnast	Floor (gymnastics)	Pommel horse	Rings (gymnastics)	Vault (gymnastics)	Parallel bars	Horizontal bar	Total
1st place, gold medalist(s)	(Cyprus) Marios Georgiou	13.533	14.266	13.233	14.100	14.633	14.500	84.265
2nd place, silver medalist(s)	(Ukraine) Oleg Verniaiev	13.733	15.166	14.033	14.666	14.200	12.233	84.031
3rd place, bronze medalist(s)	(Italy) Yumin Abbadini	14.066	14.233	13.700	14.000	13.433	14.333	83.765
4	(United Kingdom) Jake Jarman	14.533	13.866	13.133	14.933	13.400	13.566	83.431
5	(Hungary) Krisztofer Mészáros	14.333	13.500	13.366	13.966	14.233	14.000	83.398
6	(Ukraine) Illia Kovtun	11.966	13.700	13.466	14.333	15.266	14.600	83.331
7	(Spain) Néstor Abad	13.733	13.366	13.800	14.300	14.166	13.433	82.798
8	(Israel) Artem Dolgopyat	15.200	12.600	13.033	14.433	13.566	13.600	82.432
9	(Turkey) Adem Asil	14.066	11.966	14.933	15.133	12.900	13.333	82.331
10	(Cyprus) Ilias Georgiou	13.600	12.500	13.500	14.433	14.200	13.833	82.066

=== Floor ===
Oldest and youngest competitors

	Name	Country	Date of birth	Age
Youngest	Unai Baigorri	Spain	9 March 2005	19 years, 1 month and 17 days
Oldest	Jim Zona	France	12 February 1992	32 years, 2 months and 14 days

Position	Gymnast	D Score	E Score	Penalty	Total
1st place, gold medalist(s)	(United Kingdom) Luke Whitehouse	6.5	8.366		14.866
2nd place, silver medalist(s)	(Israel) Artem Dolgopyat	6.4	8.533	0.100	14.833
3rd place, bronze medalist(s)	(Hungary) Krisztofer Mészáros	6.3	8.300		14.600
4	(Spain) Unai Baigorri	5.8	8.433		14.233
5	(France) Léo Saladino	5.9	8.166		14.066
6	(United Kingdom) Jake Jarman	6.3	8.066	0.400	13.966
7	(Spain) Nicolau Mir	5.5	8.266	0.100	13.666
8	(France) Jim Zona	5.1	7.833		12.933

=== Pommel horse ===
Oldest and youngest competitors

	Name	Country	Date of birth	Age
Youngest	Matteo Giubellini	Switzerland	4 November 2004	19 years, 5 months and 22 days
Oldest	Filip Ude	Croatia	3 June 1986	37 years, 10 months and 23 days

Position	Gymnast	D Score	E Score	Penalty	Total
1st place, gold medalist(s)	(Republic of Ireland) Rhys McClenaghan	6.5	8.800		15.300
2nd place, silver medalist(s)	(Netherlands) Loran de Munck	6.5	8.433		14.933
3rd place, bronze medalist(s)	(Cyprus) Marios Georgiou	6.2	8.600		14.800
4	(Switzerland) Matteo Giubellini	6.1	8.500		14.600
5	(Croatia) Filip Ude	5.8	8.733		14.533
6	(Georgia (country)) Levan Skhiladze	5.8	8.433		14.233
7	(Ukraine) Oleg Verniaiev	6.7	7.500		14.200
8	(Israel) Ilia Liubimov	5.8	7.333		13.133
9	(Armenia) Gagik Khachikyan	6.1	6.366		12.466

=== Rings ===
Oldest and youngest competitors

	Name	Country	Date of birth	Age
Youngest	Adem Asil	Turkey	21 February 1999	25 years, 2 months and 5 days
Oldest	Eleftherios Petrounias	Greece	30 November 1990	33 years, 4 months and 27 days

Position	Gymnast	D Score	E Score	Penalty	Total
1st place, gold medalist(s)	(Greece) Eleftherios Petrounias	6.3	8.700		15.000
2nd place, silver medalist(s)	(Azerbaijan) Nikita Simonov	6.2	8.700		14.900
3rd place, bronze medalist(s)	(Turkey) Adem Asil	6.3	8.600		14.900
4	(Armenia) Artur Avetisyan	6.1	8.700		14.800
4	(Austria) Vinzenz Höck	6.1	8.700		14.800
6	(United Kingdom) Courtney Tulloch	6.0	8.700		14.700
7	(Italy) Salvatore Maresca	6.2	8.366		14.566
8	(Turkey) İbrahim Çolak	5.9	8.600		14.500

=== Vault ===
Oldest and youngest competitors

	Name	Country	Date of birth	Age
Youngest	Luca Giubellini	Switzerland	1 April 2003	21 years and 26 days
Oldest	Artur Davtyan	Armenia	8 August 1992	31 years, 8 months and 19 days

Position	Gymnast	Vault 1				Vault 2				Total
Position	Gymnast	D Score	E Score	Pen.	Score 1	D Score	E Score	Pen.	Score 2	Total
1st place, gold medalist(s)	(United Kingdom) Jake Jarman	6.0	9.100	0.100	15.000	5.6	9.166		14.766	14.883
2nd place, silver medalist(s)	(Armenia) Artur Davtyan	5.6	9.500		15.100	5.6	9.100	0.100	14.600	14.850
3rd place, bronze medalist(s)	(Ukraine) Nazar Chepurnyi	5.6	9.133		14.733	5.6	9.166		14.766	14.749
4	(Ukraine) Igor Radivilov	5.6	9.200		14.800	5.6	7.900	0.300	13.200	14.000
5	(Republic of Ireland) Dominick Cunningham	5.2	8.933		14.133	4.8	9.000		13.800	13.966
6	(United Kingdom) Luke Whitehouse	5.6	7.766	0.300	13.066	5.2	9.100		14.300	13.683
7	(Netherlands) Casimir Schmidt	5.6	7.700	0.100	13.200	5.6	8.633	0.300	13.933	13.566
8	(Switzerland) Luca Giubellini	5.6	8.766		14.366	5.2	7.766	0.300	12.666	13.516

=== Parallel bars ===
Oldest and youngest competitors

	Name	Country	Date of birth	Age
Youngest	Illia Kovtun	Ukraine	10 August 2003	20 years, 8 months and 17 days
Oldest	James Hall	Great Britain	6 October 1995	28 years, 6 months and 21 days

Position	Gymnast	D Score	E Score	Penalty	Total
1st place, gold medalist(s)	(Ukraine) Illia Kovtun	6.9	8.733		15.633
2nd place, silver medalist(s)	(Cyprus) Marios Georgiou	6.1	8.766		14.866
3rd place, bronze medalist(s)	(Switzerland) Noè Seifert	6.3	8.533		14.833
4	(France) Cameron-Lie Bernard	6.3	8.200		14.500
5	(United Kingdom) James Hall	6.1	8.266		14.366
6	(Ukraine) Nazar Chepurnyi	6.3	7.566		13.866
7	(Italy) Mario Macchiati	5.7	7.600		13.300
8	(Spain) Thierno Diallo	5.9	7.000		12.900

=== Horizontal bar ===
Oldest and youngest competitors

	Name	Country	Date of birth	Age
Youngest	Illia Kovtun	Ukraine	10 August 2003	20 years, 8 months and 17 days
Oldest	Robert Tvorogal	Lithuania	5 October 1994	29 years, 6 months and 22 days

Position	Gymnast	D Score	E Score	Penalty	Total
1st place, gold medalist(s)	(Ukraine) Illia Kovtun	5.9	8.700		14.600
2nd place, silver medalist(s)	(Lithuania) Robert Tvorogal	5.8	8.766		14.566
3rd place, bronze medalist(s)	(Cyprus) Marios Georgiou	5.9	8.466		14.366
4	(Switzerland) Noè Seifert	6.0	8.266		14.266
5	(Israel) Alexander Myakinin	5.9	8.200		14.100
6	(Croatia) Tin Srbić	5.5	8.566		14.066
7	(Italy) Yumin Abbadini	6.1	7.733		13.833
8	(Spain) Joel Plata	5.9	7.466		13.366

== Junior results ==
=== Team ===
20 nations took part in the junior team competition. The following were the top 8 teams.

Rank	Team	Floor (gymnastics)	Pommel horse	Rings (gymnastics)	Vault (gymnastics)	Parallel bars	Horizontal bar	Total
1st place, gold medalist(s)	Great Britain	41.265	38.898	39.066	42.599	39.765	38.665	240.258
1st place, gold medalist(s)	Uzair Chowdhury			12.933		13.733	12.966	240.258
1st place, gold medalist(s)	Zakaine Fawzi-McCaffrey	13.533	13.066		13.933			240.258
1st place, gold medalist(s)	Gabriel Langton		12.566	13.200		13.066	12.633	240.258
1st place, gold medalist(s)	Evan McPhillips	13.866		12.933	14.166			240.258
1st place, gold medalist(s)	Sol Scott	13.866	13.266		14.500	12.966	13.066	240.258
2nd place, silver medalist(s)	Italy	41.500	39.333	39.233	42.199	38.799	39.166	240.230
2nd place, silver medalist(s)	Pietro Mazzola				13.866	13.000		240.230
2nd place, silver medalist(s)	Simone Speranza	13.400		12.933	14.000			240.230
2nd place, silver medalist(s)	Manuel Berettera	13.900	13.200			12.833	13.300	240.230
2nd place, silver medalist(s)	Tommaso Brugnami	14.200	13.033	13.300	14.333	12.966	12.733	240.230
2nd place, silver medalist(s)	Diego Vazzola		13.100	13.000			13.133	240.230
3rd place, bronze medalist(s)	France	40.533	38.333	38.532	42.566	39.832	39.000	238.796
3rd place, bronze medalist(s)	Elias Breche	13.300		12.800	13.966		12.600	238.796
3rd place, bronze medalist(s)	Karim Mangala-Bima		12.600	12.566	14.200			238.796
3rd place, bronze medalist(s)	Anthony Mansard	13.533	12.900	13.166	14.400	13.300	13.700	238.796
3rd place, bronze medalist(s)	Alan Moullec	13.700				13.166		238.796
3rd place, bronze medalist(s)	Nathan Camilleri		12.833			13.366	12.700	238.796
4	Austria	39.499	38.999	38.766	41.933	38.300	38.066	235.563
4	Jeremy Balazs					12.600	12.600	235.563
4	Mateo Fraisl		12.833		13.700			235.563
4	Vincent Lindpointner	12.833		13.133	14.200			235.563
4	Alfred Schwaiger	13.133	13.600	12.900		12.700	13.033	235.563
4	Gino Vetter	13.533	12.566	12.733	14.033	13.000	12.433	235.563
5	Switzerland	39.732	36.865	38.166	41.532	38.166	38.532	232.993
5	Janic Faessler			12.700	13.766	12.833	12.766	232.993
5	Timon Erb	13.166	12.566	12.800	14.066	12.733		232.993
5	Florian Keller	13.166	12.166			12.600		232.993
5	Nico Oberholzer			12.666			13.100	232.993
5	Carlo Riesco	13.400	12.133		13.700		12.666	232.993
6	Spain	39.198	37.433	38.633	41.166	37.666	37.966	232.062
6	Alvaro Giraldez	13.366	12.500	12.800	13.833	12.600	13.033	232.062
6	Sergio David Kovacs	13.366		13.300	14.000	12.600	13.033	232.062
6	Alejandro Cabrera		12.500					232.062
6	Gabriel Barris			12.533	13.333		11.900	232.062
6	Orian Diaz	12.466	12.433			12.466		232.062
7	Hungary	39.099	38.766	38.532	40.666	37.233	37.699	231.995
7	Dominik Kis	12.500	12.600	12.966			12.700	231.995
7	Daniel Tamas Bogyo	13.466	13.366	12.866	13.333	12.500		231.995
7	Nandor Sas	13.133	12.800		13.833			231.995
7	Bence Hamza-Vargity			12.700	13.500	12.633	12.666	231.995
7	Zeteny Kiss					12.100	12.333	231.995
8	Netherlands	38.433	37.366	38.432	41.832	37.965	37.800	231.828
8	Aaron Enser	13.100	12.233	12.533	14.066	12.566		231.828
8	Cas Keser		12.300	12.933		12.933	12.700	231.828
8	Jayden Paton							231.828
8	Leon Atherton	13.100	12.833		13.666	12.466	12.600	231.828
8	Elijah Faverus	12.233		12.966	14.100		12.500	231.828

=== All-around ===
Position	Gymnast	Floor (gymnastics)	Pommel horse	Rings (gymnastics)	Vault (gymnastics)	Parallel bars	Horizontal bar	Total
1st place, gold medalist(s)	Anthony Mansard (FRA)	13.733	13.000	13.133	14.400	13.633	13.600	81.499
2nd place, silver medalist(s)	Tommaso Brugnami (ITA)	13.900	12.866	13.200	14.600	13.166	13.100	80.832
3rd place, bronze medalist(s)	Gabriel Langton (GBR)	13.233	12.966	13.166	13.866	13.500	12.833	79.564
4	Jonas Eder (GER)	12.966	13.466	12.500	13.833	13.600	13.033	79.398
5	Alfred Schwaiger (AUT)	13.033	13.900	12.833	13.133	13.066	12.966	78.931
6	David Ivanov (BUL)	12.900	14.133	13.000	13.000	13.700	12.100	78.833
7	Alperen Ege Avcı (TUR)	13.333	12.400	12.766	13.866	12.600	13.100	78.065
8	Alvaro Giraldez (ESP)	13.133	12.433	12.033	13.800	13.066	13.166	77.631
9	Manuel Berettera (ITA)	13.266	11.766	12.866	13.833	12.666	13.233	77.630
10	Elias Breche (FRA)	12.933	12.666	12.700	14.000	12.866	12.333	77.498
11	Sol Scott (GBR)	13.766	13.266	12.266	13.100	12.033	12.866	77.297
12	Sergio David Kovacs (ESP)	13.300	12.366	13.033	14.100	11.333	13.133	77.265
13	Elijah Faverus (NED)	12.733	11.833	12.966	14.133	12.966	12.600	77.231
14	Gino Vetter (AUT)	13.000	12.500	12.733	13.966	12.966	11.633	76.798
14	Daniel Tamas Bogyo (HUN)	13.500	13.300	12.866	13.300	12.166	11.666	76.798
16	Timon Erb (SUI)	13.133	12.533	12.666	14.066	12.933	11.233	76.564
17	Ivan Rudyi (UKR)	12.700	13.033	12.900	13.200	12.633	11.400	75.866
18	Janic Faessler (SUI)	13.100	11.033	12.866	12.866	12.933	12.566	75.364
19	Kyano Schepers (BEL)	11.700	13.400	12.200	12.900	12.166	12.800	75.166
20	Dominik Kis (HUN)	12.600	12.600	12.700	13.233	13.033	10.966	75.132
21	Jonas Danek (CZE)	12.866	11.700	12.300	13.600	12.400	12.100	74.966
22	Mert Öztürk (GER)	12.766	12.533	12.900	12.933	11.033	12.733	74.898
23	Aaron Enser (NED)	12.766	10.900	11.566	13.966	12.733	12.800	74.731
24	Robert Gyulumyan (ARM)	13.233	12.133	12.433	13.100	12.633	11.100	74.632

=== Floor ===
Position	Gymnast	D Score	E Score	Penalty	Total
1st place, gold medalist(s)	(Italy) Tommaso Brugnami	5.2	8.666		13.866
2nd place, silver medalist(s)	(France) Anthony Mansard	5.1	8.400		13.500
3rd place, bronze medalist(s)	(France) Alan Moullec	5.0	8.333		13.333
4	(United Kingdom) Sol Scott	5.1	8.300	-0.10	13.300
5	(Italy) Manuel Berettera	5.0	8.166		13.166
6	(Turkey) Alperen Ege Avcı	4.6	8.466		13.066
7	(Austria) Gino Vetter	4.8	7.566		12.366
8	(United Kingdom) Evan McPhillips	5.1	7.000	-0.10	12.000

=== Pommel horse ===
Position	Gymnast	D Score	E Score	Penalty	Total
1st place, gold medalist(s)	(Armenia) Hamlet Manukyan	5.6	8.900		14.500
2nd place, silver medalist(s)	(Bulgaria) David Ivanov	5.7	8.600		14.300
3rd place, bronze medalist(s)	(Armenia) Mamikon Khachatryan	5.5	8.766		14.266
4	(Georgia (country)) Dachi Dolidze	5.6	8.433		14.033
5	(Austria) Alfred Schwaiger	5.3	8.400		13.700
6	(Republic of Ireland) James Hickey	5.1	8.366		13.466
7	(Lithuania) Kristijonas Padegimas	4.6	8.433		13.033
8	(Hungary) Daniel Tamas Bogyo	4.4	8.433		12.833

=== Rings ===
Position	Gymnast	D Score	E Score	Penalty	Total
1st place, gold medalist(s)	(Italy) Tommaso Brugnami	4.3	8.966		13.266
2nd place, silver medalist(s)	(United Kingdom) Gabriel Langton	4.2	9.033		13.233
3rd place, bronze medalist(s)	(Austria) Vincent Lindpointner	4.4	8.800		13.200
4	(France) Anthony Mansard	4.4	8.733		13.133
5	(Spain) Sergio David Kovacs	4.6	8.433		13.033
6	(Bulgaria) David Ivanov	4.5	8.400		12.900
6	(Ukraine) Sviatoslav Shved	4.2	8.700		12.900
8	(Germany) Mert Öztürk	4.2	8.600		12.800

=== Vault ===
Position	Gymnast	Vault 1				Vault 2				Total
Position	Gymnast	D Score	E Score	Pen.	Score 1	D Score	E Score	Pen.	Score 2	Total
1st place, gold medalist(s)	(United Kingdom) Sol Scott	5.2	9.266		14.466	5.2	9.266		14.466	14.466
2nd place, silver medalist(s)	(Italy) Tommaso Brugnami	5.2	9.300		14.500	4.8	9.100		13.900	14.200
3rd place, bronze medalist(s)	(Spain) Sergio David Kovacs	4.8	9.233		14.033	4.8	9.200		14.000	14.016
4	(Czech Republic) Jonas Danek	4.8	9.133		13.833	4.8	8.900		13.700	13.766
5	(France) Anthony Mansard	5.2	9.066		14.266	4.0	9.133		13.133	13.699
6	(France) Karim Mangala-Bima	5.2	8.600		13.800	4.0	9.366		13.366	13.583
7	(Germany) Elias Jaffer	5.2	8.766		13.866	4.0	9.266		13.266	13.566
8	(Romania) David Puicea	4.8	8.966		13.766	5.2	7.900	-0.30	12.800	13.283

=== Parallel bars ===
Position	Gymnast	D Score	E Score	Penalty	Total
1st place, gold medalist(s)	(United Kingdom) Uzair Chowdhury	5.0	9.066		14.066
2nd place, silver medalist(s)	(Germany) Jonas Eder	5.0	8.700		13.700
2nd place, silver medalist(s)	(France) Anthony Mansard	5.1	8.600		13.700
2nd place, silver medalist(s)	(Ukraine) Sviatoslav Shved	5.0	8.700		13.700
5	(United Kingdom) Gabriel Langton	4.7	8.800		13.500
6	(France) Nathan Camilleri	4.7	8.333		13.033
7	(Bulgaria) David Ivanov	5.2	7.466		12.666
8	(Ukraine) Ivan Rudyi	4.9	7.666		12.566

=== Horizontal bar ===
Position	Gymnast	D Score	E Score	Penalty	Total
1st place, gold medalist(s)	(France) Anthony Mansard	4.8	8.633		13.433
2nd place, silver medalist(s)	(Belgium) Kyano Schepers	4.6	8.733		13.333
3rd place, bronze medalist(s)	(Italy) Manuel Berettera	4.6	8.700		13.300
4	(Ukraine) Ivan Rudyi	5.0	8.266		13.266
5	(Switzerland) Nico Oberholzer	4.7	8.333		13.033
6	(Austria) Alfred Schwaiger	4.4	8.600		13.000
7	(Italy) Diego Vazzola	4.5	8.133		12.633
8	(Spain) Alvaro Giraldez	4.1	7.900		11.833
9	(United Kingdom) Sol Scott	4.3	7.533		11.833
