= Manuel Berettera =

Italian artistic gymnast (born 2006)

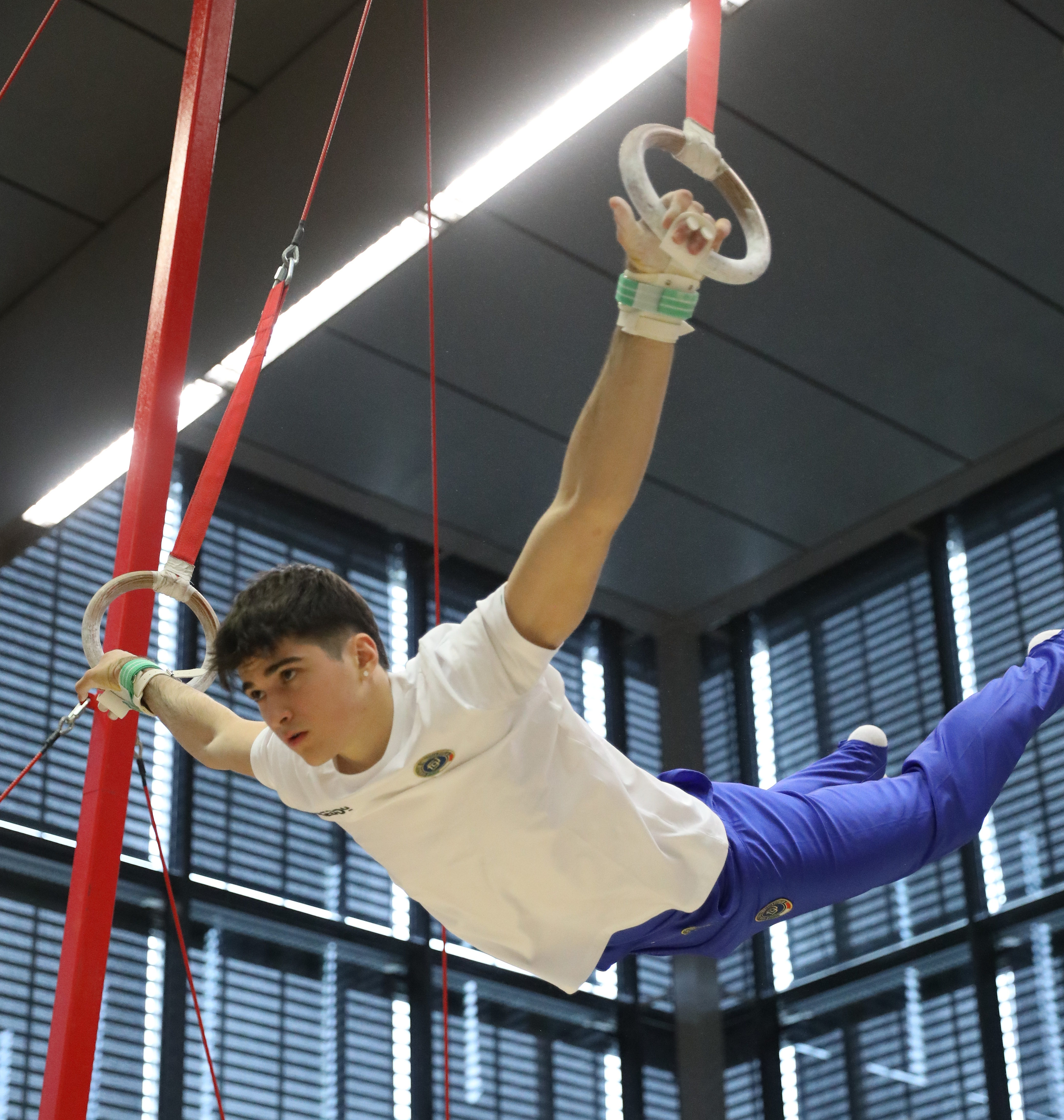
- Berettera at Luxembourg Open 2023

Personal information
- Born: 15 September 2006 (age 19) Brescia, Italy

Gymnastics career
- Discipline: Men's artistic gymnastics
- Country represented: Italy
- Club: Artistica Brescia
- Head coach: Pietro Matias Bani
Medal record
Men's artistic gymnastics
Representing Italy
Junior World Championships
Bronze medal – third place	2023 Antalya	Team

Manuel Berettera (born 15 September 2006) is an Italian artistic gymnast. He was a member of the Italian team at the 2023 Junior World Artistic Gymnastics Championships and won a bronze medal. At the 2024 European Men's Artistic Gymnastics Championships, Berettera was the junior horizontal bar bronze and team silver medalist.
