= Jake Jarman =

British artistic gymnast (born 2001)

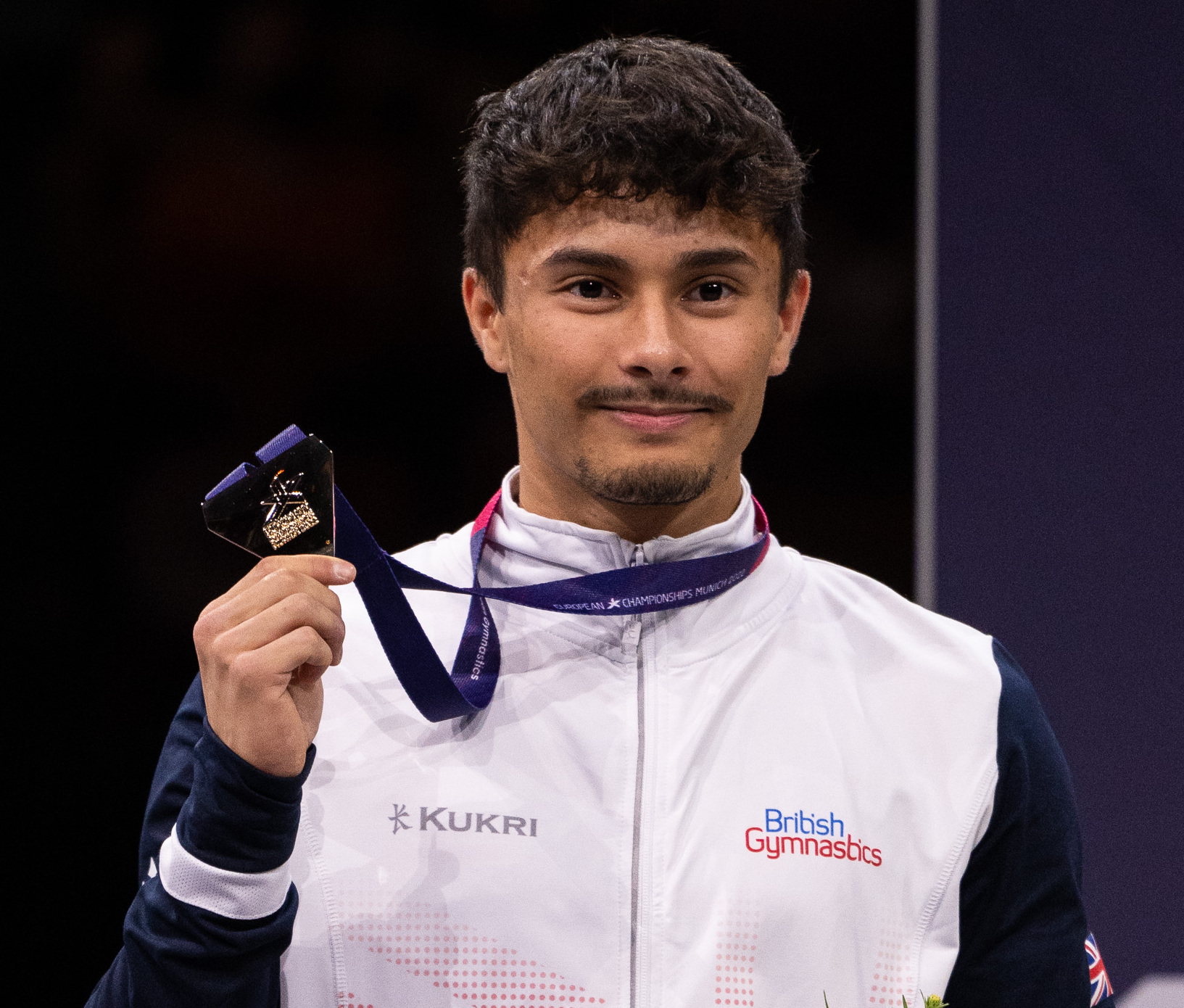
- Jarman at the 2022 European Championships

Personal information
- Full name: Jake Elmer Jarman
- Born: 3 December 2001 (age 24) Peterborough, England
- Height: 5 ft 2 in (157 cm)

Gymnastics career
- Discipline: Men's artistic gymnastics
- Country represented: (United Kingdom) Great Britain; England; (2018–present)
- Club: Huntingdon Gymnastics Club
- Head coach: Ben Howells
- Eponymous skills: Jarman (floor exercise)
Medal record
Men's artistic gymnastics
Representing Great Britain
Olympic Games
Bronze medal – third place	2024 Paris	Floor Exercise
World Championships
Gold medal – first place	2023 Antwerp	Vault
Gold medal – first place	2025 Jakarta	Floor Exercise
Silver medal – second place	2026 Rotterdam	Floor Exercise
Silver medal – second place	2026 Rotterdam	Vault
Bronze medal – third place	2022 Liverpool	Team
European Championships
Gold medal – first place	2022 Munich	Team
Gold medal – first place	2022 Munich	Vault
Gold medal – first place	2024 Rimini	Vault
Gold medal – first place	2025 Leipzig	Team
Silver medal – second place	2023 Antalya	All-Around
Silver medal – second place	2023 Antalya	Vault
Silver medal – second place	2024 Rimini	Team
Silver medal – second place	2025 Leipzig	Mixed Team
Silver medal – second place	2025 Leipzig	Vault
Bronze medal – third place	2022 Munich	Floor Exercise
Bronze medal – third place	2023 Antalya	Team
Representing England
Commonwealth Games
Gold medal – first place	2022 Birmingham	Team
Gold medal – first place	2022 Birmingham	All-Around
Gold medal – first place	2022 Birmingham	Floor Exercise
Gold medal – first place	2022 Birmingham	Vault

Jake Elmer Jarman (born 3 December 2001) is a British artistic gymnast and competes internationally for Great Britain and England. Representing Great Britain, he is the 2023 World Champion on vault, the 2025 World Champion on floor, the 2024 Olympic floor exercise bronze medalist, and is a four-time European Champion. Representing England, he is a four-time Commonwealth Games champion and is the first English male gymnast to win four gold medals at a single Games (2022). He trains at Huntington Gymnastics Club.

== Early life ==
Jarman was born on 3 December 2001 in Peterborough, England, to a British father and a Filipino mother from Cebu. In an interview with the Philippine Star, Jarman revealed that he lived in the Philippines for two years between the ages of three and five and still communicates with his Filipino relatives.

== Gymnastics career ==
=== 2018 ===
In 2018, Jarman competed in the junior division of the European Championships, where he helped the British team take the silver medal behind Russia, and also picked up an individual silver on vault.

=== 2021 ===
In 2021, at the age of 19, Jarman finished tenth in the all-around at the European Championships, and was selected as a reserve for the 2020 Olympics in Tokyo, Japan.

=== 2022 ===
The following year was Jarman's breakthrough year, taking the British senior titles in floor and vault. Selected to represent England at the 2022 Commonwealth Games in Birmingham, Jarman won gold in four events; the team competition, the individual all-around, with England teammate James Hall in second place, the floor final with teammate Giarnni Regini-Moran in bronze, and the vault final with Regini-Moran in silver.

Jarman then competed for Great Britain at the 2022 European Championships, where he helped Great Britain win the team final for the first time in a decade, and only the second time ever. Additionally, he finished 8th in the individual all-around and qualified for the floor final, but initially missed the vault final on the two-per-nation rule despite qualifying in fifth. On individual finals day Jarman won bronze on floor before the withdrawal of teammate Giarnni Regini-Moran from the vault final to concentrate on parallel bars allowed Jarman to take part in that final. Taking advantage, Jarman won gold in the vault final, edging out Armenian rival Artur Davtyan on a tie-break.

=== 2023 ===
During the 2023 World Challenge Cup Series, Jarman became the first gymnast to perform a 3.5 twisting double layout salto on floor exercise, getting the skill named after him in the Code of Points. He then was part of the British team that represented Great Britain at the 2023 World Championships, where the British team placed fourth, and individually, Jarman made the all-around final and won the gold medal in the vault final. In doing so he became the first Briton to win world gold on the apparatus, the fourth male British World Champion (after Max Whitlock, Joe Fraser, and Giarnni Regini-Moran), and sixth British World Champion in artistic gymnastics (after Whitlock, Fraser, Regini-Moran, Beth Tweddle, and Jessica Gadirova).

=== 2024 ===
At the 2024 European Championships, Jarman helped Great Britain finish second as a team behind Ukraine. Individually, he won his second gold medal on vault. In June of that year Jarman was selected to represent Great Britain at the 2024 Summer Olympics alongside Joe Fraser, Harry Hepworth, Luke Whitehouse, and Max Whitlock. Paris was Jarman's Olympic debut and with his teammates, finished fourth at the team all-around. He qualified for the finals of the floor exercise with the highest score of 14.966 and ultimately won bronze medal with a score of 14.933, his career-first Olympic medal and Team GB's first Paris medal in artistic gymnastics. Jarman finished his 2024 Olympics stint with a fourth place in vault.

During the Paris Olympics, it was reported in Philippine news media that the Gymnastics Association of the Philippines (GAP) is recruiting Jarman to potentially represent the country at the 2028 Summer Olympics in Los Angeles, with GAP president Cynthia Carrion stating that "[Jarman] wants to play for the Philippines".

=== 2025 ===
Jarman was selected to attend the 2025 European Championships alongside Harry Hepworth, Jamie Lewis, Jonas Rushworth and Luke Whitehouse where he contributed on floor exercise, vault, pommel horse, parallel bar and high bar to help Britain win their third ever European team title. He also qualified for the vault and mixed team final. He won silver with Ruby Evans in the inaugural mixed team final and won silver on vault. In late September, Jarman was selected to represent Great Britain at the 2025 World Championships where he won gold on floor exercise.

=== 2026 ===
Jarman was selected to represent Great Britain at the 2026 World Championships alongside Joe Fraser, Courtney Tulloch, Reuben Ward, Harry Hepworth, and alternate Jonas Rushworth. The British team placed 4th for team. He then won silvers for floor exercise and vault.

== Eponymous skill ==
Apparatus	Name	Description	Difficulty (Note: Valid for the 2022–2024 Code of Points)	Added to the Code of Points
Floor exercise	Jarman	Double salto straight backward with 3½ turn	I (0.9)	2023 Paris World Challenge Cup

== Competitive history ==
Competitive history of Jake Jarman
Year	Event	Team	AA	FX	PH	SR	VT	PB	HB
2015	Welsh Championships		3rd place, bronze medalist(s)						
2015	English Championships		7						
2018	RD761 Junior International Cup	2nd place, silver medalist(s)	5	4			2nd place, silver medalist(s)		
2018	English Championships		3rd place, bronze medalist(s)						
2018	British Championships		2nd place, silver medalist(s)				1st place, gold medalist(s)	4	7
2018	Youth Olympic Games Qualifier		14						
2018	Junior European Championships	2nd place, silver medalist(s)					2nd place, silver medalist(s)	8	
2019	English Championships (18 & under)		1st place, gold medalist(s)						
2019	British Championships (18 & under)		1st place, gold medalist(s)	2nd place, silver medalist(s)	4		1st place, gold medalist(s)		
2019	Doha World Cup			18			14		
2019	European Games		R2						
2019	Cardiff Friendly	2nd place, silver medalist(s)	12						
2019	Paris Challenge Cup						2nd place, silver medalist(s)		
2021
2021	European Championships		10						
2021	Koper Challenge Cup			R1					
2022	English Championships		6						
2022	British Championships		3rd place, bronze medalist(s)	1st place, gold medalist(s)	2nd place, silver medalist(s)		1st place, gold medalist(s)	6	6
2022	Baku World Cup						7		
2022	Commonwealth Games	1st place, gold medalist(s)	1st place, gold medalist(s)	1st place, gold medalist(s)			1st place, gold medalist(s)		
2022	European Championships	1st place, gold medalist(s)	8	3rd place, bronze medalist(s)			1st place, gold medalist(s)		
2022	World Championships	3rd place, bronze medalist(s)	5						
2023	British Championships		2nd place, silver medalist(s)	2nd place, silver medalist(s)			1st place, gold medalist(s)	1st place, gold medalist(s)	2nd place, silver medalist(s)
2023	European Championships	3rd place, bronze medalist(s)	2nd place, silver medalist(s)				2nd place, silver medalist(s)	9	
2023	Paris Challenge Cup			4					
2023	World Championships	4	13				1st place, gold medalist(s)		
2024	English Championships		3rd place, bronze medalist(s)	3rd place, bronze medalist(s)	3rd place, bronze medalist(s)	11	1st place, gold medalist(s)	14	2nd place, silver medalist(s)
2024	British Championships		2nd place, silver medalist(s)	1st place, gold medalist(s)	2nd place, silver medalist(s)		1st place, gold medalist(s)		1st place, gold medalist(s)
2024	European Championships	2nd place, silver medalist(s)	4	6			1st place, gold medalist(s)		
2024	Olympic Games	4	7	3rd place, bronze medalist(s)			4		
2025	British Championships				2nd place, silver medalist(s)		1st place, gold medalist(s)	1st place, gold medalist(s)	
2025	Osijek World Cup						7		
2025	European Championships	1st place, gold medalist(s)					3rd place, bronze medalist(s)		
2025	European Championships Mixed Team	2nd place, silver medalist(s)	—N/a						
2025	World Championships	—N/a		1st place, gold medalist(s)			R3		
2026	British Championships		3rd place, bronze medalist(s)	1st place, gold medalist(s)	3rd place, bronze medalist(s)		2nd place, silver medalist(s)		2nd place, silver medalist(s)
2026	World Championships	4	6	2nd place, silver medalist(s)			2nd place, silver medalist(s)		
