= 2016 European Artistic Gymnastics Championships =

2016 European Artistic Gymnastics Championships may refer to:

- 2016 European Women's Artistic Gymnastics Championships
- 2016 European Men's Artistic Gymnastics Championships
