= Harry Hepworth =

British artistic gymnast (born 2003)

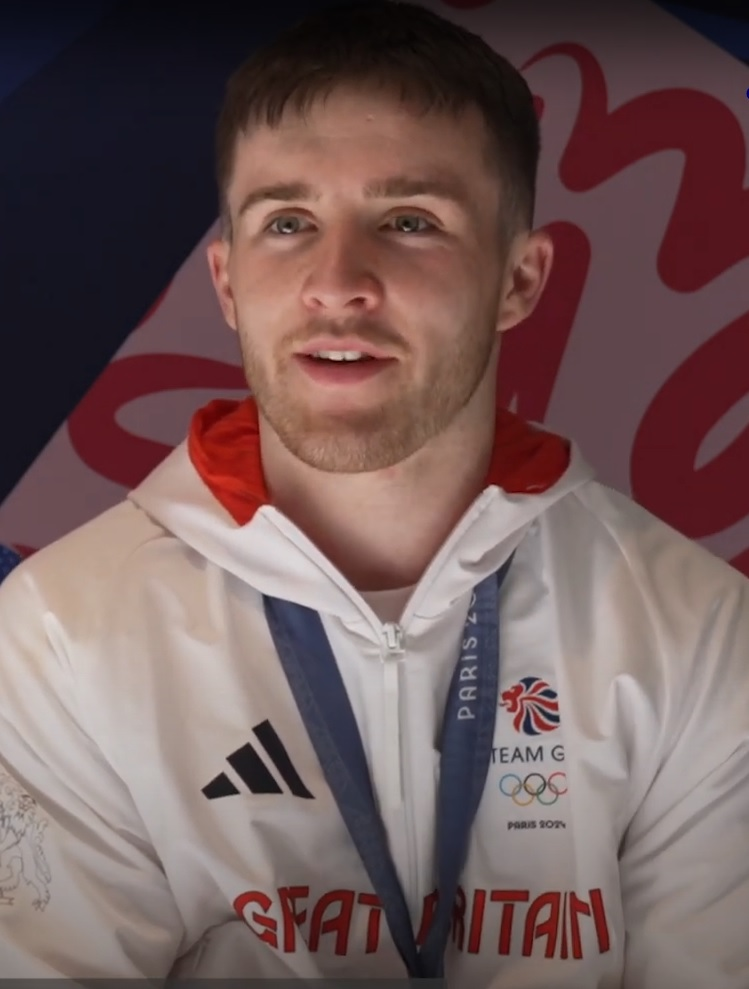
- Hepworth in 2024

Personal information
- Full name: Harry James Hepworth
- Born: 6 December 2003 (age 22) United Kingdom

Gymnastics career
- Discipline: Men's artistic gymnastics
- Country represented: (United Kingdom) Great Britain; (2022–present)
- Training location: Leeds, West Yorkshire
- Club: Leeds Gymnastics Club
- Head coaches: Andy Butcher; David Murray; Tom Rawlinson
Medal record
Men's artistic gymnastics
Representing Great Britain
Olympic Games
Bronze medal – third place	2024 Paris	Vault
European Championships
Gold medal – first place	2025 Leipzig	Team
Gold medal – first place	2026 Zagreb	Team
Silver medal – second place	2024 Rimini	Team
Silver medal – second place	2025 Leipzig	Floor exercise
Bronze medal – third place	2026 Zagreb	Floor exercise
FIG World Cup
Event	1st	2nd	3rd
Apparatus World Cup	2	4	1
World Challenge Cup	2	1	0
Total	4	5	1

Harry James Hepworth (born 6 December 2003) is a British artistic gymnast. He is the 2024 men's Olympic vault bronze medalist. He won gold as a member of the Great Britain team at the 2025 and 2026 European Championships and silver with the team at the 2023 European Championships. He also participated at the 2023 World Championships where the team placed fourth.

== Early life and education ==
At the age of five, Hepworth was diagnosed with Legg–Calvé–Perthes disease which sidelined him from sporting activity for three years. He then took up artistic gymnastics shortly after this.

He attended Prince Henry's Grammar School, Otley.

== Gymnastics career ==
=== 2023 ===
Hepworth was selected to attend the 2023 Baku World Cup, where he won silver on vault and placed 8th in the floor final. He then won gold on vault at the 2023 DTB Pokal Team Challenge. Hepworth attended the 2023 European Championships as an individual, where he placed 4th on floor and 7th on vault. He won gold on vault at the 2023 Paris Challenge Cup. Hepworth was named in the British team for the 2023 World Championships alongside Max Whitlock, Jake Jarman, Courtney Tulloch and James Hall. The team placed 4th and Hepworth made the floor, vault, and still ring finals, placing 6th, 7th, and 8th respectively.

=== 2024 ===
At the 2024 European Championships, Hepworth helped Great Britain finish second as a team behind Ukraine. In June of that year, he was selected to represent Great Britain at the 2024 Summer Olympics alongside Jake Jarman, Joe Fraser, Luke Whitehouse, and Max Whitlock. Hepworth won bronze in the vault at the Games in Paris, becoming the first British man to claim an Olympic medal in the discipline.

=== 2025 ===
At the Osijek World Cup, Hepworth won silver on vault and also made the steel ring and floor finals. He was selected to attend the 2025 European Championships alongside Jake Jarman, Jamie Lewis, Jonas Rushworth and Luke Whitehouse where he contributed on floor exercise, still rings and vault to help Britain win their third ever European team title. He also qualified for the floor exercise, still rings and vault finals, winning silver on floor behind teammate Luke Whitehouse and placing fifth on still rings and fourth on vault.

In late September, Hepworth was selected to represent Great Britain at the 2025 World Championships.

=== 2026 ===
Hepworth competed at the 2026 European Championships alongside Courtney Tulloch, Joe Fraser, Sol Scott, and Jonas Rushworth. During event finals, he won bronze on floor exercise and placed eighth and sixth on rings and vault respectively. On the final day of the competition, Hepworth helped Great Britain defend their European team title.

Hepworth was selected to represent Great Britain at the 2026 World Championships alongside Fraser, Tulloch, Reuben Ward, Jake Jarman, and alternate Rushworth.

== Competitive history ==
Competitive history of Harry Hepworth
Year	Event	Team	AA	FX	PH	SR	VT	PB	HB
2022	British Championships					3rd place, bronze medalist(s)	2nd place, silver medalist(s)		
2022	Koper Challenge Cup			1st place, gold medalist(s)			2nd place, silver medalist(s)		
2023	British Championships			3rd place, bronze medalist(s)		2nd place, silver medalist(s)			
2023	Baku World Cup			8			2nd place, silver medalist(s)		
2023	DTB Pokal Team Challenge						1st place, gold medalist(s)		
2023	European Championships			4			7		
2023	Paris Challenge Cup					5	1st place, gold medalist(s)		
2023	World Championships	4		6		8	7		
2024	British Championships					1st place, gold medalist(s)			
2024	Cottbus World Cup			1st place, gold medalist(s)		7	4		
2024	Baku World Cup					6	3rd place, bronze medalist(s)		
2024	European Championships	2nd place, silver medalist(s)							
2024	Olympic Games	4				7	3rd place, bronze medalist(s)		
2025	British Championships					2nd place, silver medalist(s)	2nd place, silver medalist(s)		
2025	Osijek World Cup			7		4	2nd place, silver medalist(s)		
2025	European Championships	1st place, gold medalist(s)		2nd place, silver medalist(s)		5	4		
2025	World Championships	—N/a				8			
2026	English Championships			7		1st place, gold medalist(s)			
2026	British Championships			2nd place, silver medalist(s)		1st place, gold medalist(s)	3rd place, bronze medalist(s)		
2026	Osijek World Cup			2nd place, silver medalist(s)		2nd place, silver medalist(s)	1st place, gold medalist(s)		
2026	European Championships	1st place, gold medalist(s)		3rd place, bronze medalist(s)		8	6		
2026	World Championships	4					6		
