= 2013 World Artistic Gymnastics Championships =

Gymnastics competition

2013 World Artistic Gymnastics Championships

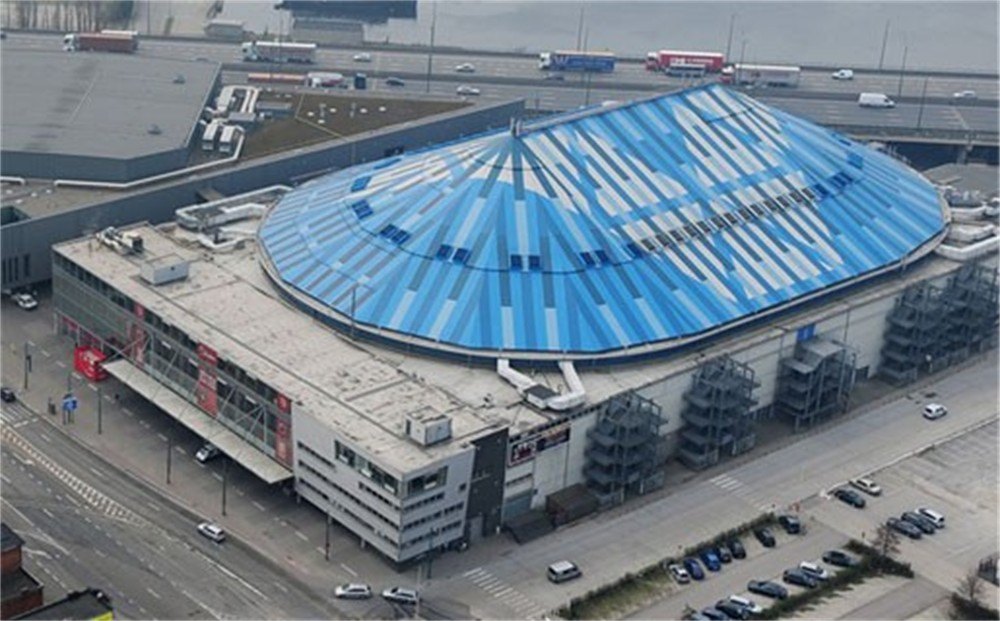
- Antwerp's Sports Palace, where the competition took place
- Venue: Antwerp's Sports Palace
- Location: Antwerp, Belgium
- Start date: 30 September
- End date: 6 October 2013

The 2013 World Artistic Gymnastics Championships were held in Antwerp, Belgium, from 30 September to 6 October 2013 at Antwerp's Sports Palace. Kōhei Uchimura won the men's individual all-around gold medal, and finished the competition with four total medals. Simone Biles won the women's individual all-around title, and also finished the competition with four medals.

== Competition schedule ==
All times are CEST (UTC+2).

Date	Time	Round
30 September 2013	10:00	Men's qualifying (Day 1)
1 October 2013	10:00	Men's qualifying (Day 2)
1 October 2013	14:00	Women's qualifying (Day 1)
2 October 2013	13:30	Women's qualifying (Day 2)
3 October 2013	20:00	Men's all-around final
4 October 2013	20:00	Women's all-around final

Date	Time	Round
5 October 2013	14:30	Men's floor final
5 October 2013	14:55	Women's vault final
5 October 2013	15:45	Men's pommel horse final
5 October 2013	16:10	Women's uneven bars final
5 October 2013	16:35	Men's rings final
6 October 2013	14:30	Men's vault final
6 October 2013	14:55	Women's balance beam final
6 October 2013	15:45	Men's parallel bars final
6 October 2013	16:10	Women's floor final
6 October 2013	16:40	Men's horizontal bar final

== Medalists ==
Event	Gold	Silver	Bronze
Men
Individual all-around	Kōhei Uchimura (JPN)	Ryohei Kato (JPN)	Fabian Hambüchen (GER)
Floor	Kenzo Shirai (JPN)	Jacob Dalton (USA)	Kōhei Uchimura (JPN)
Pommel horse	Kohei Kameyama (JPN)	Max Whitlock (GBR) Daniel Corral (MEX)	none awarded
Rings	Arthur Zanetti (BRA)	Aleksandr Balandin (RUS)	Brandon Wynn (USA)
Vault	Yang Hak-Seon (KOR)	Steven Legendre (USA)	Kristian Thomas (GBR)
Parallel bars	Kōhei Uchimura (JPN) Lin Chaopan (CHN)	none awarded	John Orozco (USA)
Horizontal bar	Epke Zonderland (NED)	Fabian Hambüchen (GER)	Kōhei Uchimura (JPN)
Women
Individual all-around	Simone Biles (USA)	Kyla Ross (USA)	Aliya Mustafina (RUS)
Vault	McKayla Maroney (USA)	Simone Biles (USA)	Hong Un-Jong (PRK)
Uneven bars	Huang Huidan (CHN)	Kyla Ross (USA)	Aliya Mustafina (RUS)
Balance beam	Aliya Mustafina (RUS)	Kyla Ross (USA)	Simone Biles (USA)
Floor	Simone Biles (USA)	Vanessa Ferrari (ITA)	Larisa Iordache (ROU)

== Men's results ==
=== Individual all-around ===
The final was held on 3 October. Kōhei Uchimura won his fourth consecutive individual all-around world championship crown, outscoring silver medalist Ryohei Kato by 1.958 points. Uchimura became the first male gymnast to win four world individual all-around titles. He posted the highest score on three of the six apparatuses.

Rank	Gymnast	Floor (gymnastics)	Pommel horse	Rings (gymnastics)	Vault (gymnastics)	Parallel bars	Horizontal bar	Total
1st place, gold medalist(s)	Kōhei Uchimura (JPN)	15.558	15.133	15.100	15.333	15.333	15.533	91.990
2nd place, silver medalist(s)	Ryohei Kato (JPN)	15.500	14.600	14.666	14.800	15.300	15.166	90.032
3rd place, bronze medalist(s)	Fabian Hambüchen (GER)	15.133	13.333	14.800	14.900	15.233	15.933	89.332
4	Max Whitlock (GBR)	15.266	15.633	14.266	14.733	14.533	14.600	89.031
5	Sérgio Sasaki (BRA)	15.133	14.250	14.600	15.200	14.900	14.866	88.949
6	Sam Mikulak (USA)	15.366	14.608	14.775	14.833	15.200	13.766	88.548
7	Daniel Purvis (GBR)	15.133	14.333	14.341	15.033	15.000	14.266	88.106
8	Andrey Likhovitskiy (BLR)	14.266	15.000	14.166	14.133	15.058	14.800	87.423
9	Lin Chaopan (CHN)	14.466	14.766	14.433	14.133	15.100	13.966	86.864
10	Zhou Shixiong (CHN)	14.833	13.066	14.066	14.700	15.400	14.566	86.631
11	Fabián González (ESP)	14.800	14.500	13.966	14.900	13.200	15.000	86.366
12	David Belyavskiy (RUS)	14.633	13.933	14.533	14.900	14.675	13.600	86.274
13	Arnaud Willig (FRA)	14.300	14.125	14.466	14.066	14.700	14.333	85.990
14	Bart Deurloo (NED)	14.800	13.700	13.366	14.233	14.166	15.466	85.731
15	Oleg Verniaiev (UKR)	15.133	13.800	14.733	15.166	15.000	11.833	85.665
16	Pablo Braegger (SUI)	14.183	13.916	14.133	13.833	14.566	14.633	85.264
17	Arthur Oyakawa (BRA)	15.033	11.633	14.166	14.900	14.508	14.900	85.140
18	Casimir Schmidt (NED)	15.000	12.700	14.108	14.733	14.066	13.600	84.207
19	Gustavo Palma Simões (POR)	14.300	13.766	14.800	13.766	13.166	13.700	83.298
20	Néstor Abad (ESP)	14.466	12.825	13.566	14.400	13.400	14.433	83.090
21	Ángel Ramos (PUR)	14.600	10.466	13.466	14.500	13.566	14.366	80.964
22	Park Min-Soo (KOR)	13.866	11.700	14.300	13.066	13.400	14.566	80.898
23	Oliver Hegi (SUI)	13.933	13.766	13.700	14.666	15.000	7.100	78.165
24	Jossimar Calvo (COL)	–	14.575	14.433	13.866	15.400	11.233	69.507

=== Floor ===
The final was held on 5 October. Japan's Kenzo Shirai became the first gymnast to successfully perform a backward quadruple-twisting layout somersault (the Shirai or Shirai-Nguyen on floor), and a forward triple-twisting layout somersault (the Shirai 2 on floor) in the final of a major, where he won gold. At 17 years, 1 month and 11 days, Shirai also became the youngest male gymnast at the championships to take a gold medal, and the youngest ever male world champion on floor exercise.

Position	Gymnast	D Score	E Score	Penalty	Total
1st place, gold medalist(s)	Kenzo Shirai (JPN)	7.400	8.600		16.000
2nd place, silver medalist(s)	Jacob Dalton (USA)	6.700	8.900		15.600
3rd place, bronze medalist(s)	Kōhei Uchimura (JPN)	6.400	9.100		15.500
4	Daniel Purvis (GBR)	6.500	8.900		15.400
5	Diego Hypólito (BRA)	6.900	8.466		15.366
5	Steven Legendre (USA)	6.800	8.566		15.366
7	Fabian Hambüchen (GER)	6.500	8.800		15.300
8	Scott Morgan (CAN)	6.400	8.433		14.833

=== Pommel horse ===
The final was held on 5 October. Kohei Kameyama of Japan won the gold medal.

Position	Gymnast	D Score	E Score	Penalty	Total
1st place, gold medalist(s)	Kohei Kameyama (JPN)	6.900	8.933		15.833
2nd place, silver medalist(s)	Max Whitlock (GBR)	7.200	8.433		15.633
2nd place, silver medalist(s)	Daniel Corral (MEX)	6.800	8.833		15.633
4	Zhang Hongtao (CHN)	6.600	9.000		15.600
4	Alberto Busnari (ITA)	7.100	8.500		15.600
6	Robert Seligman (CRO)	6.400	9.033		15.433
7	Matvei Petrov (RUS)	6.700	8.716		15.416
8	Prashanth Sellathurai (AUS)	6.600	7.433		14.033

=== Rings ===
The final was held on 5 October. Arthur Zanetti, the Olympic champion on this event, won the gold.

Position	Gymnast	D Score	E Score	Penalty	Total
1st place, gold medalist(s)	Arthur Zanetti (BRA)	6.800	9.000		15.800
2nd place, silver medalist(s)	Aleksandr Balandin (RUS)	6.900	8.833		15.733
3rd place, bronze medalist(s)	Brandon Wynn (USA)	6.700	8.966		15.666
4	Liu Yang (CHN)	6.800	8.833		15.633
5	Yuri van Gelder (NED)	6.900	8.633		15.533
6	Samir Aït Saïd (FRA)	6.800	8.700		15.500
7	Koji Yamamuro (JPN)	6.800	8.633		15.433
8	Danny Pinheiro (FRA)	6.900	7.666		14.566

=== Vault ===
The final was held on 6 October. The Olympic vault champion, Yang Hak-Seon, took the gold. Shirai originated a new skill on this apparatus as well at these championships, the Shirai or Shirai-Kim on vault, or a Yurchenko (round off–back handspring entry onto platform) triple twist/full or triple-twisiting Yurchenko (TTY).

Rank	Gymnast	D Score	E Score	Pen.	Score 1	D Score	E Score	Pen.	Score 2	Total
1st place, gold medalist(s)	Yang Hak-Seon (KOR)	6.400	9.333		15.733	6.000	9.333		15.333	15.533
2nd place, silver medalist(s)	Steven Legendre (USA)	6.000	9.266		15.266	6.000	9.233		15.233	15.249
3rd place, bronze medalist(s)	Kristian Thomas (GBR)	6.000	9.500		15.500	5.600	9.366		14.966	15.233
4	Kenzo Shirai (JPN)	6.000	9.466	0.1	15.366	5.600	9.300		14.900	15.133
5	Sergio Sasaki (BRA)	6.000	9.333		15.333	5.600	9.266		14.866	15.099
6	Diego Hypólito (BRA)	5.600	9.336		14.966	5.800	9.333		15.133	15.049
7	Marius Berbecar (ROU)	5.600	9.200		14.800	5.600	9.300		14.900	14.850
8	Oleg Verniaiev (UKR)	6.000	9.133		15.133	6.000	8.066	0.3	13.766	14.449

=== Parallel bars ===
The final was held on 6 October. Kōhei Uchimura of Japan and Lin Chaopan of China shared the gold medal.

Position	Gymnast	D Score	E Score	Penalty	Total
1st place, gold medalist(s)	Kōhei Uchimura (JPN)	6.700	8.966		15.666
1st place, gold medalist(s)	Lin Chaopan (CHN)	6.700	8.966		15.666
3rd place, bronze medalist(s)	John Orozco (USA)	6.800	8.733		15.533
4	You Hao (CHN)	6.900	8.600		15.500
5	Epke Zonderland (NED)	6.500	8.800		15.300
6	Marius Berbecar (ROU)	6.500	8.500		15.000
7	Brandon Wynn (USA)	6.300	7.966		14.266
8	Vasileios Tsolakidis (GRE)	5.600	7.833		13.433
9	Anton Fokin (UZB)	5.500	6.966		12.466

=== Horizontal bar ===
The final was held on 6 October. Epke Zonderland, the reigning Olympic champion, had a routine "full of gravity-defying leaps" and won the gold medal.

Position	Gymnast	D Score	E Score	Penalty	Total
1st place, gold medalist(s)	Epke Zonderland (NED)	7.700	8.300		16.000
2nd place, silver medalist(s)	Fabian Hambüchen (GER)	7.400	8.533		15.933
3rd place, bronze medalist(s)	Kōhei Uchimura (JPN)	6.900	8.733		15.633
4	Samuel Mikulak (USA)	6.900	8.666		15.566
5	Jossimar Calvo (COL)	7.200	8.266		15.466
6	Andreas Bretschneider (GER)	6.900	8.258		15.158
7	Ryohei Kato (JPN)	6.400	8.625		15.025
8	Lin Chaopan (CHN)	6.900	8.000		14.900

== Women's results ==
=== Individual all-around ===
The final was held on 4 October. The top two finishers were Simone Biles and Kyla Ross, both of the United States. It was the third time that the US won the World Championship all-around gold and silver medals. Ross led going into the final apparatus, floor exercise, but Biles had a higher difficulty score and overtook Ross to win the gold medal by 0.884 points. Russia's Aliya Mustafina, the 2010 champion in this event, won the bronze.

Rank	Gymnast	Vault (gymnastics)	Uneven bars	Balance beam	Floor (gymnastics)	Total
1st place, gold medalist(s)	Simone Biles (USA)	15.850	14.700	14.433	15.233	60.216
2nd place, silver medalist(s)	Kyla Ross (USA)	15.366	15.100	14.533	14.333	59.332
3rd place, bronze medalist(s)	Aliya Mustafina (RUS)	14.891	15.233	14.166	14.566	58.856
4	Larisa Iordache (ROU)	15.033	14.200	13.833	14.700	57.766
5	Yao Jinnan (CHN)	14.800	15.333	13.633	13.866	57.632
6	Vanessa Ferrari (ITA)	14.400	13.700	14.166	14.466	56.732
7	Giulia Steingruber (SUI)	15.300	13.200	13.733	14.466	56.699
8	Shang Chunsong (CHN)	14.000	14.466	13.700	13.966	56.132
9	Asuka Teramoto (JPN)	14.000	14.033	14.033	13.466	55.532
10	Victoria Moors (CAN)	14.733	13.800	12.300	14.633	55.466
11	Carlotta Ferlito (ITA)	14.333	13.233	14.100	13.733	55.399
12	Roxana Popa (ESP)	14.800	13.533	12.933	14.100	55.366
13	Ellie Black (CAN)	14.533	12.866	14.133	13.433	54.965
14	Noémi Makra (HUN)	13.700	13.633	13.900	13.533	54.766
15	Elisabeth Seitz (GER)	14.833	13.733	12.433	12.666	53.665
16	Anna Rodionova (RUS)	14.141	13.758	12.066	13.333	53.298
17	Ruby Harrold (GBR)	13.900	14.533	11.066	13.700	53.199
18	Gaelle Mys (BEL)	13.958	12.366	13.666	12.966	52.956
19	Rebecca Tunney (GBR)	14.866	13.033	11.966	13.000	52.865
20	Noël van Klaveren (NED)	14.966	10.633	12.733	13.633	51.965
21	Laura Waem (BEL)	13.800	13.533	12.233	12.366	51.932
22	Ilaria Kaeslin (SUI)	13.800	13.100	12.433	12.233	51.566
23	Natsumi Sasada (JPN)	13.966	10.366	13.500	13.233	51.065
24	Vasiliki Millousi (GRE)	13.166	10.500	12.800	13.066	49.532

=== Vault ===
The final was held on 5 October. Defending champion McKayla Maroney received 15.724 points and won the gold medal. As the last gymnast to perform, she nearly stuck her Amanar vault for a 15.966, and then her Yurchenko half-on, front layout full off earned a score of 15.483. Simone Biles, who had won the all-around title the day before, won silver in this event. 2008 Olympic Vault Champion Hong Un Jong took the bronze.

Rank	Gymnast	D Score	E Score	Pen.	Score 1	D Score	E Score	Pen.	Score 2	Total
1st place, gold medalist(s)	McKayla Maroney (USA)	6.300	9.766	0.1	15.966	6.000	9.483		15.483	15.724
2nd place, silver medalist(s)	Simone Biles (USA)	6.300	9.633		15.933	5.600	9.658		15.258	15.595
3rd place, bronze medalist(s)	Hong Un-Jong (PRK)	6.300	9.266		15.566	6.400	9.000		15.400	15.483
4	Giulia Steingruber (SUI)	6.200	9.300		15.500	5.800	9.166		14.966	15.233
5	Oksana Chusovitina (UZB)	6.200	8.533	0.1	14.633	5.500	9.033		14.533	14.583
6	Phan Thị Hà Thanh (VIE)	6.200	8.866	0.1	14.966	5.800	7.933	0.1	13.633	14.299
7	Yamilet Peña (DOM)	7.000	7.766	0.3	14.466	5.800	7.666		13.466	13.966
8	Chantysha Netteb (NED)	5.800	8.100		13.900	0.000	0.000		0.000	6.950

=== Uneven bars ===
The final was held on 5 October. Kyla Ross, who had won the all-around silver medal the day before, won another silver in this event. Huang Huidan took the gold, and Olympic champion Aliya Mustafina took the bronze.

Position	Gymnast	D Score	E Score	Penalty	Total
1st place, gold medalist(s)	Huang Huidan (CHN)	6.600	8.800		15.400
2nd place, silver medalist(s)	Kyla Ross (USA)	6.400	8.866		15.266
3rd place, bronze medalist(s)	Aliya Mustafina (RUS)	6.500	8.533		15.033
4	Simone Biles (USA)	6.100	8.616		14.716
5	Sophie Scheder (GER)	6.400	8.283		14.683
6	Yao Jinnan (CHN)	6.900	7.733		14.633
7	Ruby Harrold (GBR)	6.300	8.033		14.333
8	Becky Downie (GBR)	6.400	7.400		13.800

=== Balance beam ===
The final was held on 6 October. Aliya Mustafina won the gold medal, finishing ahead of Americans Kyla Ross and Simone Biles. All three filed petitions to change their difficulty scores but only Ross' and Biles' were accepted.

Position	Gymnast	D Score	E Score	Penalty	Total
1st place, gold medalist(s)	Aliya Mustafina (RUS)	6.000	8.900		14.900
2nd place, silver medalist(s)	Kyla Ross (USA)	6.000	8.833		14.833
3rd place, bronze medalist(s)	Simone Biles (USA)	6.100	8.233		14.333
4	Vanessa Ferrari (ITA)	5.700	8.600		14.300
5	Carlotta Ferlito (ITA)	5.900	8.383		14.283
6	Shang Chunsong (CHN)	6.200	7.933		14.133
7	Larisa Iordache (ROU)	6.300	7.633		13.933
8	Anna Rodionova (RUS)	5.700	7.400		13.100

=== Floor ===
The final was held on 6 October. Simone Biles won her second gold and fourth total medal of the competition. 2006 World all-around champion Vanessa Ferrari took the silver. Romanian Olympic medalist Larisa Iordache got the bronze medal.

Position	Gymnast	D Score	E Score	Penalty	Total
1st place, gold medalist(s)	Simone Biles (USA)	6.500	8.500		15.000
2nd place, silver medalist(s)	Vanessa Ferrari (ITA)	6.200	8.433		14.633
3rd place, bronze medalist(s)	Larisa Iordache (ROU)	6.100	8.500		14.600
4	Mai Murakami (JPN)	6.200	8.266		14.466
5	Kyla Ross (USA)	5.700	8.633		14.333
5	Giulia Steingruber (SUI)	6.100	8.233		14.333
7	Sandra Izbașa (ROU)	6.100	7.633		13.733
8	Ellie Black (CAN)	5.700	7.966	0.1	13.566

== Qualification ==
=== Men's qualification ===
Rank	Gymnast	Nation	Floor (gymnastics)	Pommel horse	Rings (gymnastics)	Vault (gymnastics)	Parallel bars	Horizontal bar	Total
1	Kohei Uchimura	Japan	6.400 15.333 ﴾3﴿	6.200 15.133 ﴾10﴿	6.200 15.000 ﴾17﴿	6.000 15.400 ﴾1﴿	6.400 15.400 ﴾10﴿	6.900 15.658 ﴾1﴿	91.924
2	Samuel Mikulak	United States	6.200 15.033 ﴾9﴿	6.000 14.233 ﴾36﴿	6.000 14.700 ﴾22﴿	5.600 14.800 ﴾25﴿	6.200 15.400 ﴾9﴿	6.900 15.366 ﴾4﴿	89.532
3	Ryohei Kato	Japan	6.700 14.933 ﴾15﴿	6.200 14.600 ﴾21﴿	6.000 14.700 ﴾22﴿	5.600 14.766 ﴾27﴿	6.500 15.400 ﴾12﴿	6.400 15.075 ﴾7﴿	89.474
4	Chaopan Lin	China	6.100 14.566 ﴾32﴿	6.100 14.733 ﴾18﴿	5.900 14.266 ﴾42﴿	6.000 15.066 ﴾9﴿	6.700 15.733 ﴾3﴿	6.900 15.066 ﴾8﴿	89.43
5	Shixiong Zhou	China	6.500 14.733 ﴾26﴿	5.900 14.600 ﴾20﴿	6.000 13.900 ﴾56﴿	5.600 14.933 ﴾13﴿	7.000 15.666 ﴾5﴿	7.000 15.066 ﴾9﴿	88.898
6	Sergio Sasaki Junior	Brazil	6.700 15.000 ﴾11﴿	6.300 14.300 ﴾33﴿	6.000 14.500 ﴾30﴿	6.000 15.333 ﴾3﴿	6.300 14.900 ﴾29﴿	6.800 14.666 ﴾17﴿	88.699
7	Fabian Hambuechen	Germany	6.300 15.266 ﴾4﴿	5.100 12.366 ﴾93﴿	5.900 14.866 ﴾18﴿	5.600 14.933 ﴾13﴿	6.600 15.000 ﴾27﴿	7.100 15.633 ﴾2﴿	88.064
8	Daniel Purvis	United Kingdom	6.500 15.266 ﴾5﴿	6.200 14.666 ﴾19﴿	5.900 14.466 ﴾32﴿	5.600 14.900 ﴾16﴿	6.300 15.000 ﴾26﴿	5.800 12.733 ﴾86﴿	87.031
9	Oliver Hegi	Switzerland	5.800 14.033 ﴾54﴿	6.300 14.766 ﴾17﴿	5.500 14.200 ﴾45﴿	5.200 14.433 ﴾41﴿	6.400 15.200 ﴾16﴿	5.900 14.366 ﴾29﴿	86.998
10	Max Whitlock	United Kingdom	6.700 14.533 ﴾34﴿	6.600 15.408 ﴾7﴿	4.900 12.900 ﴾88﴿	5.600 14.900 ﴾16﴿	6.000 14.600 ﴾37﴿	6.200 14.600 ﴾18﴿	86.941
11	Jossimar Calvo	Colombia	6.600 14.066 ﴾50﴿	6.400 14.308 ﴾31﴿	6.300 14.166 ﴾47﴿	5.600 14.000 ﴾66﴿	6.900 15.233 ﴾15﴿	7.100 15.166 ﴾5﴿	86.939
12	Andrey Likhovitskiy	Belarus	5.600 14.383 ﴾40﴿	6.400 13.800 ﴾49﴿	5.600 14.033 ﴾52﴿	5.200 14.400 ﴾44﴿	6.000 15.000 ﴾25﴿	6.400 14.600 ﴾21﴿	86.216
13	Fabián González	Spain	6.200 14.800 ﴾22﴿	5.900 14.300 ﴾32﴿	5.200 13.900 ﴾55﴿	5.600 15.033 ﴾11﴿	6.000 14.733 ﴾31﴿	6.400 13.366 ﴾58﴿	86.132
14	David Belyavskiy	Russia	6.400 14.966 ﴾14﴿	6.400 14.800 ﴾16﴿	5.900 14.400 ﴾34﴿	5.600 14.733 ﴾29﴿	6.500 13.066 ﴾92﴿	6.200 14.100 ﴾37﴿	86.065
15	Minsoo Park	South Korea	5.900 14.166 ﴾46﴿	5.900 14.000 ﴾45﴿	5.800 13.966 ﴾53﴿	5.200 14.433 ﴾41﴿	6.500 14.233 ﴾47﴿	6.800 14.733 ﴾16﴿	85.531
16	Oleg Verniaiev	Ukraine	6.500 14.866 ﴾19﴿	6.500 13.533 ﴾54﴿	6.400 14.866 ﴾19﴿	6.000 15.283 ﴾4﴿	6.800 15.200 ﴾17﴿	6.200 11.633 ﴾121	85.381
17	Bart Deurloo	Netherlands	5.900 14.733 ﴾25﴿	5.900 14.266 ﴾34﴿	5.800 14.300 ﴾39﴿	5.600 14.600 ﴾33﴿	5.900 13.733 ﴾66﴿	6.400 13.733 ﴾46﴿	85.365
18	Arthur Oyakawa Mariano	Brazil	6.400 14.800 ﴾23﴿	5.900 13.800 ﴾48﴿	5.700 14.200 ﴾46﴿	5.600 14.866 ﴾19﴿	5.800 14.366 ﴾43﴿	6.200 13.158 ﴾65﴿	85.19
19	Casimir Schmidt	Netherlands	6.300 15.000 ﴾10﴿	4.600 13.066 ﴾71﴿	5.400 14.200 ﴾44﴿	5.600 14.866 ﴾19﴿	5.400 14.000 ﴾54﴿	5.200 13.566 ﴾52﴿	84.698
20	Néstor Abad	Spain	6.100 14.833 ﴾20﴿	4.900 13.283 ﴾63﴿	6.100 14.666 ﴾26﴿	5.600 14.566 ﴾36﴿	5.600 12.900 ﴾96﴿	5.800 14.300 ﴾33﴿	84.548
21	Arnaud Willig	France	5.900 13.366 ﴾80﴿	5.600 14.233 ﴾35﴿	5.800 13.833 ﴾57﴿	5.600 13.883 ﴾69﴿	6.200 14.333 ﴾44﴿	6.200 14.366 ﴾30﴿	84.014
22	Pablo Braegger	Switzerland	5.700 14.200 ﴾44﴿	5.500 13.466 ﴾58﴿	5.400 13.600 ﴾65﴿	5.200 14.333 ﴾49﴿	5.900 13.466 ﴾78﴿	6.300 14.833 ﴾13﴿	83.898
23	Angel Ramos Rivera	Puerto Rico	6.000 14.566 ﴾31﴿	5.700 13.708 ﴾52﴿	4.800 12.633 ﴾105	5.200 14.500 ﴾38﴿	5.300 13.333 ﴾80﴿	6.200 14.600 ﴾18﴿	83.34
24	Gustavo Palma Simoes	Portugal	5.600 13.533 ﴾73﴿	6.100 14.033 ﴾40﴿	6.100 14.433 ﴾33﴿	4.800 13.833 ﴾71﴿	5.400 13.866 ﴾60﴿	5.400 13.608 ﴾50﴿	83.306
25	Rokas Guščinas	Lithuania	5.000 13.533 ﴾72﴿	6.200 14.433 ﴾26﴿	5.900 14.300 ﴾40﴿	4.800 13.358 ﴾96﴿	5.400 14.066 ﴾52﴿	5.700 13.466 ﴾55﴿	83.156
26	Naoya Tsukahara	Australia	4.600 13.550 ﴾71﴿	5.500 14.008 ﴾44﴿	6.200 13.466 ﴾66﴿	5.200 14.233 ﴾53﴿	6.400 13.633 ﴾71﴿	5.300 14.075 ﴾38﴿	82.965
27	Cristian Ioan Bataga	Romania	6.100 13.933 ﴾59﴿	6.100 13.366 ﴾62﴿	6.100 13.700 ﴾61﴿	5.600 14.666 ﴾32﴿	5.800 14.000 ﴾55﴿	5.800 12.933 ﴾77﴿	82.598
28	Stepan Gorbachev	Kazakhstan	5.400 14.100 ﴾48﴿	5.200 13.800 ﴾47﴿	3.800 12.025 ﴾119	5.200 14.566 ﴾36﴿	5.500 13.666 ﴾68﴿	5.600 14.000 ﴾39﴿	82.157
29	Andrew Smith	Ireland	6.000 14.966 ﴾13﴿	4.800 13.066 ﴾72﴿	4.900 12.833 ﴾90﴿	5.200 14.400 ﴾44﴿	5.000 13.800 ﴾63﴿	5.000 12.866 ﴾80﴿	81.931
30	Martin Konečný	Czech Republic	5.800 14.466 ﴾36﴿	4.100 12.500 ﴾87﴿	4.900 12.933 ﴾85﴿	5.200 13.733 ﴾75﴿	5.400 12.866 ﴾100	6.200 14.600 ﴾18﴿	81.098
31	Daniel Radovesnický	Czech Republic	5.500 13.900 ﴾60﴿	4.300 12.733 ﴾78﴿	4.900 13.400 ﴾70﴿	4.400 13.100 ﴾110	5.200 13.900 ﴾59﴿	5.500 13.800 ﴾42﴿	80.833
32	Karl Oskar Kirmes	Finland	5.900 14.633 ﴾27﴿	5.100 13.000 ﴾73﴿	5.200 12.733 ﴾97﴿	4.400 13.566 ﴾82﴿	5.000 13.600 ﴾72﴿	5.500 13.300 ﴾59﴿	80.832
33	Anton Fokin	Uzbekistan	4.800 13.633 ﴾68﴿	5.800 13.433 ﴾60﴿	5.200 11.266 ﴾130	4.400 13.533 ﴾84﴿	6.900 15.800 ﴾2﴿	4.700 13.000 ﴾70﴿	80.665
34	Osvaldo Martinez Erazun	Argentina	5.500 13.166 ﴾84﴿	4.800 12.733 ﴾79﴿	5.700 14.300 ﴾38﴿	4.800 13.800 ﴾73﴿	5.700 13.066 ﴾91﴿	5.800 13.300 ﴾60﴿	80.365
35	Heikki Niva	Finland	5.200 13.800 ﴾64﴿	4.700 13.266 ﴾64﴿	4.300 12.733 ﴾96﴿	4.400 13.633 ﴾80﴿	5.000 14.133 ﴾49﴿	5.000 12.658 ﴾87﴿	80.223
36	Stian Skjerahaug	Norway	5.200 14.133 ﴾47﴿	5.900 12.633 ﴾82﴿	4.700 12.700 ﴾98﴿	4.800 13.700 ﴾76﴿	5.300 13.833 ﴾61﴿	5.100 13.066 ﴾66﴿	80.065
37	Jimmy Verbaeys	Belgium	6.000 14.033 ﴾53﴿	5.300 11.200 ﴾121	5.500 13.366 ﴾73﴿	5.200 14.233 ﴾53﴿	6.200 13.733 ﴾65﴿	5.400 13.266 ﴾61﴿	79.831
38	Javier Balboa Gonzalez	Mexico	5.000 13.133 ﴾87﴿	5.000 12.566 ﴾85﴿	6.100 13.733 ﴾59﴿	5.200 14.200 ﴾57﴿	6.100 14.266 ﴾46﴿	5.400 11.666 ﴾119	79.564
39	Robert Tvorogal	Lithuania	5.000 11.966 ﴾124	4.900 11.666 ﴾111	5.300 12.666 ﴾104	4.800 13.766 ﴾74﴿	5.500 14.141 ﴾48﴿	5.200 14.133 ﴾36﴿	78.338
40	Jose Alejandro Manama Castillo	Venezuela	5.900 13.533 ﴾74﴿	4.500 10.466 ﴾134	4.900 12.900 ﴾88﴿	6.000 14.866 ﴾19﴿	5.800 13.266 ﴾81﴿	5.600 13.266 ﴾62﴿	78.297
41	Eduard Shaulov	Uzbekistan	5.900 12.766 ﴾98﴿	4.100 11.566 ﴾116	4.600 12.466 ﴾108	4.400 13.558 ﴾83﴿	5.400 14.100 ﴾51﴿	4.700 13.600 ﴾51﴿	78.056
42	Robert Tee Kriangkum	Thailand	5.600 13.500 ﴾76﴿	5.200 12.366 ﴾94﴿	5.600 12.833 ﴾91﴿	5.600 14.308 ﴾50﴿	4.600 12.350 ﴾122	5.300 12.600 ﴾89﴿	77.957
43	Hellal Metidji	Algeria	5.100 12.466 ﴾112	5.200 13.625 ﴾53﴿	4.600 12.200 ﴾115	4.800 13.533 ﴾84﴿	5.000 13.166 ﴾83﴿	5.100 12.900 ﴾79﴿	77.89
44	Bence Talas	Hungary	5.700 12.400 ﴾117	5.800 13.366 ﴾61﴿	5.700 13.200 ﴾79﴿	5.200 14.066 ﴾62﴿	5.400 11.400 ﴾136	6.200 13.366 ﴾57﴿	77.798
45	Daan Kenis	Belgium	6.000 13.566 ﴾69﴿	5.300 12.466 ﴾89﴿	5.200 13.433 ﴾67﴿	5.200 14.500 ﴾38﴿	4.900 10.966 ﴾139	5.600 12.766 ﴾85﴿	77.697
46	Christopher O'Connor	Ireland	5.600 14.033 ﴾51﴿	4.500 11.800 ﴾106	5.100 13.666 ﴾62﴿	4.400 13.533 ﴾84﴿	5.200 12.866 ﴾99﴿	4.400 11.600 ﴾123	77.498
47	Lars Joyce Planke	Norway	5.500 13.033 ﴾90﴿	4.000 11.933 ﴾101	5.000 13.266 ﴾76﴿	5.200 14.066 ﴾62﴿	4.600 12.000 ﴾132	5.400 13.033 ﴾68﴿	77.331
48	Marcus Conradi	Norway	5.300 13.466 ﴾77﴿	5.000 12.800 ﴾77﴿	5.500 12.466 ﴾109	5.200 13.900 ﴾67﴿	4.800 12.866 ﴾97﴿	4.900 11.766 ﴾116	77.264
49	Ashish Kumar	India	6.600 14.033 ﴾56﴿	5.800 12.366 ﴾95﴿	4.900 11.733 ﴾120	5.600 13.233 ﴾104	6.000 13.075 ﴾89﴿	4.900 11.966 ﴾110	76.406
50	Alen Dimic	Slovenia	5.100 12.633 ﴾106	4.400 12.400 ﴾92﴿	5.000 13.366 ﴾72﴿	5.200 12.700 ﴾118	5.900 12.300 ﴾124	6.100 13.000 ﴾72﴿	76.399
51	Lin Yi-chieh	Chinese Taipei	5.500 12.700 ﴾101	4.300 11.166 ﴾123		4.900 12.933 ﴾85﴿		4.400 12.533 ﴾92﴿	76.398
52	Nattawat Phochat	Thailand	5.800 13.566 ﴾70﴿	5.300 11.866 ﴾105		4.600 12.100 ﴾117		4.700 12.600 ﴾88﴿	76.148
53	Saeed Reza Keikha	Iran	5.400 13.333 ﴾81﴿	6.100 11.466 ﴾117		5.500 13.300 ﴾75﴿		4.800 12.433 ﴾99﴿	75.832
54	Velislav Valchev	Bulgaria	5.200 13.366 ﴾79﴿	4.600 11.900 ﴾103		5.800 12.166 ﴾116		5.700 12.933 ﴾75﴿	75.398
55	Tiaan Grobler	South Africa	5.100 13.266 ﴾83﴿	5.100 11.791 ﴾107		5.100 12.700 ﴾99﴿		4.400 12.533 ﴾92﴿	75.222
56	Olafur Gardar Gunnarsson	Iceland	4.800 12.266 ﴾119	4.200 11.700 ﴾110		4.500 12.433 ﴾110		4.500 12.833 ﴾81﴿	75.064
57	Tarik Byfield	Costa Rica	6.100 13.866 ﴾62﴿	4.500 10.800 ﴾128		4.900 12.666 ﴾102		4.800 12.300 ﴾102	74.964
58	Matthias Schwab	Austria	5.500 10.933 ﴾135	4.400 12.300 ﴾96﴿		5.000 12.666 ﴾103		5.700 12.500 ﴾97﴿	74.932
59	Jie Gabriel Gan Zi	Singapore	4.800 11.833 ﴾126	5.500 14.041 ﴾39﴿		3.200 10.033 ﴾136		4.500 12.333 ﴾101	74.74
60	Vladislav Esaulov	Lithuania	4.800 12.733 ﴾99﴿	4.200 10.566 ﴾132		4.800 12.900 ﴾87﴿		4.200 11.958 ﴾111	74.456
61	David Bishop	New Zealand	5.500 13.966 ﴾58﴿	4.400 10.300 ﴾138		3.900 12.766 ﴾93﴿		5.000 12.833 ﴾82﴿	74.431
62	Hung-Sheng Lu	Chinese Taipei	4.300 13.066 ﴾89﴿	4.900 10.891 ﴾127		4.800 12.633 ﴾105		4.300 12.966 ﴾73﴿	74.422
63	Oualid Hacib	Algeria	4.700 13.400 ﴾78﴿	4.800 10.466 ﴾135		5.200 12.700 ﴾100		3.700 11.700 ﴾118	74.199
64	Siphesihle Biyase	South Africa	5.200 12.100 ﴾121	4.800 11.966 ﴾100		3.200 11.600 ﴾122		4.500 12.500 ﴾95﴿	74.199
65	Mynor Antonio Juarez Morataya	Guatemala	4.700 13.133 ﴾86﴿	5.400 11.066 ﴾126		4.700 10.766 ﴾133		5.300 12.566 ﴾91﴿	74.197
66	Abhijit Shinde	India	5.400 13.166 ﴾85﴿	4.200 11.300 ﴾119		4.800 12.083 ﴾118		4.200 11.966 ﴾109	74.148
67	Anthony O'Donnell	Ireland	5.500 12.433 ﴾115	?	9.866 ﴾141	4.900 13.133 ﴾82﴿		4.100 12.033 ﴾107	73.464
68	Yordan Aleksandrov	Bulgaria	5.400 11.533 ﴾131	4.000 11.591 ﴾115		4.500 11.633 ﴾121		5.100 12.441 ﴾98﴿	72.864
69	Paata Nozadze	Georgia	5.200 12.933 ﴾93﴿	4.500 11.233 ﴾120		3.700 10.300 ﴾135		3.200 10.583 ﴾130	71.615
70	Alon Hasa	Albania	4.400 11.533 ﴾130	4.700 12.533 ﴾86﴿		4.800 12.566 ﴾107		3.900 11.633 ﴾120	71.331
71	Audrys Nin Reyes	Dominican Republic	6.300 11.633 ﴾129	4.400 10.366 ﴾137		5.200 11.600 ﴾124		5.500 10.733 ﴾128	71.198
72	Michael Makings	South Africa	4.900 11.100 ﴾134	4.900 10.533 ﴾133		4.800 12.800 ﴾92﴿		4.900 10.683 ﴾129	70.716
73	Jorge Alfredo Vega Lopez	Guatemala	6.400 11.666 ﴾128	3.9	8.366 ﴾148	5.200 12.266 ﴾112		4.300 11.266 ﴾124	70.496
74	Kai-Yu Chung	Chinese Taipei	4.600 12.633 ﴾105	5.100 10.800 ﴾129		3.600 11.333 ﴾126		3.700 11.600 ﴾122	70.407
75	Ruslan Namazov	Azerbaijan	4.400 11.100 ﴾133	3.7	9.391 ﴾144	3.500 11.600 ﴾123		3.100 11.766 ﴾115	69.79
76	Luis Alejandro Soto Mendez	Costa Rica	4.200 12.441 ﴾114	3	8.600 ﴾146	4.000 10.533 ﴾134	2.900 10.533 ﴾131	2.900 10.533 ﴾131	67.54
77	Jón Gunnarsson	Iceland	4.000 12.658 ﴾104	2.7	5.966 ﴾149	4.700 11.333 ﴾129	3.200 11.733 ﴾117	3.200 11.733 ﴾117	67.389
78	Henry Gonzalez Vega	Costa Rica	5.300 10.700 ﴾136	4.5	9.833 ﴾142	4.400 11.333 ﴾127	3.100 10.333 ﴾133	3.100 10.333 ﴾133	66.465
79	Adickxon Gabriel Trejo Basalo	Venezuela	6.000 12.800 ﴾97﴿	5.600 12.833 ﴾76﴿		5.500 13.166 ﴾81﴿	5.700 12.600 ﴾90﴿	5.700 12.600 ﴾90﴿	65.565
80	Thanh Tung Le	Vietnam	6.000 14.033 ﴾55﴿	3.8	9.633 ﴾143	5.700 13.400 ﴾71﴿	4.900 13.000 ﴾71﴿	4.900 13.000 ﴾71﴿	63.299
81	Wei An Terry Tay	Singapore	5.200 11.833 ﴾127	3.5	8.400 ﴾147	4.600 11.333 ﴾128	2.3	2.3	62.632
82	Rakesh Patra	India		5.300 11.633 ﴾113		6.100 13.666 ﴾63﴿	5.100 11.800 ﴾114	5.100 11.800 ﴾114	62.332
83	Andreas Toba	Germany	5.800 13.000 ﴾91﴿	5.700 14.400 ﴾27﴿		6.300 14.400 ﴾35﴿			56.566
84	Christian Baumann	Switzerland		5.400 13.200 ﴾68﴿		5.100 14.133 ﴾48﴿	5.400 12.166 ﴾103	5.400 12.166 ﴾103	54.065
85	Nandor Szabo	Hungary	5.200 13.300 ﴾82﴿			5.300 13.066 ﴾84﴿	5.200 13.366 ﴾56﴿	5.200 13.366 ﴾56﴿	53.332
86	Junior Rojo Mendoza	Venezuela	5.600 12.633 ﴾109			5.500 12.766 ﴾94﴿			52.765
87	Dávid Vecsernyés	Hungary	5.200 12.983 ﴾92﴿			4.800 13.233 ﴾77﴿	5.900 12.100 ﴾106	5.900 12.100 ﴾106	52.082
88	Carlos Calvo	Colombia		5.300 13.266 ﴾65﴿		5.900 12.233 ﴾114	5.800 13.200 ﴾64﴿	5.800 13.200 ﴾64﴿	51.465
89	Callum Phillips	New Zealand	5.000 12.633 ﴾107	4.700 11.433 ﴾118					50.899
90	Joao Fuglsig	Denmark	5.400 12.733 ﴾100			3.900 12.266 ﴾111			50.798
91	Marcus Frandsen	Denmark		5.000 12.733 ﴾80﴿		3.600 10.800 ﴾132			48.632
92	Ahmed Aldayani	Qatar	5.500 12.566 ﴾110	4.900 10.400 ﴾136			5.200 11.900 ﴾112	5.200 11.900 ﴾112	47.532
93	Joel Alvarez Vergara	Chile		4.3	9.900 ﴾140	4.500 11.200 ﴾131			45.266
94	Daniel Corral Barron	Mexico		6.700 15.600 ﴾2﴿		6.100 14.333 ﴾37﴿			44.941
95	John Orozco	United States		6.600 13.800 ﴾50﴿			6.600 14.791 ﴾14﴿	6.600 14.791 ﴾14﴿	44.024
96	Scott Morgan	Canada	6.400 15.100 ﴾7﴿			6.500 14.133 ﴾50﴿			43.958
97	Denis Ablyazin	Russia	7.200 14.600 ﴾30﴿			6.800 14.800 ﴾21﴿			43.5
98	Maksym Semiankiv	Ukraine		6.300 14.366 ﴾30﴿			6.500 14.533 ﴾25﴿	6.500 14.533 ﴾25﴿	43.399
99	Javier Gómez Fuertes	Spain				6.300 14.300 ﴾41﴿	6.000 14.000 ﴾40﴿	6.000 14.000 ﴾40﴿	42.966
100	Pavel Bulauski	Belarus	5.900 14.500 ﴾35﴿			5.900 13.933 ﴾54﴿			42.799
101	Artsiom Bykau	Belarus		6.000 14.566 ﴾23﴿	5.800 14.333 ﴾36﴿			5.400 13.633 ﴾49﴿	42.532
102	Wai Hung Shek	Hong Kong				6.000 14.925 ﴾15﴿	6.200 12.633 ﴾107	6.400 14.566 ﴾23﴿	42.124
103	Isaac Botella Pérez	Spain	6.000 14.300 ﴾41﴿	5.300 12.666 ﴾81﴿		5.600 14.800 ﴾25﴿			41.766
104	Flavius Koczi	Romania	7.000 14.933 ﴾16﴿	5.300 11.766 ﴾108		6.000 14.900 ﴾16﴿			41.599
105	Kevin Lytwyn	Canada	6.200 14.900 ﴾17﴿		6.200 14.533 ﴾29﴿			5.200 12.100 ﴾105	41.533
106	Christopher Jursch	Germany		5.600 13.500 ﴾55﴿			5.900 14.900 ﴾28﴿	6.800 12.933 ﴾78﴿	41.333
107	Alexander Rodríguez	Puerto Rico	5.600 14.033 ﴾51﴿	6.300 14.400 ﴾29﴿				5.500 12.800 ﴾84﴿	41.233
108	Ricardo Martins	Portugal	5.200 13.833 ﴾63﴿		5.700 14.133 ﴾49﴿			5.300 13.033 ﴾67﴿	40.999
109	Mauro Martinez	Argentina	5.900 13.900 ﴾61﴿		5.000 12.233 ﴾113	5.600 14.433 ﴾41﴿			40.566
110	Vitalijs Kardasovs	Latvia	6.000 13.766 ﴾65﴿			5.600 14.500 ﴾38﴿		4.500 12.100 ﴾104	40.366
111	Ga Ram Bae	South Korea		5.200 11.133 ﴾125			5.900 14.133 ﴾50﴿	6.500 14.866 ﴾11﴿	40.132
112	Aleksandar Batinkov	Bulgaria	6.100 14.266 ﴾43﴿				5.600 12.566 ﴾110	6.000 13.266 ﴾63﴿	40.098
113	Javier Cervantes Quezada	Mexico			5.600 13.100 ﴾83﴿	5.600 14.400 ﴾44﴿	5.500 12.200 ﴾129		39.7
114	Simao Almeida	Portugal	5.600 12.900 ﴾94﴿		5.400 13.216 ﴾78﴿		5.000 13.566 ﴾76﴿		39.682
115	Sascha Palgen	Luxembourg	5.900 14.000 ﴾57﴿	5.000 11.933 ﴾102	5.800 13.700 ﴾60﴿				39.633
116	Mykyta Yermak	Ukraine	6.100 12.266 ﴾120		5.800 12.766 ﴾95﴿		5.900 14.266 ﴾45﴿		39.298
117	Luke Wiwatowski	Australia	6.300 12.666 ﴾103				5.800 12.600 ﴾108	6.300 14.000 ﴾41﴿	39.266
118	Nicolás Córdoba	Argentina		4.600 12.466 ﴾88﴿			4.300 12.400 ﴾118	6.400 14.200 ﴾35﴿	39.066
119	Paolo Principi	Italy	5.900 12.533 ﴾111	6.300 12.933 ﴾75﴿				5.700 13.525 ﴾54﴿	38.991
120	Shalva Dalakishvili	Georgia	5.100 12.433 ﴾116		5.700 13.200 ﴾79﴿			5.000 12.933 ﴾74﴿	38.566
120	Nam Dang	Vietnam		5.100 10.600 ﴾131	6.400 14.600 ﴾27﴿	5.600 13.366 ﴾94﴿			38.566
122	Phuong Thanh Dinh	Vietnam		5.300 11.200 ﴾121			5.900 12.266 ﴾125	5.400 13.733 ﴾44﴿	37.199
123	Man Hin Jim	Hong Kong				5.600 13.500 ﴾88﴿	3.800 10.000 ﴾142	4.300 11.233 ﴾125	34.733
124	Chun Kit Poon	Hong Kong	4.900 11.933 ﴾125	4.200 10.633 ﴾130				3.300 11.033 ﴾127	33.599
125	Kenzo Shirai	Japan	7.400 16.233 ﴾1﴿			6.000 15.400 ﴾1﴿			31.633
126	Brandon Wynn	United States			6.800 15.700 ﴾3﴿		6.600 15.466 ﴾7﴿		31.166
127	Epke Zonderland	Netherlands					6.400 15.400 ﴾10﴿	7.100 15.433 ﴾3﴿	30.833
128	Marius Daniel Berbecar	Romania				5.600 15.033 ﴾11﴿	6.700 15.600 ﴾6﴿		30.633
129	Diego Hypólito	Brazil	6.900 15.600 ﴾2﴿			5.600 14.816 ﴾24﴿			30.416
130	Jacob Dalton	United States	6.500 15.166 ﴾6﴿			6.000 15.133 ﴾8﴿			30.299
131	Kristian Thomas	United Kingdom				6.000 15.233 ﴾5﴿		7.000 15.033 ﴾10﴿	30.266
132	Alexander Naddour	United States		6.700 15.000 ﴾13﴿	6.600 15.100 ﴾13﴿				30.1
133	Andrei Vasile Muntean	Romania			6.400 15.066 ﴾16﴿		6.600 15.033 ﴾23﴿		30.099
134	Matthias Fahrig	Germany	7.000 15.000 ﴾12﴿			6.000 15.050 ﴾10﴿			30.05
135	Koji Yamamuro	Japan			6.600 15.500 ﴾8﴿			6.500 14.466 ﴾27﴿	29.966
136	Steven Legendre	United States	6.800 15.091 ﴾8﴿			6.000 14.833 ﴾22﴿			29.924
137	Axel Augis	France		6.000 14.575 ﴾22﴿			6.800 15.233 ﴾14﴿		29.808
138	Ibrahim Colak	Turkey			6.300 15.066 ﴾15﴿		5.600 14.600 ﴾36﴿		29.666
139	Jin Hyok Kim	North Korea			6.800 14.700 ﴾25﴿		6.800 14.900 ﴾30﴿		29.6
140	Igor Radivilov	Ukraine			6.700 14.233 ﴾43﴿	6.000 15.233 ﴾5﴿			29.466
141	Samuel Piasecký	Slovakia					6.500 14.733 ﴾32﴿	6.200 14.533 ﴾24﴿	29.266
141	Nguyễn Hà Thanh	Vietnam				6.000 14.200 ﴾57﴿	6.700 15.066 ﴾22﴿		29.266
143	Jorge Hugo Giraldo	Colombia		6.100 14.116 ﴾37﴿			6.400 15.133 ﴾18﴿		29.249
144	Cuong Hoang	Vietnam	6.600 14.600 ﴾29﴿				6.600 14.566 ﴾39﴿		29.166
145	Francisco Carlos Barretto Junior	Brazil					6.300 14.500 ﴾41﴿	6.500 14.600 ﴾22﴿	29.1
146	Juan Pablo Gonzalez Valenzuela	Chile	5.800 14.400 ﴾37﴿			5.600 14.600 ﴾33﴿			29
146	Hee Hoon Kim	South Korea	6.400 14.600 ﴾28﴿			6.000 14.400 ﴾44﴿			29
148	Emin Garibov	Russia					6.200 14.066 ﴾53﴿	7.300 14.866 ﴾12﴿	28.932
149	Andreas Bretschneider	Germany					6.000 13.666 ﴾70﴿	6.900 15.133 ﴾6﴿	28.799
150	Quazi Syque Caesar	Bangladesh					6.300 15.066 ﴾21﴿	5.600 13.533 ﴾53﴿	28.599
151	Se Gwang Ri	North Korea			6.800 14.133 ﴾51﴿	6.400 14.275 ﴾52﴿			28.408
152	Roman Kulesza	Poland					6.200 14.700 ﴾33﴿	6.400 13.666 ﴾48﴿	28.366
153	Eleftherios Kosmidis	Greece	6.700 14.900 ﴾18﴿				4.600 13.400 ﴾79﴿		28.3
154	Thomas Neuteleers	Belgium	6.100 14.200 ﴾45﴿				6.400 14.000 ﴾56﴿		28.2
155	Vasili Mikhalitsyn	Belarus		5.900 13.450 ﴾59﴿			5.800 14.666 ﴾34﴿		28.116
156	José Luis Fuentes Bustamante	Venezuela		6.400 14.033 ﴾42﴿			6.400 13.966 ﴾57﴿		27.999
157	Helge Vammen	Denmark		5.600 13.900 ﴾46﴿			4.900 13.700 ﴾67﴿		27.6
158	Marco Lodadio	Italy			5.600 13.633 ﴾64﴿	6.000 13.900 ﴾67﴿			27.533
159	Kevin Cerda Gastelum	Mexico	5.800 13.666 ﴾67﴿					5.400 13.733 ﴾44﴿	27.399
160	Wonyeong Wang	South Korea			5.600 13.366 ﴾74﴿		5.800 13.600 ﴾74﴿		26.966
161	Jihoon Kim	South Korea		4.900 12.300 ﴾97﴿				7.000 14.300 ﴾34﴿	26.6
162	Juan Sebastian Melchiori	Argentina	5.800 14.533 ﴾33﴿					4.100 12.000 ﴾108	26.533
163	Ossur Eiriksfoss	Denmark	5.000 12.300 ﴾118			5.200 14.133 ﴾60﴿			26.433
164	Dmitrijs Trefilovs	Latvia		5.600 12.600 ﴾83﴿				5.600 13.766 ﴾43﴿	26.366
165	Mario Valdes Santos	Mexico		5.000 12.441 ﴾90﴿		5.200 13.833 ﴾71﴿			26.274
166	Luis Vargas Velazquez	Puerto Rico					5.700 13.158 ﴾84﴿	5.500 13.033 ﴾69﴿	26.191
167	Rartchawat Kaewpanya	Thailand		6.400 13.500 ﴾57﴿			5.400 12.566 ﴾109		26.066
168	Diogo Lopes Romero	Portugal		5.200 12.033 ﴾98﴿			4.900 13.933 ﴾58﴿		25.966
168	Ferhat Arıcan	Turkey		6.900 13.233 ﴾67﴿			6.700 12.733 ﴾103		25.966
170	Kiu Chung Ng	Hong Kong	4.900 11.133 ﴾132		6.500 14.800 ﴾20﴿				25.933
171	Juan Francisco Raffo de la Jara	Chile		4.500 11.166 ﴾124	6.700 14.700 ﴾24﴿				25.866
172	Nodar Lionidze	Georgia				3.600 12.800 ﴾115	4.200 13.033 ﴾93﴿		25.833
173	Kasper Rydberg	Denmark	5.800 12.833 ﴾96﴿					4.800 12.800 ﴾83﴿	25.633
174	Ughur Khalilbayli	Azerbaijan	5.400 13.100 ﴾88﴿	4.900 12.433 ﴾91﴿					25.533
175	Andres Alejandro Arean	Argentina		4.700 12.000 ﴾99﴿			5.100 13.466 ﴾77﴿		?25.
176	Oleksandr Suprun	Ukraine	6.400 12.666 ﴾102				5.800 12.500 ﴾96﴿		25.166
177	Slavomir Michnak	Slovakia	5.300 10.066 ﴾137	5.900 14.400 ﴾28﴿					24.466
178	Kenneth Ikeda	Canada		6.100 14.033 ﴾40﴿		3.700 10.366 ﴾140﴿			24.399
179	Mikkel Soendergaard	Denmark		4.300 11.733 ﴾109			4.900 12.433 ﴾100﴿		24.166
180	Jaime Humberto Romero Moran	Mexico		5.500 12.000 ﴾122﴿				5.300 11.900 ﴾113﴿	23.9
181	Kam Wah Liu	Hong Kong	5.100 12.000 ﴾123		5.000 11.566 ﴾125﴿				23.566
182	Hristos Marinov	Bulgaria		3.800 10.100 ﴾139	5.700 13.433 ﴾69﴿				23.533
183	Mohammad Ali	Kuwait		4.400 11.866 ﴾104			3.900 11.200 ﴾126		23.066
184	Aliaksandr Tsarevich	Belarus				5.800 14.400 ﴾42﴿	2.7	7.166 ﴾134	21.566
185	Yang Liu	China			6.800 15.866 ﴾1﴿				15.866
185	Vasileios Tsolakidis	Greece				6.800 15.866 ﴾1﴿			15.866
187	Arthur Nabarrete Zanetti	Brazil			6.900 15.733 ﴾2﴿				15.733
188	Hao You	China				6.900 15.666 ﴾4﴿			15.666
189	Alberto Busnari	Italy		7.100 15.633 ﴾1﴿					15.633
190	Aleksandr Balandin	Russia			6.600 15.600 ﴾4﴿				15.6
191	Samir Aït Saïd	France			6.800 15.566 ﴾6﴿				15.566
191	Danny Pinheiro Rodrigues	France			6.900 15.566 ﴾7﴿				15.566
191	Lambertus van Gelder	Netherlands			6.600 15.566 ﴾5﴿				15.566
194	Hongtao Zhang	China		6.400 15.541 ﴾3﴿					15.541
195	Robert Seligman	Croatia		6.400 15.500 ﴾4﴿					15.5
195	Matvei Petrov	Russia		6.700 15.500 ﴾5﴿					15.5
197	Eleftherios Petrounias	Greece			6.900 15.466 ﴾9﴿				15.466
198	Prashanth Sellathurai	Australia		6.600 15.416 ﴾6﴿					15.416
199	Matteo Morandi	Italy			6.700 15.400 ﴾10﴿				15.4
199	Kohei Kameyama	Japan		6.600 15.400 ﴾8﴿					15.4
201	Federico Molinari	Argentina			6.700 15.366 ﴾11﴿				15.366
201	Mitja Petkovšek	Slovenia					6.500 15.366 ﴾13﴿		15.366
203	Harutyum Merdinyan	Armenia		6.800 15.333 ﴾9﴿					15.333
204	Dennis Goossens	Belgium			6.600 15.191 ﴾12﴿				15.191
205	Hak Seon Yang	South Korea				6.000 15.166 ﴾7﴿			15.166
206	Ashley Watson	United Kingdom					6.700 15.133 ﴾19﴿		15.133
207	Hamilton Sabot	France					6.700 15.100 ﴾20﴿		15.1
207	Tommy Ramos	Puerto Rico			6.700 15.100 ﴾14﴿				15.1
209	Sašo Bertoncelj	Slovenia		6.400 15.066 ﴾11﴿					15.066
210	Zoltán Kállai	Hungary		6.500 15.000 ﴾12﴿					15
211	Andrii Sienichkin	Ukraine		6.500 14.966 ﴾14﴿					14.966
212	Donna-Donny Truyens	Belgium		6.300 14.866 ﴾15﴿					14.866
213	Tomislav Markovic	Croatia	6.300 14.833 ﴾21﴿						14.833
213	Tomi Tuuha	Finland				5.600 14.833 ﴾22﴿			14.833
215	Marijo Možnik	Croatia						6.700 14.766 ﴾15﴿	14.766
215	Sakari Vekki	Finland	6.400 14.766 ﴾24﴿						14.766
217	Michael Meier	Switzerland				5.600 14.700 ﴾31﴿			14.7
218	Viktor Kocherin	Kazakhstan				5.600 14.600 ﴾33﴿			14.6
219	Markku Vahtila	Finland			6.400 14.575 ﴾28﴿				14.575
220	Krisztián Berki	Hungary		6.800 14.533 ﴾24﴿					14.533
221	Vahagn Stepanyan	Armenia		6.400 14.500 ﴾25﴿					14.5
221	Anderson Loran	Canada						6.900 14.500 ﴾26﴿	14.5
221	Ali Ramadan Abuoelkassem Zahran	Egypt			6.500 14.500 ﴾31﴿				14.5
224	Ümit Şamiloğlu	Turkey						7.000 14.466 ﴾28﴿	14.466
225	Andrej Korosteljev	Croatia	6.200 14.400 ﴾39﴿						14.4
225	Sam Oldham	United Kingdom	6.600 14.400 ﴾38﴿						14.4
227	Vlasios Maras	Greece						6.500 14.366 ﴾31﴿	14.366
228	Kristof Schroe	Belgium						6.500 14.333 ﴾32﴿	14.333
229	Dimitrios Markousis	Greece	6.000 14.300 ﴾41﴿						14.3
230	Marek Lyszczarz	Poland				6.000 14.225 ﴾56﴿			14.225
231	Cyril Tommasone	France		6.700 14.100 ﴾38﴿					14.1
231	Claudio Capelli	Switzerland	6.400 14.100 ﴾49﴿						14.1
233	Daniel Keatings	United Kingdom		6.400 14.033 ﴾42﴿					14.033
234	Filip Ude	Croatia		5.800 13.766 ﴾51﴿					13.766
234	Irodotos Georgallas	Cyprus			6.300 13.766 ﴾58﴿				13.766
236	Jindrich Pansky	Czech Republic	5.700 13.733 ﴾66﴿						13.733
236	Nikolai Kuksenkov	Russia						6.700 13.733 ﴾47﴿	13.733
238	Andrey Medvedev	Israel				5.600 13.700 ﴾76﴿			13.7
239	Kazuhito Tanaka	Japan					6.300 13.600 ﴾75﴿		13.6
240	Juho Kanerva	Finland		5.700 13.500 ﴾56﴿					13.5
240	Hadi Khenarinezhad	Iran	5.400 13.500 ﴾75﴿						13.5
242	Suriyen Chanduang	Thailand			5.600 13.433 ﴾68﴿				13.433
243	Stanislav Valiyev	Kazakhstan				5.600 13.333 ﴾97﴿			13.333
244	Maxim Petrishko	Kazakhstan		5.600 13.266 ﴾66﴿					13.266
245	Glenn Smink	Netherlands		5.900 13.166 ﴾69﴿					13.166
246	Nikolaos Iliopoulos	Greece					6.000 13.133 ﴾85﴿		13.133
246	Ovidiu Buidoso	Romania		6.000 13.133 ﴾70﴿					13.133
248	Renato Prpic	Croatia		6.000 12.966 ﴾74﴿					12.966
249	Fabian Leimlehner	Austria						5.700 12.933 ﴾75﴿	12.933
250	Rok Klavora	Slovenia	6.100 12.866 ﴾95﴿						12.866
251	Azizbek Kudratullayev	Kazakhstan				5.800 12.700 ﴾101			12.7
252	Tuan Dat Nguyen	Vietnam	6.200 12.633 ﴾108						12.633
253	Pericles Fouro da Silva	Brazil		6.200 12.600 ﴾84﴿					12.6
254	Christian Bruno Decidet	Chile						5.500 12.533 ﴾94﴿	12.533
255	Wajdi Bouallègue	Tunisia	5.400 12.466 ﴾113						12.466
256	Mikheil Kharabadze	Georgia		5.200 11.666 ﴾112					11.666
257	Ahmad Alqattan	Kuwait		4.900 11.616 ﴾114					11.616
258	Fahad Alghannam	Kuwait						3.700 10.433 ﴾132	10.433
259	Jawad Alherz	Kuwait			8.666 ﴾145				8.666

Men's qualifications details for the remaining individual apparatus finals can be referenced on the website of USA Gymnastics.

== Medal table ==
Rank	Nation	Gold	Silver	Bronze	Total
1	Japan	4	1	2	7
2	United States	3	6	3	12
3	China	2	0	0	2
4	Russia	1	1	2	4
5	Brazil	1	0	0	1
5	Netherlands	1	0	0	1
5	South Korea	1	0	0	1
8	Germany	0	1	1	2
8	Great Britain	0	1	1	2
10	Italy	0	1	0	1
10	Mexico	0	1	0	1
12	North Korea	0	0	1	1
12	Romania	0	0	1	1
Totals (13 entries)		13	12	11	36

=== Men ===
Rank	Nation	Gold	Silver	Bronze	Total
1	Japan	4	1	2	7
2	Brazil	1	0	0	1
2	China	1	0	0	1
2	Netherlands	1	0	0	1
2	South Korea	1	0	0	1
6	United States	0	2	2	4
7	Germany	0	1	1	2
7	Great Britain	0	1	1	2
9	Mexico	0	1	0	1
9	Russia	0	1	0	1
Totals (10 entries)		8	7	6	21

=== Women ===
Rank	Nation	Gold	Silver	Bronze	Total
1	United States	3	4	1	8
2	Russia	1	0	2	3
3	China	1	0	0	1
4	Italy	0	1	0	1
5	North Korea	0	0	1	1
5	Romania	0	0	1	1
Totals (6 entries)		5	5	5	15
