= 2013 FIG Artistic Gymnastics World Cup series =

International gymnastics competition series

FIG Artistic Gymnastics World Cup series
- Location: various — see locations
- Date: March 2 – December 7, 2013 see schedule

The 2013 FIG Artistic Gymnastics World Cup series consists of 10 events in total.

== Formats ==
=== World Cups ===
Date	Event	Location	Type
March 2	American Cup	Worcester, Massachusetts, United States	C II – All Around
March 16–17	Internationaux de France	La Roche-sur-Yon, France	C III – Apparatus
April 6–7	World Cup	Tokyo, Japan	C II – All Around
November 30 – December 1	EnBW Turn WeltCup	Stuttgart, Germany	C II – All Around
December 7	Grand Prix	Glasgow, United Kingdom	C II – All Around

=== World Challenge Cups ===
Date	Event	Location	Type	Ref.
March 21–24	Turnier der Meister	Cottbus, Germany	C III – Apparatus	
March 27–29	Challenge Cup	Doha, Qatar	C III – Apparatus	
April 26–28	World Challenge Cup	Ljubljana, Slovenia	C III – Apparatus	
June 21–23	Grand Prix	Anadia, Portugal	C III – Apparatus	
September 13–15	Grand Prix	Osijek, Croatia	C III – Apparatus	

== Medal winners ==
=== Individual all-around ===
==== Men ====
Competitions	Gold	Silver	Bronze
Worcester	(United States) Jacob Dalton	(Ukraine) Oleg Verniaiev	(Germany) Marcel Nguyen
Tokyo	(Ukraine) Oleg Verniaiev	(Japan) Ryohei Kato	(United Kingdom) Daniel Purvis
Stuttgart	(Ukraine) Oleg Verniaiev	(Germany) Fabian Hambüchen	(United Kingdom) Daniel Purvis
Glasgow	(Ukraine) Oleg Verniaiev	(United Kingdom) Daniel Purvis	(Belarus) Andrey Likhovitsky

==== Women ====
Competitions	Gold	Silver	Bronze
Worcester	(United States) Katelyn Ohashi	(United States) Simone Biles	(Canada) Victoria Moors
Tokyo	(Japan) Asuka Teramoto	(United States) Peyton Ernst	(Canada) Elsabeth Black
Stuttgart	(United States) Elizabeth Price	(Romania) Larisa Iordache	(Italy) Vanessa Ferrari
Glasgow	(Romania) Larisa Iordache	(United States) Elizabeth Price	(Italy) Vanessa Ferrari

=== Men's Apparatus ===
==== Floor ====
Competitions	Gold	Silver	Bronze
World Cups
La Roche-sur-Yon	(Romania) Flavius Koczi	(Russia) Denis Ablyazin	(United States) Jacob Dalton
World Challenge Cups
Cottbus	(Germany) Matthias Fahrig	(Greece) Eleftherios Kosmidis	(Israel) Alexander Shatilov
Doha	(Romania) Flavius Koczi	(Brazil) Arthur Oyakawa	(Slovenia) Rok Klavora
Ljubljana	(Greece) Eleftherios Kosmidis	(United States) Alexander Naddour	(Canada) Scott Morgan
Anadia	(Brazil) Diego Hypólito	(Germany) Matthias Fahrig	(United States) Samuel Mikulak

==== Pommel horse ====
Competitions	Gold	Silver	Bronze
World Cups
La Roche-sur-Yon	(Hungary) Krisztián Berki	(United Kingdom) Max Whitlock	(Croatia) Robert Seligman
World Challenge Cups
Cottbus	(Belgium) Donna-Donny Truyens	(Slovenia) Sašo Bertoncelj	(China) Zhang Yang
Doha	(Hungary) Krisztián Berki	(Japan) Jumpei Oka	(Hungary) Vid Hidvégi
Ljubljana	(Slovenia) Sašo Bertoncelj	(Hungary) Zoltán Kállai	(United States) Alexander Naddour
Anadia	(Colombia) Jhonny Muñoz	(United Kingdom) Max Whitlock	(Portugal) Gustavo Simões (Uzbekistan) Eduard Shaulov

==== Rings ====
Competitions	Gold	Silver	Bronze
World Cups
La Roche-sur-Yon	(Russia) Denis Ablyazin (Greece) Eleftherios Petrounias	—N/a	(Argentina) Federico Molinari
World Challenge Cups
Cottbus	(Greece) Eleftherios Petrounias	(China) Liu Yang	(Netherlands) Yuri van Gelder
Doha	(Brazil) Arthur Zanetti	(China) Liao Qiuhua	(Armenia) Artur Tovmasyan
Ljubljana	(Greece) Eleftherios Petrounias	(Finland) Markku Vahtila	(United States) Alexander Naddour
Anadia	(Brazil) Arthur Zanetti	(China) Yan Mingyong	(Argentina) Federico Molinari

==== Vault ====
Competitions	Gold	Silver	Bronze
World Cups
La Roche-sur-Yon	(South Korea) Yang Hak-Seon	(Vietnam) Nguyễn Hà Thanh	(Poland) Marek Lyszczarz
World Challenge Cups
Cottbus	(United States) Jacob Dalton	(Russia) Mikhail Kudashov	(Brazil) Caio Souza
Doha	(North Korea) Ri Se-Gwang	(Vietnam) Le Thanh Phuong	(Armenia) Artur Davtyan
Ljubljana	(United States) Paul Ruggeri	(Poland) Marek Lyszczarz	(Finland) Tomi Tuuha
Anadia	(Chile) Tomás González	(Ukraine) Igor Radivilov	(Brazil) Diego Hypólito

==== Parallel bars ====
Competitions	Gold	Silver	Bronze
World Cups
La Roche-sur-Yon	(Japan) Ryohei Kato	(Ukraine) Oleg Verniaiev	(Greece) Vassílios Tsolakídis
World Challenge Cups
Cottbus	(Vietnam) Nguyễn Hà Thanh	(Greece) Vasileios Tsolakidis	(Switzerland) Lucas Fischer
Doha	(Romania) Andrei Vasile Muntean	(North Korea) Kim Jin-Hyok	(China) Liao Qiuhua
Ljubljana	(Vietnam) Phạm Phước Hưng	(Slovakia) Samuel Piasecký	(Slovenia) Alen Dimic
Anadia	(Uzbekistan) Anton Fokin	(Colombia) Jossimar Calvo	(Slovakia) Samuel Piasecký

==== Horizontal bar ====
Competitions	Gold	Silver	Bronze
World Cups
La Roche-sur-Yon	(United States) Danell Leyva	(United States) Jacob Dalton	(Croatia) Marijo Možnik
World Challenge Cups
Cottbus	(Germany) Andreas Bretschneider	(Japan) Koji Uematsu	(Israel) Alexander Shatilov
Doha	(Croatia) Marijo Možnik	(Netherlands) Jeffrey Wammes	(Switzerland) Oliver Hegi
Ljubljana	(United States) Paul Ruggeri (Colombia) Jossimar Calvo	—N/a	(Croatia) Marijo Možnik
Anadia	(United States) Samuel Mikulak	(Puerto Rico) Angel Ramos	(Russia) Igor Pakhomenko

=== Women's Apparatus ===
==== Vault ====
Competitions	Gold	Silver	Bronze
World Cups
La Roche-sur-Yon	(Switzerland) Giulia Steingruber	(Canada) Maegan Chant	(Uzbekistan) Oksana Chusovitina
World Challenge Cups
Cottbus	(Uzbekistan) Oksana Chusovitina	(Netherlands) Noël van Klaveren	(Canada) Maegan Chant
Doha	(Vietnam) Phan Thị Hà Thanh	(Romania) Larisa Iordache	(Switzerland) Giulia Steingruber
Ljubljana	(Canada) Ellie Black	(South Africa) Kirsten Beckett	(Vietnam) Phan Thị Hà Thanh
Anadia	(Brazil) Jade Barbosa	(Uzbekistan) Oksana Chusovitina	(Brazil) Adrian Gomes
Osijek	(Netherlands) Noël van Klaveren	(Netherlands) Chantysha Netteb	(Vietnam) Phan Thị Hà Thanh

==== Uneven Bars ====
Competitions	Gold	Silver	Bronze
World Cups
La Roche-sur-Yon	(Switzerland) Giulia Steingruber	(Canada) Kaitlyn Hofland	(Czech Republic) Jana Šikulová
World Challenge Cups
Cottbus	(Russia) Anastasia Grishina	(Venezuela) Jessica López	(Spain) María Paula Vargas
Doha	(China) Tan Jiaxin	(United Kingdom) Ruby Harrold	(United Kingdom) Gabrielle Jupp
Ljubljana	(Czech Republic) Kristýna Pálešová	(Hungary) Noémi Makra	(Czech Republic) Jana Šikulová
Anadia	(Russia) Anastasia Grishina	(Germany) Lisa-Katharina Hill	(China) Shang Chunsong
Osijek	(Russia) Ekaterina Kramarenko	(Czech Republic) Kristýna Pálešová	(Venezuela) Jessica López

==== Balance Beam ====
Competitions	Gold	Silver	Bronze
World Cups
La Roche-sur-Yon	(Italy) Carlotta Ferlito	(Italy) Vanessa Ferrari	(Greece) Vasiliki Millousi
World Challenge Cups
Cottbus	(Russia) Anastasia Grishina	(Greece) Vasiliki Millousi	(Russia) Anna Dementyeva
Doha	(Romania) Larisa Iordache	(China) Zeng Siqi	(United Kingdom) Gabrielle Jupp
Ljubljana	(Canada) Ellie Black	(Hungary) Noémi Makra	(Austria) Lisa Ecker
Anadia	(Romania) Larisa Iordache	(China) Shang Chunsong	(Romania) Diana Bulimar
Osijek	(Netherlands) Sanne Wevers	(Venezuela) Jessica López	(Ukraine) Krystyna Sankova

==== Floor Exercise ====
Competitions	Gold	Silver	Bronze
World Cups
La Roche-sur-Yon	(Russia) Ksenia Afanasyeva	(Romania) Diana Bulimar	(Italy) Carlotta Ferlito
World Challenge Cups
Cottbus	(Canada) Maegan Chant	(Russia) Anna Dementyeva	(Netherlands) Noël van Klaveren
Doha	(Romania) Diana Bulimar	(Romania) Larisa Iordache	(China) Zeng Siqi
Ljubljana	(Canada) Ellie Black (Hungary) Noémi Makra	—N/a	(Portugal) Ana Filipa Martins
Anadia	(Romania) Larisa Iordache (Romania) Diana Bulimar	—N/a	(China) Shang Chunsong
Osijek	(Venezuela) Jessica López	(Ukraine) Krystyna Sankova	(Ukraine) Angelina Kysla

== See also ==
- 2013 FIG Rhythmic Gymnastics World Cup series
