= Sam Hunter =

Sam Hunter may refer to:

== People ==
- Sam Hunter (art historian) (1923–2014), American historian of modern art
- Sam Hunter (cartoonist) (1858–1939), Canadian cartoonist
- Samuel Hunter (gymnast) (born 1988), British male artistic gymnast
- Samuel D. Hunter (playwright) (born 1981), American playwright

== Fictional ==
- Sam Hunter (TV series), an American television drama series
- Sam Hunter (EastEnders), a fictional character
- Sam Hunter, a character in Hunted and Sam Hunter

== See also ==
- Samuel Hunter (disambiguation)
