= Sašo Bertoncelj =

Slovenian artistic gymnast (born 1984)

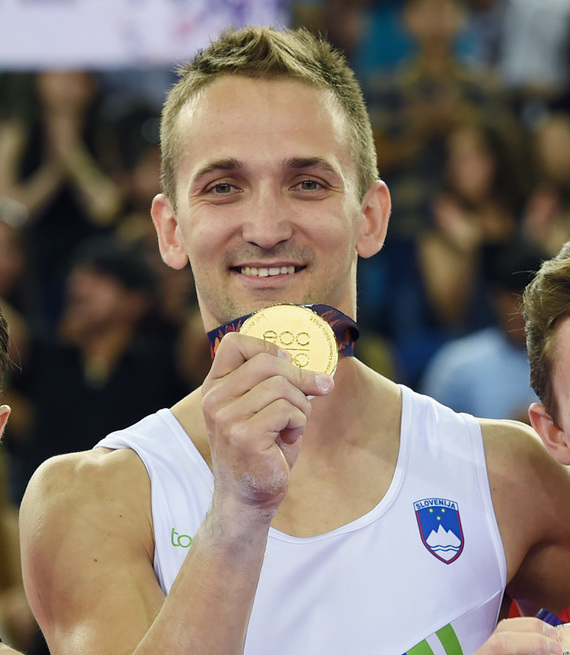
- Bertoncelj at the 2015 European Games

Personal information
- Born: 16 July 1984 (age 42) Kranj, SR Slovenia, Yugoslavia
- Height: 1.80 m (5 ft 11 in)

Gymnastics career
- Discipline: Men's artistic gymnastics
- Country represented: Slovenia
- Club: SD Narodni Dom
- Head coach: Sebastijan Piletič
Medal record
Men's artistic gymnastics
Representing Slovenia
European Games
Gold medal – first place	2015 Baku	Pommel horse
European Championships
Silver medal – second place	2018 Glasgow	Pommel horse
Bronze medal – third place	2014 Sofia	Pommel horse
Bronze medal – third place	2010 Birmingham	Pommel horse
World University Games
Gold medal – first place	2007 Bangkok	Pommel horse
Bronze medal – third place	2009 Belgrade	Pommel horse
Mediterranean Games
Gold medal – first place	2013 Mersin	Pommel horse
FIG World Cup
Event	1st	2nd	3rd
Apparatus World Cup	3	2	4
World Challenge Cup	6	6	11
Total	9	8	15

Sašo Bertoncelj (Slovene pronunciation: [ˈsáːʃɔ bɛrˈtóːnt͡sɛl]; born 16 July 1984) is a Slovenian former artistic gymnast. He was primarily a pommel horse specialist and is the 2015 European Games champion on that apparatus. He is also a three-time European Championships medalist on the pommel horse.

== Gymnastics career ==
Bertoncelj began gymnastics when he was seven years old and was coached by Sebastijan Piletič for his entire career. He competed on the pommel horse at the 2005 World Championships but did not advance to the finals. He won the pommel horse title at the 2007 Summer Universiade. He qualified for the pommel horse final at the 2009 European Championships and finished eighth after falling. Then at the 2009 Summer Universiade, he won the pommel horse bronze medal behind Krisztián Berki and Donna-Donny Truyens. He finished 12th on the pommel horse in the qualification round of the 2009 World Championships.

Bertoncelj won his first European Championships medal in 2010 when he won the pommel horse bronze medal behind British gymnasts Dan Keatings and Louis Smith. He qualified for the pommel horse final at the 2010 World Championships but fell and finished eighth. He also fell in the pommel horse final at the 2011 World Championships and finished seventh. He won the pommel horse title at the 2012 Osijek World Challenge Cup. He won the pommel horse silver medal at the 2013 Cottbus World Challenge Cup. He then won the gold medal at the Ljubljana World Challenge Cup. At the 2013 European Championships, he finished seventh in the pommel horse final. He then won the pommel horse title at the 2013 Mediterranean Games. He was the third reserve for the pommel horse final at the 2013 World Championships.

Bertoncelj won the pommel horse bronze medal at the 2014 Doha World Challenge Cup. He then won the bronze medal at the 2014 European Championships behind Max Whitlock and Krisztián Berki. At the 2014 World Championships, he qualified for the pommel horse final and finished fourth, missing out on a medal by 0.067 points. Bertoncelj represented Slovenia at the 2015 European Games and won the gold medal in the pommel horse final. He was dealing with an elbow injury in the lead-up to the 2015 World Championships and lowered the difficulty of his routine. He fell off the pommel horse in the qualification round and failed to advance to the final, which also ended his chances of qualifying for the 2016 Summer Olympics.

Bertoncelj won the pommel horse silver medal at the 2016 Ljubljana World Challenge Cup. He advanced to the pommel horse final at the 2016 European Championships and finished seventh. He won the pommel horse title at the 2017 Koper World Challenge Cup. He then placed sixth in the 2017 European Championships final. At the 2017 Paris World Challenge Cup, he won the bronze medal. He finished eighth at the 2017 World Championships after falling in the beginning of his routine.

Bertoncelj competed at the 2018 Mediterranean Games and finished fifth in the pommel horse final and eighth with the Slovenian team. Then at the 2018 European Championships, he tied with Croatia's Robert Seligman for the silver medal on the pommel horse. He then won the bronze medal at the Koper World Challenge Cup. He then won the silver medal at the Szombathely World Challenge Cup behind Oleg Verniaiev, and he won the bronze medal at the Paris World Challenge Cup.

Bertoncelj missed most of the 2019 season due to an elbow injury. He returned in September to win the pommel horse gold medal at the 2019 Mersin World Challenge Cup. He then won the bronze medal at the Szombathely World Challenge Cup. Bertoncelj injured his shoulder at the 2020 European Championships. He returned to competition in 2021 and competed at the 2021 World Championships. He finished 15th in the pommel horse during the qualification round and did not advance to the final. He announced his retirement from the sport in 2021.

== Eponymous skill ==
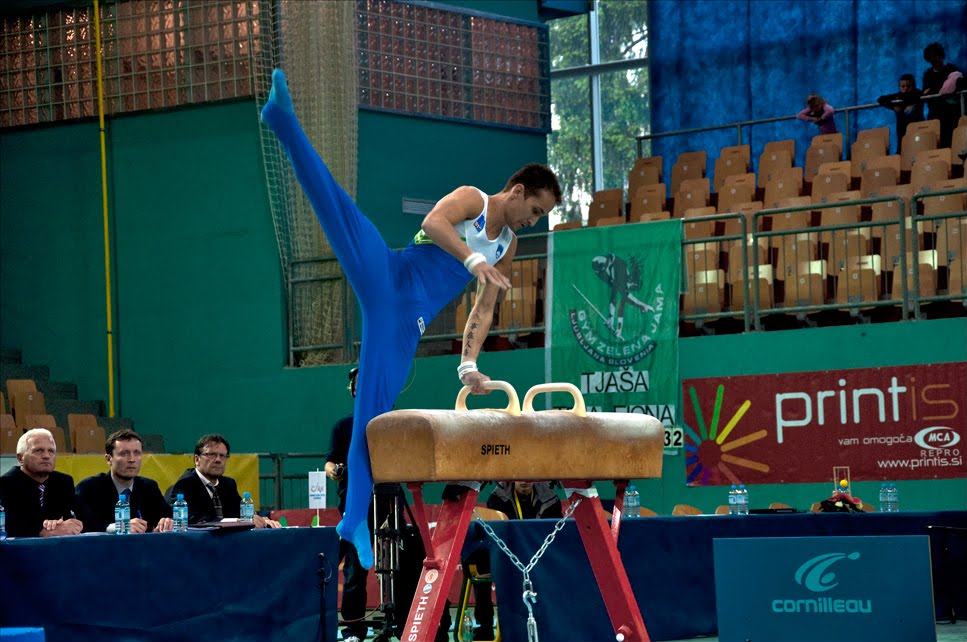
Bertoncelj competing in 2010

Since 2018, Bertoncelj has a pommel horse skill named after him in the Code of Points. He became the fourth Slovenian gymnast to have an eponymous skill.

Apparatus	Name	Description	Difficulty (Note: Valid for the 2025–2028 Code of Points.)
Pommel horse	Bertoncelj	Kehr with 270° turn on 1 pommel (Sohn technique) from side to cross support	C (0.3)

== Personal life ==
In 2022, Bertoncelj won the election for President of the Mediterranean Games Athletes Commission for a four-year term. He has also been involved with the International Gymnastics Federation (FIG) Athletes' Commission. He competed on the 2017 season of MasterChef Slovenia and finished ninth. Bertoncelj lives in Škofja Loka with his wife and two sons.
