= Samuel Hunter =

Samuel Hunter may refer to:

- Samuel Hunter (cyclist) (1894–1976), British cyclist
- Samuel Hunter (editor) (1769–1839), Scottish newspaper proprietor
- Samuel Hunter (gymnast) (born 1988), British artistic gymnast
- Samuel D. Hunter (born 1981), American playwright
- Samuel Black Hunter (1855–1935), Canadian politician

== See also ==
- Sam Hunter (disambiguation)
