= 2010 European Artistic Gymnastics Championships =

2010 European Artistic Gymnastics Championships may refer to:

- 2010 European Men's Artistic Gymnastics Championships
- 2010 European Women's Artistic Gymnastics Championships
