= Jaime Romero Móran =

Mexican artistic gymnast (1993–2015)

Jaime Humberto Romero Moran
- Full name: Jaime Humberto Romero Moran
- Born: 2 April 1993
- Died: 5 January 2015 (aged 21) Guadalajara

Gymnastics career
- Discipline: Men's artistic gymnastics
- Country represented: Mexico (2013–2014)

Jaime Humberto Romero Moran (2 April 1993 – 3 January 2015 in Guadalajara) was a Mexican male artistic gymnast, representing his nation at international competitions. He competed at the 2013 World Artistic Gymnastics Championships in Antwerp, Belgium.

In January 2015 he was shot dead. Romero Morán and a friend, Raul Trejo Santos, 23, were having a discussion outside Lienzo Charro Zermeño in Guadalajara, Jalisco, when they were attacked by a group of armed men, who fled after killing the two.
