= Oliver Hegi =

Swiss artistic gymnast

- Full name: Oliver Nicola Hegi
- Born: 20 February 1993 (age 33) Villmergen, Aargau, Switzerland
- Height: 1.69 m (5 ft 7 in)

Gymnastics career
- Discipline: Men's artistic gymnastics
- Country represented: Switzerland (2015–2021)
- Club: TV Lenzburg
- Head coach: Bernhard Fluck
Medal record
Representing Switzerland
European Championships
Gold medal – first place	2018 Glasgow	Horizontal bar
Silver medal – second place	2017 Cluj-Napoca	Horizontal bar
Bronze medal – third place	2016 Bern	Team
Bronze medal – third place	2018 Glasgow	Parallel bars
FIG World Cup
Event	1st	2nd	3rd
World Cup	0	0	1
World Challenge Cup	0	0	3
Total	0	0	4

Oliver Nicola Hegi (born 20 February 1993) is a Swiss former artistic gymnast. He is the 2018 European champion on the horizontal bar, and he represented Switzerland at the 2016 Summer Olympics.

== Gymnastics career ==
Hegi began artistic gymnastics when he was seven years old, following his older brother into the sport.

=== Junior ===
Hegi competed alongside Pablo Brägger and Michael Meier at the 2009 European Youth Olympic Festival, and they won the team silver medal behind Russia. Individually, he won bronze medals on the parallel bars and the horizontal bar. At the 2010 Junior European Championships, he won silver medals on the pommel horse, parallel bars, and horizontal bar.

Hegi represented Switzerland at the 2010 Summer Youth Olympics and was the flag bearer for the opening ceremonies. He finished 19th in the all-around qualifications, making him the first reserve for the final.

=== Senior ===
Hegi competed with the Swiss team that finished seventh at the 2012 European Championships. At the 2013 Doha World Challenge Cup, he won the horizontal bar bronze medal, behind Marijo Možnik and Jeffrey Wammes. He finished ninth in the all-around qualifications at the 2013 World Championships. However, during the final, he fell off the horizontal bar and had to end his routine early due to a ripped grip. As a result, he finished 23rd.

Hegi won a bronze medal on the horizontal bar at the 2014 Cottbus World Cup. At the 2014 European Championships, he finished fourth in the horizontal bar final, only 0.008 points behind the bronze medalist. He then helped the Swiss team finish seventh in the team final at the 2014 World Championships. He also advanced into the all-around final, where he finished 18th. He missed the 2015 European Championships due to a shoulder injury. At the 2015 World Championships, he helped the Swiss team finish sixth in the team final at the 2015 World Championships and win an Olympic berth. He also advanced into the horizontal bar final and placed seventh.

Hegi placed sixth in the all-around at the 2016 Stuttgart World Cup. At the 2016 Osijek World Challenge Cup, he tied with Tin Srbić for the horizontal bar bronze medal. Then at the 2016 European Championships, he helped the Swiss team win the bronze medal. He was selected to represent Switzerland at the 2016 Summer Olympics where the team finished ninth in the qualification round for the 2016 Summer Olympics, making them the first reserve for the final.

Hegi placed eighth in the all-around at the 2017 Stuttgart World Cup. Then at the 2017 European Championships, he won the silver medal on the horizontal bar, behind teammate Pablo Brägger. He advanced to the horizontal bar final at the 2017 World Championships but fell and finished eighth. At the 2018 European Championships, he became the European horizontal bar champion and also won a bronze medal on the parallel bars. Then at the 2018 World Championships, he finished sixth with the Swiss team and 16th in the all-around final.

Hegi won a bronze medal on the horizontal bar at the 2019 Baku World Cup. At the 2019 World Championships, he helped Switzerland advance into the team final and earn a team berth to the 2020 Summer Olympics. The team ultimately finished seventh. He also advanced into the all-around final, but he finished 23rd after multiple mistakes. He was the first reserve for the horizontal bar final after finishing ninth in the qualifications.

Hegi announced his retirement from the sport on 1 March 2021.
