= 2010 European Men's Artistic Gymnastics Championships =

29th European Men's Artistic Gymnastics Championships
- Venue: National Indoor Arena
- Location: Birmingham, England
- Dates: 21 to 25 April 2010
- Nations: Members of the European Union of Gymnastics

The 29th European Men's Artistic Gymnastics Championships was held from 21 to 25 April 2010 at the National Indoor Arena in Birmingham. The senior and junior events are different. During the senior's qualification the top eight teams progress to the team final, and the top eight gymnasts (two per nation maximum) on each apparatus qualify for the individual finals. After the qualification for the juniors the team medals and places are awarded. Unlike the seniors in this event the top 24 gymnasts (two per nation maximum) compete in the all around final.

Oldest and youngest competitors

Senior	Name	Country	Date of birth	Age
Youngest	Matija Baron	Croatia	08/09/91	18 years
Oldest	Espen Jansen	Norway	13/12/68	41 years

Junior	Name	Country	Date of birth	Age
Youngest	Ahmet Onder	Turkey	12/07/96	13 years
Oldest	Ioan Nistor	Romania	12/01/92	18 years

== Timetable ==
Date	Time	Event
19 & 20 April		Podium Training
22 April	10.00 to 21.45 hrs	Junior Qualification
23 April	10.00 to 20.30 hrs	Senior Qualification
24 April	11:00 to 13:00 hrs	Juniors All-Around Final
24 April	14.00 to 17:00 hrs	Senior Team Final
25 April	9.30 to 12.10 hrs	Junior Apparatus final
25 April	13.45 to 16.45 hrs	Senior Apparatus final

== Medal winners ==
Event	Gold	Silver	Bronze
Seniors
Team	Germany	Great Britain	France
Floor	Matthias Fahrig (GER)	Eleftherios Kosmidis (GRE)	Daniel Purvis (GBR); Marcel Nguyen (GER)
Pommel horse	Daniel Keatings (GBR)	Louis Smith (GBR)	Sašo Bertoncelj (SLO)
Rings	Matteo Morandi (ITA)	Samir Aït Saïd (FRA)	Yordan Yovchev (BUL)
Vault	Tomi Tuuha (FIN)	Matthias Fahrig (GER)	Flavius Koczi (ROU)
Parallel bars	Yann Cucherat (FRA)	Vasileios Tsolakidis (GRE)	Adam Kierzkowski (POL); Hamilton Sabot (FRA)
Horizontal bar	Vlasios Maras (GRE)	Epke Zonderland (NED)	Philipp Boy (GER); Fabian Hambüchen (GER)
Juniors
All round	Sam Oldham (GBR)	Max Whitlock (GBR)	Pablo Braegger (SUI)
Floor	Max Whitlock (GBR)	Siemon Volkaert (BEL); Adelin Ladislau Kotrong (ROU)	
Pommel horse	Max Whitlock (GBR)	Oliver Hegi (SUI)	Daniel Weinert (GER); Artur Davtyan (ARM)
Rings	Néstor Abad (ESP)	Stephen Micholet (FRA)	Reiss Beckford (GBR)
Vault	Artur Davtyan (ARM)	Fabián González (ESP)	Marco Lodadio (ITA)
Parallel bars	Andrei Vasile Muntean (ROU)	Oliver Hegi (SUI)	Eddy Yusof (SUI)
Horizontal bar	Sam Oldham (GBR)	Oliver Hegi (SUI)	Fabián González (ESP); Reiss Beckford (GBR)

== Detail results ==
=== Seniors ===
==== Team ====
Oldest and youngest competitors

Senior	Name	Country	Date of birth	Age
Youngest	Eleftherios Kosmidis	Greece	06/05/91	18 years
Oldest	Alberto Busnari	Italy	04/10/78	31 years

Rank	Team	Floor (gymnastics)	Pommel horse	Rings (gymnastics)	Vault (gymnastics)	Parallel bars	Horizontal bar	Total
1st place, gold medalist(s)	Germany	44.625	41.200	43.475	47.525	44.150	45.175	266.150
1st place, gold medalist(s)	Philipp Boy	-	14.325	14.475	-	-	15.375	266.150
1st place, gold medalist(s)	Matthias Fahrig	15.125	12.650	-	16.175	-	-	266.150
1st place, gold medalist(s)	Fabian Hambüchen	14.600	-	14.400	15.675	14.775	15.175	266.150
1st place, gold medalist(s)	Marcel Nguyen	14.900	-	14.600	15.675	14.975	14.625	266.150
1st place, gold medalist(s)	Evgenij Spiridonov	-	14.225	-	-	14.400	-	266.150
2nd place, silver medalist(s)	Great Britain	44.450	43.825	42.550	46.875	42.425	42.900	263.025
2nd place, silver medalist(s)	Daniel Keatings	-	13.700	-	15.600	13.400	14.125	263.025
2nd place, silver medalist(s)	Louis Smith	-	15.525	-	-	-	-	263.025
2nd place, silver medalist(s)	Samuel Hunter	14.575	14.600	14.275	15.700	14.325	14.575	263.025
2nd place, silver medalist(s)	Daniel Purvis	14.950	-	14.100	15.575	14.700	-	263.025
2nd place, silver medalist(s)	Kristian Thomas	14.925	-	14.175	-	-	14.200	263.025
3rd place, bronze medalist(s)	France	42.525	44.525	42.675	47.025	41.975	41.375	260.100
3rd place, bronze medalist(s)	Hamilton Sabot	14.125	14.575	14.275	-	13.450	14.500	260.100
3rd place, bronze medalist(s)	Cyril Tommasone	14.100	15.525	13.275	15.425	13.225	13.075	260.100
3rd place, bronze medalist(s)	Samir Aït Saïd	14.300	-	15.125	16.050	-	-	260.100
3rd place, bronze medalist(s)	Yannick Rayepin Moutoussamy	-	14.425	-	15.550	-	-	260.100
3rd place, bronze medalist(s)	Yann Cucherat	-	-	-	-	15.300	13.800	260.100
4	Spain	43.100	41.725	42.875	47.125	43.100	40.875	258.800
4	Rafael Martínez	14.650	14.325	-	-	14.475	14.775	258.800
4	Isaac Botella Pérez	13.775	-	-	16.000	-	-	258.800
4	Sergio Muñoz	-	13.450	14.400	15.950	-	14.125	258.800
4	Javier Gómez Fuertes	14.675	-	14.075	15.175	14.125	-	258.800
4	Manuel Carballo	-	13.950	14.400	-	14.500	11.975	258.800
5	Switzerland	42.525	40.100	42.225	46.125	43.950	42.225	257.150
5	Claudio Capelli	14.900	13.725	-	15.600	14.425	-	257.150
5	Lucas Fischer	-	-	-	-	14.950	14.700	257.150
5	Roman Gisi	13.850	12.350	13.625	15.700	-	13.575	257.150
5	Mark Ramseier	13.775	14.025	14.200	-	-	-	257.150
5	Nicolas Boeschenstein	-	-	14.400	14.825	14.575	13.950	257.150
6	Italy	41.675	42.350	43.975	45.775	40.300	40.900	254.975
6	Matteo Morandi	13.775	-	15.475	15.200	14.175	-	254.975
6	Paolo Ottavi	13.875	13.650	14.950	15.025	11.950	13.875	254.975
6	Alberto Busnari	-	14.950	-	-	14.175	13.950	254.975
6	Paolo Principi	14.025	13.750	13.550	15.550	-	13.075	254.975
6	-							254.975
7	Romania	43.675	41.400	41.475	48.175	38.500	41.450	254.675
7	Flavius Koczi	14.950	14.575	14.050	16.450	14.550	-	254.675
7	Adrian Bucur	14.350	12.625	13.550	-	-	13.700	254.675
7	Ovidiu Buidoso	-	14.200	-	15.675	12.800	13.950	254.675
7	Alin Sandu Jivan	14.375	-	13.875	16.050	-	-	254.675
7	Cosmin Cristian Iancu	-	-	-	-	11.150	13.800	254.675
8	Greece	43.500	39.850	41.450	45.075	40.750	42.600	253.225
8	Christos Lympanovnos	13.875	13.500	13.900	15.475	14.125	13.575	253.225
8	Dimitrios Markousis	14.725	12.850	13.925	14.025	11.325	13.850	253.225
8	Vlasios Maras	-	13.500	-	15.575	-	15.175	253.225
8	Eleftherios Kosmidis	14.900	-	13.625	-	-	-	253.225
8	Vasileios Tsolakidis	-	-	-	-	15.300	-	253.225

==== Floor ====
Oldest and youngest competitors

Senior	Name	Country	Date of birth	Age
Youngest	Eleftherios Kosmidis	Greece	06/05/91	18 years
Oldest	Rafael Martínez	Spain	10/12/83	26 years

Rank	Gymnast	D Score	E Score	Pen.	Total
1st place, gold medalist(s)	Matthias Fahrig (GER)	6.700	8.950		15.650
2nd place, silver medalist(s)	Eleftherios Kosmidis (GRE)	6.700	8.700		15.400
3rd place, bronze medalist(s)	Daniel Purvis (GBR)	6.400	8.850		15.250
3rd place, bronze medalist(s)	Marcel Nguyen (GER)	6.500	8.750		15.250
5	Kristian Thomas (GBR)	6.300	8.675		14.975
6	Flavius Koczi (ROU)	6.200	8.750		14.950
7	Rafael Martínez (ESP)	6.400	8.425		14.825
8	Adrian Bucur (ROU)	6.000	8.700		14.700

==== Pommel horse ====
Oldest and youngest competitors

Senior	Name	Country	Date of birth	Age
Youngest	Daniel Keatings	United Kingdom	04/01/90	20 years
Oldest	Alberto Busnari	Italy	04/10/78	31 years

Rank	Gymnast	D Score	E Score	Pen.	Total
1st place, gold medalist(s)	Daniel Keatings (GBR)	6.700	8.900		15.600
2nd place, silver medalist(s)	Louis Smith (GBR)	6.600	8.775		15.375
3rd place, bronze medalist(s)	Sašo Bertoncelj (SLO)	6.300	8.600		14.900
4	Flavius Koczi (ROU)	6.400	8.475		14.875
5	Vid Hidvégi (HUN)	6.200	8.650		14.850
6	Koen Van Damme (BEL)	6.300	8.275		14.575
7	Alberto Busnari (ITA)	5.700	8.175		13.875
8	Cyril Tommasone (FRA)	6.100	7.225		13.325

==== Rings ====
Oldest and youngest competitors

Senior	Name	Country	Date of birth	Age
Youngest	Samir Aït Saïd	France	01/11/89	20 years
Oldest	Yordan Yovchev	Bulgaria	24/02/73	37 years

Rank	Gymnast	D Score	E Score	Pen.	Total
1st place, gold medalist(s)	Matteo Morandi (ITA)	6.700	8.550		15.250
2nd place, silver medalist(s)	Samir Aït Saïd (FRA)	6.800	8.300		15.100
3rd place, bronze medalist(s)	Yordan Yovchev (BUL)	6.700	8.200		14.900
4	Vahagn Davtyan (ARM)	6.700	8.000		14.700
5	Paolo Ottavi (ITA)	6.300	8.350		14.650
6	Marcel Nguyen (GER)	6.300	8.175		14.475
7	Nicolas Boeschenstein (SUI)	5.800	8.575		14.375
8	Fabian Hambuechen (GER)	5.500	7.500		13.000

==== Vault ====
Oldest and youngest competitors

Senior	Name	Country	Date of birth	Age
Youngest	Tomi Tuuha	Finland	28/11/89	20 years
Oldest	Issac Botella Perez	Spain	12/06/84	25 years

Rank	Gymnast	D Score	E Score	Pen.	Score 1	D Score	E Score	Pen.	Score 2	Total
1st place, gold medalist(s)	Tomi Tuuha (FIN)	6.600	9.350		15.950	6.600	9.400		16.000	15.975
2nd place, silver medalist(s)	Matthias Fahrig (GER)	7.000	9.150		16.150	6.600	9.175		15.775	15.962
3rd place, bronze medalist(s)	Flavius Koczi (ROU)	6.200	9.350		15.550	7.000	9.300		16.300	15.925
4	Jeffrey Wammes (NED)	6.600	9.325		15.925	6.600	9.200		15.800	15.862
5	Marek Lyszczarz (POL)	6.600	9.325		15.925	6.200	9.475		15.675	15.800
6	Marcel Nguyen (GER)	6.600	9.300		15.900	6.600	9.000		15.600	15.750
7	Isaac Botella Pérez (ESP)	6.600	9.300		15.900	6.600	8.975		15.575	15.737
8	Yann Rayepin Moutoussamy (FRA)	7.000	8.975	0.3	15.675	6.600	8.075	0.1	14.575	15.125
Rank	Gymnast	Vault 1				Vault 2				Total

==== Parallel bars ====
Oldest and youngest competitors

Senior	Name	Country	Date of birth	Age
Youngest	Daniel Purvis	United Kingdom	13/11/90	19 years
Oldest	Vasileios Tsolakidis	Greece	09/09/79	30 years

Rank	Gymnast	D Score	E Score	Pen.	Total
1st place, gold medalist(s)	Yann Cucherat (FRA)	6.200	9.075		15.275
2nd place, silver medalist(s)	Vasileios Tsolakidis (GRE)	6.300	8.900		15.200
3rd place, bronze medalist(s)	Adam Kierzkowski (POL)	6.000	9.100		15.100
3rd place, bronze medalist(s)	Hamilton Sabot (FRA)	6.500	8.600		15.100
5	Epke Zonderland (NED)	6.100	8.975		15.075
6	Roman Kulesza (POL)	6.000	9.025		15.025
7	Manuel Carballo (ESP)	5.800	8.875		14.675
8	Daniel Purvis (GBR)	5.700	8.725		14.425

==== Horizontal bar ====
Oldest and youngest competitors

Senior	Name	Country	Date of birth	Age
Youngest	Fabian Hambüchen	Germany	25/10/87	22 years
Oldest	Aljaž Pegan	Slovenia	02/06/74	36 years

Rank	Gymnast	D Score	E Score	Pen.	Total
1st place, gold medalist(s)	Vlasios Maras (GRE)	6.900	8.500		15.400
2nd place, silver medalist(s)	Epke Zonderland (NED)	7.100	8.275		15.375
3rd place, bronze medalist(s)	Philipp Boy (GER)	6.900	8.450		15.350
3rd place, bronze medalist(s)	Fabian Hambüchen (GER)	7.000	8.350		15.350
5	Jeffrey Wammes (NED)	6.700	8.325		15.025
5	Yann Cucherat (FRA)	6.800	8.225		15.025
7	Roman Kulesza (POL)	6.400	7.825		14.225
8	Aljaž Pegan (SLO)	6.600	7.200		13.800

=== Juniors ===
==== All round ====
Oldest and youngest competitors

Junior	Name	Country	Date of birth	Age
Youngest	Daan Kenis	Belgium	28/08/94	15 years
Oldest	Tommaso De Vecchis	Italy	18/01/92	18 years

source =

Rank	Gymnast	Floor (gymnastics)	Pommel horse	Rings (gymnastics)	Vault (gymnastics)	Parallel bars	Horizontal bar	Total
1st place, gold medalist(s)	Sam Oldham (GBR)	14.450	13.500	13.525	15.600	13.675	13.825	84.575
2nd place, silver medalist(s)	Max Whitlock (GBR)	14.000	14.125	13.725	15.275	13.800	13.350	84.275
3rd place, bronze medalist(s)	Pablo Braegger (SUI)	14.125	12.500	13.500	15.625	13.800	13.600	83.150
4	Fabián González (ESP)	14.250	13.375	12.650	15.125	13.775	13.675	82.850
5	Michael Meier (SUI)	13.700	12.100	12.875	15.700	13.675	13.125	81.175
6	Thomas Neuteleers (BEL)	13.725	11.475	13.375	15.000	13.800	13.625	81.000
7	Néstor Abad (ESP)	13.975	10.725	14.050	15.600	13.400	13.150	80.900
7	Andrei Vasile Muntean (ROU)	12.575	11.825	14.075	15.650	13.650	13.125	80.900
9	Jim Zona (FRA)	13.650	11.900	13.300	15.275	13.650	13.100	80.875
10	Ludovico Edalli (ITA)	13.275	12.775	13.175	14.725	13.450	13.250	80.650
11	Mathieu Vanacker (FRA)	13.850	12.250	13.125	15.425	12.925	12.850	80.425
12	Christopher Jursch (GER)	13.350	12.775	12.600	14.575	13.550	13.550	80.400
13	Vahan Vardanyan (ARM)	13.525	12.675	13.500	14.075	12.850	12.550	79.175
14	Daan Kenis (BEL)	13.675	12.175	12.875	14.650	12.950	12.625	78.950
15	Levente Vagner (HUN)	13.600	12.000	13.050	14.075	13.575	12.525	78.825
16	Daniel Weinert (GER)	13.400	11.800	12.625	14.550	13.450	12.900	78.725
17	Daniel Radeanu (ROU)	14.325	12.300	12.975	14.075	11.925	12.975	78.575
18	Glenn Smink (NED)	13.875	12.150	12.325	14.725	12.850	12.625	78.550
19	Artur Davtyan (ARM)	13.600	12.875	13.300	12.100	13.325	12.600	77.800
20	Michel Bletterman (NED)	13.450	11.875	12.025	14.025	13.250	13.100	77.725
21	Tommaso de Vecchis (ITA)	13.475	11.325	11.900	14.475	13.050	12.675	76.900
22	Giorgos-Christos Chatziefstathiou (GRE)	13.075	11.750	10.425	13.225	13.400	12.500	74.375
23	Stian Skjerahaug (NOR)	13.150	9.600	11.825	14.200	13.100	12.450	74.325
24	Ricardo Martins (POR)	13.025	10.225	12.450	13.975	13.000	11.275	73.950

==== Floor ====
Oldest and youngest competitors

Junior	Name	Country	Date of birth	Age
Youngest	Andrei Ioan Groza	Romania	24/04/94	16 years
Oldest	Fabián González	Spain	08/05/92	17 years

Rank	Gymnast	D Score	E Score	Pen.	Total
1st place, gold medalist(s)	Max Whitlock (GBR)	5.200	8.975		14.175
2nd place, silver medalist(s)	Siemon Volkaert (BEL)	5.300	8.825		14.125
2nd place, silver medalist(s)	Adelin Kotrong (ROU)	5.400	8.725		14.125
4	Fabián González (ESP)	5.300	8.650		13.950
5	Thomas Neuteleers (BEL)	5.100	8.675		13.775
6	Ivan Rittschik (GER)	5.000	8.875	0.1	13.775
7	Sam Oldham (GBR)	5.300	8.850	0.5	13.650
8	Andrei Ioan Groza (ROU)	5.100	8.650	0.2	13.550

==== Pommel horse ====
Oldest and youngest competitors

Junior	Name	Country	Date of birth	Age
Youngest	Frank Baines	United Kingdom	16/07/95	14 years
Oldest	Artur Davtyan	Armenia	08/08/92	17 years

Rank	Gymnast	D Score	E Score	Pen.	Total
1st place, gold medalist(s)	Max Whitlock (GBR)	5.800	8.600		14.400
2nd place, silver medalist(s)	Oliver Hegi (SUI)	5.000	8.475		13.475
3rd place, bronze medalist(s)	Daniel Weinert (GER)	4.800	8.400		13.200
3rd place, bronze medalist(s)	Artur Davtyan (ARM)	4.500	8.700		13.200
5	Jimmy Verbaeys (BEL)	4.700	8.425		13.125
6	Brandon Prost (FRA)	4.800	8.175		12.975
7	Frank Baines (GBR)	4.700	7.450		12.150
8	Christopher Jursch (GER)	3.700	8.100		11.800

==== Rings ====
Oldest and youngest competitors

Junior	Name	Country	Date of birth	Age
Youngest	Stephen Micholet	France	26/05/94	15 years
Oldest	Reiss Beckford	United Kingdom	17/02/92	18 years

Rank	Gymnast	D Score	E Score	Pen.	Total
1st place, gold medalist(s)	Néstor Abad (ESP)	5.000	9.250		14.250
2nd place, silver medalist(s)	Stephen Micholet (FRA)	5.300	8.850		14.150
3rd place, bronze medalist(s)	Reiss Beckford (GBR)	5.100	9.025		14.125
4	Andrei Vasile Muntean (ROU)	5.200	8.750		13.950
5	Tallon Fernandez (ESP)	4.800	9.125		13.925
6	Max Whitlock (GBR)	4.700	9.150		13.850
7	Artur Davtyan (ARM)	4.700	9.125		13.825
8	Vahan Vardanyan (ARM)	4.600	9.150		13.750

==== Vault ====
Oldest and youngest competitors

Junior	Name	Country	Date of birth	Age
Youngest	Daniel Radeanu	Romania	29/06/94	15 years
Oldest	Tomas Thys	Belgium	06/03/92	18 years

Rank	Gymnast	D Score	E Score	Pen.	Score 1	D Score	E Score	Pen.	Score 2	Total
1st place, gold medalist(s)	Artur Davtyan (ARM)	6.200	9.250		15.450	6.200	9.275		15.475	15.462
2nd place, silver medalist(s)	Fabián González (ESP)	6.200	9.425		15.625	5.800	9.275		15.075	15.350
3rd place, bronze medalist(s)	Marco Lodadio (ITA)	6.600	9.350		15.950	5.400	9.200		14.600	15.275
4	Michael Meier (SUI)	6.200	9.125		15.325	6.200	9.000		15.200	15.262
5	Néstor Abad (ESP)	6.200	9.025		15.225	6.200	9.250	0.3	15.187	15.150
6	Daniel Radeanu (ROU)	6.200	8.625		14.825	6.200	9.125		15.325	15.075
7	Pablo Braegger (SUI)	6.200	9.125		15.325	5.800	8.875		14.675	15.000
8	Tomas Thys (BEL)	6.200	8.875	0.3	14.775	5.800	9.025		14.825	14.800
Rank	Gymnast	Vault 1				Vault 2				Total

==== Parallel bars ====
Oldest and youngest competitors

Junior	Name	Country	Date of birth	Age
Youngest	Frank Baines	United Kingdom	16/07/95	14 years
Oldest	Jim Zona	France	12/02/92	18 years

Rank	Gymnast	D Score	E Score	Pen.	Total
1st place, gold medalist(s)	Andrei Vasile Muntean (ROU)	5.200	8.600		13.800
2nd place, silver medalist(s)	Oliver Hegi (SUI)	5.100	8.650		13.750
3rd place, bronze medalist(s)	Eddy Yusof (SUI)	4.700	8.775		13.475
4	Frank Baines (GBR)	4.900	8.550		13.450
5	Corey Keil (GER)	4.600	8.800		13.400
6	Ferhat Arıcan (TUR)	5.100	8.275		13.375
7	Reiss Beckford (GBR)	4.600	8.550		13.150
8	Jim Zona (FRA)	4.900	7.775		12.675

==== Parallel bars ====
Oldest and youngest competitors

Junior	Name	Country	Date of birth	Age
Youngest	Robert Tvorogal	Lithuania	05/10/94	15 years
Oldest	Jim Zona	France	12/02/92	18 years

Rank	Gymnast	D Score	E Score	Pen.	Total
1st place, gold medalist(s)	Sam Oldham (GBR)	5.100	8.725		13.825
2nd place, silver medalist(s)	Oliver Hegi (SUI)	4.800	8.950		13.750
3rd place, bronze medalist(s)	Fabián González (ESP)	5.600	8.050		13.650
3rd place, bronze medalist(s)	Reiss Beckford (GBR)	5.100	8.550		13.650
5	Dimitris Krasias (CYP)	5.100	8.400		13.500
6	Jim Zona (FRA)	5.000	7.725		12.725
7	Pablo Braegger (SUI)	4.700	7.900		12.600
8	Robert Tvorogal (LTU)	4.700	7.800		12.500

== Medal count ==
=== Combined ===
Rank	Nation	Gold	Silver	Bronze	Total
1	Great Britain	5	3	3	11
2	Germany	2	1	4	7
3	France	1	2	2	5
4	Greece	1	2	0	3
5	Romania	1	1	1	3
5	Spain	1	1	1	3
7	Armenia	1	0	1	2
7	Italy	1	0	1	2
9	Finland	1	0	0	1
10	Switzerland	0	3	2	5
11	Belgium	0	1	0	1
11	Netherlands	0	1	0	1
13	Bulgaria	0	0	1	1
13	Poland	0	0	1	1
13	Slovenia	0	0	1	1
Totals (15 entries)		14	15	18	47

=== Seniors ===
Rank	Nation	Gold	Silver	Bronze	Total
1	Germany	2	1	3	6
2	Great Britain	1	2	1	4
3	Greece	1	2	0	3
4	France	1	1	2	4
5	Finland	1	0	0	1
5	Italy	1	0	0	1
7	Netherlands	0	1	0	1
8	Bulgaria	0	0	1	1
8	Poland	0	0	1	1
8	Romania	0	0	1	1
8	Slovenia	0	0	1	1
Totals (11 entries)		7	7	10	24

=== Juniors ===
Rank	Nation	Gold	Silver	Bronze	Total
1	Great Britain	4	1	2	7
2	Spain	1	1	1	3
3	Romania	1	1	0	2
4	Armenia	1	0	1	2
5	Switzerland	0	3	2	5
6	Belgium	0	1	0	1
6	France	0	1	0	1
8	Germany	0	0	1	1
8	Italy	0	0	1	1
Totals (9 entries)		7	8	8	23
