= Eleftherios Kosmidis =

Greek artistic gymnast

- Full name: Eleftherios Kosmidis
- Born: 6 May 1991 (age 35) Athens, Greece
- Height: 161 cm (5 ft 3 in)

Gymnastics career
- Discipline: Men's artistic gymnastics
- Country represented: Greece; (2006–present)
- Head coach: Georgios Angelou
Medal record
Representing Greece
World Championships
Gold medal – first place	2010 Rotterdam	Floor Exercise
European Championships
Gold medal – first place	2012 Montpelier	Floor Exercise
Silver medal – second place	2010 Birmingham	Floor Exercise
Silver medal – second place	2014 Sofia	Floor Exercise
Bronze medal – third place	2007 Amsterdam	Floor Exercise
Bronze medal – third place	2009 Milan	Floor Exercise
Mediterranean Games
Gold medal – first place	2009 Pescara	Floor Exercise
Gold medal – first place	2013 Mersin	Floor Exercise

Eleftherios "Lefteris" Kosmidis (Greek: Ελευθέριος "Λευτέρης" Κοσμίδης; born 6 May 1991) in Greece is an international elite artistic gymnast and a former world champion on Men's Floor Exercise. He was named the 2010 Greek Male Athlete of the Year.

== Early life ==
Kosmidis was born on May 6, 1991, in Athens, Greece to parents, Thanasis and Sofia Kosmidis; both of whom were elite gymnasts. Similarly, his brother, Xenofon, has competed internationally as an elite gymnast. They both participated at the 2006 European Men's Artistic Gymnastics Championships. He commenced gymnastics training at the age of five.

== Gymnastics career ==
=== 2006–08: Junior career ===
Kosmidis came fourth at the European Junior Championship in 2006. On October 28, 2007, Kosmidis won a Bronze medal on Floor at the gymnastics World Cup in Stuttgart. He went on to compete at the World Cup Grand Prix in Glasgow, winning two medals: silver in the floor exercise and bronze on Vault. In 2008, Kosmidis became Junior European champion on the Men's Floor Exercise ahead of Christian Bazan and Daniel Keatings with a score of 15.525. He went on to win Bronze medals on Floor at the World Cup Grand Prix in Glasgow once again later that year.

=== 2009–present: Senior career ===
In 2009, he competed as a Senior at the European Championships in Milan, winning a Bronze medal on Floor Exercise. In 2010, he won a Silver medal on Floor at the European Championships in Birmingham behind Matthias Farhig. He went on to compete at the World Championships in Rotterdam, where he qualified for the Floor final in 1st place. In the final competition, he won a Gold medal on Floor with a score of 15.700, beating All-Around champion Kohei Uchimura and Daniel Purvis. In 2011, he failed to qualify for the Floor Exercise final at the World Championships in Tokyo, coming in 10th place in the qualification round. He returned to compete at the World Championships in Antwerp in 2013 but once again did not qualify for any of the finals.

In 2014, he competed at the World Championships in Nanning, China. He placed 7th on Floor Exercise in qualifications with a score of 15.533, qualifying him for the Individual Floor Exercise Final.

== Personal life ==
At present, Kosmidis is studying physiotherapy at the Technological Educational Institute of Athens. Additionally, he enjoys playing the guitar and supporting the football club AEK Athens.
