= Adrian Bucur =

Romanian artistic gymnast

- Born: 26 April 1985 (age 41)

Gymnastics career
- Country represented: Romania

Adrian Bucur (born 26 April 1985) is a Romanian male artistic gymnast, representing his nation at international competitions. He participated at the 2008 Summer Olympics in Beijing, China. He also competed in the 2009 World Gymnastics Championships.
