= Tomi Tuuha =

Finnish artistic gymnast

- Born: 28 November 1989 (age 36) Helsinki, Finland

Gymnastics career
- Country represented: Finland
Medal record
Men's artistic gymnastics
Representing Finland
European Championships
Gold medal – first place	2010 Birmingham	Vault

Tomi Jason Tuuha (born 28 November 1989) is a Finnish artistic gymnast. He was a European gold medalist on vault in 2010 in Birmingham.
