= Vasileios Tsolakidis =

Greek gymnast (born 1979)

- Born: 9 September 1979 (age 47) Thessaloniki, Greece

Gymnastics career
- Discipline: Men's artistic gymnastics
- Country represented: Greece
Medal record
Representing Greece
Artistic gymnastics
World Championships
Silver medal – second place	2011 Tokyo	Parallel bars
European Championships
Gold medal – first place	2002 Patras	Parallel bars
Silver medal – second place	2010 Birmingham	Parallel bars
Bronze medal – third place	2011 Berlin	Parallel bars
Mediterranean Games
Gold medal – first place	2001 Tunisi	Parallel bars

Vasileios Tsolakidis (Greek: Βασίλειος Τσολακίδης) (born 9 September 1979) is a Greek gymnast. He competed in the men's parallel bars event at the 2012 Summer Olympics.
