= Daniel Purvis =

British gymnast (born 1990)

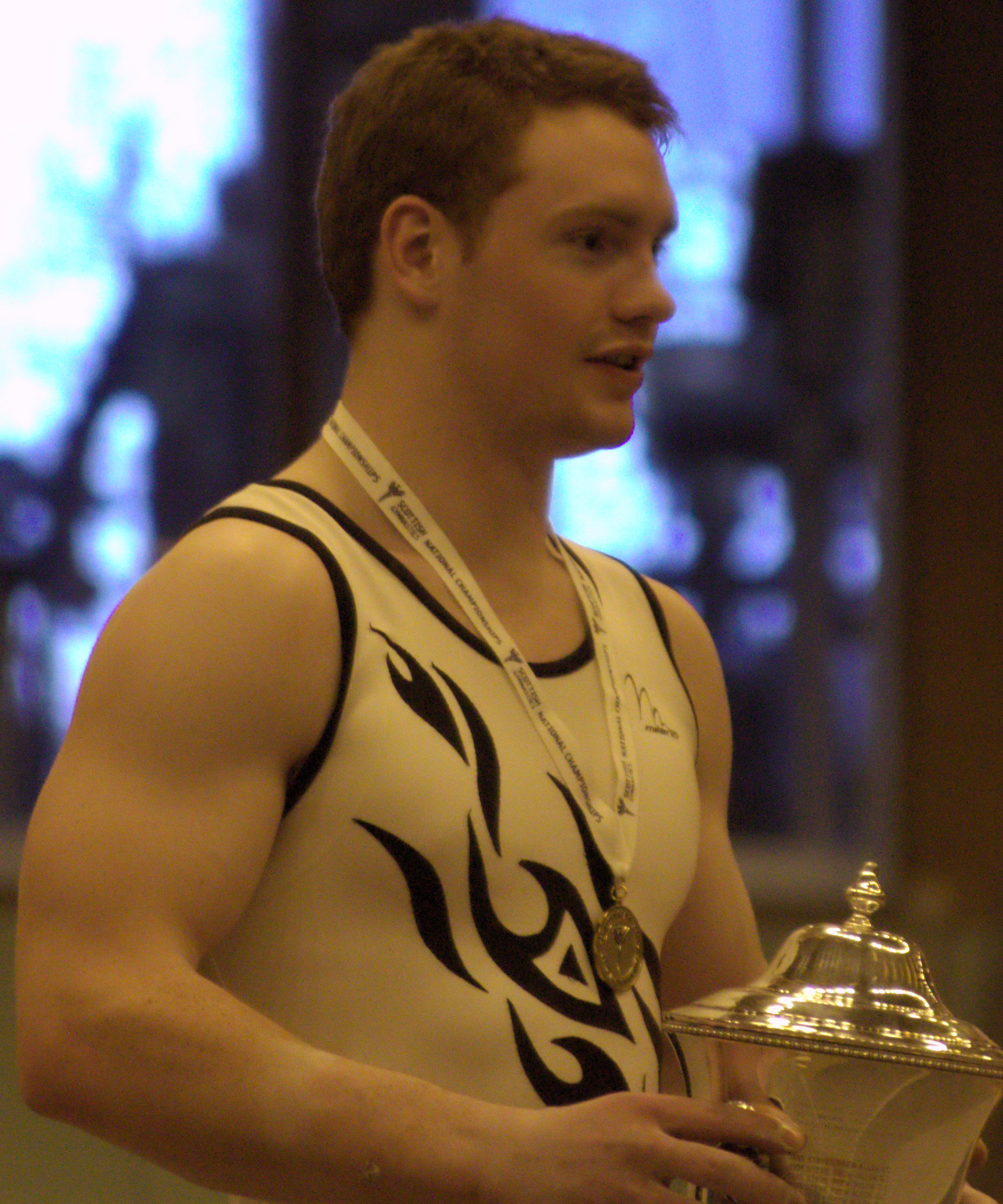

Personal information
- Full name: Daniel Scott Purvis
- Born: 13 November 1990 (age 35) Crosby, England
- Height: 5 ft 7 in (170 cm)

Gymnastics career
- Discipline: Men's artistic gymnastics
- Country represented: (United Kingdom) Great Britain; Scotland
- Club: Southport Gymnastics Club
- Gym: Daniel Purvis Gymnastics
- Head coaches: Jeff Brookes; Andrei Popov
- Retired: 18 February 2019
Medal record
Men's artistic gymnastics
Representing Great Britain
Olympic Games
| Bronze medal – third place | 2012 London | Team |
World Championships
| Silver medal – second place | 2015 Glasgow | Team |
| Bronze medal – third place | 2010 Rotterdam | Floor exercise |
European Championships
| Gold medal – first place | 2012 Montpellier | Team |
| Silver medal – second place | 2010 Birmingham | Team |
| Silver medal – second place | 2014 Sofia | Team |
| Silver medal – second place | 2016 Bern | Team |
| Bronze medal – third place | 2010 Birmingham | Floor exercise |
| Bronze medal – third place | 2011 Berlin | All-around |
| Bronze medal – third place | 2014 Sofia | Floor exercise |
| Bronze medal – third place | 2015 Montpellier | All-around |
Representing Scotland
Commonwealth Games
| Gold medal – first place | 2014 Glasgow | Parallel bars |
| Silver medal – second place | 2014 Glasgow | Team |
| Bronze medal – third place | 2014 Glasgow | Rings |
| Bronze medal – third place | 2018 Gold Coast | Team |
| Bronze medal – third place | 2018 Gold Coast | Floor exercise |

Daniel Scott Purvis (born 13 November 1990 in Crosby, England) is a Scottish former international elite artistic gymnast, and three-time British all-around champion in men's artistic gymnastics. He trained at Southport YMCA and was coached by Jeff Brookes and Andrei Popov. He was part of the first British men's team to win a medal at a World Championships in 2015.

== Gymnastics career ==
During his time as a junior, he came 4th in the team for Great Britain at the Junior European Championships in Greece in 2006. Two years later in Lausanne he helped the British team win the gold medal, and individually won the all-around silver at the Junior European Championships again.

=== 2010 ===
As a senior in 2010, Purvis co-won the British all-around title alongside Samuel Hunter. In the same year, he attended the European Gymnastics Championships in Birmingham, and won a silver medal as part of the British team, and a bronze medal on floor exercise. At the 2010 World Championships in Rotterdam, he won another bronze medal on floor exercise.

=== 2011 ===
In 2011, Purvis once again won the all-around title in the British Championships. He earned a bronze medal in the all-around competition at the European Gymnastics Championships in Berlin, Germany; and won the 2011 FIG World Cup Event in Glasgow, beating Philipp Boy, who later pipped him to 4th place at the World Championships in Tokyo. At the World Championships In October, Great Britain's Men's team hoped to qualify to the 2012 Summer Olympics but had a surprisingly awful time in the preliminary rounds. Despite his teammates making several costly mistakes and falls, Purvis was a steady rock for the team, performing consistently in every event, qualifying for the all-around finals. He came fourth in the all-around competition, missing out on a medal by 0.323 marks. His performances in the World Cup competitions meant that he was the overall winner for the World Cup Series in 2011.

=== 2012 ===
Due to the British men's team failing to qualify for the Olympics at the World Championships in Tokyo, they were able to send a team to the Olympic Test event in London in January. Once again, Purvis gave a strong performance to help the team qualify for the Olympics. Their qualifying score of 358.227 would have put them in 4th place going into team finals had they given the same performance in Tokyo. Purvis also got the highest all-around score at the event, with teammates Kristian Thomas and Daniel Keatings taking 2nd and 3rd place respectively. In the apparatus finals he tied with Tomás González for victory in the floor. In May, Purvis led the British team in qualifications for the European Championships in Montpelier, despite having been ill with food poisoning the previous night. After only 3 hours sleep he started the competition on vault and fell into a judge's lap. Echoing a performance given by US gymnast Paul Hamm at the 2004 Summer Olympics he rallied, and went on to qualify with the highest all-around score. The team went on to win Britain's first team Gold in the finals. Although Purvis made the floor finals, it was decided by the team coaches that he would not compete to give him a rest after having been ill earlier in the week. In June 2012, Purvis won the British Artistic Gymnastics Championships for the third consecutive time.

At the London Olympics, Purvis was part of the bronze medal-winning GB men's team, competing on 30 July 2012 at the North Greenwich Arena, and competed in the all-around competition with teammate Kristian Thomas.

=== 2014 ===
On 19–25 May 2014, at the 2014 European Championships in Sofia. Purvis, along with his teammates Daniel Keatings, Sam Oldham, Max Whitlock, and Kristian Thomas, won Team Great Britain the silver medal behind Russia with a total score of 262.087 points. In event finals, Purvis won the bronze medal in floor (15.400). At the 2014 Commonwealth Games, he won gold in the parallel bars and bronze in the rings, and helped Scotland win silver in the men's team event.

=== 2015 ===
Purvis was chosen to be part of the British men's team at the 2015 European Artistic Gymnastics Championships in Montpellier, where he won his second European all-around bronze medal.

In 2015 Purvis was given a berth to compete for Great Britain at the World Gymnastics Championships. Performing solid routines on all six events, Daniel helped the team qualify for a spot at the 2016 Olympic Games. He also qualified in 3rd for the men's all-around final ahead of British teammates Max Whitlock and Nile Wilson. On 29 October, the British team went through all 18 routines without any falls, with Purvis and Whitlock anchoring the team's final score with magnificent performances on the floor. Purvis, Whitlock, Wilson, Kristian Thomas, Brinn Bevan and Louis Smith became the first British men's team to finish on podium at a World Championships securing the silver medal with a score of 270.345, ahead of reigning World and Olympic Champion team China (269.959) and behind the new World Champions, Japan (270.818). Two days later Purvis competed in the all-around final and finished in 7th. On 31 October he competed in the floor final, where he finished in 5th.

=== 2018–2019 ===
At the 2018 Commonwealth Games, Purvis won bronze in the floor and helped Scotland win bronze in the team event. On February 18, 2019, Purvis announced his retirement from gymnastics.

=== 2020 ===
In January 2020, Purvis was inducted into the British Gymnastics Hall of Fame.
