= Matthias Fahrig =

German gymnast (born 1985)

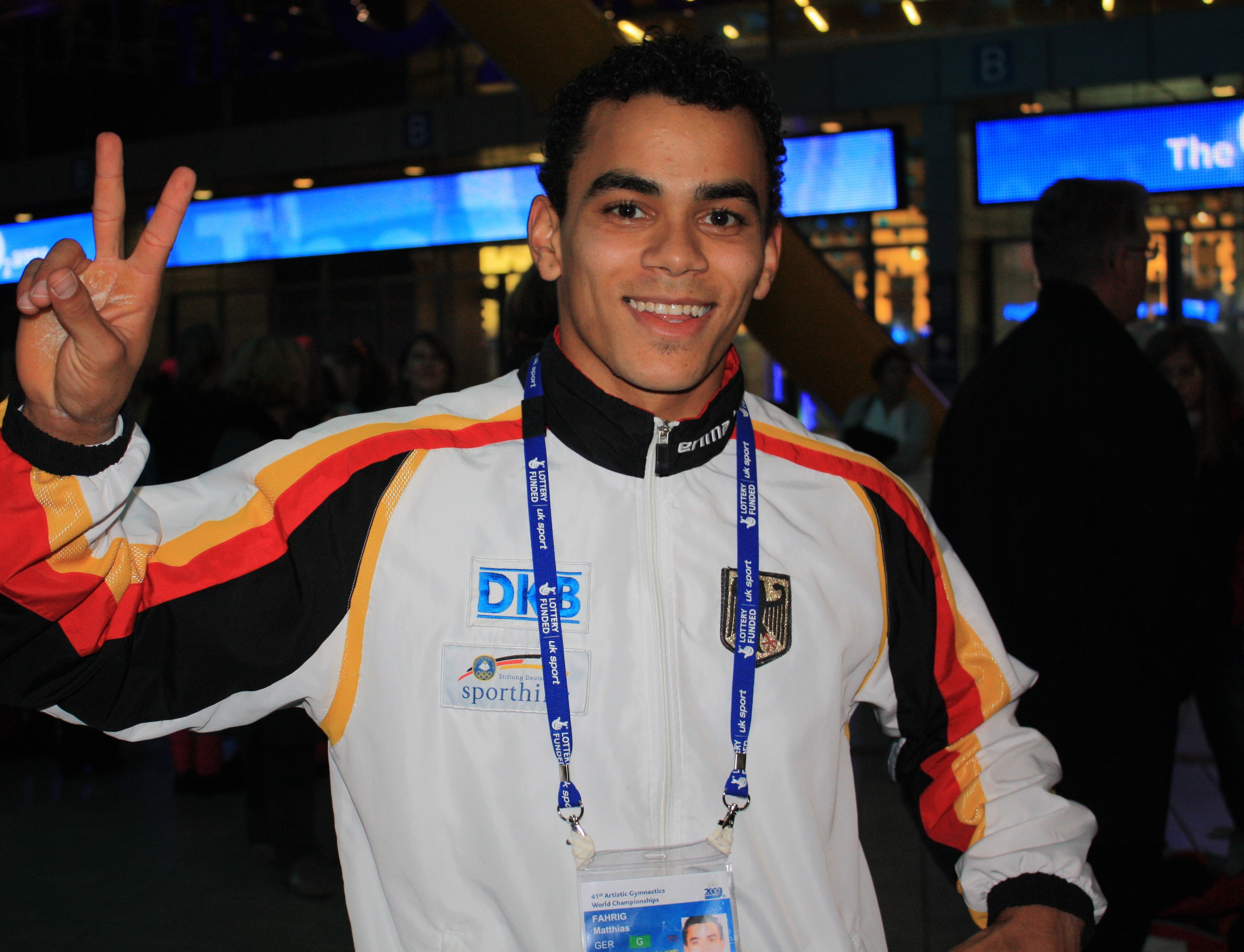
- Fahrig in 2009

Personal information
- Born: 15 December 1985 (age 40) Lutherstadt Wittenberg, East Germany
- Height: 1.65 m (5 ft 5 in)

Gymnastics career
- Discipline: Men's artistic gymnastics
- Country represented: Germany
- Club: SV Halle
Medal record
Representing Germany
World Championships
Bronze medal – third place	2010 Rotterdam	Team
European Championships
Gold medal – first place	2010 Birmingham	Team
Gold medal – first place	2010 Birmingham	Floor
Silver medal – second place	2009 Milan	Floor
Silver medal – second place	2010 Birmingham	Vault
Bronze medal – third place	2007 Amsterdam	Floor
Bronze medal – third place	2009 Milan	Vault

Matthias Fahrig (born 15 December 1985) is a German gymnast. He competed at the 2004 Summer Olympics in all artistic gymnastics events except for the rings and pommel horse and finished in eighth place with the German team. His best individual results were 32nd place on the horizontal bar and in the floor exercise.

He won two gold, two silver and two bronze medals in the vault, floor and team competitions at the European Championships in 2007, 2009 and 2010, as well as a team bronze at the 2010 World Artistic Gymnastics Championships.

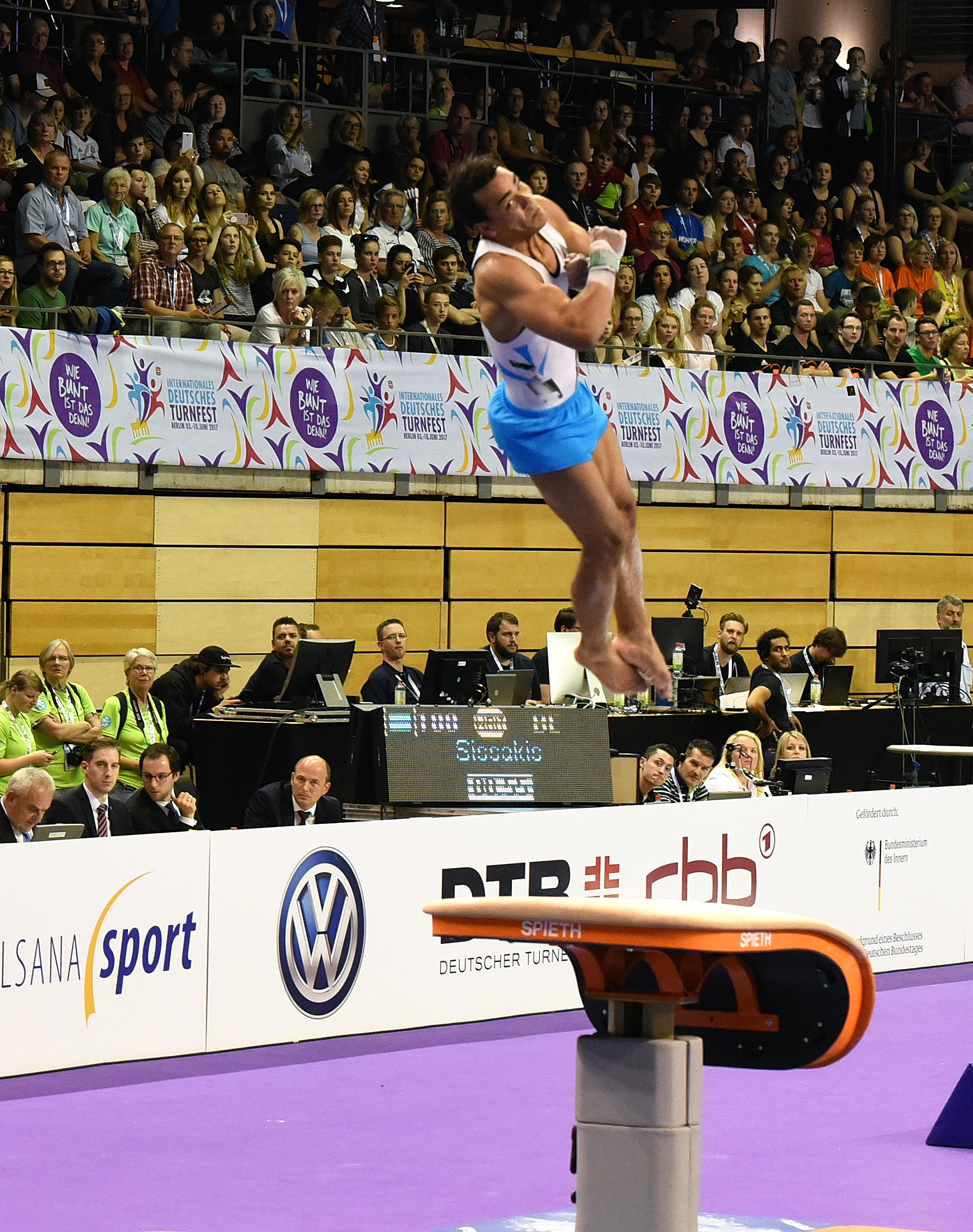
Matthias Fahrig at the vault, 2017.
