= Samuel Hunter (gymnast) =

British gymnast (born 1988)

- Born: 14 September 1988 (age 37) Nottingham, England

Gymnastics career
- Discipline: Men's artistic gymnastics
- Country represented: (United Kingdom) Great Britain
- Club: Nottingham Gymnastics Academy
Medal record
European Championships
Silver medal – second place	2010 Birmingham	Team

Samuel Hunter (born 14 September 1988 in Nottingham, England) is a retired British elite male artistic gymnast. Following his retirement, Hunter was appointed as an elite development coach by British Gymnastics.

Hunter was part of the first Great Britain team ever to win a medal in the men's team event, a silver, at the European Artistic Gymnastics Championships in 2010.

== Gymnastics career ==
=== 2010 ===
In 2010, Sam became the British All-Around champion with national squad teammate Daniel Purvis. At the European Championships in Birmingham, Sam was a valuable part of the British men's team who won the Silver medal in the team competition. This was the first time the men's team had made the team final. The British men's team went on to compete in the 2010 World Artistic Gymnastics Championships in Rotterdam where they qualified in 4th and placed 7th in the team final. Sam qualified to the All-Around final where he finished 9th.

=== 2011 ===
Sam competed in the AT&T American Cup, with fellow Brit Daniel Purvis. Sam was chosen to compete for the British team at the European Championships in Berlin. The team did not have a great showing, and Sam did not qualify for any of the finals.
