= Marijo Možnik =

Croatian gymnast (born 1987)

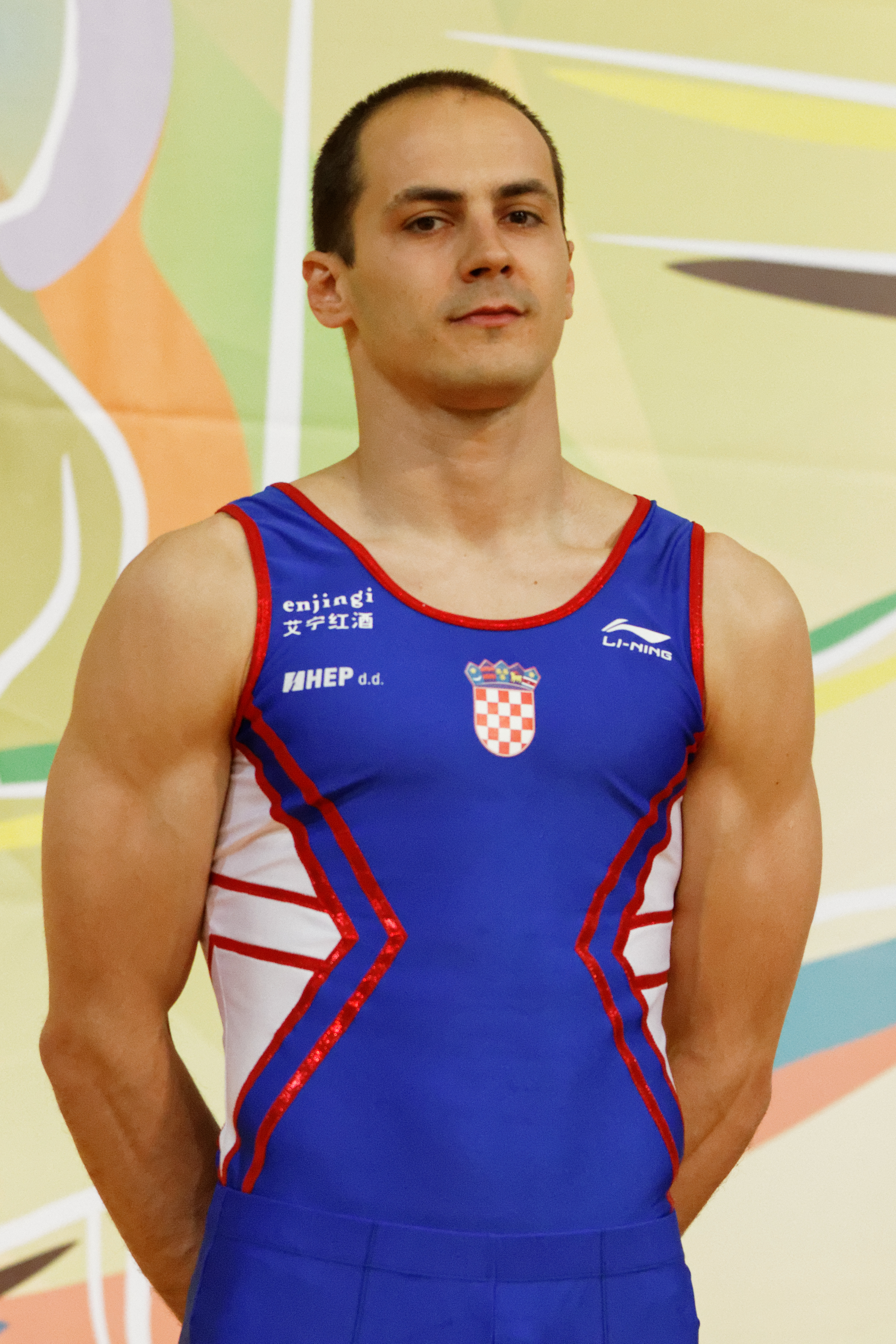
- Možnik at the 2015 European Championships

Personal information
- Born: 18 January 1987 (age 39) Zagreb, Croatia

Gymnastics career
- Discipline: Men's artistic gymnastics
- Country represented: Croatia
- Club: ZTD "Hrvatski sokol"
- Retired: 2019
Medal record
Representing Croatia
World Championships
Bronze medal – third place	2014 Nanning	Horizontal bar
European Championships
Gold medal – first place	2015 Montpellier	Horizontal Bar
Silver medal – second place	2012 Montpellier	Horizontal bar
Mediterranean Games
Silver medal – second place	2013 Mersin	Horizontal Bar

Marijo Možnik (born 18 January 1987 in Zagreb) is a retired Croatian gymnast, horizontal bar specialist, and current president of the Croatian Gymnastics Federation. He is known for a gymnastic element "Možnik", named after him. He was 2015 European Champion and 2012 silver-medalist, as well as bronze medalist at the 2014 World Championship.

== Gymnastics career ==
Možnik's notable results are a bronze medal at the 2014 World Championships, a gold medal at the 2015 European Championships, and a silver medal at the 2012 European Championships. At the 2007 World Championships Možnik introduced a new gymnastic element named after him. He is the laureate of the Croatian Franjo Bučar State Award for Sport for 2013. Možnik retired from the sport in 2019.

== Post-gymnastics career ==
In May 2020, Možnik was elected president of the Croatian Gymnastics Federation. As the president of the CGF, he was also president of the Organisation Committee for the 37th Men's and 36th Women's European Artistic Gymnastics Championships held in Arena Zagreb during the July-August of 2026, with 625 gymnasts participating.

== Personal life ==
His mother was a teacher. In an interview for Glas Koncila in August 2026, he stated that "her pedagogical style helped me a lot in the later stages of gymnastics, especially when certain crises and considerations arose in my professional career, how to continue." He also confessed his Catholic faith: "I am a man who practices faith and I can testify that faith has helped me through some of the most difficult moments in my sporting and life journey."
