= Dan Keatings =

British artistic gymnast (born 1990)

Daniel Keatings
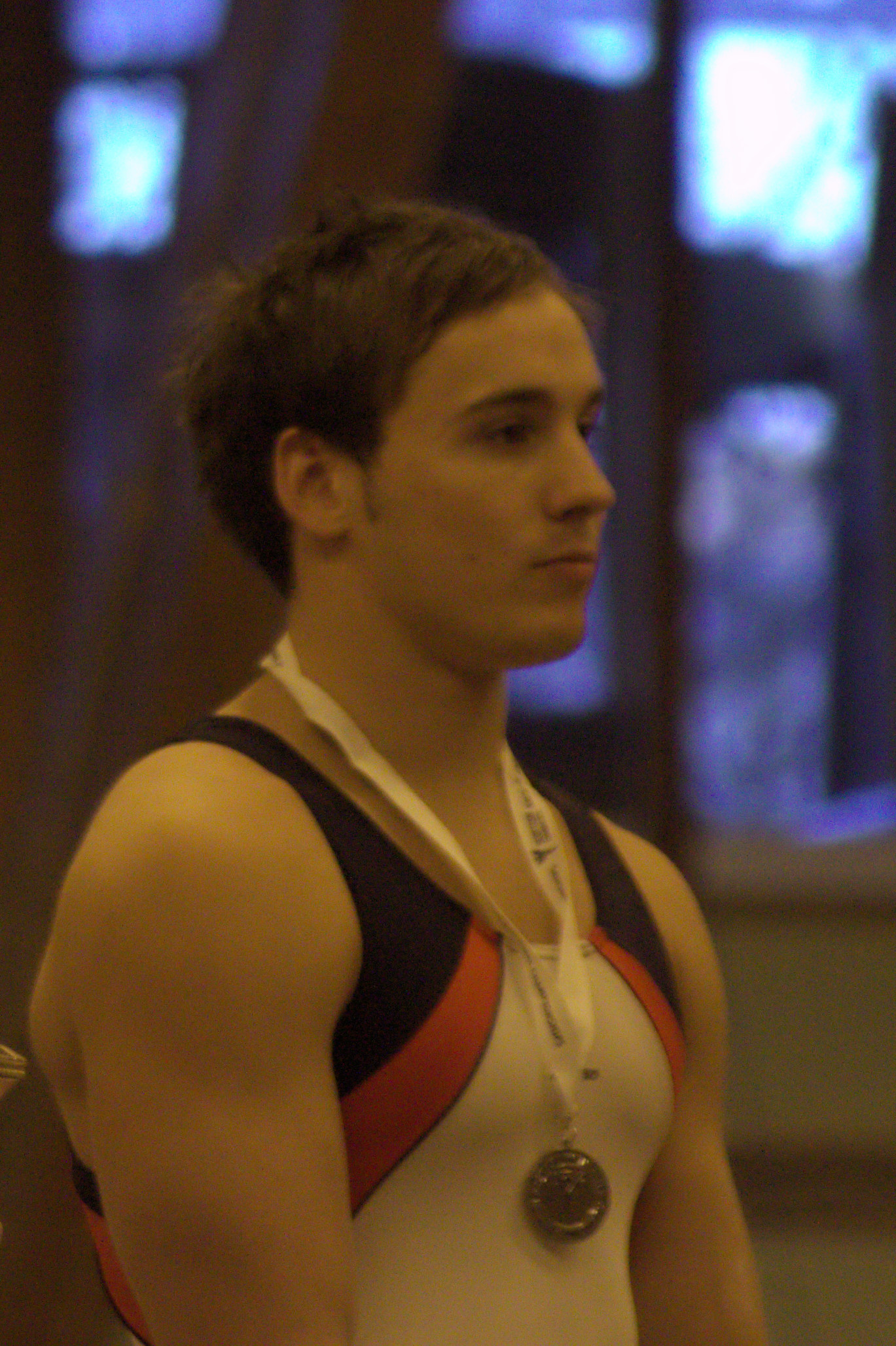

Personal information
- Full name: Daniel Ryan Keatings
- Nickname: Dan
- Born: 4 January 1990 (age 36) Kettering, Northamptonshire, England
- Height: 173 cm (5 ft 8 in)

Gymnastics career
- Discipline: Men's artistic gymnastics
- Country represented: (United Kingdom) Great Britain; Scotland
- Club: Huntingdon Gymnastics Club
- Head coach: Paul Hall
- Assistant coach: Ben Howells
Medal record
Men's artistic gymnastics
Representing Great Britain
World Championships
Silver medal – second place	2009 London	All-around
European Championships
Gold medal – first place	2010 Birmingham	Pommel horse
Gold medal – first place	2013 Moscow	Pommel horse
Silver medal – second place	2007 Amsterdam	Pommel horse
Silver medal – second place	2009 Milan	All-around
Silver medal – second place	2010 Birmingham	Team
Silver medal – second place	2014 Sofia	Team
Bronze medal – third place	2009 Milan	Pommel horse
Representing Scotland
Commonwealth Games
Gold medal – first place	2014 Glasgow	Pommel horse
Silver medal – second place	2014 Glasgow	Team
Silver medal – second place	2014 Glasgow	All-around
Northern European Championships
Silver medal – second place	2013 Lisburn	Team
Silver medal – second place	2013 Lisburn	Pommel horse

Daniel Ryan Keatings (born 4 January 1990) is a retired British artistic gymnast representing Scotland and Great Britain. Both an all-around gymnast and a specialist pommel horse worker, Keatings was the first male British gymnast to medal at the all-around competition at the World Championships, and the first male British gymnast to become a European champion, winning on pommel horse, his signature piece, in 2010 in Birmingham and again in 2013 in Moscow. In 2014, he won gold at the Commonwealth Games, again in pommel horse, for Scotland. With Louis Smith, Max Whitlock and Joe Fraser of England and Great Britain, and Rhys McClenaghan of Northern Ireland and Ireland, Keatings formed part of a golden generation of home nations pommel horse workers who dominated the apparatus at global, continental and Commonwealth Games level from 2010 onwards.

== Gymnastics career ==
Keatings represented Scotland at the 2006 Commonwealth Games and Great Britain at the 2007 World Artistic Gymnastics Championships, 2009 World Artistic Gymnastics Championships, 2011 World Artistic Gymnastics Championships and the 2008 Summer Olympics.

In April 2009, Keatings won the all-around silver medal in the European Gymnastics Championships in Milan. He also won the bronze medal in the pommel horse final. In September 2009 Keatings gained a sponsorship deal with business power supplier Opus Energy. The company agreed to cover his competition fees, equipment, and travel costs. During the same year, Daniel also became an official ambassador for premium sports nutrition brand Maximuscle.

On 15 October 2009, Keatings made history when he became the first British gymnast to win a medal in the all-around event at the Artistic World Championships. The event, which was held at the O2 Arena in London, saw Keatings rise to the occasion and record a score of 88.925, taking the silver medal in front of the home crowd.

On 25 April 2010, Keatings made history again when he won Great Britain's first-ever Senior European Championship gold medal on the pommel horse the day after he helped Great Britain to win a historic silver medal in the team competition (their previous highest finish was 9th in 2008).

Returning from an injury, he made a comeback at the 2011 World Artistic Gymnastics Championships in Tokyo. He did not have a good competition in the preliminary rounds, including a fall off the pommel horse and a particularly nasty fall on high bar. He was not the only one of the British men's team to falter, and the team did not qualify through to the team final, finishing in 10th place. In addition, Keatings failed to qualify through to any of the individual event finals.

On 25 March 2012, Daniel competed at the Turnier der Meister FIG Challenge Cup C III Apparatus, Cottbus, Germany. After exceeding all expectations, Daniel reached the final and held his nerve, producing a quality routine that scored 15.775 for the silver medal, just over a tenth of a mark behind the Olympic champion, Xiao Qin of China.

Keatings again represented Scotland at the 2014 Commonwealth Games in Glasgow. As part of the Scottish team, he won a silver medal in the team competition on 29 July 2014 and followed this with another silver in the individual all-around final on 30 July. Keatings won gold in the pommel horse final on 31 July with a score of 16.058.
