= 2011 World Artistic Gymnastics Championships – Women's qualification =

The women's qualification competition at the 2011 World Artistic Gymnastics Championships took place October 7–8, 2011, in Tokyo. A total of 216 gymnasts participated.

== Team ==
Team	Vault (gymnastics)		Uneven bars		Balance beam		Floor (gymnastics)		Total (All-around)	
Team	Score	Rank	Score	Rank	Score	Rank	Score	Rank	Score	Rank
United States	60.190	1	57.999	3	58.932	2	57.132	1	234.253	1
Jordyn Wieber (USA)	15.433	2	14.800	7	15.233	3	14.566	3	60.032	2
Aly Raisman (USA)	14.666	7	14.000	22	14.933	6	14.833	1	58.432	4
Gabby Douglas (USA)	14.558	12	14.866	6	14.400	15	13.833	23	57.657	5
Sabrina Vega (USA)	14.066	33	14.333	14	14.366	18	13.900	19	56.665	9
McKayla Maroney (USA)	15.533	1	13.666	33	13.300	61	13.833	22	56.332	12
Alicia Sacramone (USA)										
Russia	57.082	5	58.899	1	58.699	3	56.382	4	231.062	2
Viktoria Komova (RUS)	14.533	14	15.733	1	15.400	1	14.491	5	60.157	1
Ksenia Afanasyeva (RUS)	14.433	18	14.083	21	14.100	28	14.325	10	56.941	6
Anna Dementyeva (RUS)	13.600	69	14.200	19	14.400	14	12.133	132	54.333	31
Tatiana Nabieva (RUS)	14.516	16	14.883	5						
Yulia Belokobylskaya (RUS)	13.533	80			14.333	19	14.133	13		
Yulia Inshina (RUS)			13.900	26	14.566	10	13.433	44		
China	57.766	4	56.198	4	59.707	1	56.699	2	230.370	3
Yao Jinnan (CHN)	14.866	4	14.566	9	15.066	4	14.533	4	59.031	3
Jiang Yuyuan (CHN)	14.000	39	12.866	75	14.575	9	13.633	33	55.074	20
Huang Qiushuang (CHN)	14.600	11	14.900	4	14.666	8	12.766	87	56.932	7
Tan Sixin (CHN)	14.300	26	13.866	27	13.966	32	13.933	17	56.065	15
Sui Lu (CHN)	13.533	80			15.400	2	14.600	2		
He Kexin (CHN)			12.733	80						
Romania	58.165	2	53.698	10	58.666	4	56.699	2	227.228	4
Cătălina Ponor (ROU)	14.766	6			15.000	5	14.200	12		
Amelia Racea (ROU)	14.400	21	13.666	34	14.733	7				
Raluca Haidu (ROU)	14.366	23	13.833	29	14.533	11	13.733	27	56.465	10
Diana Chelaru (ROU)	14.633	8	13.533	43			14.233	11		
Ana Porgras (ROU)	13.900	46	12.666	82	14.400	16	13.866	20	54.832	22
Diana Bulimar (ROU)			12.433	91	14.066	29	14.400	8		

== Individual all-around ==
Rank	Gymnast	Nation	Vault (gymnastics)	Uneven bars	Balance beam	Floor (gymnastics)	Total	Qual.
1	Viktoria Komova	Russia	14.533	15.733	15.400	14.491	60.157	Q
2	Jordyn Wieber	United States	15.433	14.800	15.233	14.566	60.032	Q
3	Yao Jinnan	China	14.866	14.566	15.066	14.533	59.031	Q
4	Aly Raisman	United States	14.666	14.000	14.933	14.833	58.432	Q
5	Gabby Douglas	United States	14.558	14.866	14.400	13.833	57.657	-
6	Ksenia Afanasyeva	Russia	14.433	14.083	14.100	14.325	56.941	Q
7	Huang Qiushuang	China	14.600	14.900	14.666	12.766	56.932	Q
8	Elisabeth Seitz	Germany	14.633	14.433	13.800	13.866	56.732	Q
9	Sabrina Vega	United States	14.066	14.333	14.366	13.900	56.665	-
10	Raluca Haidu	Romania	14.366	13.833	14.533	13.733	56.465	Q
11	Koko Tsurumi	Japan	13.500	14.933	14.266	13.666	56.365	Q
12	McKayla Maroney	United States	15.533	13.666	13.300	13.833	56.332	-
13	Lauren Mitchell	Australia	14.300	13.600	14.033	14.391	56.324	Q
14	Vanessa Ferrari	Italy	14.266	13.233	14.233	14.466	56.198	Q
15	Tan Sixin	China	14.300	13.866	13.966	13.933	56.065	-
16	Nadine Jarosch	Germany	14.200	13.600	13.700	14.000	55.500	Q
17	Hannah Whelan	Great Britain	13.666	13.433	14.400	13.966	55.465	Q
18	Céline van Gerner	Netherlands	13.466	14.166	14.300	13.533	55.465	Q
19	Rie Tanaka	Japan	13.966	14.466	13.600	13.400	55.432	Q
20	Jiang Yuyuan	China	14.000	12.866	14.575	13.633	55.074	-
21	Yuko Shintake	Japan	13.500	14.233	13.933	13.366	55.032	-
22	Ana Porgras	Romania	13.900	12.666	14.400	13.866	54.832	Q
23	Yu Minobe	Japan	13.333	14.433	13.933	13.033	54.732	-
24	Emily Little	Australia	14.533	13.566	13.533	13.100	54.732	Q
25	Jessica López	Venezuela	13.566	13.966	13.266	13.933	54.731	Q
26	Ana Maria Izurieta	Spain	13.733	13.833	13.866	13.266	54.698	Q
27	Christine Lee	Canada	13.733	13.800	13.466	13.633	54.632	Q
28	Daniele Hypólito	Brazil	13.833	12.800	14.133	13.791	54.557	Q
29	Giulia Steingruber	Switzerland	14.866	13.300	13.066	13.266	54.498	Q
30	Aurélie Malaussena	France	13.533	13.433	13.908	13.491	54.365	Q
31	Anna Dementyeva	Russia	13.600	14.200	14.400	12.133	54.333	-
32	Carlotta Ferlito	Italy	13.933	13.000	13.866	13.533	54.332	Q
33	Marine Brevet	France	13.566	13.633	13.866	13.266	54.331	R
34	Danusia Francis	Great Britain	13.466	13.266	14.033	13.200	53.965	R
35	Heo Seon-mi	South Korea	13.733	14.233	13.266	12.700	53.932	R
36	Emily Armi	Italy	13.500	12.933	13.900	13.533	53.866	-
37	Jennifer Pinches	Great Britain	13.200	13.533	13.900	13.133	53.766	-
38	Jade Barbosa	Brazil	14.400	13.200	13.233	12.900	53.733	R
39	Vasiliki Millousi	Greece	12.833	12.733	14.450	13.400	53.416	
40	Nastassia Marachkouskaya	Belarus	14.066	13.200	13.733	12.000	52.999	
41	Kim Bui	Germany	13.833	12.500	13.133	13.533	52.999	
42	Georgia-Rose Brown	Australia	13.633	13.600	13.266	12.500	52.999	
43	Joy Goedkoop	Netherlands	13.500	12.966	13.466	13.066	52.998	
44	Valeria Maksyuta	Israel	14.166	11.566	13.600	13.583	52.915	
45	Kristina Vaculik	Canada	13.666	12.966	13.733	12.466	52.831	
46	Lisa Katharina Hill	Germany	13.600	14.000	12.900	12.266	52.766	
47	Ana Lago	Mexico	13.700	11.533	13.766	13.733	52.732	
48	Daria Elizarova	Uzbekistan	13.166	12.866	13.033	13.666	52.731	
49	María Paula Vargas	Spain	13.700	13.033	13.300	12.600	52.633	
50	Ana Sofía Gómez	Guatemala	14.366	12.000	13.466	12.708	52.540	
51	Volha Makhautsova	Belarus	13.566	13.133	12.933	12.900	52.532	
52	Austin Sheppard	Hungary	14.533	12.933	12.366	12.633	52.465	
53	Eum Eun-hui	South Korea	13.466	13.033	12.833	13.033	52.365	
54	Park Kyung-jin	South Korea	13.900	12.200	13.300	12.933	52.333	
55	Sophia Serseri	France	13.933	13.000	12.700	12.700	52.333	
56	Wyomi Masela	Netherlands	13.966	12.000	13.000	13.333	52.299	
57	Dorina Böczögő	Hungary	14.000	12.933	12.266	13.066	52.265	
58	Kristýna Pálešová	Czech Republic	13.233	13.166	13.033	12.800	52.232	
59	Bruna Leal	Brazil	13.500	12.800	12.833	13.000	52.133	
60	Luiza Galiulina	Uzbekistan	13.200	12.733	13.000	13.133	52.066	
61	Aagje Vanwalleghem	Belgium	13.800	12.033	13.200	13.000	52.033	
62	Dominique Pegg	Canada	13.900	12.266	12.200	13.666	52.032	
63	Elsa García	Mexico	12.933	12.666	12.433	13.966	51.998	
64	Jonna Adlerteg	Sweden	13.400	13.700	12.100	12.766	51.966	
65	Marta Pihan	Poland	13.641	11.708	12.900	13.600	51.849	
66	Ida Gustafsson	Sweden	13.033	13.700	12.166	12.933	51.832	
67	Jo Hyun-joo	South Korea	14.433	10.433	13.600	13.333	51.799	
68	Ainhoa Carmona	Spain	13.333	12.866	12.966	12.633	51.798	
69	Barbara Gasser	Austria	13.433	13.100	12.700	12.500	51.733	
70	Marlies Rijken	Netherlands	13.533	12.933	12.400	12.866	51.732	
71	Tina Erceg	Croatia	13.366	11.866	13.291	13.133	51.656	
72	Gabriela Janik	Poland	13.683	13.266	12.700	11.866	51.515	
73	Jessica Diacci	Switzerland	13.233	11.866	13.566	12.666	51.331	
74	Roni Rabinovitz	Israel	13.466	12.300	13.266	12.100	51.132	
75	Gaelle Mys	Belgium	13.333	12.466	13.566	11.733	51.098	
76	Simona Castro	Chile	13.500	12.466	12.466	12.633	51.065	
77	Jessica Gil Ortiz	Colombia	14.000	11.866	12.500	12.666	51.032	
78	Yevheniya Cherniy	Ukraine	13.400	12.366	12.866	12.400	51.032	
79	Nathalia Sánchez	Colombia	13.133	13.266	12.633	11.966	50.998	
80	Linda Stämpfli	Switzerland	13.066	12.566	12.400	12.600	50.632	
81	Angelina Kysla	Ukraine	13.600	12.266	12.333	12.400	50.599	
82	Alina Fomenko	Ukraine	14.066	13.300	10.833	12.300	50.499	
83	Natalia Kononenko	Ukraine	12.733	13.600	11.466	12.433	50.232	
84	Hiu Ying Angel Wong	Hong Kong	13.233	11.166	12.700	12.866	49.965	
85	Monica Yool	Guatemala	13.233	12.066	13.100	11.500	49.899	
86	Saša Golob	Slovenia	13.066	12.133	12.166	12.500	49.865	
87	Ashleigh Heldsinger	South Africa	13.233	12.100	12.233	12.133	49.699	
88	Yana Demyanchuk	Ukraine	12.700	12.533	12.433	11.933	49.599	
89	Karla Salazar	Mexico	13.666	11.733	12.033	12.000	49.432	
90	Laura Gombás	Hungary	13.066	12.000	12.791	11.500	49.357	
91	Phan Thị Hà Thanh	Vietnam	14.366	10.900	11.433	12.600	49.299	
92	Paschalina Mitrakou	Greece	13.033	11.233	12.366	12.500	49.132	
93	Mária Homolová	Slovakia	12.866	11.666	12.775	11.766	49.073	
94	Ivet Rojas	Venezuela	13.333	11.466	11.833	12.300	48.932	
95	Catalina Escobar	Colombia	14.433	12.166	10.100	12.133	48.832	
96	Elisa Hämmerle	Austria	13.166	12.166	10.900	12.566	48.798	
97	Dilnoza Abdusalimova	Uzbekistan	13.133	9.633	13.133	12.866	48.765	
98	Göksu Üçtaş	Turkey	13.066	11.000	11.300	13.333	48.699	
99	Zoi Lima	Portugal	13.566	10.233	12.066	12.766	48.631	
100	Adela Šajn	Slovenia	13.466	10.600	13.500	11.033	48.599	
101	Lisa Ecker	Austria	13.566	10.833	11.633	12.566	48.598	
102	Teja Belak	Slovenia	13.733	11.466	12.800	10.433	48.432	
103	Heem Wei Lim	Singapore	13.066	11.000	12.400	11.966	48.432	
104	Nadia Bäriswyl	Switzerland	12.966	11.833	11.766	11.866	48.431	
105	Asal Saparbaeva	Uzbekistan	12.900	11.333	11.400	12.666	48.299	
106	Annika Urvikko	Finland	13.400	11.933	10.433	12.400	48.166	
107	Fiona Novak	Slovenia	12.800	11.800	10.966	12.500	48.066	
108	Nicole Szabo	South Africa	13.133	11.300	11.900	11.733	48.066	
109	Jordan Rae	New Zealand	11.833	11.700	12.466	11.733	47.732	
110	Eline Vandersteen	Belgium	13.133	11.066	12.700	10.666	47.565	
111	Ivana Kamnikar	Slovenia	12.700	11.866	11.033	11.966	47.565	
112	Alina Sotnikava	Belarus	13.633	9.633	11.533	12.666	47.465	
113	Rosanna Ojala	Finland	13.133	11.133	10.700	12.200	47.166	
114	Reeta Pietilä	Finland	12.866	8.800	13.066	12.433	47.165	
115	Luca Divéky	Hungary	13.133	10.266	12.400	11.300	47.099	
116	Dimitra Stamatiadou	Greece	11.833	10.066	12.266	12.766	46.931	
117	Moldir Azimbay	Kazakhstan	12.733	10.366	12.433	11.225	46.757	
118	Merlina Galera	Argentina	13.300	9.700	11.366	12.266	46.632	
119	Fanny Briceño	Venezuela	13.400	11.433	10.666	11.100	46.599	
120	Yamilet Peña	Dominican Republic	13.933	10.933	10.333	11.366	46.565	
121	Paula Mejías	Puerto Rico	13.666	9.566	11.300	11.933	46.465	
122	Alexandra Choon	Portugal	12.866	10.600	10.833	12.166	46.465	
123	Demet Mutlu	Turkey	13.166	11.833	9.266	12.133	46.398	
124	Ralitsa Mileva	Bulgaria	12.900	10.300	11.500	11.600	46.300	
125	Laura Švilpaitė	Lithuania	12.666	10.733	11.133	11.600	46.132	
126	Elisavet Tsakou	Greece	12.633	9.766	11.933	11.733	46.065	
127	Briana Mitchell	New Zealand	12.333	10.383	12.000	11.300	46.016	
128	Houry Gebeshian	Armenia	12.500	11.133	10.633	11.633	45.899	
129	Tijana Tkalčec	Croatia	13.533	8.866	11.400	12.033	45.832	
130	Salma Mohamed	Egypt	12.300	11.033	10.800	11.300	45.433	
131	Dina Madir	Croatia	12.833	9.500	11.300	11.633	45.266	
132	Makarena Pinto	Chile	12.800	9.900	10.833	11.508	45.041	
133	Đỗ Thị Thu Huyền	Vietnam	12.800	8.766	11.166	12.133	44.865	
134	Charlotte McKenna	Ireland	12.733	10.566	11.866	9.600	44.765	
135	Sherine El-Zeiny	Egypt	12.700	9.533	11.700	10.641	44.574	
136	Karina Regidor	Costa Rica	12.666	10.133	10.425	11.266	44.490	
137	Karoline Sondov	Norway	11.833	9.800	10.400	12.400	44.433	
138	Chen Yu-Chun	Chinese Taipei	12.700	8.566	11.833	11.266	44.365	
139	Michelle Lauritsen	Denmark	12.666	10.533	10.000	11.100	44.299	
140	Alexa Grande	Guatemala	13.433	9.966	8.966	11.866	44.231	
141	Dewi Prahara	Indonesia	12.800	10.466	10.700	10.233	44.199	
142	Cătălina Ponor	Romania	14.766	-	15.000	14.200	43.966	
143	Shaden Wohdan	Qatar	12.833	9.100	10.966	11.033	43.932	
144	Nancy Taman	Egypt	13.100	7.408	11.133	12.133	43.774	
145	Thema Williams	Trinidad and Tobago	12.100	10.900	10.733	10.000	43.733	
146	Mia Furu	Denmark	12.500	9.266	10.166	11.666	43.598	
147	Sui Lu	China	13.533	-	15.400	14.600	43.533	
148	Agnes Suto	Iceland	12.766	7.966	11.166	11.200	43.098	
149	Farah Ann Abdul Hadi	Malaysia	12.566	7.675	11.300	11.533	43.074	
150	Asuka Teramoto	Japan	13.966	14.683	14.366	-	43.015	
151	Ichinkhorloo Baatarjav	Mongolia	12.433	9.633	11.600	9.333	42.999	
152	Jaida Lawrence	Jamaica	13.833	7.966	10.333	10.733	42.865	
153	Amelia Racea	Romania	14.400	13.666	14.733	-	42.799	
154	Andrea Camino	Peru	13.433	9.233	9.000	10.966	42.632	
155	Mai Liu Hsiang-Han	Chinese Taipei	12.100	7.800	11.766	10.933	42.599	
156	Diana Chelaru	Romania	14.633	13.533	-	14.233	42.399	
157	Yulia Belokobylskaya	Russia	13.533	-	14.333	14.133	41.999	
158	Yulia Inshina	Russia	-	13.900	14.566	13.433	41.899	
159	Thelma Hermannsdóttir	Iceland	12.700	6.533	11.266	11.133	41.632	
160	Ashleigh Brennan	Australia	13.766	-	14.125	13.600	41.491	
161	Elisabetta Preziosa	Italy	13.500	-	14.208	13.308	41.016	
162	Diana Bulimar	Romania	-	12.433	14.066	14.400	40.899	
163	Imogen Cairns	Great Britain	14.033	-	13.133	13.491	40.657	
164	Mikaela Gerber	Canada	13.566	-	13.200	13.800	40.566	
165	Julie Croket	Belgium	13.466	-	13.500	13.400	40.366	
166	Ana Sarango	Peru	12.200	8.366	10.233	9.566	40.365	
167	Toni-Ann Williams	Jamaica	13.100	3.500	12.908	10.833	40.341	
168	Mary-Anne Monckton	Australia	13.466	12.500	14.166	-	40.132	
169	Chiara Gandolfi	Italy	13.366	13.566	-	12.966	39.898	
170	Clara Della Vedova	France	13.233	13.933	-	12.400	39.566	
171	Silvia Colussi	Spain	-	13.500	12.633	13.366	39.499	
172	Beatriz Cuesta	Spain	13.533	13.400	12.500	-	39.433	
173	Daiane dos Santos	Brazil	13.300	12.016	-	13.758	39.074	
174	Lisa Verschueren	Belgium	-	12.566	13.566	12.766	38.898	
175	Madeline Gardiner	Canada	-	13.066	12.933	12.766	38.765	
176	Yessenia Estrada	Mexico	13.533	-	13.116	12.066	38.715	
177	Alexa Moreno	Mexico	14.633	10.866	-	12.900	38.399	
178	Rose-Eliandre Bellemare	France	13.433	-	11.466	13.233	38.132	
179	Maciel Peña	Venezuela	13.533	-	11.766	12.400	37.699	
180	Yarimar Medina	Venezuela	13.300	12.600	-	11.433	37.333	
181	Adrian Gomes	Brazil	12.800	11.866	12.433	-	37.099	
182	Lieke Wevers	Netherlands	-	11.600	12.533	12.933	37.066	
183	Park Ji-yeon	South Korea	-	11.100	12.100	12.200	35.400	
184	Paula Plichta	Poland	13.633	-	12.033	9.600	35.266	
185	Andriana Syrigou Antoniou	Greece	12.533	10.800	11.891	-	35.224	
186	Aljazy Al-Habshi	Qatar	11.533	7.866	11.433	-	30.832	
187	Tatiana Nabieva	Russia	14.516	14.883	-	-	29.399	
188	Nefy Nurbaeti	Indonesia	-	9.991	9.566	9.716	29.273	
189	Youna Dufournet	France	-	15.066	14.133	-	29.199	
190	Oksana Chusovitina	Germany	15.166	-	13.800	-	28.966	
191	Beth Tweddle	Great Britain	-	14.433	-	14.433	28.866	
192	Larrissa Miller	Australia	-	14.300	-	13.600	27.900	
193	Claudia Menéndez	Spain	14.500	-	-	12.766	27.266	
194	Giorgia Campana	Italy	-	13.533	13.700	-	27.233	
195	Coralie Leblond-Chartrand	Canada	14.100	12.900	-	-	27.000	
196	Antje van de Velde	Belgium	13.066	13.300	-	-	26.366	
197	Priscila Domingues	Brazil	-	-	13.000	12.900	25.900	
198	Yasmin Zimmermann	Switzerland	13.600	-	12.233	-	25.833	
199	Irodahon Sobirova	Uzbekistan	12.866	-	-	12.566	25.432	
200	Becky Downie	Great Britain	0.000	14.233	11.100	-	25.333	
201	Orsolya Nagy	Hungary	13.500	11.433	-	-	24.933	
202	Dipa Karmakar	India	13.433	-	11.266	-	24.699	
203	Pia Tolle	Germany	-	11.533	-	12.966	24.499	
204	Hajnalka Lónai	Hungary	-	-	12.433	12.000	24.433	
205	Sarina Gerber	Switzerland	-	11.533	-	12.000	23.533	
206	Marisela Cantú	Mexico	-	10.733	12.441	-	23.174	
207	Johanny Sotillo	Venezuela	-	10.883	12.066	-	22.949	
208	Dominiqua Belányi	Iceland	-	9.483	12.133	-	21.616	
209	Diana Karimdjanova	Uzbekistan	-	9.233	11.200	-	20.433	
210	Kim Do-young	South Korea	14.300	-	-	-	14.300	
211	Yvette Moshage	Netherlands	13.600	-	-	-	13.600	
212	Yumi Iizuka	Japan	-	-	-	13.166	13.166	
213	He Kexin	China	-	12.733	-	-	12.733	
214	Jana Šikulová	Czech Republic	0.000	-	-	12.333	12.333	
215	Maria Trichopoulou	Greece	-	-	-	12.066	12.066	
216	Sophie McCoo	Ireland	-	-	12.033	-	12.033	

== Vault ==
Rank	Gymnast	Nation	D Score	E Score	Pen.	Score 1	D Score	E Score	Pen.	Score 2	Total	Qual.
Rank	Gymnast	Nation	Vault 1				Vault 2				Total	Qual.
1	McKayla Maroney	United States	6.500	9.033		15.533	5.600	9.033		14.633	15.083	Q
2	Oksana Chusovitina	Germany	6.300	8.866		15.166	5.500	9.000		14.500	14.833	Q
3	Yamilet Peña	Dominican Republic	5.300	8.633		13.933	7.100	7.900		15.000	14.466	Q
4	Giulia Steingruber	Switzerland	6.300	8.566		14.866	5.200	8.533		13.733	14.299	Q
5	Jade Barbosa	Brazil	5.800	8.600		14.400	5.600	8.533		14.133	14.266	Q
6	Alexa Moreno	Mexico	6.300	8.333		14.633	5.200	8.666		13.866	14.249	Q
7	Tatiana Nabieva	Russia	5.800	8.716		14.516	5.200	8.833	0.1	13.933	14.224	Q
8	Phan Thị Hà Thanh	Vietnam	5.900	8.466		14.366	5.300	8.766		14.066	14.216	Q
9	Jo Hyun-joo	South Korea	5.800	8.633		14.433	5.600	8.266		13.866	14.149	R
10	Valeria Maksyuta	Israel	5.800	8.666	0.3	14.166	5.500	8.366		13.866	14.016	R
11	Austin Sheppard	Hungary	5.800	8.833	0.1	14.533	4.800	8.500		13.300	13.916	R

== Uneven bars ==
Rank	Gymnast	Nation	D Score	E Score	Pen.	Total	Qual.
1	Viktoria Komova	Russia	6.700	9.033		15.733	Q
2	Youna Dufournet	France	6.700	8.366		15.066	Q
3	Koko Tsurumi	Japan	6.400	8.533		14.933	Q
4	Huang Qiushuang	China	6.700	8.200		14.900	Q
5	Tatiana Nabieva	Russia	6.400	8.483		14.883	Q
6	Gabby Douglas	United States	6.400	8.466		14.866	Q
7	Jordyn Wieber	United States	6.300	8.500		14.800	Q
8	Asuka Teramoto	Japan	6.300	8.383		14.683	Q
9	Yao Jinnan	China	6.700	7.866		14.566	R
10	Rie Tanaka	Japan	5.800	8.666		14.466	-
11	Yu Minobe	Japan	6.200	8.233		14.433	-
12	Elisabeth Seitz	Germany	6.500	7.933		14.433	R
13	Beth Tweddle	Great Britain	6.600	7.833		14.433	R

== Balance beam ==
Rank	Gymnast	Nation	D Score	E Score	Pen.	Total	Qual.
1	Viktoria Komova	Russia	6.200	9.200		15.400	Q
2	Sui Lu	China	6.400	9.000		15.400	Q
3	Jordyn Wieber	United States	6.200	9.033		15.233	Q
4	Yao Jinnan	China	6.400	8.666		15.066	Q
5	Cătălina Ponor	Romania	6.300	8.700		15.000	Q
6	Aly Raisman	United States	6.300	8.633		14.933	Q
7	Amelia Racea	Romania	6.100	8.633		14.733	Q
8	Huang Qiushuang	China	5.900	8.766		14.666	-
9	Jiang Yuyuan	China	6.000	8.575		14.575	-
10	Yulia Inshina	Russia	5.900	8.666		14.566	Q
11	Raluca Haidu	Romania	6.200	8.333		14.533	-
12	Vasiliki Millousi	Greece	6.000	8.450		14.450	R
13	Hannah Whelan	Great Britain	5.900	8.500		14.400	R
14	Anna Dementyeva	Russia	6.100	8.400	0.1	14.400	-
15	Gabby Douglas	United States	6.200	8.200		14.400	-
16	Ana Porgras	Romania	6.500	7.900		14.400	-
17	Asuka Teramoto	Japan	5.700	8.666		14.366	R

== Floor exercise ==
Rank	Gymnast	Nation	D Score	E Score	Pen.	Total	Qual.
1	Aly Raisman	United States	6.200	8.633		14.833	Q
2	Sui Lu	China	5.900	8.700		14.600	Q
3	Jordyn Wieber	United States	6.000	8.566		14.566	Q
4	Yao Jinnan	China	5.800	8.733		14.533	Q
5	Viktoria Komova	Russia	5.900	8.691	0.1	14.491	Q
6	Vanessa Ferrari	Italy	5.800	8.666		14.466	Q
7	Beth Tweddle	Great Britain	6.100	8.333		14.433	Q
8	Diana Bulimar	Romania	5.800	8.600		14.400	Q
9	Lauren Mitchell	Australia	6.200	8.291	0.1	14.391	R
10	Ksenia Afanasyeva	Russia	5.900	8.425		14.325	R
11	Diana Chelaru	Romania	5.800	8.433		14.233	R
