= Gymnastics at the 2009 European Youth Summer Olympic Festival =

- Venue: Tampere Exhibition and Sports Centre
- Location: (Finland) Tampere
- Dates: 21–24 July 2009

Gymnastics at the 2009 European Youth Summer Olympic Festival (EYOF) was held from 21 to 24 July 2009. The competitions took place at the Tampere Exhibition and Sports Centre in Tampere, Finland.

== Medal summary ==
=== Medal table ===
==== Overall ====
Rank	Nation	Gold	Silver	Bronze	Total
1	Russia	8	2	3	13
2	Great Britain	3	0	1	4
3	Romania	2	6	2	10
4	Belgium	1	1	0	2
5	Switzerland	0	1	4	5
6	Netherlands	0	1	3	4
7	Ukraine	0	1	1	2
8	Bulgaria	0	1	0	1
8	France	0	1	0	1
Totals (9 entries)		14	14	14	42

==== Boys ====
Rank	Nation	Gold	Silver	Bronze	Total
1	Russia (RUS)	4	1	2	7
2	Great Britain (GBR)	3	0	0	3
3	Belgium (BEL)	1	1	0	2
4	Romania (ROU)	0	2	1	3
5	Switzerland (SUI)	0	1	4	5
6	Ukraine (UKR)	0	1	1	2
7	Bulgaria (BUL)	0	1	0	1
7	France (FRA)	0	1	0	1
Totals (8 entries)		8	8	8	24

==== Girls ====
Rank	Nation	Gold	Silver	Bronze	Total
1	Russia (RUS)	4	1	1	6
2	Romania (ROU)	2	4	1	7
3	Netherlands (NED)	0	1	3	4
4	Great Britain (GBR)	0	0	1	1
Totals (4 entries)		6	6	6	18

=== Medal events ===
==== Boys ====
Event	Gold	Silver	Bronze
Team all-around	Russia; Mikhail Andreev; David Belyavskiy; Igor Pakhomenko	Switzerland; Pablo Brägger; Oliver Hegi; Michael Meier	Romania; Adelin Ladislau Kotrong; Andrei Muntean; Nistor Ioan Laurentiu
Individual all-around	David Belyavskiy; Russia	Andrei Muntean; Romania	Igor Pakhomenko; Russia
Floor	David Belyavskiy; Russia	Andrei Muntean; Romania	Pablo Brägger; Switzerland
Pommel horse	Sam Oldham; Great Britain	Igor Pakhomenko; Russia	Maksym Semyankiv; Ukraine
Rings	David Belyavskiy; Russia	Mykyta Yermak; Ukraine	Igor Pakhomenko; Russia
Vault	Tomas Thys; Belgium	Jim Zona; France	Pablo Brägger; Switzerland
Parallel bars	Sam Oldham; Great Britain	Thomas Neuteleers; Belgium	Oliver Hegi; Switzerland
High bar	Maximillian Bennet; Great Britain	Velislav Valchev; Bulgaria	Oliver Hegi; Switzerland

==== Girls ====
Event	Gold	Silver	Bronze
Team all-around	Russia; Viktoria Komova; Violetta Malikova; Tatiana Solovyeva	Romania; Raluca Haidu; Amelia Racea; Diana Trenca	Netherlands; Ouazzani Chahdi Naoual; Lisa van den Burg; Celine van Gerner
Individual all-around	Viktoria Komova; Russia	Amelia Racea; Romania	Celine van Gerner; Netherlands
Vault	Amelia Racea; Romania	Chahdi Naoual Ouazzani; Netherlands	Viktoria Komova; Russia
Uneven bars	Viktoria Komova; Russia	Amelia Racea; Romania	Nicole Hibbert; Great Britain
Balance beam	Amelia Racea; Romania	Viktoria Komova; Russia	Celine van Gerner; Netherlands
Floor	Violetta Malikova; Russia	Amelia Racea; Romania	Raluca Haidu; Romania

== See also ==
- European Youth Olympic Festival
