= Gymnastics at the 2010 Summer Youth Olympics – Women's artistic qualification =

Qualifications for Women's artistic gymnastic competitions at the 2010 Summer Youth Olympics was held at the Bishan Sports Hall on August 17. The results of the qualification determined the qualifiers to the finals: 18 gymnasts in the all-around final, and 8 gymnasts in each of 4 apparatus finals.

The competition was divided to 4 sessions, at 10:00 a.m., 1:30 p.m., 5:00 p.m. and 8:00 p.m.

== Qualification results ==
Gymnast	Vault		Uneven Bars		Balance Beam		Floor Exercise		Total (All-around)	
Gymnast	Score	Rank	Score	Rank	Score	Rank	Score	Rank	Score	Rank
Viktoria Komova (RUS)	15.700	1	15.600	1	15.150	2	14.550	1	61.000	1
Tan Sixin (CHN)	14.150	3	14.500	2	15.500	1	13.950	2	58.100	2
Carlotta Ferlito (ITA)	14.200	2	13.400	6	14.650	3	13.500	4	55.750	3
Diana Bulimar (ROU)	13.750	7	13.850	3	13.150	15	13.950	3	54.700	4
Tess Moonen (NED)	13.800	5	13.800	4	13.450	12	13.200	7	54.250	5
Ana Sofía Gómez (GUA)	13.750	9	12.900	10	14.200	5	13.200	8	54.050	6
Angela Donald (AUS)	13.300	19	13.250	8	14.400	4	13.100	10	54.050	7
Madeline Gardiner (CAN)	13.750	8	13.750	5	13.700	7	12.650	16	53.850	8
Jonna Adlerteg (SWE)	13.400	18	13.350	7	13.600	8	13.250	5	53.600	9
Natsumi Sasada (JPN)	14.000	4	13.200	9	13.550	9	12.800	13	53.550	10
Harumy Freitas (BRA)	13.550	13	12.700	12	13.750	6	13.100	9	53.100	11
Alina Kravchenko (UKR)	13.100	25	12.650	13	13.500	10	12.150	23	51.400	12
Elisa Haemmerle (AUT)	13.450	15	12.150	19	12.750	19	13.000	11	51.350	13
Jessica Hogg (GBR)	13.500	14	11.600	25	12.900	16	13.250	6	51.250	14
Dilnoza Abdusalimova (UZB)	13.100	26	11.900	23	13.500	11	12.700	15	51.200	15
Kosthia Requena (VEN)	13.200	23	12.000	21	13.150	14	12.550	18	50.900	16
María Vargas (ESP)	13.750	6	12.150	20	12.150	31	12.600	17	50.650	17
Park Kyung-jin (KOR)	13.650	11	12.450	16	12.750	20	11.600	33	50.450	18
Bianka Mitykó (HUN)	13.650	10	11.250	27	12.700	21	12.750	14	50.350	19
Nadia Baeriswyl (SUI)	12.900	29	12.300	17	12.600	23	12.450	20	50.250	20
Elisavet Tsakou (GRE)	12.950	28	12.750	11	12.550	24	11.950	27	50.200	21
Demet Mutlu (TUR)	13.400	17	12.000	22	12.450	25	12.100	24	49.950	22
Desiree Baumert (GER)	13.250	21	12.500	15	11.450	35	12.400	21	49.600	23
Azimbay Moldir (KAZ)	12.550	32	12.600	14	12.300	27	11.950	26	49.400	24
Eline Vandersteen (BEL)	13.400	16	11.500	26	12.750	18	11.700	31	49.350	25
Erika Pakkala (FIN)	13.600	12	11.150	29	12.050	33	12.500	19	49.300	26
Claudia Cummins (RSA)	13.100	27	11.200	28	11.900	34	12.800	12	49.000	27
Sophia Serseri (FRA)	13.250	20	10.900	31	12.300	28	12.200	22	48.650	28
F. Verissimo Choon (POR)	13.150	24	10.700	32	12.400	26	12.050	25	48.300	29
Petra Hedbávná (CZE)	12.250	38	11.600	24	12.100	32	11.600	32	47.550	30
Rawiwarn Muaktanod (THA)	12.500	33	9.550	36	12.800	17	11.950	28	46.800	31
Eliana Rodríguez (COL)	12.150	40	11.100	30	12.200	30	10.850	37	46.300	32
Shaden Wohdan (QAT)	12.350	36	10.700	33	12.650	22	10.250	40	45.950	33
Rachel Giam (SIN)	12.650	30	9.150	38	12.250	39	11.800	30	45.850	34
Mai Elsayed (EGY)	12.250	39	10.400	34	11.350	36	11.000	35	45.000	35
Agustina Estarli (ARG)	12.500	34	10.350	35	9.750	40	11.500	34	44.100	36
Batbaataryn Soyolsaikhan (MGL)	11.600	42	9.450	37	10.250	39	10.750	38	42.050	37
Lizaveta Parfionava (BLR)	12.300	37	7.600	40	9.550	42	11.850	29	41.300	38
G. Dominguez Amaya (ESA)	12.400	35	8.200	39	10.450	38	10.150	41	41.200	39
Karla Salazar (MEX)	13.200	22	12.200	18	13.300	13	0.000	42	38.700	40
C. Vilches Arancibia (CHI)	12.600	31	4.250	41	9.700	41	10.550	39	37.100	41
Nardjes Terkmane (ALG)	12.150	41			11.250	37	10.850	36	34.250	42

== Results ==
Results
