= 2010 European Women's Artistic Gymnastics Championships =

28th European Women's Artistic Gymnastics Championships
- Location: Birmingham, England
- Dates: 28 April to 2 May 2010
- Nations: Members of the European Union of Gymnastics

The 28th European Women's Artistic Gymnastics Championships held from 28 April to 2 May 2010 in Birmingham.

== Timetable ==
Date	Time	Event
26 & 27 April		Training
28 April	09.30 – 23.25	Qualifications Juniors
29 April	10.00 – 19.05	Qualifications Seniors
30 April	15.00 – 17.00	Individual Competition Juniors
1 May	15.00 – 17.00	Group Competition Seniors
2 May	10.00 – 11.45	Apparatus Finals Juniors
2 May	15.00 – 16.45	Apparatus Finals Seniors

== Medal winners ==
Event	Gold	Silver	Bronze
Seniors
Team	Russia; Aliya Mustafina; Anna Myzdrikova; Ksenia Semenova; Tatiana Nabieva; Ekaterina Kurbatova	United Kingdom; Becky Downie; Nicole Hibbert; Beth Tweddle; Niamh Rippin; Jocelyn Hunt	Romania; Amelia Racea; Raluca Haidu; Ana Porgras; Diana Chelaru
Vault	(Russia) Ekaterina Kurbatova	(France) Youna Dufournet	(Russia) Tatiana Nabieva
Uneven bars	(United Kingdom) Beth Tweddle	(Russia) Aliya Mustafina	(Ukraine) Natalia Kononenko
Balance beam	(Romania) Amelia Racea	(Russia) Aliya Mustafina	(Romania) Raluca Haidu
Floor	(United Kingdom) Beth Tweddle	(Russia) Anna Myzdrikova	(Romania) Diana Chelaru
Juniors
Team	Russia; Viktoria Komova; Violetta Malikova; Anastasia Grishina; Anastasia Sidorova; Maria Paseka	Romania; Diana Bulimar; Larisa Iordache; Diana Rusu; Beatris Margarit; Madalina Neagu	Italy; Erika Fasana; Carlotta Ferlito; Giulia Leni; Francesca Deagostini
Individual all-around	(Russia) Viktoria Komova	(Russia) Anastasia Grishina	(Romania) Larisa Iordache
Vault	(Russia) Viktoria Komova	(Russia) Maria Paseka	(Italy) Erika Fasana
Uneven bars	(Russia) Anastasia Grishina	(Russia) Viktoria Komova	(Romania) Diana Bulimar
Balance beam	(Russia) Viktoria Komova	(Romania) Larisa Iordache	(Netherlands) Tess Moonen
Floor	(Russia) Anastasia Grishina (Romania) Larisa Iordache	none awarded	(Russia) Anastasia Sidorova

== Detail results ==
=== Seniors ===
==== Team ====
Rank	Team	Vault (gymnastics)	Uneven bars	Balance beam	Floor (gymnastics)	Total
1st place, gold medalist(s)	Russia	43.275 (1)	41.950 (2)	41.875 (1)	42.600 (2)	169.700
1st place, gold medalist(s)	Aliya Mustafina	14.700	14.900	14.175	14.400	169.700
1st place, gold medalist(s)	Anna Myzdrikova	–	–	13.550	14.475	169.700
1st place, gold medalist(s)	Ksenia Semenova	–	–	14.150	13.725	169.700
1st place, gold medalist(s)	Tatiana Nabieva	14.575	13.250	–	–	169.700
1st place, gold medalist(s)	Ekaterina Kurbatova	14.000	13.800	–	–	169.700
2nd place, silver medalist(s)	Great Britain	41.675 (4)	43.775 (1)	40.125 (5)	42.700 (1)	168.275
2nd place, silver medalist(s)	Rebecca Downie	14.075	14.350	14.100	–	168.275
2nd place, silver medalist(s)	Nicole Hibbert	13.900	13.575	12.925	–	168.275
2nd place, silver medalist(s)	Elizabeth Tweddle	–	15.850	–	14.925	168.275
2nd place, silver medalist(s)	Niamh Rippin	–	–	13.100	14.350	168.275
2nd place, silver medalist(s)	Jocelyn Hunt	13.700	–	–	13.425	168.275
3rd place, bronze medalist(s)	Romania	41.975 (2)	40.825 (3)	41.000 (2)	41.175 (3)	164.975
3rd place, bronze medalist(s)	Amelia Racea	14.100	13.975	14.100	13.650	164.975
3rd place, bronze medalist(s)	Raluca Haidu	13.625	13.150	12.100	13.325	164.975
3rd place, bronze medalist(s)	Ana Porgras	–	13.700	14.800‡	–	164.975
3rd place, bronze medalist(s)	Diana Chelaru	14.250	–	–	14.200	164.975
4	France	41.750 (3)	40.125 (4)	40.875 (4)	40.825 (4)	163.575
4	Youna Dufournet	14.200	13.725	14.625	13.775	163.575
4	Pauline Morel	13.725	13.275	12.800	13.225	163.575
4	Marine Brevet	–	–	13.450	13.825	163.575
4	Aurélie Malaussena	13.825	13.125	–	–	163.575
5	Italy	40.950 (7)	39.475 (5)	40.900 (3)	40.350 (5)	161.675
5	Vanessa Ferrari	13.650	13.825	14.100	13.950	161.675
5	Elisabetta Preziosa	13.725	12.600	12.900	13.075	161.675
5	Paola Galante	–	13.050	13.900	–	161.675
5	Federica Macrì	13.575	–	–	13.325	161.675
6	Switzerland	41.250 (6)	39.100 (6)	38.250 (7)	37.575 (8)	156.175
6	Giulia Steingruber	13.825	12.850	11.875	12.475	156.175
6	Ariella Käslin	14.350	13.475	14.050	–	156.175
6	Jessica Diacci	13.075	–	12.325	13.250	156.175
6	Jennifer Senn	–	12.775	–	11.850	156.175
7	Netherlands	40.525 (8)	37.250 (7)	38.975 (6)	39.250 (7)	156.000
7	Céline van Gerner	–	13.475	13.925	12.975	156.000
7	Wyomi Masela	13.575	12.550	–	13.125	156.000
7	Mayra Kroonen	13.525	–	12.025	13.150	156.000
7	Yvette Moshage	13.425	11.225	–	–	156.000
7	Sanne Wevers	–	–	13.025	–	156.000
8	Ukraine	41.600 (5)	36.550 (8)	36.875 (8)	40.350 (5)	155.375
8	Valentyna Holenkova	13.925	–	12.025	13.525	155.375
8	Alina Fomenko	14.100	8.225	–	13.225	155.375
8	Nataliya Kononenko	–	14.625	12.600	–	155.375
8	Angelina Kysla	13.575	–	–	13.600	155.375
8	Yana Demyanchuk	–	13.700	12.250	–	155.375

‡ Romania's Ana Porgras injured herself on her dismount on beam. However, despite injury, she still competed on bars and scored 13.7.

==== Vault ====
Rank	Gymnast	D Score	E Score	Pen.	Score 1	D Score	E Score	Pen.	Score 2	Total
1st place, gold medalist(s)	Ekaterina Kurbatova (RUS)	5.800	8.675		14.475	5.600	8.500		14.100	14.287
2nd place, silver medalist(s)	Youna Dufournet (FRA)	5.300	8.900		14.200	5.600	8.750		14.350	14.275
3rd place, bronze medalist(s)	Tatiana Nabieva (RUS)	5.800	8.625		14.425	5.200	8.675		13.875	14.150
4	Diana Chelaru (ROU)	5.800	8.575		14.375	5.300	8.450		13.750	14.062
5	Ariella Käslin (SUI)	6.300	8.125		14.425	5.300	8.225		13.525	13.975
6	Renata Tóth (HUN)	5.300	8.175		13.475	5.500	8.425		13.925	13.700
7	Amelia Racea (ROU)	5.800	8.275		14.075	5.000	8.250		13.250	13.662
8	Nicole Hibbert (GBR)	5.300	8.200		13.500	5.200	7.350		12.550	13.025
Rank	Gymnast	Vault 1				Vault 2				Total

==== Uneven Bars ====
Rank	Gymnast	D Score	E Score	Pen.	Total
1st place, gold medalist(s)	Elizabeth Tweddle (GBR)	6.800	9.075		15.875
2nd place, silver medalist(s)	Aliya Mustafina (RUS)	6.700	8.350		15.050
3rd place, bronze medalist(s)	Nataliya Kononenko (UKR)	6.400	8.350		14.750
4	Tatiana Nabieva (RUS)	6.400	8.275		14.675
5	Rebecca Downie (GBR)	6.100	8.525		14.625
6	Youna Dufournet (FRA)	6.800	8.150	0.5	14.450
7	Vanessa Ferrari (ITA)	5.800	8.350		14.150
8	Elisabeth Seitz (GER)	5.900	8.100		14.000

==== Balance Beam ====
Rank	Gymnast	D Score	E Score	Pen.	Total
1st place, gold medalist(s)	Amelia Racea (ROU)	6.200	8.200		14.400
2nd place, silver medalist(s)	Aliya Mustafina (RUS)	6.000	8.375		14.375
3rd place, bronze medalist(s)	Raluca Haidu (ROU)	5.800	8.150		13.950
4	Céline van Gerner (NED)	5.500	8.350		13.850
5	Anna Myzdrikova (RUS)	5.500	7.650		13.150
6	Elisabetta Preziosa (ITA)	5.700	7.375		13.075
7	Yana Demyanchuk (UKR)	5.900	7.000		12.900
8	Valentyna Holenkova (UKR)	5.600	6.925		12.525

==== Floor ====
Rank	Gymnast	D Score	E Score	Pen.	Total
1st place, gold medalist(s)	Elizabeth Tweddle (GBR)	6.200	8.625		14.825
2nd place, silver medalist(s)	Anna Myzdrikova (RUS)	5.900	8.425		14.325
3rd place, bronze medalist(s)	Diana Chelaru (ROU)	6.000	8.225	0.1	14.125
4	Vanessa Ferrari (ITA)	5.400	8.450		13.850
5	Amelia Racea (ROU)	5.500	8.200		13.700
6	Niamh Rippin (GBR)	5.800	7.700	0.1	13.400
6	Marine Brevet (FRA)	5.300	8.200	0.1	13.400
8	Aliya Mustafina (RUS)	5.700	7.525		13.225

=== Juniors ===
==== Team ====
Rank	Team	Vault (gymnastics)	Uneven bars	Balance beam	Floor (gymnastics)	Total
1st place, gold medalist(s)	Russia	44.025 (1)	42.625 (1)	43.650 (1)	43.450 (1)	173.750
1st place, gold medalist(s)	Anastasia Grishina	13.925	15.250	14.275	14.550	173.750
1st place, gold medalist(s)	Viktoria Komova	14.825	13.450	14.625	14.150	173.750
1st place, gold medalist(s)	Maria Paseka	14.850	13.925	12.675	14.400	173.750
1st place, gold medalist(s)	Anastasia Sidorova	14.350	12.000	14.750	14.500	173.750
1st place, gold medalist(s)	Violetta Malikova	13.475	12.500	13.875	13.650	173.750
2nd place, silver medalist(s)	Romania	41.075 (3)	39.575 (4)	40.775 (2)	43.275 (2)	164.700
2nd place, silver medalist(s)	Larisa Iordache	13.875	13.275	13.625	14.775	164.700
2nd place, silver medalist(s)	Diana Bulimar	13.250	13.650	13.200	14.425	164.700
2nd place, silver medalist(s)	Diana Rusu	13.575	9.925	13.150	13.600	164.700
2nd place, silver medalist(s)	Beatris Margarit	13.625	–	12.850	14.075	164.700
2nd place, silver medalist(s)	Mădălina Neagu	–	12.650	13.950	–	164.700
3rd place, bronze medalist(s)	Italy	40.475 (5)	39.750 (3)	40.275 (3)	40.950 (3)	161.450
3rd place, bronze medalist(s)	Erika Fasana	13.625	13.400	13.400	13.900	161.450
3rd place, bronze medalist(s)	Carlotta Ferlito	13.525	12.950	14.050	13.200	161.450
3rd place, bronze medalist(s)	Giulia Leni	13.325	13.375	12.450	13.500	161.450
3rd place, bronze medalist(s)	Francesca Deagostini	12.175	12.975	12.825	13.550	161.450
4	France	40.725 (4)	40.575 (2)	39.400 (4)	40.650 (4)	161.350
4	Natalia Zolotaryov	13.275	13.725	13.575	13.450	161.350
4	Anne Kuhm	13.525	13.325	12.900	13.250	161.350
4	Mira Boumejmajen	12.950	13.525	12.925	13.375	161.350
4	Doriane Thobie	13.225	12.850	11.500	13.825	161.350
4	Sophia Serseri	13.925	12.450	10.275	12.900	161.350
5	Great Britain	40.125 (6)	37.400 (7)	39.125 (5)	39.675 (8)	156.325
5	Leilah MacKenzie	12.950	12.500	13.500	12.675	156.325
5	Laura Mitchell	13.250	12.050	12.825	13.050	156.325
5	Ruby Harrold	13.550	10.750	12.800	13.500	156.325
5	Rebecca Tunney	13.325	12.850	12.050	12.375	156.325
5	Jessica Hogg	13.150	11.575	12.425	13.125	156.325
6	Netherlands	39.350 (10)	37.675 (6)	38.725 (6)	39.900 (6)	155.650
6	Tess Moonen	13.100	12.350	14.175	13.200	155.650
6	Lisa Top	13.225	12.575	11.825	13.800	155.650
6	Tessa Gerrits	13.025	12.750	12.725	12.900	155.650
6	Melissa Scherpenisse	13.025	11.675	11.600	12.550	155.650
6	Ayla Wilbrink	13.000	11.275	11.600	12.900	155.650
7	Switzerland	39.850 (8)	38.475 (5)	37.775 (10)	39.200 (9)	155.300
7	Sara Catanzaro	13.300	13.200	12.250	13.375	155.300
7	Nadia Mülhauser	13.125	13.000	11.900	12.800	155.300
7	Nadia Bäriswyl	12.750	12.275	12.775	12.725	155.300
7	Sarah Di Lascia	13.425	11.525	12.525	12.700	155.300
7	Sara Metzger	13.075	11.300	12.475	13.025	155.300
8	Germany	39.500 (9)	36.625 (11)	38.450 (8)	40.325 (5)	154.900
8	Janine Berger	13.800	12.100	12.625	13.150	154.900
8	Désirée Baumert	11.675	12.125	13.325	13.859	154.900
8	Isabelle Marquard	12.825	12.400	12.350	13.325	154.900
8	Katja Roll	12.550	11.675	12.500	12.900	154.900
8	Rosa Lynn Schmitz	12.875	10.225	11.775	12.075	154.900

- The junior team competition also served as qualification for the all-around and individual event finals. The 8 highest-ranked teams are shown here; the other sixteen teams were Spain, Ukraine, Belgium, Sweden, Greece, Hungary, Belarus, Israel, Finland, Croatia, Czech Republic, Ireland, Austria, Norway, Turkey and Iceland.

==== All-Around ====
Oldest and youngest competitors

	Name	Country	Date of birth	Age
Youngest	Anne Kuhm	France	17/12/96	13 years
Oldest	Laura Mitchell	United Kingdom	03/01/95	15 years

Rank	Gymnast	Vault (gymnastics)	Uneven bars	Balance beam	Floor (gymnastics)	Total
1st place, gold medalist(s)	Viktoria Komova (RUS)	14.525	15.325	14.100	14.425	58.375
2nd place, silver medalist(s)	Anastasia Grishina (RUS)	13.950	15.225	13.400	14.375	56.950
3rd place, bronze medalist(s)	Larisa Iordache (ROU)	13.650	13.150	14.675	14.200	55.675
4	Diana Laura Bulimar (ROU)	13.125	12.575	14.150	14.325	54.175
5	Erika Fasana (ITA)	13.925	13.300	12.250	13.450	52.925
6	Anne Kuhm (FRA)	13.400	13.325	12.700	13.350	52.775
7	Lisa Top (NED)	13.100	13.200	12.700	13.525	52.525
8	Carlotta Ferlito (ITA)	13.475	12.550	12.675	13.500	52.200
9	Tess Moonen (NED)	13.075	13.625	12.600	12.850	52.150
10	Natalia Zolotaryov (FRA)	13.050	13.350	12.300	13.400	52.100
11	Jonna Adlerteg (SWE)	13.325	13.250	12.700	12.675	51.950
12	Krystyna Sankova (UKR)	13.325	12.275	12.600	13.525	51.725
13	Darina Liubytska (UKR)	13.350	13.050	12.125	12.975	51.500
14	Laura Mitchell (GBR)	13.450	12.675	11.950	13.125	51.200
15	Nadia Mülhauser (SUI)	13.375	12.925	11.575	12.875	50.750
16	Janine Berger (GER)	13.575	12.325	12.050	12.600	50.550
17	Leilah MacKenzie (GBR)	13.525	12.825	11.200	12.875	50.425
18	Maria Paula Vargas (ESP)	13.600	12.125	12.175	11.800	49.700
19	Désirée Baumert (GER)	12.825	11.600	12.225	12.775	49.425
19	Nadia Bäriswyl (SUI)	12.775	11.950	11.975	12.725	49.425
21	Dorina Jelencsics (HUN)	13.175	11.250	12.150	12.425	49.000
22	Anabel Laura Ruíz Walker (ESP)	13.250	11.925	10.175	12.750	48.100
23	Elisavet Tsakou (GRE)	12.175	11.450	11.975	12.225	47.825
24	Eline Vandersteen (BEL)	11.650	10.800	12.425	11.525	46.400

==== Vault ====
Oldest and youngest competitors

	Name	Country	Date of birth	Age
Youngest	Larisa Iordache	Romania	19/06/96	13 years
Oldest	Viktoria Komova	Russia	30/01/95	15 years

Rank	Gymnast	D Score	E Score	Pen.	Score 1	D Score	E Score	Pen.	Score 2	Total
1st place, gold medalist(s)	Viktoria Komova (RUS)	6.500	8.700		15.200	5.800	8.900		14.700	14.950
2nd place, silver medalist(s)	Maria Paseka (RUS)	5.800	8.700		14.500	5.300	8.750		14.050	14.275
3rd place, bronze medalist(s)	Erika Fasana (ITA)	5.800	8.250		14.050	5.300	8.475		13.775	13.912
4	Larisa Iordache (ROU)	5.000	8.625		13.625	5.300	8.800		14.100	13.862
5	Janine Berger (GER)	5.000	8.600		13.600	5.200	8.400		13.600	13.600
6	Diana Rusu (ROU)	5.000	8.725		13.725	4.600	8.650		13.250	13.487
7	Maria Paula Vargas (ESP)	4.400	8.750		13.150	5.000	8.800		13.800	13.475
8	Sophia Serseri (FRA)	5.300	7.400		12.700	5.000	7.375		12.375	12.537
Rank	Gymnast	Vault 1				Vault 2				Total

==== Uneven Bars ====
Oldest and youngest competitors

	Name	Country	Date of birth	Age
Youngest	Erika Fasana	Italy	17/02/96	14 years
Oldest	Viktoria Komova	Russia	30/01/95	15 years

Rank	Gymnast	D Score	E Score	Pen.	Total
1st place, gold medalist(s)	Anastasia Grishina (RUS)	6.500	8.875		15.375
2nd place, silver medalist(s)	Viktoria Komova (RUS)	6.500	8.700		15.200
3rd place, bronze medalist(s)	Diana Bulimar (ROU)	5.400	8.175		13.575
4	Jonna Adlerteg (SWE)	5.000	8.125		13.125
5	Natalia Zolotaryov (FRA)	5.100	7.425		12.525
6	Mira Boumejmajen (FRA)	5.200	7.175		12.375
7	Giulia Leni (ITA)	5.300	6.775		12.075
8	Erika Fasana (ITA)	4.500	7.075		11.575

==== Balance Beam ====
Oldest and youngest competitors

	Name	Country	Date of birth	Age
Youngest	Anastasia Sidorova	Russia	28/09/96	13 years
Oldest	Viktoria Komova	Russia	30/01/95	15 years

Rank	Gymnast	D Score	E Score	Pen.	Total
1st place, gold medalist(s)	Viktoria Komova (RUS)	5.800	9.100		14.900
2nd place, silver medalist(s)	Larisa Iordache (ROU)	6.000	8.575		14.575
3rd place, bronze medalist(s)	Tess Moonen (NED)	5.700	8.275		13.975
4	Leilah MacKenzie (GBR)	5.300	8.125		13.425
5	Anastasia Sidorova (RUS)	6.000	7.375		13.375
6	Mădălina Neagu (ROU)	5.700	7.450		13.150
7	Natalia Zolotaryov (FRA)	5.400	7.250		12.650
8	Carlotta Ferlito (ITA)	5.300	7.200		12.500

==== Floor ====
Oldest and youngest competitors

	Name	Country	Date of birth	Age
Youngest	Lisa Top	Netherlands	13/08/96	13 years
Oldest	Viktoria Komova	Russia	30/01/95	15 years

Rank	Gymnast	D Score	E Score	Pen.	Total
1st place, gold medalist(s)	Anastasia Grishina (RUS)	5.500	8.775		14.275
1st place, gold medalist(s)	Larisa Iordache (ROU)	5.800	8.475		14.275
3rd place, bronze medalist(s)	Anastasia Sidorova (RUS)	5.700	8.500		14.200
4	Diana Laura Bulimar (ROU)	5.500	8.675		14.175
5	Doriane Thobie (FRA)	5.200	8.725		13.925
6	Erika Fasana (ITA)	5.300	8.475	0.1	13.675
7	Lisa Top (NED)	5.200	8.400		13.600
8	Désirée Baumert (GER)	5.400	8.150	0.3	13.250

== Medal count ==
=== Combined ===
Rank	Nation	Gold	Silver	Bronze	Total
1	Russia	8	6	2	16
2	Romania	2	2	5	9
3	Great Britain	2	1	0	3
4	France	0	1	0	1
5	Italy	0	0	2	2
6	Netherlands	0	0	1	1
6	Ukraine	0	0	1	1
Totals (7 entries)		12	10	11	33

=== Seniors ===
Rank	Nation	Gold	Silver	Bronze	Total
1	Russia	2	3	1	6
2	Great Britain	2	1	0	3
3	Romania	1	0	3	4
4	France	0	1	0	1
5	Ukraine	0	0	1	1
Totals (5 entries)		5	5	5	15

=== Juniors ===
Rank	Nation	Gold	Silver	Bronze	Total
1	Russia	6	3	1	10
2	Romania	1	2	2	5
3	Italy	0	0	2	2
4	Netherlands	0	0	1	1
Totals (4 entries)		7	5	6	18
