= Raluca Haidu =

Romanian gymnast

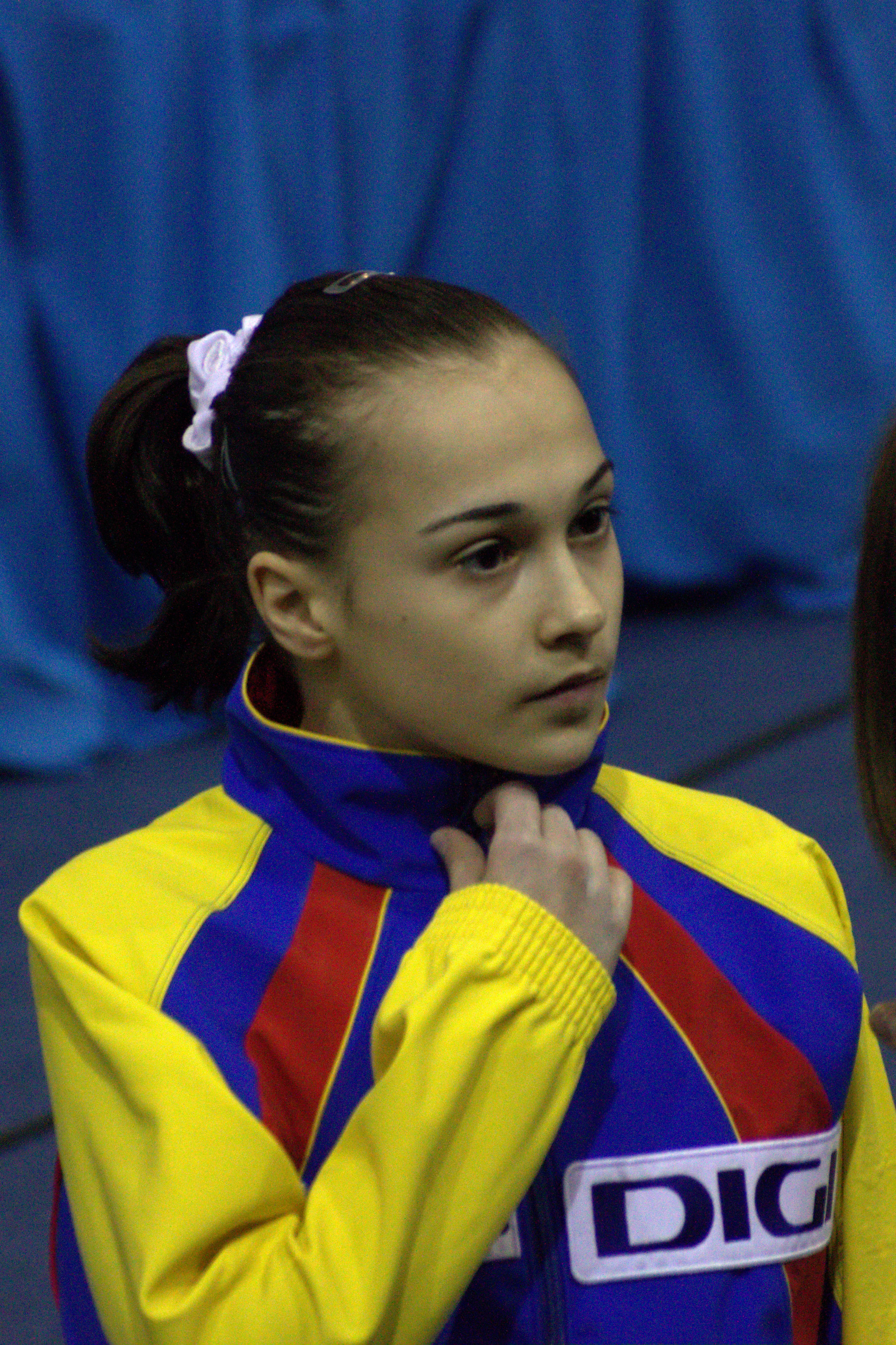

Personal information
- Full name: Raluca Oana Haidu
- Nickname: Pitic
- Born: 20 November 1994 (age 31) Petroşani

Gymnastics career
- Discipline: Women's artistic gymnastics
- Country represented: Romania
- Club: CSS Deva
- Head coaches: Octavian Bellu, Mariana Bitang
- Assistant coaches: Raluca Bugner, Lucian Sandu, Mircea Vintila
- Former coaches: Ramona Micu, Florin Cotutiu, Nicolae Forminte, Liliana Cozma
- Choreographer: Mariana Ristea, Puia Valer
Medal record
European Championships
Gold medal – first place	2012 Brussels	Team
Bronze medal – third place	2010 Birmingham	Team
Bronze medal – third place	2010 Birmingham	Balance Beam
World Cup
Bronze medal – third place	2011 Glasgow	All-Around

Raluca Haidu (born 20 November 1994 in Petroşani, Romania) is a Romanian artistic gymnast. She is a European gold (2012) and bronze (2010) medallist with the team. Individually, she is a European bronze medallist on beam. She also placed fourth with the team and ninth in the women's all around at the 2010 World Championships.

== Early life and career ==
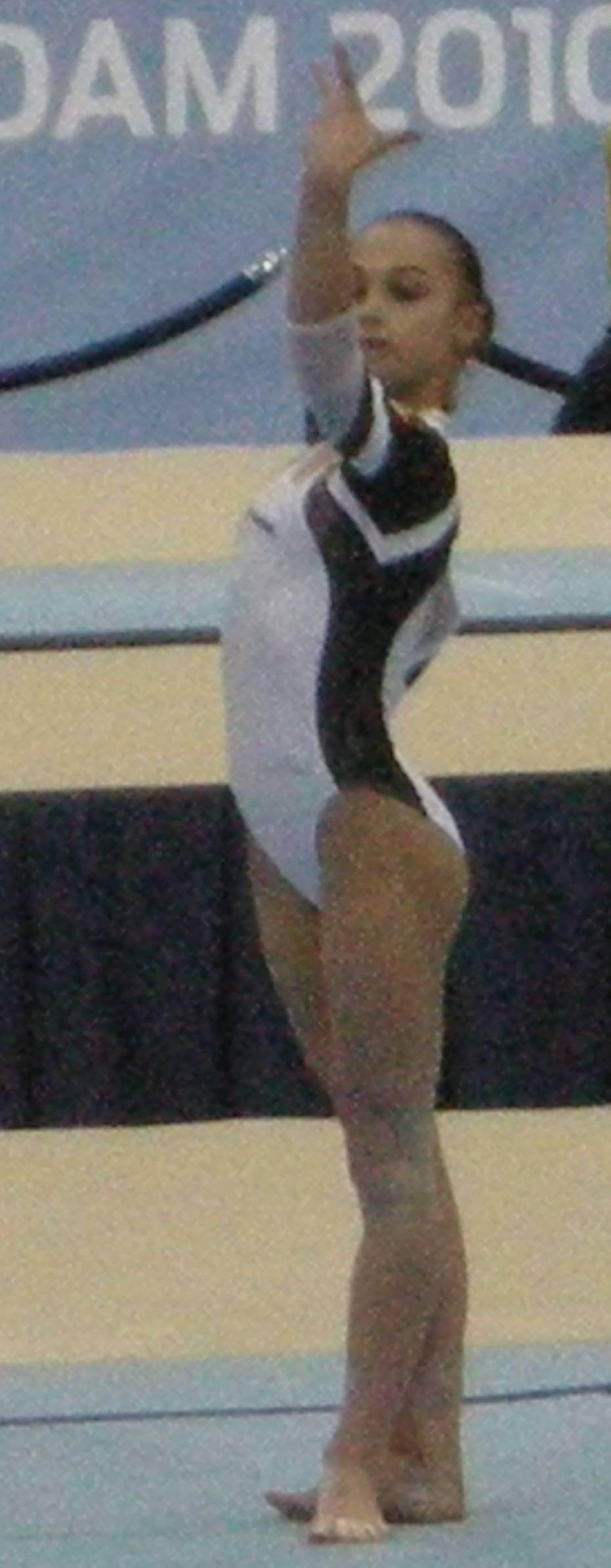
Raluca Haidu on floor.

Haidu started to train for gymnastics at CSS Deva sports club. She was one of the main characters of a 2004 TV documentary ("The secret of Deva") about the life of gymnasts in Deva's famous sports boarding school. This documentary, directed by Anca Miruna Lazarescu, received several awards at prestigious international film festivals. Haidu had a promising junior career medaling at various international competitions. For example, she won bronze on floor and silver with the team at the 10th European Youth Olympic Festival.

== Senior career ==
=== 2010 ===
Haidu's senior debut at a major international event was at the 2010 European Championships. Here she contributed to the team bronze medal by competing on all four events. Individually, she won bronze on balance beam. In October she was selected in the national team to compete at the 2010 World Championships. Here she helped her team qualify in the fourth position by competing on all four events (balance beam, vault, beam and uneven bars). Individually, she qualified in the all around event (12th place). She ended her first world championships experience by placing fourth with the team and ninth all around.

=== 2011 ===
In the spring of 2011, Haidu was not selected in the team for the European Championships, but competed at some international meets. At the 2011 Glasgow World Cup, Haidu won the all around bronze after teammate Amelia Racea (gold) and Jessica López (silver) and won the Brno mixed-pair event together with Cristian Bățagă. In August 2011 she had a good showing at the Romanian Championships where she won the all-around bronze behind Ana Porgras and Amelia Racea, and silver on vault and uneven bars. She was then selected to the Romanian team for the 2011 World Championships in Tokyo. Here she helped the team to qualify (and finish in) fourth place; the top-eight finish secured the team a place at the 2012 Summer Olympics. Individually, Haidu qualified in 10th place for the all around final, but in the final she placed 18th after a fall on vault.

=== 2012 ===
After good performances at some international friendly meets, she was selected over teammate Diana Chelaru in the Romanian team for the 2012 European Championships. Here she contributed to the team gold by competing only on uneven bars.
