= Toni-Ann Williams =

Jamaican American artistic gymnast

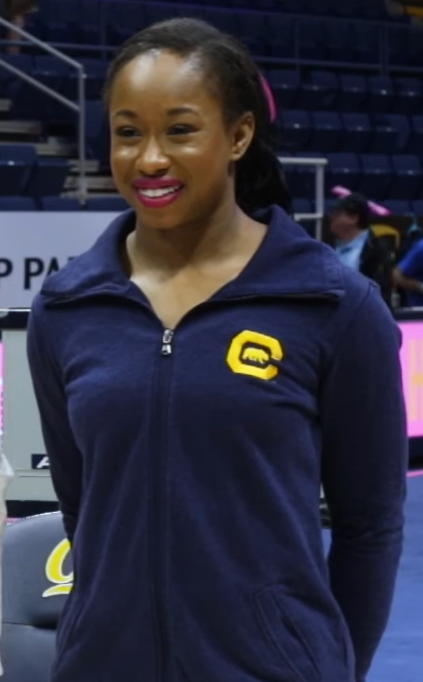

Personal information
- Full name: Toni-Ann Natasha Williams
- Born: November 20, 1995 (age 30) Randallstown, Maryland, U.S.
- Height: 1.54 m (5 ft 1 in)

Gymnastics career
- Discipline: Women's artistic gymnastics
- Country represented: Jamaica; (2010-2016)
- College team: California Golden Bears (Class of 2018)
- Club: United Gymnastix
- Head coach: Justin Howell
- Assistant coach: Lisa Howell
- Retired: May 30, 2018

Toni-Ann Natasha Williams (born November 20, 1995) is a Jamaican American artistic gymnast that competed in college gymnastics for the Cal Bears women's gymnastics team. She has also been a member of the Jamaica national gymnastics team since 2010. She was the first gymnast to ever represent Jamaica in international competition. She is the inaugural Jamaican gymnast to compete in the Olympics, in 2016.

== Personal life ==
Williams was born in Maryland on November 20, 1995, to parents, Tony and Marlene Williams. As her parents are both from Jamaica, Williams is eligible to compete for that country in FIG international competitions. Through her mother, Williams is a niece of Jamaican politician Anthony Hylton.

She grew up in Randallstown, Maryland, attended Greenspring Montessori School for eleven years, and graduated from Roland Park Country School in 2014. She graduated from the University of California, Berkeley and was a member of the Golden Bears gymnastics team.

Williams has three sisters, Maya, Kristine and Zitafa. Her sister, Maya, is also a gymnast on the Jamaica National team.

== Club career ==
Williams trained at United Gymnastix in Reisterstown, Maryland, throughout her whole club career. She moved up to Level 10 in 2009 and joined the Jamaica national gymnastics team in 2010.

In 2011, she was State and Regional Champion and competed in her first international competition, the 2011 World Artistic Gymnastics Championships in Tokyo, Japan.

She was hoping to qualify to the 2012 Olympics, but was unable to, because she did not meet requirements at the 2011 Worlds. In 2012, she was again crowned State Champion.

Williams represented Jamaica at her second World Championships in 2013, in Antwerp, Belgium.

In 2014, Williams was State Champion for the fourth time in her Level 10 career.

== College career ==
Williams' first season in the NCAA was during the 2015 season for the California Bears.

=== 2015 season: Freshman ===
Williams quickly became one of Cal's top gymnasts to ever compete in the program, even in her freshman season. On February 13, 2015, during a regular season meet against Oregon State, she broke the school record on vault, scoring a 9.975.

During the regular season, she peaked at #1 nationally on floor on February 23, 2015 and has reached as high as #5 nationally on vault (on March 2, 2015). She qualified to the 2015 NCAA Women's Gymnastics Championships as an individual all-arounder.

=== 2016 season: Sophomore ===
Williams became Cal's first individual event champion at the Pac-12 Championships (3/19) since 2004, winning floor with a 9.925. She was twice named Pac-12 Gymnast of the Week and was 1st team All-Pac-12 for floor and vault.

She missed the NCAA Championships to compete at the Rio Olympic Test Event, where she became the first Jamaican gymnast to qualify for the Olympics.

=== 2017 season: Junior ===
Williams tore her Achilles tendon in week 5 and missed the rest of the season.

=== 2018 season: Senior ===
Williams returned from injury to lead the Bears in 2018. She took third on vault and beam at the Pac-12 Championships. The Bears finished ninth in the NCAA Women's Gymnastics Championship with Williams coming seventh in the all-around. She was named an NCAA All-Around Second Team All-American.

=== 2019 season: Fifth-year senior ===
Williams ruptured her Achilles on February 17, ending her season and collegiate career. She was named a finalist for the AAI Award.

== 2016 Olympics bid ==
In February 2015, it was announced that she and British Jamaican gymnast and UCLA gymnast, Danusia Francis, would represent Jamaica at the 2015 World Artistic Gymnastics Championships, the primary qualification event for the 2016 Olympics in Rio de Janeiro.

At the World Championships, Francis recorded the higher all-around score and earned Jamaica a place at the 2016 Gymnastics Olympic Test Event.

Williams subsequently represented Jamaica at the Test Event, where she secured an Olympic berth for the country, and was selected to compete at the 2016 Summer Olympics in Rio de Janeiro.

At the 2016 Summer Olympics, Williams competed in the women's all-around qualification round. She finished 54th and last among the gymnasts who completed the competition, after falls and missteps during her routines, and did not advance to the all-around final.

== Competitive history ==
Competitive history of Toni-Ann Williams
| Year | Event | Team | AA | VT | UB | BB | FX |
Senior
| 2011 | World Championships | | 167 | | | | |
| 2013 | World Championships | | 45 | 38 | 77 | 49 | 37 |
| 2015 | World Championships | | 93 | 63 | 180 | 91 | 102 |
| 2016 | 2016 Gymnastics Olympic Test Event | | 38 | | | | |
| 2016 | Olympic Games | | 54 | 19 | 78 | 73 | 51 |
NCAA
| 2015 | Pac-12 Championships | 6 | 6 | | | | |
| 2015 | NCAA Championships | | 20 | 44 | 63 | 58 | 36 |
| 2016 | Pac-12 Championships | 4 | | | | | 1 |
| 2018 | Pac-12 Championships | 3 | | 3 | 7 | 3 | 3 |
| 2018 | NCAA Championships | 9 | 7 | | | | |
