= Diana Chelaru =

Romanian artistic gymnast

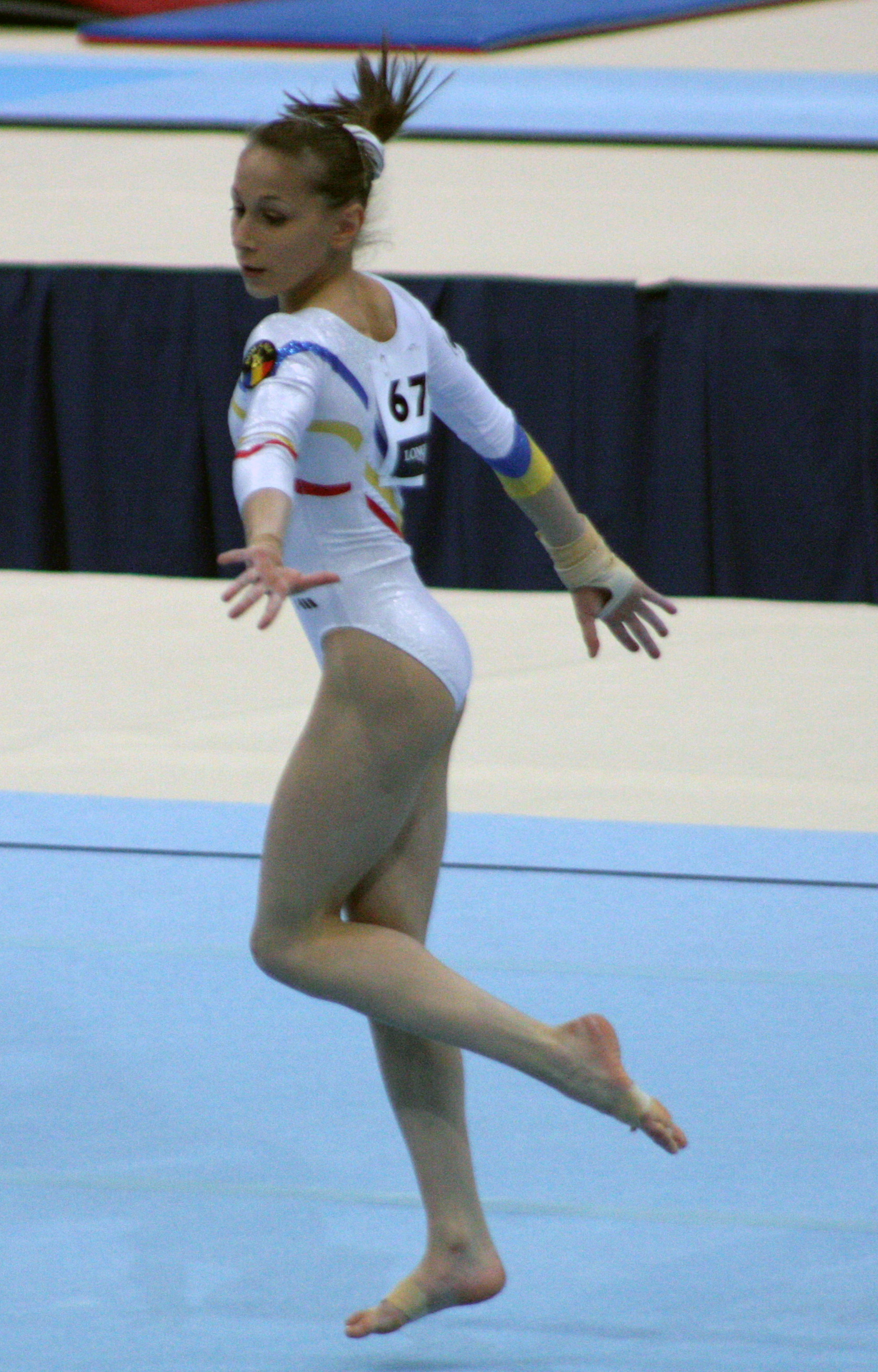
- Chelaru at the 2010 World Artistic Gymnastics Championships

Personal information
- Full name: Diana Maria Chelaru
- Born: 15 August 1993 (age 33) Oneşti, Romania

Gymnastics career
- Discipline: Women's artistic gymnastics
- Country represented: Romania
- Club: CSS Oneşti
- Head coaches: Octavian Bellu, Mariana Bitang
- Assistant coaches: Liliana Cozma, Lucian Sandu, Mircea Vintila
- Former coach: Nicolae Forminte
- Choreographer: Puia Valer
- Retired: January 14, 2013
Medal record
Representing Romania
Olympic Games
Bronze medal – third place	2012 London	Team
World Championships
Silver medal – second place	2010 Rotterdam	Floor Exercise
European Championships
Silver medal – second place	2011 Berlin	Floor Exercise
Bronze medal – third place	2010 Birmingham	Team
Bronze medal – third place	2010 Birmingham	Floor Exercise
World Cup
Gold medal – first place	2012 Cottbus	Floor Exercise
Silver medal – second place	2010 Ghent	Vault
Silver medal – second place	2011 Paris	Floor Exercise
Bronze medal – third place	2011 Paris	Vault

Diana Maria Chelaru (Romanian pronunciation: [diˈana keˈlaru]; born 15 August 1993) is a Romanian artistic gymnast who competed at the 2012 Summer Olympics.

== Early gymnastics career ==
Chelaru started to train for gymnastics at CSS Oneşti Club with coaches Elena Dragomir, Octavian Teodoru and Ioana Dragomir. In 2005, she joined the junior national team where she trained with coaches Aurica Nistor, Lacramioara Moldovan, Cristian Moldovan, Carmen Bogasiu, Ingrid Istrate and Daniel Nistor. She moved to Deva National Training Center in 2008.

== Senior career ==
=== 2009 ===
In April, Chelaru competed at the 2009 European Artistic Gymnastics Championships in Milan, Italy. She placed fourteenth in the all around final with a score of 54.500.

In October, Chelaru competed at the 2009 World Artistic Gymnastics Championships in London, United Kingdom. She placed fifteenth on vault scoring 13.562 and fifteenth on floor scoring 13.475.

=== 2010 ===
In April, Chelaru competed at the 2010 European Women's Artistic Gymnastics Championships Birmingham, United Kingdom. She contributed scores of 14.250 on vault and 14.20 on floor toward the Romanian team's third-place finish. In event finals, she placed fourth on vault scoring 14.062 and third on floor scoring 14.125.

In September, Chelaru competed at the Artistic Gymnastics World Cup event in Ghent, Germany. She placed second on vault scoring 13.750 and fifth on floor scoring 13.275.

Later in September, Chelaru competed at the Romanian National Championships in Resita, Romania. She placed second in the all around competition with a score of 56.700.

In October, Chelaru competed at the 2010 World Artistic Gymnastics Championships in Rotterdam, The Netherlands. She contributed scores of 14.600 on vault, 14.000 on uneven bars, and 14.466 on floor towards the Romanian team's fourth-place finish. In event finals, she placed seventh on vault scoring 14.066 and second on floor scoring 14.766.

=== 2011 ===
Chelaru performing on floor at the 2011 Artistic Gymnastics World Cup in Paris, France

In March, Chelaru competed at the Artistic Gymnastics World Cup in Paris, France. She placed third on vault scoring 14.633 and second on floor scoring 14.017.

In April, Chelaru competed at the 2011 European Artistic Gymnastics Championships in Berlin, Germany. She placed fourth in the all around final with a score of 56.325 and second on floor exercise with a score of 14.475.

In October, Chelaru competed at the 2011 World Artistic Gymnastics Championships in Tokyo, Japan. She contributed scores of 14.566 on vault and 14.233 on floor toward the Romanian team's fourth-place finish. Individually, she placed eighth in the floor final with a score of 14.200.

=== 2012 ===
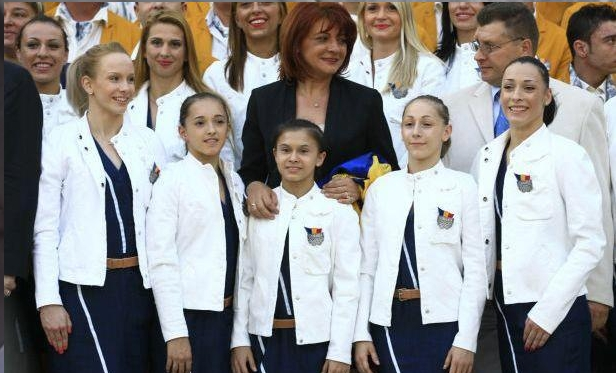
Chelaru with the 2012 Olympic Romanian team.

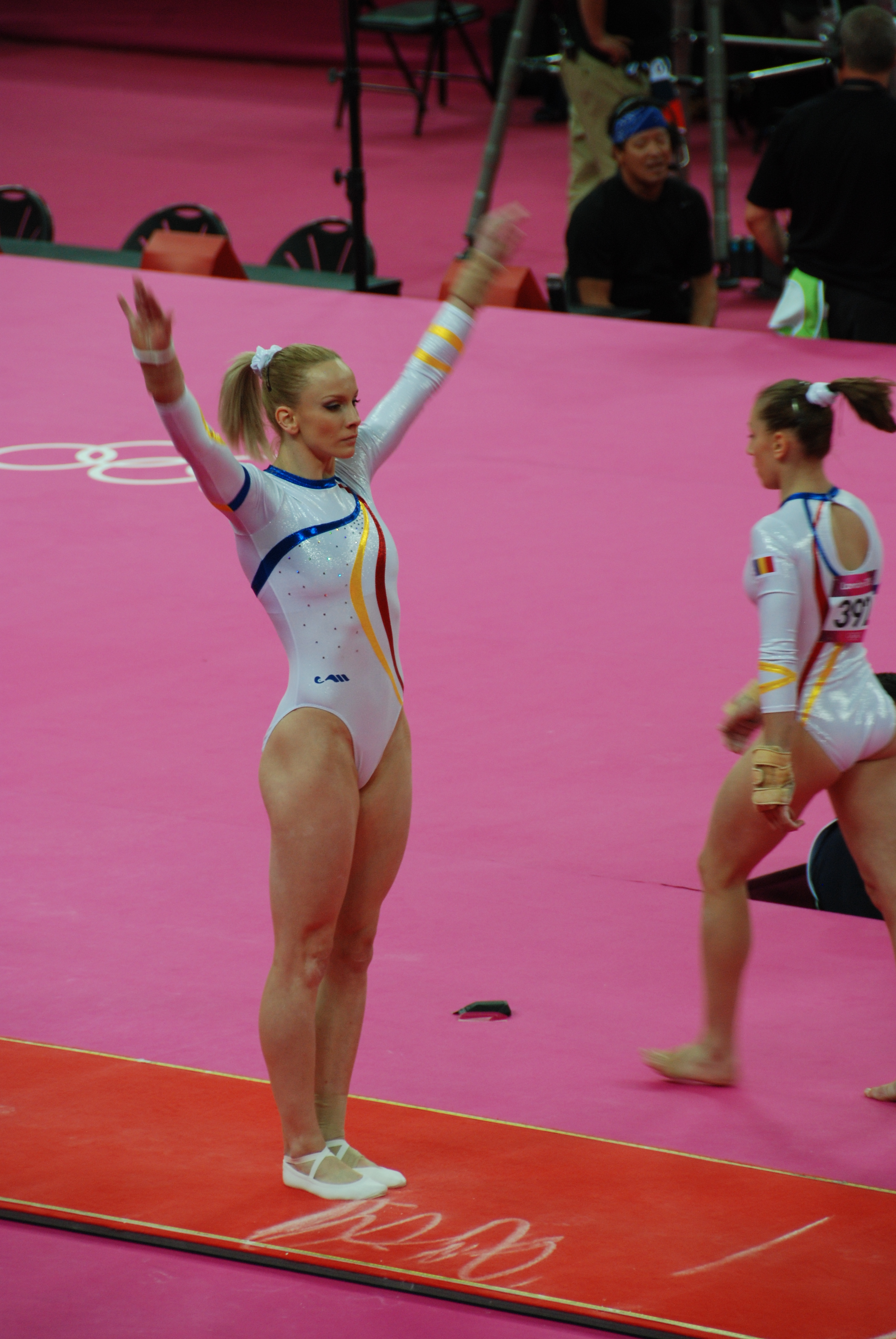
Izbaşa and Chelaru at London 2012 on 29 July.

In March, Chelaru competed at the American Cup in New York City, United States. She placed fifth in the all around competition with a score of 56.100.

Later in March, Chelaru competed at the Artistic Gymnastics World Cup event in Cottbus, Germany. She placed seventh on vault with a score of 13.500 and first on floor with a score of 14.375.

In April, Chelaru competed at an international meet against France in Cholet, France. She helped Romania to win the team competition and individually she placed fourth with an all around score of 55.000.

Later in April, Chelaru competed at an international meet against Germany and the United Kingdom in Ulm, Germany. She helped Romania to win the team competition and individually she placed third with a score of 54.750.

At the beginning of July, Chelaru competed at an international meet against France, Germany, and Italy in Bucharest, Romania. She helped Romania to win the team competition with scores of 14.750 on vault and 13.850 on uneven bars.

==== London Olympics ====
At the end of July, Chelaru competed at the 2012 Summer Olympics in London, United Kingdom. She performed on vault, uneven bars, and floor, earning a total score of 42.732 toward the Romanian team's fourth-place finish in qualifications. In the team final, she contributed an uneven bars score of 13.633 toward the Romanian team's third-place finish.

The Romanian senior team was tested after the Olympics. The ones that could not keep up with the new demands were shifted. Chelaru, along with Amelia Racea, retired as a consequence.

== Personal life ==
Chelaru currently lives in the United Kingdom and coaches at a gymnastics club in London.

== Competitive history ==
Year	Event	AA	Team	VT	BB	UB	FX
2009	European Championships	14					
2010	European Championships		3rd	4			3rd
2010	World Championships		4	7			2nd
2011	European Championships	4					2nd
2011	World Championships		4				8
2012	American Cup	5					
2012	Olympic Games		3rd				
