= Amelia Racea =

Romanian artistic gymnast

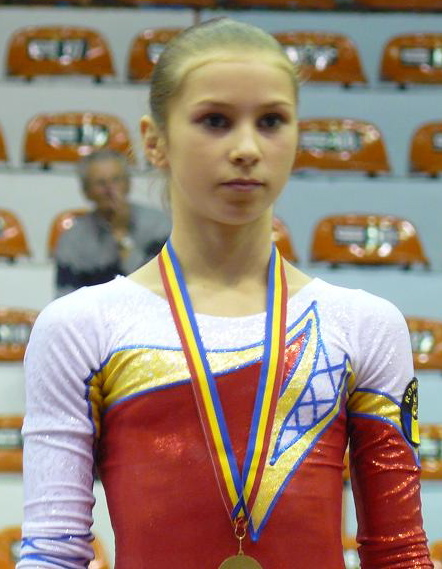

Personal information
- Full name: Elena Amelia Racea
- Nickname: Ama
- Born: 29 August 1994 (age 32) Tîrgu Jiu

Gymnastics career
- Discipline: Women's artistic gymnastics
- Country represented: Romania
- Club: CSS Deva
- Head coaches: Octavian Bellu, Mariana Bitang
- Assistant coaches: Liliana Cozma, Lucian Sandu, Mircea Vintila
- Former coaches: Nicolae Forminte, Florin Cotutiu, Ramona Micu, Corina Dodean
- Choreographer: Puia Valer
Medal record
Representing Romania
European Championships
Gold medal – first place	2010 Birmingham	Balance Beam
Bronze medal – third place	2010 Birmingham	Team
Bronze medal – third place	2011 Berlin	All-Around

Elena Amelia Racea (born 29 August 1994 in Tîrgu Jiu, Romania) is a Romanian artistic gymnast. She is a European champion on balance beam and a European all-around and team bronze medalist.

== Gymnastics career ==
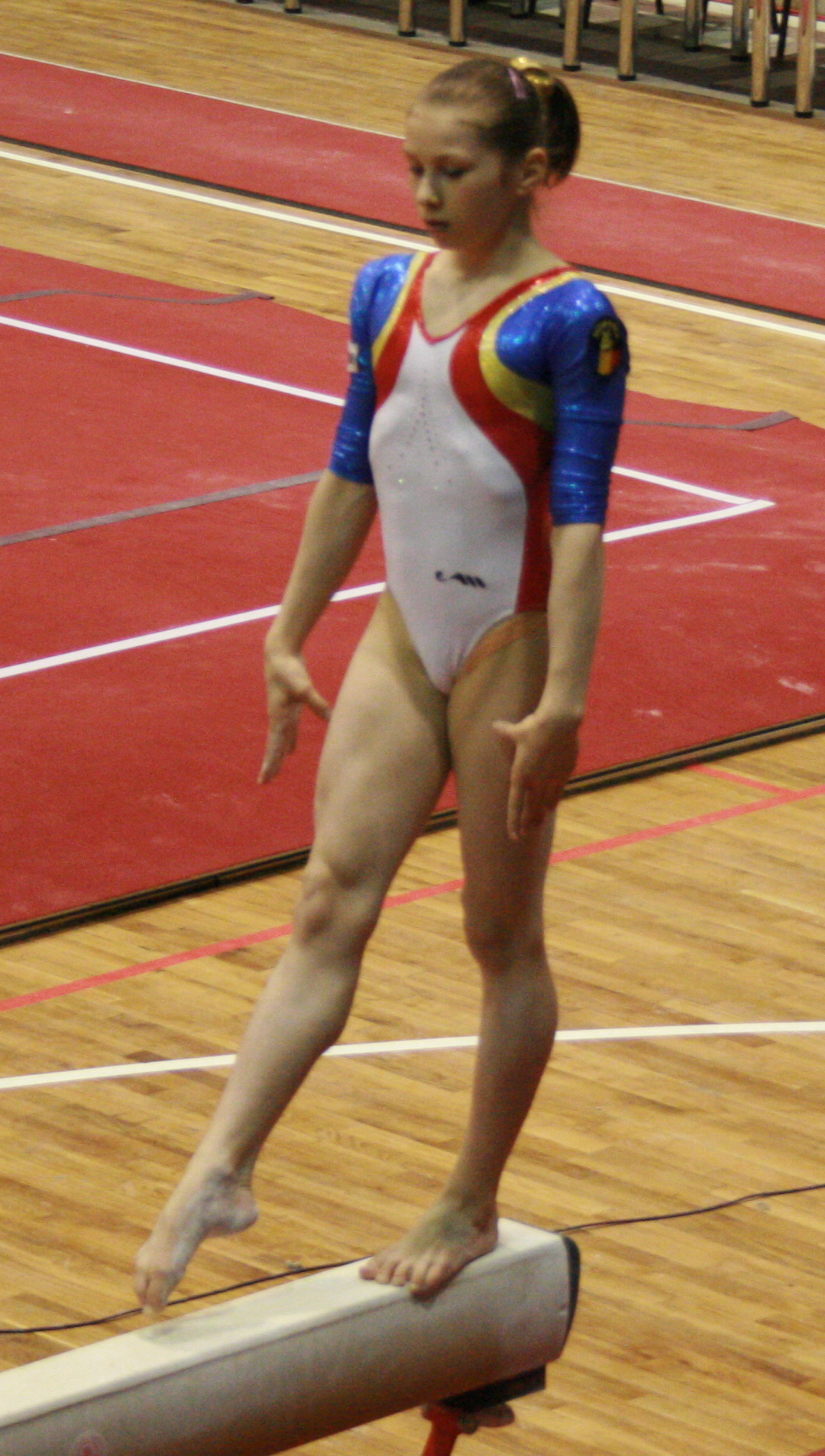
Amelia Racea on beam.

Racea started gymnastics at the age of 6 and won her first all-around national title in her age category in 2007. In 2008, she joined the junior national team in Deva. She had a successful junior career, medaling at various international competitions. She won silver on beam, bronze on floor, and placed fourth all around and with the team at the 2008 Junior European Championships. In 2009, she placed fifth all around at the prestigious American Cup ahead of more experienced gymnasts such as Koko Tsurumi and Kristina Goryunova. If not for a fall from uneven bars she might have placed higher. Later that year she won the all-around junior title at both the City of Jesolo Trophy in Italy and the Lugano Trophy in Switzerland. The 10th European Youth Olympic Festival in Tampere was a very successful meet for Racea. Here, she won a total of six medals: two gold (vault and beam) and four silver (floor, uneven bars, all-around, and team).

=== 2010 ===
Racea's senior debut at a major international competition was at the 2010 European Championships. Here she qualified for the vault and floor finals and contributed to the team bronze medal. In the beam final, she replaced the top qualifier Ana Porgras, who withdrew due to an ankle injury. She won the gold medal on beam and placed fifth on floor and seventh on vault. Due to injuries, Racea was a reserve of the team for the 2010 World Championships, and she did not compete at this event.

=== 2011 ===
Her first 2011 competition was the European Championships in Berlin. Here she had a weak performance on qualification day with mistakes on floor, beam and uneven bars. Consequently, she failed to qualify on beam and barely qualified in the all-around final (22nd place). However, in the all around final Racea managed to have clean routines and edged teammate Diana Chelaru for the bronze medal. She also placed seventh in the vault final. A week later she participated at the 2011 Glasgow World Cup, where she won the all around title ahead of Jessica López and teammate Raluca Haidu. In August–September 2011, she had good performances at the Romanian National Championships (second all around) and at two friendly meets in Germany and Great Britain. After these competitions, she went with the Romanian team to compete at the 2011 World Championships. Here, she helped her team place fourth by competing on uneven bars and on beam in the team final. Individually, she placed fifth in the beam final.

== Post-gymnastics career ==
Following her gymnastics career, she joined Circul Metropolitan Bucuresti, and has said that training for the circus is easier than her gymnastics training.
