= Kayla Williams (gymnast) =

American artistic gymnast (born 1993)

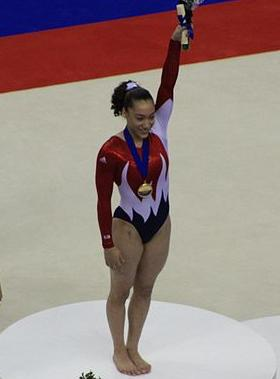
- Williams on the podium at the 2009 World Championships

Personal information
- Full name: Kayla Rose Williams
- Born: May 8, 1993 (age 33) Nitro, West Virginia, U.S.
- Height: 5 ft 2 in (157 cm)

Gymnastics career
- Discipline: Women's artistic gymnastics
- Country represented: United States (2009)
- College team: Alabama Crimson Tide
- Gym: Bozho's Gym Nest (1999-2009); Cincinnati Gymnastics Academy
- Head coach: Mary Lee Tracy
Medal record
Representing United States
World Championships
Gold medal – first place	2009 London	Vault
NCAA Championships
Gold medal – first place	2012 Duluth	Team
Bronze medal – third place	2013 Los Angeles	Team
Bronze medal – third place	2015 Fort Worth	Vault

Kayla Rose Williams (born May 8, 1993) is an American artistic gymnast. She is the 2009 vault world champion and 2009 vault national champion.

== Senior career ==
Williams began 2009 as a Level 10 gymnast, which is below elite level in USA Gymnastics. In May 2009, she won the Junior Olympic National Championships in the all-around, vault, and floor exercise and won second on balance beam. She qualified to elite level at a meet in June.

After qualifying for the U.S. Classic, she won the vault and floor exercise at that event and placed fifth in the all-around and on balance beam. This qualified her to the 2009 USA Gymnastics National Championships. Williams was the first West Virginian since Mary Lou Retton in 1984 to compete at the U.S. Championships. At the U.S. Championships, she won the National title on vault and made the U.S. National Team as a senior elite. Two months later, Williams was named to the team for the 2009 World Artistic Gymnastics Championships.

At the 2009 World Championships, Williams qualified first on vault. On the night of the vault event final, she competed a handspring laidout Rudi and a Yurchenko double full for a combined score of 15.087 and won the gold medal. She is the first American gymnast to win the World vault title.

== Collegiate career ==
She retired from elite gymnastics in July 2010, but continued to compete in Level 10 and in the NCAA. In May 2010, she committed to compete for the University of Alabama gymnastics team.

As a freshman in 2012, Williams helped lead Alabama to their second consecutive National Championship. As a senior in 2015, she won bronze on the vault at the NCAA Championships.

== Personal life ==
Williams attended Huntington High School.

Williams attended the University of Alabama, graduating with a bachelor's degree in public relations in August 2014. and an MA in public relations in 2015. Williams attended Tulane Law School, graduating with a Juris Doctor in 2023.
