= Ekaterina Kurbatova =

Russian artistic gymnast

- Full name: Ekaterina Vladimirovna Kurbatova
- Born: October 7, 1992 (age 33) Moscow, Russia
- Height: 162 cm (5 ft 4 in)

Gymnastics career
- Discipline: Women's artistic gymnastics
- Country represented: Russia (2007 -)
- Club: CSKA Moscow
- Gym: "Lake Krugloe"
- Head coach: Marina Ulyankina
- Choreographer: Olga Burova
Medal record
Event	1st	2nd	3rd
World Championships	1	0	0
European Championships	2	0	0
Representing Russia
World Championships
Gold medal – first place	2010 Rotterdam	Team
European Championships
Gold medal – first place	2010 Birmingham	Team
Gold medal – first place	2010 Birmingham	Vault

Ekaterina Vladimirovna Kurbatova (Russian: Екатери́на Влади́мировна Курба́това) (born October 7, 1992) is a Russian gymnast.

== Career ==
Kurbatova competed in the 2009 Glasgow Grand Prix in May, winning vault and placing 3rd on the uneven bars. She also went to the world championships that year in London, where she qualified for the all-around and placed 9th on uneven bars behind Italy's Serena Lichetta. In the all-around competition, she fell on balance beam taking her out of the medals.

In 2010, Kurbatova competed at the European Championships, where she won the gold medal with her team and on vault. At the 2010 Moscow World Cup, she made both vault and floor finals, and finished on 4th and 1st respectively. She was also part of the 2010 World Championship team and was mostly taken along due to her vaulting, when it became clear that the Russian team was in desperate need for a third vaulter in team finals. The team went on to become the first Russian gymnastics team ever to win a team gold medal in a World Championship or Olympic Games.

Kurbatova is known for her unique style: a "kick-in" on vault with an unorthodox leg form. Her choreography is viewed as distinctive, reaching it's zenith with performing a combination of Pak salto into a Khorkina II transition. She is one of the few Russian gymnasts ever having performed a one-armed pirouette which is more often seen amongst Chinese gymnasts.

== Competitive history ==
Year	Event	Team	AA	VT	UB	BB	FX
2009	World Championships		10th	4th			
2010	European Championships	1st		1st			
2010	World Championships	1st					
2011	Russian Cup		11th				

Year	Competition Description	Location	Apparatus	Rank-Final	Score-Final	Rank-Qualifying	Score-Qualifying
2009	World Championships	London	All-Around	10	55.475	6	55.950
2009	World Championships	London	Vault	4	14.337	5	14.225
2009	World Championships	London	Uneven Bars			9	14.200
2009	World Championships	London	Balance Beam			19	13.750
2009	World Championships	London	Floor Exercise			13	13.475
2010	European Championships	Birmingham	Team	1	169.700	1	168.325
2010	European Championships	Birmingham	Vault	1	14.287	4	14.075
2010	European Championships	Birmingham	Uneven Bars			57	11.425
2010	World Championships	Rotterdam	Team	1	175.397	1	234.521
2010	World Championships	Rotterdam	Vault	WD		4	14.633
2010	World Championships	Rotterdam	Uneven Bars			13	14.300
