= Anna Myzdrikova =

Russian artistic gymnast (born 1992)

- Full name: Anna Andreevna Myzdrikova
- Born: October 22, 1992 (age 33) Moscow, Russia
- Height: 160 cm (5 ft 3 in)

Gymnastics career
- Discipline: Women's artistic gymnastics
- Country represented: Russia (2008–13)
- Club: CSKA Moscow
- Gym: "Lake Krugloe"
- Head coach: Vladimir Kuznetsov
- Assistant coach: Elena Kuznetsova
- Choreographer: Tania Kosperovich
- Retired: 2013
Medal record
Event	1st	2nd	3rd
European Championships	1	1	0
Pacific Rim Championships	1	0	1
Summer Universiade	0	1	1
Representing Russia
European Championships
Gold medal – first place	2010 Birmingham	Team
Silver medal – second place	2010 Birmingham	Floor Exercise
Pacific Rim Championships
Gold medal – first place	2008 San Jose	Vault
Bronze medal – third place	2008 San Jose	Floor Exercise
Summer Universiade
Silver medal – second place	2011 Shenzhen	Vault
Bronze medal – third place	2011 Shenzhen	Team

Anna Andreevna Myzdrikova (Russian: Анна Андреевна Мыздрикова; born October 22, 1992) is a Russian artistic gymnast. She won two medals at the 2010 European Championships.

== Career ==
In 2008, Myzdrikova competed in the Pacific Rim Championships. She won gold on the vault with a score of 14.400 and bronze on the floor with a score of 15.050.

Myzdrikova competed at the 2009 World Championships. She qualified first into the floor final and third into the vault final. She finished fourth on floor and sixth on vault.

At the 2010 European Championships, she won the gold medal with her team and the silver medal on the floor exercise.

Myzdrikova was originally a member of the 2010 Russian women's gymnastics team that competed at the World Championships in Rotterdam. However, she was placed as an alternate during qualifications and the team finals. At the 2011 Summer Universiade, she placed third with her team, and she placed second on vault.

At the 2013 Russian Nationals, Myzdrikova won the silver with her team, Moscow, but placed seventeenth in the all-around.

== Notable skills ==
Floor exercise: (1) Round-off, back-handspring, triple twisting layout, connected to a back tuck. (2) Round-off, whip-back, double Arabian.

== Competitive history ==
Year	Event	Team	AA	VT	UB	BB	FX
2008	Pacific Rim Championships	5th		1st			3rd
2009	Japan Cup	2nd					
2009	World Championships			6th			4th
2010	European Championships	1st				5th	2nd
2011	Universiade	3rd		2nd			
2012	National Championships	1st	13th	7th			
2012	Russian Cup	1st	6th	3rd		7th	7th
2013	National Championships	2nd	17th	7th			
2013	Gym Festival Trnava		4th	3rd			2nd

Year	Competition description	Location	Apparatus	Rank-Final	Score-Final	Rank-Qualifying	Score-Qualifying
2009	World Championships	London	Vault	6	14.225	3	14.450
2009	World Championships	London	Balance beam			16	13.825
2009	World Championships	London	Floor exercise	4	14.275	1	14.500
2010	European Championships	Birmingham	Team	1	169.700	1	168.325
2010	European Championships	Birmingham	Vault			5	14.012
2010	European Championships	Birmingham	Balance beam	5	13.150	6	14.025
2010	European Championships	Birmingham	Floor exercise	2	14.325	6	13.700
