= 2009 World Artistic Gymnastics Championships =

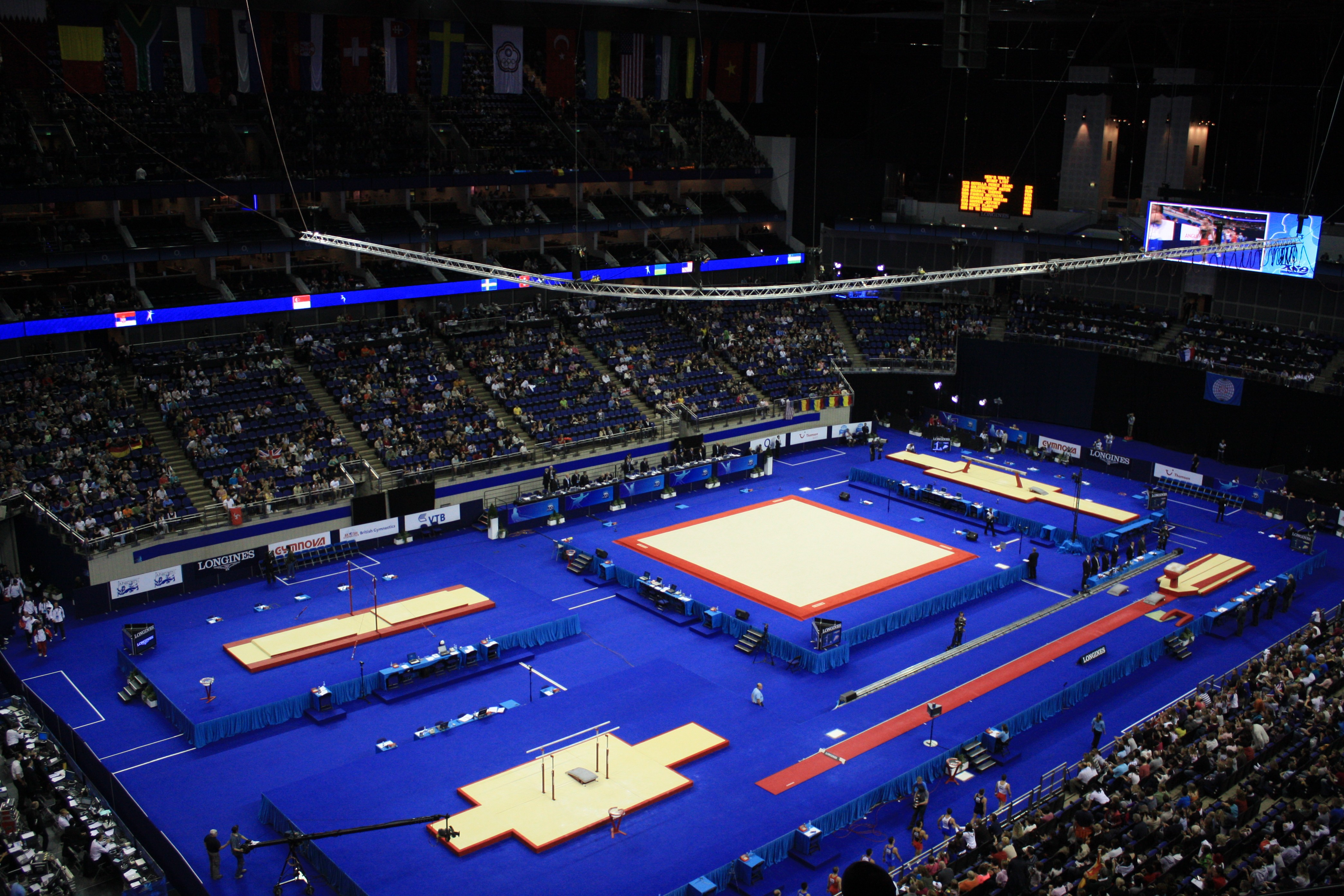
- The O2 Arena during the Championships.
- Venue: The O2 Arena
- Location: London, United Kingdom
- Start date: 12 October 2009
- End date: 18 October 2009

The 41st World Artistic Gymnastics Championships was held at The O2 Arena in London from 12 to 18 October 2009. Similar to the 2005 World Championships, there were no team competitions. Individual all-around and event finals were contested.

== Competition schedule ==
(Local time, UTC+1)

- 13 October 2009 Men's Qualification
  - 09:50 Subdivision 1
  - 14:30 Subdivision 2
  - 19:00 Subdivision 3
- 14 October 2009 Women's Qualification
  - 09:50 Subdivision 1
  - 12:30 Subdivision 2
  - 15:40 Subdivision 3
  - 18:20 Subdivision 4
  - 20:50 Subdivision 5
- 15 October 2009 18:30 Men's All-around Final
- 16 October 2009 18:30 Women's All-around Final
- 17 October 2009 Apparatus Final Day 1
  - 13:00 Men's Floor Exercise
  - 13:40 Women's Vault
  - 14:45 Men's Pommel Horse
  - 15:25 Women's Uneven Bars
  - 16:05 Men's Rings
- 18 October 2009 Apparatus Final Day 2
  - 13:00 Men's Vault
  - 13:35 Women's Balance Beam
  - 14:35 Men's Parallel Bars
  - 15:15 Women's Floor Exercise
  - 15:50 Men's Horizontal Bar

== Medal winners ==
Event	Gold	Silver	Bronze
Men
Individual all-around	Kōhei Uchimura (JPN)	Daniel Keatings (GBR)	Yury Ryazanov (RUS)
Floor	Marian Drăgulescu (ROU)	Zou Kai (CHN)	Alexander Shatilov (ISR)
Pommel horse	Zhang Hongtao (CHN)	Krisztián Berki (HUN)	Prashanth Sellathurai (AUS)
Rings	Yan Mingyong (CHN)	Yordan Yovchev (BUL)	Oleksandr Vorobiov (UKR)
Vault	Marian Drăgulescu (ROU)	Flavius Koczi (ROU)	Anton Golotsutskov (RUS)
Parallel bars	Wang Guanyin (CHN)	Feng Zhe (CHN)	Kazuhito Tanaka (JPN)
Horizontal bar	Zou Kai (CHN)	Epke Zonderland (NED)	Igor Cassina (ITA)
Women
Individual all-around	Bridget Sloan (USA)	Rebecca Bross (USA)	Koko Tsurumi (JPN)
Vault	Kayla Williams (USA)	Ariella Käslin (SUI)	Youna Dufournet (FRA)
Uneven bars	He Kexin (CHN)	Koko Tsurumi (JPN)	Ana Porgras (ROM) Rebecca Bross (USA)
Balance beam	Deng Linlin (CHN)	Lauren Mitchell (AUS)	Ivana Hong (USA)
Floor	Elizabeth Tweddle (GBR)	Lauren Mitchell (AUS)	Sui Lu (CHN)

=== Women's ===
- 2009 World Artistic Gymnastics Championships – Women's qualification

== Men's Events ==
=== Individual all-around ===
Oldest and youngest competitors

Men	Name	Country	Date of birth	Age
Youngest	Sergio Sasaki Junior	Brazil	31/03/92	17 years
Oldest	Ildar Valeiev	Kazakhstan	18/02/74	35 years

Position	Gymnast	Floor (gymnastics)	Pommel horse	Rings (gymnastics)	Vault (gymnastics)	Parallel bars	Horizontal bar	Total
1st place, gold medalist(s)	Kōhei Uchimura (JPN)	15.625	14.900	15.225	16.050	14.725	14.975	91.500
2nd place, silver medalist(s)	Daniel Keatings (GBR)	14.250	15.500	14.200	15.450	15.050	14.475	88.925
3rd place, bronze medalist(s)	Yury Ryazanov (RUS)	14.825	13.400	14.825	15.925	14.925	14.500	88.400
4	Kazuhito Tanaka (JPN)	14.650	13.200	15.075	15.400	15.075	14.900	88.300
5	Maxim Devyatovskiy (RUS)	15.000	13.425	15.075	14.875	14.550	14.550	87.475
6	Kristian Thomas (GBR)	15.000	13.600	14.575	15.800	13.975	14.400	87.350
7	Timothy McNeill (USA)	14.500	15.000	14.325	15.300	14.200	13.825	87.150
8	Benoît Caranobe (FRA)	14.025	14.150	14.750	16.025	13.000	14.225	86.175
9	Mykola Kuksenkov (UKR)	15.050	14.600	14.400	14.400	14.200	13.475	86.125
10	Enrico Pozzo (ITA)	14.750	13.625	14.025	15.350	14.075	14.275	86.100
11	Alexander Shatilov (ISR)	15.225	14.075	14.225	15.350	14.350	12.600	85.825
12	Marcel Nguyen (GER)	15.075	13.425	14.525	15.325	13.200	14.225	85.775
13	Jorge Hugo Giraldo Lopez (COL)	13.250	13.350	14.125	15.225	14.975	14.150	85.075
13	Roman Gisi (SUI)	14.225	13.875	14.175	15.125	13.525	14.150	85.075
15	Manuel Almeida Campos (POR)	14.875	12.850	14.075	14.550	14.550	14.000	84.900
16	Nicolas Boeschenstein (SUI)	14.425	11.775	14.250	15.600	14.625	14.100	84.775
17	Jonathan Horton (USA)	13.775	11.100	14.900	15.750	15.125	13.650	84.300
18	Ildar Valeiev (KAZ)	13.525	13.225	14.725	15.250	13.900	13.575	84.200
19	Sergio Sasaki Junior (BRA)	13.925	13.800	14.000	15.275	13.500	13.650	84.150
19	Sergio Muñoz (ESP)	14.675	11.750	14.625	15.975	13.100	14.025	84.150
21	Luis Rivera (PUR)	13.500	14.075	14.800	15.325	13.425	12.925	84.050
22	Artsiom Bykau (BLR)	13.525	13.125	14.200	15.225	13.425	13.450	82.950
23	Luis Vargas Velazquez (PUR)	14.000	10.900	13.350	15.100	14.725	14.125	82.200
24	Federico Molinari (ARG)	14.050	13.225	14.300	14.175	12.575	13.475	81.800

=== Floor ===
Oldest and youngest competitors

Men	Name	Country	Date of birth	Age
Youngest	Steven Legendre	United States	05/05/89	20 years
Oldest	Marian Drăgulescu	Romania	18/12/80	28 years

Position	Gymnast	D Score	E Score	Penalty	Total
1st place, gold medalist(s)	Marian Drăgulescu (ROU)	6.600	9.100		15.700
2nd place, silver medalist(s)	Zou Kai (CHN)	6.800	8.875		15.675
3rd place, bronze medalist(s)	Alexander Shatilov (ISR)	6.600	8.975		15.575
4	Kōhei Uchimura (JPN)	6.500	9.075	0.1	15.475
5	Makoto Okiguchi (JPN)	6.600	8.825		15.425
6	Matthias Fahrig (GER)	6.600	8.800		15.400
7	Tomás González (CHI)	6.600	8.625		15.225
8	Steven Legendre (USA)	6.200	8.750		14.950

=== Pommel horse ===
Oldest and youngest competitors

Men	Name	Country	Date of birth	Age
Youngest	Louis Smith	United Kingdom	22/04/89	20 years
Oldest	Krisztián Berki	Hungary	18/03/85	24 years

Position	Gymnast	D Score	E Score	Penalty	Total
1st place, gold medalist(s)	Zhang Hongtao (CHN)	6.600	9.600		16.200
2nd place, silver medalist(s)	Krisztián Berki (HUN)	6.900	9.175		16.075
3rd place, bronze medalist(s)	Prashanth Sellathurai (AUS)	6.600	8.800		15.400
4	Cyril Tommasone (FRA)	6.500	8.725		15.225
5	Timothy McNeill (USA)	6.400	8.750		15.150
6	Flavius Koczi (ROU)	6.600	8.375		14.975
7	Robert Seligman (CRO)	6.100	8.650		14.750
8	Louis Smith (GBR)	6.600	7.850		14.450

=== Rings ===
Oldest and youngest competitors

Men	Name	Country	Date of birth	Age
Youngest	Arthur Zanetti	Brazil	16/04/90	19 years
Oldest	Yordan Yovchev	Bulgaria	24/02/73	36 years

Position	Gymnast	D Score	E Score	Penalty	Total
1st place, gold medalist(s)	Yan Mingyong (CHN)	6.800	8.875		15.675
2nd place, silver medalist(s)	Yordan Yovchev (BUL)	6.700	8.875		15.575
3rd place, bronze medalist(s)	Oleksandr Vorobiov (UKR)	6.800	8.750		15.550
4	Arthur Zanetti (BRA)	6.500	8.825		15.325
4	George Robert Stănescu (ROU)	6.800	8.525		15.325
6	Matteo Morandi (ITA)	6.700	8.600		15.300
7	Samir Aït Saïd (FRA)	6.700	8.550		15.250
8	Danny Pinheiro-Rodrigues (FRA)	7.100	7.650		14.750

=== Vault ===
Oldest and youngest competitors

Men	Name	Country	Date of birth	Age
Youngest	Flavius Koczi	Romania	26/08/87	22 years
Oldest	Marian Drăgulescu	Romania	18/12/80	28 years

Position	Gymnast	D Score	E Score	Penalty	Score 1	D Score	E Score	Penalty	Score 2	Total
1st place, gold medalist(s)	Marian Drăgulescu (ROU)	7.000	9.550		16.550	7.200	9.400		16.600	16.575
2nd place, silver medalist(s)	Flavius Koczi (ROU)	7.000	9.375		16.375	7.000	9.300		16.300	16.337
3rd place, bronze medalist(s)	Anton Golotsutskov (RUS)	7.000	9.375		16.375	7.000	9.200		16.200	16.287
4	Matthias Fahrig (GER)	7.000	8.925	0.1	15.825	6.600	9.275		15.875	15.850
5	Thomas Bouhail (FRA)	7.000	8.350	0.1	15.250	7.000	9.300		16.300	15.775
6	Isaac Botella Pérez (ESP)	6.600	9.200		15.800	6.600	9.000	0.1	15.500	15.650
7	Ri Se Gwang (PRK)	7.200	8.375		15.575	7.000	9.125	0.4	15.725	15.650
8	Jeffrey Wammes (NED)	6.600	9.350		15.950	6.600	8.300		14.900	15.425
Position	Gymnast	Vault 1				Vault 2				Total

=== Parallel bars ===
Oldest and youngest competitors

Men	Name	Country	Date of birth	Age
Youngest	Phạm Phước Hưng	Vietnam	10/06/88	21 years
Oldest	Vasileios Tsolakidis	Greece	09/09/79	30 years

Position	Gymnast	D Score	E Score	Penalty	Total
1st place, gold medalist(s)	Wang Guanyin (CHN)	7.000	8.975		15.975
2nd place, silver medalist(s)	Feng Zhe (CHN)	6.900	8.875		15.775
3rd place, bronze medalist(s)	Kazuhito Tanaka (JPN)	6.400	9.100		15.500
4	Vasileios Tsolakidis (GRE)	6.300	9.050		15.350
5	Won Chul Yoo (KOR)	6.700	8.600		15.300
6	Epke Zonderland (NED)	6.100	9.025		15.125
7	Phạm Phước Hưng (VIE)	5.900	8.575		14.475
8	Adam Kierzowski (POL)	6.300	8.025		14.325

=== Horizontal bar ===
Oldest and youngest competitors

Men	Name	Country	Date of birth	Age
Youngest	Danell Leyva	United States	30/10/91	17 years
Oldest	Aljaž Pegan	Slovenia	02/06/74	35 years

Position	Gymnast	D Score	E Score	Penalty	Total
1st place, gold medalist(s)	Zou Kai (CHN)	7.500	8.650		16.150
2nd place, silver medalist(s)	Epke Zonderland (NED)	7.300	8.525		15.825
3rd place, bronze medalist(s)	Igor Cassina (ITA)	6.700	8.925		15.625
4	Danell Leyva (USA)	7.000	8.600		15.600
5	Aljaž Pegan (SLO)	7.000	8.500		15.500
6	Kōhei Uchimura (JPN)	6.400	8.775		15.175
7	Aliaksandr Tsarevich (BLR)	6.000	8.375		14.375
8	Jonathan Horton (USA)	6.700	6.550		13.250

== Women's ==
=== Individual all-around ===
Oldest and youngest competitors

Men	Name	Country	Date of birth	Age
Youngest	Ana Porgras	Romania	18/12/93	15 years
Oldest	Miki Uemura	Japan	06/03/86	23 years

Position	Gymnast	Vault (gymnastics)	Uneven bars	Balance beam	Floor (gymnastics)	Total
1st place, gold medalist(s)	Bridget Sloan (USA)	14.825	14.800	14.000	14.200	57.825
2nd place, silver medalist(s)	Rebecca Bross (USA)	14.525	15.075	15.300	12.875	57.775
3rd place, bronze medalist(s)	Koko Tsurumi (JPN)	13.600	15.050	14.800	13.725	57.175
4	Lauren Mitchell (AUS)	14.400	13.625	15.100	14.025	57.150
5	Youna Dufournet (FRA)	14.300	14.600	14.450	13.300	56.650
6	Yang Yilin (CHN)	14.700	13.950	14.225	13.700	56.575
7	Ana Porgras (ROU)	13.675	14.675	14.125	14.025	56.500
8	Ariella Käslin (SUI)	15.125	13.875	13.500	13.425	55.925
9	Anamaria Tămârjan (ROU)	14.275	13.625	14.125	13.600	55.625
10	Yekaterina Kurbatova (RUS)	14.625	14.700	12.850	13.300	55.475
11	Deng Linlin (CHN)	14.225	13.900	13.500	13.600	55.225
12	Elsa García (MEX)	13.975	14.175	13.400	13.325	54.875
13	Ksenia Semenova (RUS)	13.400	13.250	14.225	13.650	54.525
14	Bruna Leal (BRA)	14.050	13.500	13.250	13.275	54.075
15	Pauline Morel (FRA)	13.725	13.900	13.175	13.050	53.850
16	Rebecca Downie (GBR)	14.500	13.600	12.150	13.525	53.775
17	Kim Un-hyang (PRK)	13.400	13.075	14.550	12.600	53.625
18	Rebecca Wing (GBR)	13.950	13.300	13.600	12.550	53.400
19	Brittany Rogers (CAN)	13.900	13.650	12.600	12.925	53.075
20	Paola Galante (ITA)	13.200	13.025	13.625	13.175	53.025
21	Veronica Wagner (SWE)	13.725	12.075	13.850	12.800	52.450
22	Miki Uemura (JPN)	13.325	12.800	12.200	12.750	51.075
23	Kim Bùi (GER)	13.550	11.575	13.100	12.250	50.475
24	Mayra Kroonen (NED)	13.100	11.525	12.075	13.200	49.900

=== Vault ===
Oldest and youngest competitors

	Name	Country	Date of birth	Age
Youngest	Youna Dufournet	France	19/10/93	15 years
Oldest	Ariella Käslin	Switzerland	11/10/87	22 years

Position	Gymnast	D Score	E Score	Penalty	Score 1	D Score	E Score	Penalty	Score 2	Total
1st place, gold medalist(s)	Kayla Williams (USA)	6.300	8.900		15.200	5.800	9.175		14.975	15.087
2nd place, silver medalist(s)	Ariella Käslin (SUI)	6.300	8.775		15.075	5.300	8.775	0.1	13.975	14.525
3rd place, bronze medalist(s)	Youna Dufournet (FRA)	5.300	8.975		14.275	5.600	9.025		14.625	14.450
4	Yekaterina Kurbatova (RUS)	5.800	8.925		14.725	5.600	8.450	0.1	13.950	14.337
5	Hong Un-jong (PRK)	6.500	7.925	0.1	14.425	6.500	7.700	0.1	14.100	14.262
6	Anna Myzdrikova (RUS)	5.600	8.775	0.1	14.275	5.800	8.475	0.1	14.175	14.225
7	Brittany Rogers (CAN)	5.800	8.625		14.425	5.600	8.475	0.1	13.975	14.200
8	Elsa García (MEX)	5.300	8.800	0.1	14.000	5.200	7.475	0.1	12.525	13.287
Position	Gymnast	Vault 1				Vault 2				Total

=== Uneven bars ===
Oldest and youngest competitors

	Name	Country	Date of birth	Age
Youngest	Ana Porgras	Romania	18/12/93	15 years
Oldest	Cha Yong-hwa	North Korea	08/01/90	19 years

Position	Gymnast	D Score	E Score	Penalty	Total
1st place, gold medalist(s)	He Kexin (CHN)	7.100	8.900		16.000
2nd place, silver medalist(s)	Koko Tsurumi (JPN)	6.200	8.675		14.875
3rd place, bronze medalist(s)	Rebecca Bross (USA)	6.200	8.475		14.675
3rd place, bronze medalist(s)	Ana Porgras (ROU)	6.300	8.375		14.675
5	Cha Yong-hwa (PRK)	6.300	8.350		14.650
6	Bridget Sloan (USA)	5.900	8.700		14.600
7	Larrissa Miller (AUS)	5.900	8.675		14.575
8	Serena Licchetta (ITA)	5.100	6.850		11.950

=== Balance beam ===
Oldest and youngest competitors

	Name	Country	Date of birth	Age
Youngest	Ana Porgras	Romania	18/12/93	15 years
Oldest	Kim Un Hyang	North Korea	18/10/90	19 years

Position	Gymnast	D Score	E Score	Penalty	Total
1st place, gold medalist(s)	Deng Linlin (CHN)	6.400	8.600		15.000
2nd place, silver medalist(s)	Lauren Mitchell (AUS)	6.300	8.575		14.875
3rd place, bronze medalist(s)	Ivana Hong (USA)	6.000	8.550		14.550
4	Kim Un-hyang (PRK)	6.000	8.450		14.450
5	Elisabetta Preziosa (ITA)	5.800	8.400		14.200
6	Koko Tsurumi (JPN)	5.700	8.500	0.1	14.100
7	Ana Porgras (ROM)	6.400	7.025		13.425
8	Yang Yilin (CHN)	5.600	7.525		13.125

=== Floor ===
Oldest and youngest competitors

	Name	Country	Date of birth	Age
Youngest	Ana Porgras	Romania	18/12/93	15 years
Oldest	Elizabeth Tweddle	United Kingdom	01/04/85	24 years

Position	Gymnast	D Score	E Score	Penalty	Total
1st place, gold medalist(s)	Elizabeth Tweddle (GBR)	6.100	8.550		14.650
2nd place, silver medalist(s)	Lauren Mitchell (AUS)	5.800	8.750		14.550
3rd place, bronze medalist(s)	Sui Lu (CHN)	5.700	8.600		14.300
4	Anna Myzdrikova (RUS)	5.900	8.375		14.275
5	Rebecca Bross (USA)	5.700	8.425		14.125
5	Ana Porgras (ROM)	5.500	8.625		14.125
7	Deng Linlin (CHN)	5.400	8.475		13.825
8	Jessica Gil Ortiz (COL)^{‡}	0.900	2.075		2.975

^{‡} = Jessica Gil Ortiz was unable to complete her floor exercise routine due to injury.

== Medal table ==
=== Overall ===
Rank	Nation	Gold	Silver	Bronze	Total
1	China	6	2	1	9
2	United States	2	1	2	5
3	Romania	2	1	1	4
4	Japan	1	1	2	4
5	Great Britain	1	1	0	2
6	Australia	0	2	1	3
7	Bulgaria	0	1	0	1
7	Hungary	0	1	0	1
7	Netherlands	0	1	0	1
7	Switzerland	0	1	0	1
11	Russia	0	0	2	2
12	France	0	0	1	1
12	Israel	0	0	1	1
12	Italy	0	0	1	1
12	Ukraine	0	0	1	1
Totals (15 entries)		12	12	13	37

=== Men ===
Rank	Nation	Gold	Silver	Bronze	Total
1	China	4	2	0	6
2	Romania	2	1	0	3
3	Japan	1	0	1	2
4	Bulgaria	0	1	0	1
4	Great Britain	0	1	0	1
4	Hungary	0	1	0	1
4	Netherlands	0	1	0	1
8	Russia	0	0	2	2
9	Australia	0	0	1	1
9	Israel	0	0	1	1
9	Italy	0	0	1	1
9	Ukraine	0	0	1	1
Totals (12 entries)		7	7	7	21

=== Women ===
Rank	Nation	Gold	Silver	Bronze	Total
1	United States	2	1	2	5
2	China	2	0	1	3
3	Great Britain	1	0	0	1
4	Australia	0	2	0	2
5	Japan	0	1	1	2
6	Switzerland	0	1	0	1
7	France	0	0	1	1
7	Romania	0	0	1	1
Totals (8 entries)		5	5	6	16
