= Natalia Kononenko =

Ukrainian artistic gymnast

- Full name: Natalia Alexeyevna Kononenko
- Alternative name: Nataliya
- Born: 25 August 1994 (age 32) Kyiv, Ukraine
- Height: 158 cm (5 ft 2 in)

Gymnastics career
- Country represented: Ukraine
- Club: Master of Sports of Ukraine
- Head coach: Igor Belyakov
- Eponymous skills: Kononenko (D) (uneven bars): Tkatchev with 1/2 turn
- Retired: 2012
Medal record
Representing Ukraine
European Championships
Bronze medal – third place	2010 Birmingham	Uneven bars
Bronze medal – third place	2012 Brussels	Uneven bars

Natalia Alexeyevna Kononenko (Ukrainian: Наталія Олексіївна Кононенко; born 25 August 1994) is a Ukrainian former artistic gymnast who competed at the 2012 Summer Olympics. She is a two-time European bronze medalist on the uneven bars.

== Gymnastics career ==
=== Junior ===
Kononenko competed at the 2008 Junior European Championships and helped the Ukrainian team finish seventh. She qualified for the uneven bars and balance beam event finals where she finished eighth and fourth respectively. She also competed at the 2009 Gymnasiade in Doha where the Ukrainian team won the bronze medal behind Russia and Italy. Individually, Kononenko finished seventh in the all-around. In the event finals, she won the silver medal on the uneven bars behind Aliya Mustafina and finished eighth on the balance beam.

=== Senior ===
At the 2010 European Championships in Birmingham, Kononenko contributed scores of 14.625 on uneven bars and 12.600 on balance beam towards Ukraine's eighth-place finish. She won the bronze medal on the uneven bars with a score of 14.750 behind Beth Tweddle and Aliya Mustafina.

At the 2012 London Prepares series, Kononenko placed eighth on the uneven bars. This qualified her a spot for the 2012 Olympics. Then at the 2012 European Championships in Brussels, she finished tenth with her team. She also won a bronze medal on the uneven bars with a score of 15.133 behind Russians Viktoria Komova and Anastasia Grishina. Kononenko was Ukraine's only representative for women's artistic gymnastics at the 2012 Summer Olympics. In the qualification round, she finished 44th in the all-around, and did not qualify into any event finals.

== Eponymous skill ==
Kononenko has one eponymous skill listed in the Code of Points.

Apparatus	Name	Description	Difficulty (Note: Valid for the 2025–2028 Code of Points)	Added to the Code of Points
Uneven bars	Kononenko	Tkatchev with ½ turn (180°)	D (0.4)	2011 World Championships

== See also ==
- List of Olympic female artistic gymnasts for Ukraine
