= Nicole Hibbert =

British artistic gymnast (born 1994)

- Born: 1994 (age 31–32) Great Britain

Gymnastics career
- Discipline: Women's artistic gymnastics
- Country represented: United Kingdom
Medal record
Representing United Kingdom
Women's artistic Gymnastics
European Championships
Silver medal – second place	2010 Birmingham	Team

Nicole Hibbert (born 1994) is a British artistic gymnast.

== Career ==
Nicole Hibbert won a silver in senior team at the 2010 European Women's Artistic Gymnastics Championships.
