= Ana Porgras =

Romanian artistic gymnast

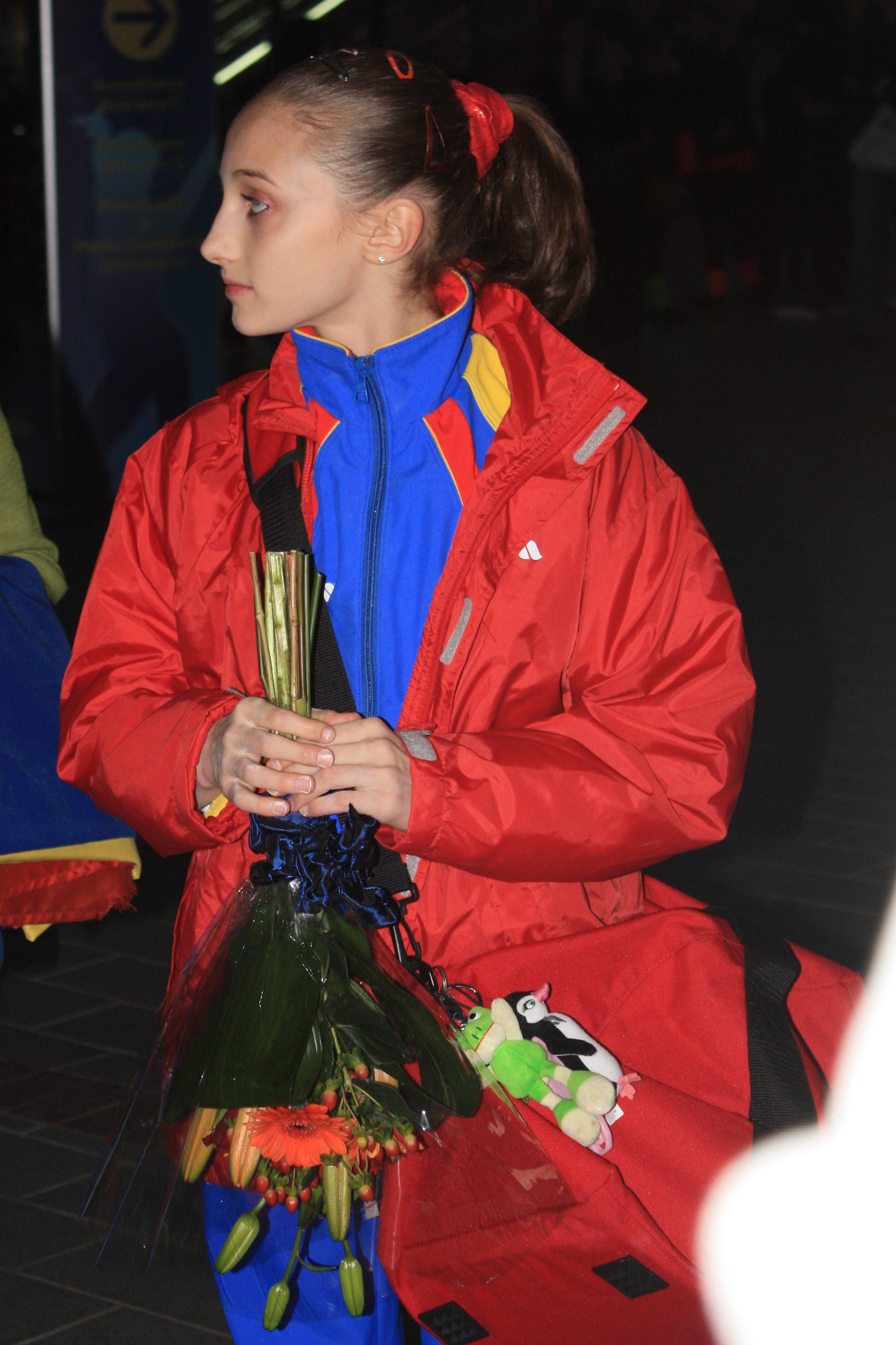
- Porgras at the 2009 World Championships

Personal information
- Full name: Ana Porgras
- Born: 18 December 1993 (age 32) Galați, Romania

Gymnastics career
- Discipline: Women's artistic gymnastics
- Country represented: Romania
- Club: Farul Constanta
- Head coaches: Octavian Bellu, Mariana Bitang
- Assistant coaches: Liliana Cozma, Lucian Sandu, Florin Cotuțiu
- Former coach: Nicolae Forminte
- Choreographer: Puia Valer
- Retired: 16 January 2012
Medal record
Women's gymnastics
Representing Romania
World Championships
Gold medal – first place	2010 Rotterdam	Balance Beam
Bronze medal – third place	2009 London	Uneven Bars
European Championships
Bronze medal – third place	2010 Birmingham	Team
FIG World Cup
Event / 1st / 2nd / 3rd; Apparatus World Cup / 2 / 2 / 0

Ana Porgras (born 18 December 1993) is a Romanian former artistic gymnast. She won the balance beam gold medal at the 2010 World Championships in Rotterdam and the uneven bars bronze medal at the 2009 World Championships. Porgras was considered to be one of the most artistic gymnasts of her generation, reminiscent of the Eastern European gymnasts of the 1980s. She was awarded the Longines Prize for Elegance in 2011.

== Early life and career ==
Porgras began gymnastics in her native town of Galați with coaches Agripina and Paul Gâlea. Later she joined the Romanian Junior National Team coached by Ramona Micu, Florin Cotuțiu and Daniel Nistor. Porgras had a successful junior career, medaling at various international competitions. In 2007, she won the gold medal on balance beam, bronze with the team, and placed seventh all-around, fifth on vault and eighth on uneven bars at the Massilia Cup. She also won the gold medal on balance beam at the 2008 Junior European Championships and placed ninth all-around and fourth with the team. Towards the end of her junior career she needed knee surgery to repair a detached ligament.

== Senior career ==
=== 2009 ===
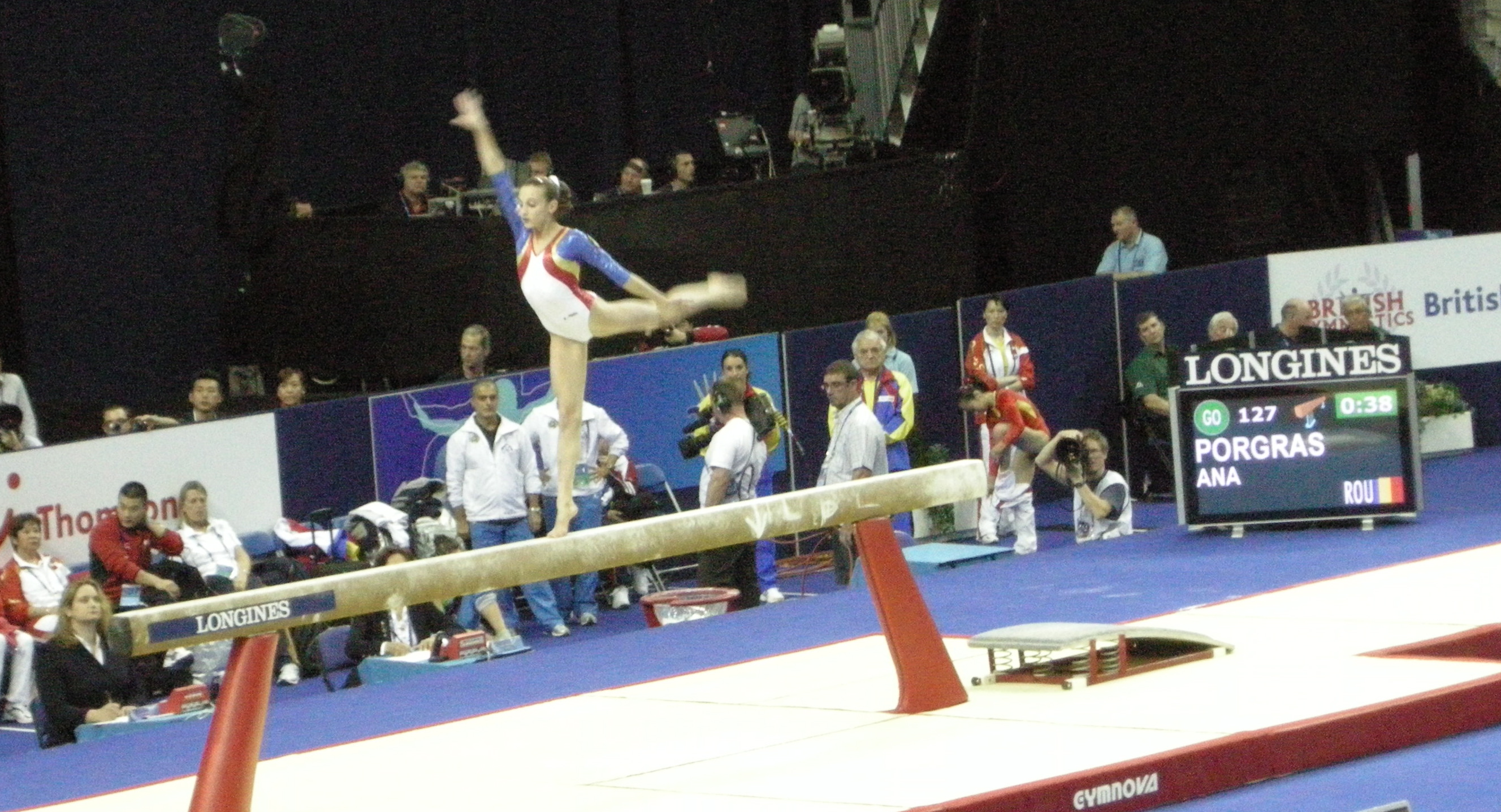
Porgras on the balance beam during the beam finals at the 2009 World Championships.

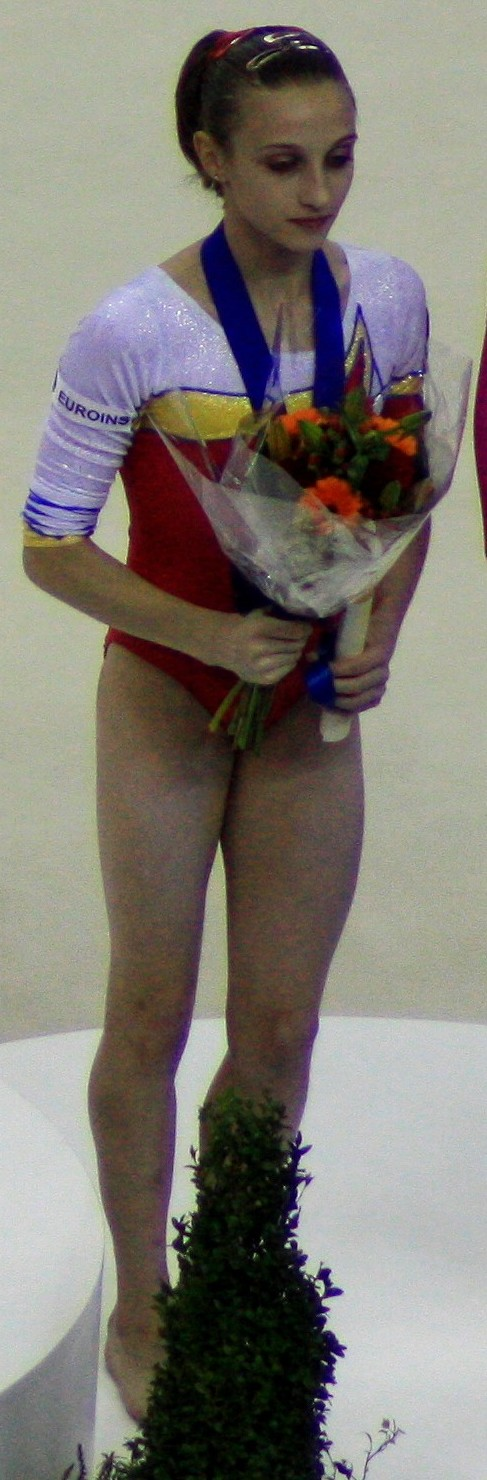
Porgras at the 2009 World Championships uneven bars podium

Not yet fully recovered after knee surgery, Porgras missed the 2009 European Championships. However, she had a promising senior debut at the 2009 World Championships in London. She qualified first on balance beam, second in the individual all-around, third on floor, and seventh on uneven bars. Falls from balance beam in the all-around and balance beam finals prevented her from winning medals in these events, placing seventh all-around and on balance beam. However, she did end her first World Championships experience with a bronze medal on the uneven bars (tied with USA's Rebecca Bross). She also tied for fifth place with Bross on floor. Later that year, Porgras had an excellent showing at the DTB Cup in Stuttgart by winning the gold medal on balance beam.

=== 2010 ===
Still struggling with injuries, Porgras was a member of the team at the 2010 European Championships. She helped the team qualify in second place by competing on balance beam and uneven bars. Individually, she qualified first on beam and seventh on bars. She helped her team win the bronze medal by earning the top mark of the day on beam (14.800) and by scoring 13.700 on uneven bars. During the team finals, Porgras suffered an injury from her balance beam dismount, which forced her to withdraw from the beam and uneven bars finals. After her return to Romania, she was diagnosed with a crack in her right fibula. In September she made a successful comeback at the Ghent World Cup, winning the gold medal on balance beam and a silver medal on uneven bars. One week later she defended her all-around title at the Romanian National Championships and also won gold on balance beam and bronze on floor.

In October she was selected in the national team for the 2010 World Championships in Rotterdam. Here she helped her team to place fourth in the team finals by performing on beam, floor and uneven bars. Individually, she placed fifth all around and on uneven bars, respectively, and won the gold medal on balance beam over Rebecca Bross and defending champion Deng Linlin. Porgras was the Romanian women's first world champion since Andreea Răducan won beam and floor in 2001.

=== 2011 ===
In April, at the 2011 European Championships Porgras competed on two events only (beam and uneven bars) and failed to make the finals. However, in August 2011 she had a good showing at the Romanian National Championships, winning her third consecutive all-around national title. After a good performance at two friendly meets in Germany and Great Britain, Porgras was selected to the team for the 2011 World Championships. In the qualification day she had a weak performance, grabbing the beam on her switch ring and falling on her double layout dismount on uneven bars, failing to make the event finals. However, in the team finals competition she helped Romania place fourth by receiving the highest marks on beam (15.300) and uneven bars (14.066) among her team. Individually, she managed a good performance in the all-around final, but she only placed sixth due to small mistakes on floor and the low difficulty of her vault exercise. She was awarded one of the two Longines Prize for Elegance in 2011.

After injuring her elbow during a training camp in France she announced her retirement from gymnastics in January 2012, only seven months away from the 2012 Olympic Games in London, England.

== Competitive history ==
Year	Event	Team	AA	VT	UB	BB	FX
2007	Elite Gym Massilia	3rd place, bronze medalist(s)	7	5	8	1st place, gold medalist(s)	
2008	European Championships (Junior)	4	9			1st place, gold medalist(s)	
2009	Stuttgart World Cup					1st place, gold medalist(s)	
2009	World Championships		7		3rd place, bronze medalist(s)	7	5
2010	European Championships	3rd place, bronze medalist(s)					
2010	Ghent World Cup				2nd place, silver medalist(s)	1st place, gold medalist(s)	
2010	Romanian National Championships		1st place, gold medalist(s)			1st place, gold medalist(s)	3rd place, bronze medalist(s)
2010	SUI-GER-ROU Friendly	1st place, gold medalist(s)	1st place, gold medalist(s)				
2010	World Championships	4	5		5	1st place, gold medalist(s)	
2011	Romanian National Championships		1st place, gold medalist(s)				
2011	SUI-GER-ROU Friendly	1st place, gold medalist(s)	1st place, gold medalist(s)				
2011	World Championships	4	6				
