= Eline Vandersteen =

Belgian artistic gymnast (born 1995)

- Born: 19 June 1995 (age 31)

Gymnastics career
- Discipline: Women's artistic gymnastics
- Country represented: Belgium (2014)

Eline Vandersteen (born 19 June 1995) is a Belgian female artistic gymnast, representing her nation at international competitions.

She competed at world championships, including the 2014 World Artistic Gymnastics Championships in Nanning, China.
