= Sophia Serseri =

French gymnast

- Born: December 1, 1995 (age 30) Chenôve, France
- Height: 1.58 m (5 ft 2 in)

Gymnastics career
- Country represented: France
- Club: Alliance Dijon Gym 21
- Head coach: Eric Demay
- Assistant coach: Cecile Demay

Sophia Serseri (born 1 December 1995) is a French gymnast. She competed for the national team at the 2012 Summer Olympics. She later worked as an au pair in the United States.
