= Mariana Bitang =

Coach of Romanian national artistic gymnastics team

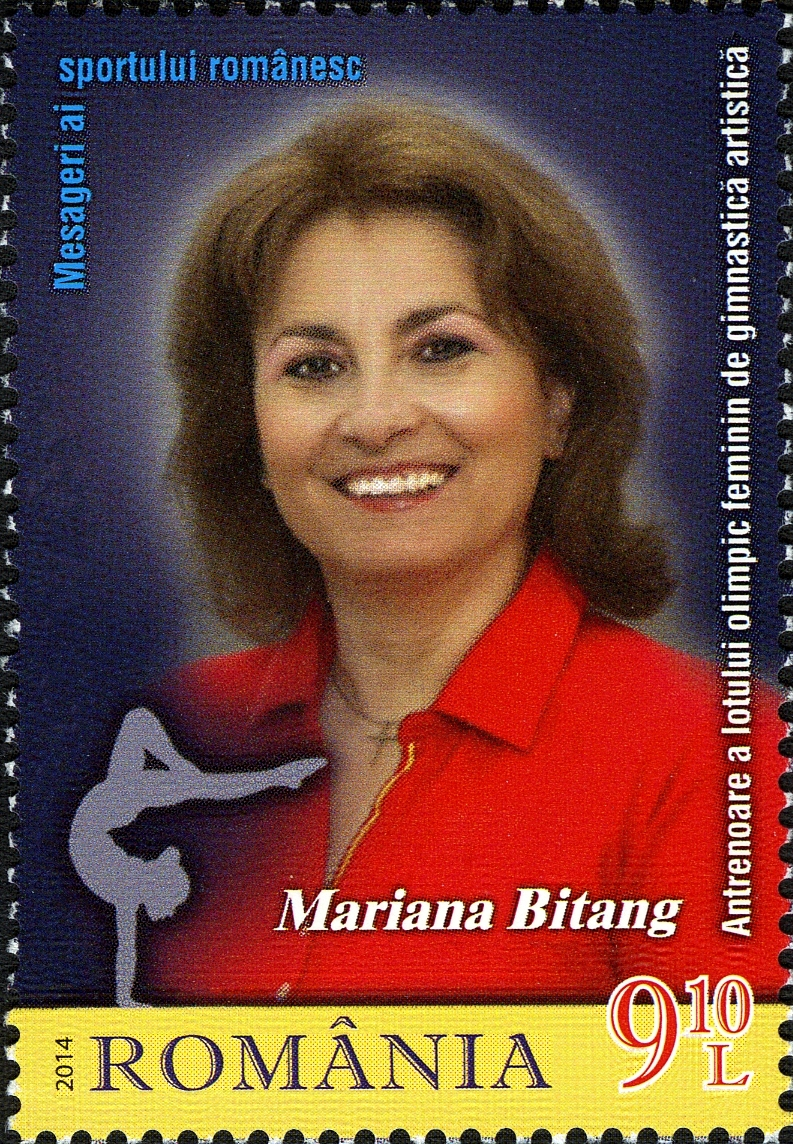

Mariana Bitang (born August 3, 1962, in Râmnicu Sărat) is a coach for the Romanian national women's artistic gymnastics team. Along with her partner, Octavian Bellu, she helped Romania win five consecutive team gold medals at the World Championships from 1994 to 2001 and team gold medals at the 2000 and 2004 Summer Olympics. In 2005, Bitang retired from coaching and became an adviser to Romanian President Traian Băsescu. She and Bellu began coaching the women's team again in 2010.
