= 2009 FIG Artistic Gymnastics World Cup series =

International gymnastics competition series

FIG Artistic Gymnastics World Cup series
- Location: various — see locations
- Date: March 6 – November 13, 2009 see schedule

The 2009 FIG Artistic Gymnastics World Cup series was a series of stages where events in men's and women's artistic gymnastics were contested. For the first time since the creation of the World Cup, no World Cup Final event was held; this makes 2009 the first year when the World Cup was competed as a yearly series of stages.

== World Cup stages ==
| Date | Event | Location |
|---|---|---|
| March 6–8 | Artistic FIG World Cup Cat. B | Montreal, Canada |
| March 20–22 | 33rd Turnier der Meister Cat. B | Cottbus, Germany |
| April 17–19 | 42nd Salamun Memorial Cat. B | Maribor, Slovenia |
| May 15–17 | Glasgow Grand Prix Cat. A | Glasgow, United Kingdom |
| May 29–30 | World Stars Cat. A | Moscow, Russia |
| September 28–30 | 2nd Artistic FIG World Cup Cat. A | Doha, Qatar |
| November 6–8 | Artistic FIG World Cup Cat. A | Osijek, Croatia |
| November 11–13 | EnBW World Cup Cat. A | Stuttgart, Germany |

== Medalists ==
=== Men ===
| Competition | Event | Gold | Silver | Bronze |
| Montreal | Floor exercise | (Romania) Razvan Selariu | (Canada) Nathan Gafuik | (Romania) Marius Berbecar |
| Montreal | Floor exercise | (Romania) Razvan Selariu | (Canada) Nathan Gafuik | (Slovenia) Rok Klavora |
| Montreal | Pommel horse | (Hungary) Krisztián Berki | (France) Cyril Tommasone | (Belgium) Donna-Donny Truyens |
| Montreal | Rings | (France) Danny Pinheiro Rodrigues | (Romania) Robert Stănescu | (Japan) Ken'ya Kobayashi |
| Montreal | Vault | (Romania) Ilie Daniel Popescu | (Japan) Koji Yamamuro | (Canada) Nathan Gafuik |
| Montreal | Parallel bars | (Poland) Adam Kierzkowski | (Japan) Ken'ya Kobayashi | (Japan) Yosuke Hoshi |
| Montreal | Horizontal bar | (Croatia) Marijo Možnik | (Japan) Yosuke Hoshi | (France) Hamilton Sabot |
| Cottbus | Floor exercise | (Japan) Kohei Uchimura | (Brazil) Diego Hypólito | (Greece) Markousis Dimitrios |
| Cottbus | Pommel horse | (Belgium) Donna-Donny Truyens | (Germany) Robert Weber | (Slovenia) Sašo Bertoncelj |
| Cottbus | Rings | (Netherlands) Yuri van Gelder | (Greece) Dimosthenis Tampakos | (France) Danny Pinheiro Rodrigues |
| Cottbus | Vault | (Netherlands) Jeffrey Wammes | (Brazil) Diego Hypólito | (France) Benoit Caranobe |
| Cottbus | Parallel bars | (Slovenia) Mitja Petkovšek | (France) Yann Cucherat | (Japan) Kazuhito Tanaka |
| Cottbus | Parallel bars | (Slovenia) Mitja Petkovšek | (France) Yann Cucherat | (Switzerland) Nicolas Böschenstein |
| Cottbus | Horizontal bar | (France) Yann Cucherat | (Netherlands) Epke Zonderland | (Austria) Marco Baldauf |
| Maribor | Floor exercise | (Brazil) Diego Hypólito | (Israel) Alexander Shatilov | (Croatia) Filip Ude |
| Maribor | Pommel horse | (Belgium) Donna-Donny Truyens | (Slovenia) Sašo Bertoncelj | (Hungary) Zoltan Kalai |
| Maribor | Pommel horse | (Belgium) Donna-Donny Truyens | (Slovenia) Sašo Bertoncelj | (Russia) Andrey Perevoznikov |
| Maribor | Rings | (Russia) Konstantin Pluzhnikov | (Cyprus) Irodotos Georgallas | (Venezuela) Regulo Carmona |
| Maribor | Vault | (Kazakhstan) Stanislav Valiyev | (Poland) Marek Lyszczarz | (Finland) Tomi Tuuha |
| Maribor | Parallel Bars | (Slovenia) Mitja Petkovšek | (Poland) Adam Kierzkowski | (Netherlands) Epke Zonderland |
| Maribor | Horizontal bar | (Netherlands) Epke Zonderland | (Slovenia) Aljaž Pegan | (Austria) Marco Baldauf |
| Glasgow | Floor exercise | (Brazil) Diego Hypólito | (United Kingdom) Kristian Thomas | (Israel) Alexander Shatilov |
| Glasgow | Pommel horse | (United Kingdom) Louis Smith | (Hungary) Krisztián Berki | (United Kingdom) Daniel Keatings |
| Glasgow | Rings | (Netherlands) Yuri van Gelder | (Jordan) Ali Al-Asi | (Russia) Konstantin Pluzhnikov |
| Glasgow | Vault | (Brazil) Diego Hypólito | (North Korea) Ri Se-gwang | (Netherlands) Jeffrey Wammes |
| Glasgow | Parallel Bars | (North Korea) Kim Jin-hyok | (Slovakia) Samuel Piasecký | (Slovenia) Mitja Petkovšek |
| Glasgow | Horizontal bar | (Netherlands) Epke Zonderland | (Slovenia) Aljaž Pegan | (Netherlands) Jeffrey Wammes |
| Moscow | Floor exercise | (Brazil) Diego Hypólito | (Russia) Anton Golotsutskov | (Israel) Alexander Shatilov |
| Moscow | Pommel horse | (Hungary) Krisztián Berki | (Australia) Prashanth Sellathurai | (Russia) Andrey Perevoznikov |
| Moscow | Rings | (Netherlands) Yuri van Gelder | (Russia) Konstantin Pluzhnikov | (Russia) Aleksandr Balandin |
| Moscow | Vault | (Russia) Anton Golotsutskov | (Netherlands) Jeffrey Wammes | (Latvia) Evgeni Sapronenko |
| Moscow | Parallel Bars | (Slovenia) Mitja Petkovšek | (United States) Raj Bhavsar | (Netherlands) Epke Zonderland |
| Moscow | Horizontal bar | (Netherlands) Epke Zonderland | (Slovenia) Aljaž Pegan | (Belarus) Aliaksandr Tsarevich |
| Doha | Floor exercise | (Croatia) Tomislav Markovic | (Greece) Eleftherios Kosmidis | (France) Thomas Bouhail |
| Doha | Pommel horse | (France) Cyril Tommasone | (Russia) Andrey Perevoznikov | (Slovenia) Sašo Bertoncelj |
| Doha | Rings | (France) Danny Pinheiro Rodrigues | (Italy) Matteo Angioletti | (Greece) Eleftherios Petrounias |
| Doha | Vault | (France) Thomas Bouhail | (Netherlands) Jeffrey Wammes | (Finland) Tomi Tuuha |
| Doha | Parallel Bars | (China) Dong Zhendong | (France) Yann Cucherat | (China) Guo Weiyang |
| Doha | Horizontal bar | (Slovenia) Aljaž Pegan | (Netherlands) Epke Zonderland | (China) Guo Weiyang |
| Osijek | Floor exercise | (Brazil) Diego Hypólito | (Croatia) Tomislav Markovic | (Israel) Alexander Shatilov |
| Osijek | Pommel horse | (China) Zhang Hongtao | (Slovenia) Sašo Bertoncelj | (Russia) Andrey Perevoznikov |
| Osijek | Rings | (China) Chen Yibing | (Russia) Konstantin Pluzhnikov | (Ukraine) Oleksandr Vorobiov |
| Osijek | Vault | (Romania) Flavius Koczi | (Ukraine) Oleksandr Yakukovsky | (Portugal) Luis Araujo |
| Osijek | Parallel Bars | (Romania) Marius Berbecar | (Poland) Adam Kierzkowski | (China) Wang Guanyin |
| Osijek | Horizontal bar | (Slovenia) Aljaž Pegan | (Netherlands) Epke Zonderland | (Croatia) Marijo Možnik |
| Stuttgart | Floor exercise | (Brazil) Diego Hypólito | (Israel) Alexander Shatilov | (Chile) Tomás González |
| Stuttgart | Pommel horse | (China) Zhang Hongtao | (Australia) Prashanth Sellathurai | (Hungary) Krisztián Berki |
| Stuttgart | Rings | (China) Chen Yibing | (Brazil) Arthur Zanetti | (Portugal) Gustavo Simões |
| Stuttgart | Vault | (Romania) Flavius Koczi | (Germany) Matthias Fahrig | (Latvia) Evgeni Sapronenko |
| Stuttgart | Parallel Bars | (China) Wang Guanyin | (France) Hamilton Sabot | (Germany) Marcel Nguyen |
| Stuttgart | Horizontal bar | (Netherlands) Epke Zonderland | (China) Zhang Chenglong | (Croatia) Marijo Možnik |

=== Women ===
| Competition | Event | Gold | Silver | Bronze |
| Montreal | Vault | (Canada) Charlotte Mackie | (Puerto Rico) Marie-Carmen Rivera | None awarded |
| Montreal | Uneven bars | (United States) Samantha Shapiro | (France) Marine Petit | (Canada) Sydney Sawa |
| Montreal | Balance beam | (United States) Mattie Larson | (France) Marine Petit | (Canada) Charlotte Mackie |
| Montreal | Floor exercise | (United States) Mattie Larson | (Canada) Charlotte Mackie | (Canada) Sydney Sawa |
| Cottbus | Vault | (Switzerland) Ariella Käslin | (Belgium) Aagje Vanwalleghem | (Switzerland) Yasmin Zimmermann |
| Cottbus | Uneven Bars | (Germany) Anja Brinker | (Belgium) Aagje Vanwalleghem | (Brazil) Ethiene Franco |
| Cottbus | Balance beam | (Poland) Marta Pihan-Kulesza | (Netherlands) Lieke Wevers | (China) Hu Yuhong |
| Cottbus | Floor exercise | (China) Sui Lu | (Germany) Kim Bui | (Slovenia) Adela Sajn |
| Maribor | Vault | (Russia) Anna Myzdrikova | (Russia) Ekaterina Kurbatova | (Finland) Annika Urvikko |
| Maribor | Uneven bars | (Russia) Ekaterina Kurbatova | (Russia) Kristina Goryunova | (Brazil) Ethiene Franco |
| Maribor | Balance beam | (Russia) Kristina Goryunova | (Brazil) Ana Claudia Silva | (Poland) Marta Pihan-Kulesza |
| Maribor | Floor exercise | (Russia) Kristina Goryunova | (Russia) Anna Myzdrikova | (Poland) Marta Pihan-Kulesza |
| Glasgow | Vault | (Russia) Ekaterina Kurbatova | (Russia) Yulia Berger | (Colombia) Jessica Gil Ortiz |
| Glasgow | Uneven bars | (United Kingdom) Elizabeth Tweddle | (United Kingdom) Rebecca Downie | (Russia) Ekaterina Kurbatova |
| Glasgow | Balance beam | (Spain) Ana Maria Izurieta | None awarded | (Romania) Gabriela Dragoi |
| Glasgow | Balance beam | (Netherlands) Sanne Wevers | None awarded | (Romania) Gabriela Dragoi |
| Glasgow | Floor exercise | (United Kingdom) Elizabeth Tweddle | (Russia) Anna Myzdrikova | (Spain) Ana Maria Izurieta |
| Moscow | Vault | (Russia) Ekaterina Kurbatova | (Russia) Yulia Berger | (Ukraine) Anna Kalashnyk |
| Moscow | Uneven bars | (Russia) Kristina Goryunova | None awarded | (Switzerland) Lucia Tacchelli |
| Moscow | Uneven bars | (Russia) Ekaterina Kurbatova | None awarded | (Switzerland) Lucia Tacchelli |
| Moscow | Balance beam | (Netherlands) Sanne Wevers | (Slovenia) Adela Sajn | (Brazil) Ethiene Franco |
| Moscow | Floor exercise | (Russia) Anna Myzdrikova | (Slovenia) Adela Sajn | (Brazil) Ethiene Franco |
| Doha | Vault | (Sweden) Ida Jonsson | (Slovenia) Tjaša Kysselef | (Croatia) Tijana Tkalcek |
| Doha | Uneven bars | (Germany) Anja Brinker | (France) Pauline Morel | (Germany) Marie-Sophie Hindermann |
| Doha | Balance beam | (China) Hu Yuhong | (Croatia) Tina Erceg | (Greece) Vasiliki Millousi |
| Doha | Floor exercise | (Poland) Marta Pihan-Kulesza | (Croatia) Tina Erceg | (Slovenia) Adela Sajn |
| Osijek | Vault | (Czech Republic) Jana Komrsková | (Croatia) Tijana Tkalcek | (Netherlands) Mayra Kroonen |
| Osijek | Uneven bars | (Netherlands) Mayra Kroonen | (Czech Republic) Jana Šikulová | (Israel) Valeria Maksyuta |
| Osijek | Balance beam | (China) Sui Lu | (Czech Republic) Jana Komrsková | (Croatia) Tina Erceg |
| Osijek | Floor exercise | (China) Sui Lu | (Portugal) Zoi Lima | (Croatia) Tina Erceg |
| Stuttgart | Vault | (Czech Republic) Jana Komrsková | (Switzerland) Ariella Käslin | (Germany) Kim Bui |
| Stuttgart | Uneven bars | (Germany) Kim Bui | (Poland) Marta Pihan-Kulesza | (Brazil) Bruna Leal |
| Stuttgart | Balance beam | (Romania) Ana Porgras | (Germany) Maike Roll | (Russia) Ksenia Semenova |
| Stuttgart | Floor exercise | (China) Sui Lu | (Germany) Kim Bui | (Germany) Elisabeth Seitz |

== See also ==
- 2009 FIG Rhythmic Gymnastics World Cup series
