= Donna-Donny Truyens =

Belgian gymnast (born 1989)

- Born: 31 March 1989 (age 37) Leuven, Belgium

Gymnastics career
- Discipline: Men's artistic gymnastics
- Country represented: Belgium
- Head coach: Dirk Van Meldert
- Retired: 2016
Medal record
Men's artistic gymnastics
Representing Belgium
Universiade
Silver medal – second place	2009 Belgrade	Pommel horse
Silver medal – second place	2011 Shenzhen	Pommel horse

Donna-Donny Truyens (born 31 March 1989) is a Belgian former artistic gymnast who competed primarily as a pommel horse specialist. He was the first Belgian male gymnast to reach an apparatus final at the World Championships and at the European Championships.

== Gymnastics career ==
Truyens began gymnastics at six years old in his hometown, Kessel-Lo. When he was 12, he moved away from home to train with the national team in Ghent. At the 2006 Junior European Championships, he placed fifth in the pommel horse final.

Truyens began competing at the senior level in 2007 and won a silver medal on the pommel horse at the Ostrava World Cup. That year, he also became Belgium's first apparatus finalist at the European Men's Artistic Gymnastics Championships when he placed fifth on the pommel horse. He also advanced into the pommel horse final at the 2008 European Championships, finishing sixth.

At the 2009 Montreal World Cup, Truyens won the pommel horse bronze medal behind Krisztián Berki. Then at the 2009 Summer Universiade, he won the silver medal behind Berki. At the 2010 World Championships in Rotterdam, Truyens became the first Belgian ever to qualify for a final when he came fifth in the qualifications for the pommel horse. He went on to place seventh in the final.

Truyens won the pommel horse silver medal at the 2011 Summer Universiade. At the 2012 Ostrava World Cup, he won a silver medal behind Andrey Likhavitski. He then won the gold medal at the 2013 Cottbus World Cup. At the 2013 European Championships, he finished sixth in the pommel horse final. He then competed at the 2013 World Championships but did not advance into any finals.

At the 2015 Cottbus World Cup, Truyens won the pommel horse silver medal, behind Ukraine's Oleg Verniaiev. He was Belgium's alternate for the 2015 World Championships. He retired from gymnastics in 2016 and began working as a nurse at the Ghent University Hospital.
