= Cyril Tommasone =

French artistic gymnast

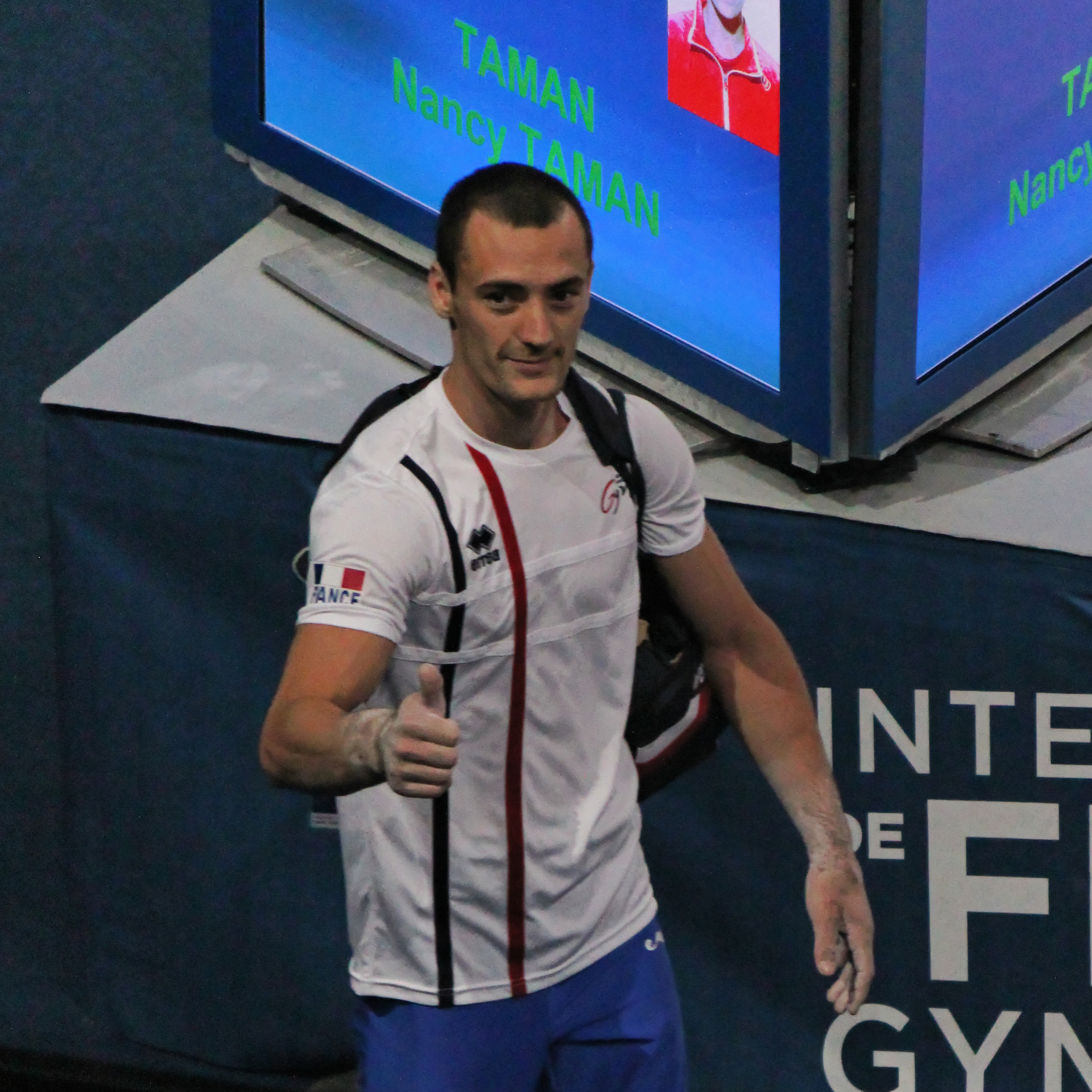
- Tommasone at the 2018 Paris World Challenge Cup

Personal information
- Born: 4 July 1987 (age 39) Villeurbanne, France
- Height: 171 cm (5 ft 7 in)

Gymnastics career
- Discipline: Men's artistic gymnastics
- Country represented: France
- Club: Convention Gymnique de Lyon
- Head coach: Anatoli Vorontzov
- Retired: 2024
Medal record
Representing France
World Championships
Silver medal – second place	2011 Tokyo	Pommel horse
Bronze medal – third place	2014 Nanning	Pommel horse
European Championships
Silver medal – second place	2011 Berlin	Pommel horse
Silver medal – second place	2019 Szczecin	Pommel horse
Bronze medal – third place	2010 Birmingham	Team
Bronze medal – third place	2018 Glasgow	Team
Mediterranean Games
Gold medal – first place	2018 Tarragona	Pommel horse
Bronze medal – third place	2018 Tarragona	Team
Summer Universiade
Gold medal – first place	2009 Belgrade	Parallel bars
FIG World Cup
Event	1st	2nd	3rd
Apparatus World Cup	2	2	1
World Challenge Cup	3	3	4
Total	5	5	5

Cyril Tommasone (born 4 July 1987) is a French former artistic gymnast. He is the 2011 World silver medalist and the 2014 World bronze medalist on the pommel horse. He is also a two-time European silver medalist on the pommel horse (2011, 2019) and a two-time European bronze medalist (2010, 2018) in the team event. He is a three-time Olympian (2012, 2016, 2020).

== Gymnastics career ==
Tommasone began gymnastics when he was seven years old.

=== 2009–2010 ===
At the 2009 Montreal World Cup, Tommasone won the pommel horse silver medal behind Krisztián Berki. He then won the gold medal at the Doha World Cup. At the 2009 Summer Universiade, he tied with Japan's Takuya Nakase for the parallel bars gold medal. He finished fourth in the pommel horse final at the 2009 World Championships.

Tommasone won pommel horse gold at the 2010 Paris World Cup. He helped France win the team bronze medal at the 2010 European Championships, and he finished eighth in the pommel horse final. At the 2010 World Championships, he finished 13th in the all-around final and fourth in the pommel horse final.

=== 2011–2013 ===
At the 2011 European Championships, Tommasone won the silver medal in the pommel horse final behind Krisztián Berki. He once again finished second to Berki at the 2011 World Championships. He helped the French team win the silver medal at the 2012 Olympic Test Event and qualify for the 2012 Summer Olympics. He was then selected to represent France at the 2012 Summer Olympics alongside Pierre-Yves Bény, Yann Cucherat, Gaël Da Silva, and Hamilton Sabot, and they finished eighth in the team final. He advanced into the all-around final and finished 16th. Then in the pommel horse final, he finished in fifth place with a score of 15.141. He had elbow surgery in 2013.

=== 2014–2015 ===
Tommasone helped the French team finish fifth at the 2014 European Championships. He helped the French team win a 2014 friendly meet against Belgium and Spain with the second highest score in the all-around. At the 2014 World Championships, he won a bronze medal on the pommel horse behind Krisztián Berki and Filip Ude. He also finished 20th in the all-around final. After the World Championships, he competed at the Toyota International and won the pommel horse bronze medal despite falling.

Tommasone dealt with a shoulder injury throughout the 2015 season. He won a pommel horse bronze medal at the 2015 Cottbus World Challenge Cup. At the 2015 World Championships, he helped the French team finish 10th in the qualifications.

=== 2016–2018 ===
At the 2016 Olympic Test Event, Tommasone helped France secure the final team berth for the 2016 Summer Olympics. He then helped the French team place sixth in the team final at the 2016 European Championships, and he finished eighth in the pommel horse final. He tied with Robert Seligman for the pommel horse silver medal at the Varna World Challenge Cup. He represented France at the 2016 Summer Olympics. He finished fourth in the pommel horse final and was one-tenth of a point away from the bronze medal.

Tommasone won pommel horse silver medals at both the 2017 Varna and Paris World Challenge Cup. He helped France win the team bronze medal at the 2018 European Championships. At the 2018 Mediterranean Games, he helped France win another team bronze, and he won the pommel horse title. He won the gold medal on the pommel horse at the 2018 Paris World Challenge Cup. Then at the 2018 World Championships, he fell in the pommel horse final and finished eighth.

=== 2019–2021 ===
Tommasone won the pommel horse silver medal at the 2019 Baku World Cup. At the 2019 European Championships, he won the silver medal behind Max Whitlock. He finished sixth in the pommel horse final at the 2019 World Championships. As the second-highest-placing gymnast who was not part of a qualified team, Tommasone earned an individual berth for the 2020 Summer Olympics.

During lockdowns due to the COVID-19 pandemic, he practiced with a pommel horse in his basement. At the Olympic Games, he fell off the pommel horse during the qualification round and did not advance into the final. He also fell at the 2021 World Championships and did not advance into the final.

=== 2022–2024 ===
Tommasone won the pommel horse bronze medal at the 2022 Baku World Cup. He had shoulder surgery in June 2022. After missing out on qualifying for the 2024 Summer Olympics, he competed at the French Championships, won his tenth pommel horse national title, and announced his retirement. He began coaching at a gymnastics club in Lyon.
