= Gymnastics at the 2016 Summer Olympics – Men's pommel horse =

Olympic gymnastics event

Men's pommel horse at the Games of the XXXI Olympiad
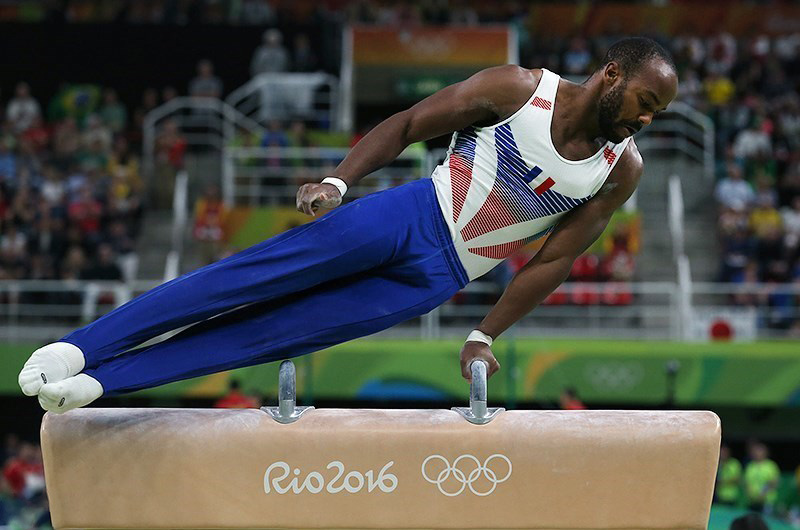
- Axel Augis competing on the pommel horse in the qualifying round
- Venue: HSBC Arena
- Dates: 6 August (qualifying); 14 August 2016 (final)
- Competitors: 71 from 36 nations
- Winning score: 15.966

Medalists
1st place, gold medalist(s)		Max Whitlock; Great Britain
2nd place, silver medalist(s)		Louis Smith; Great Britain
3rd place, bronze medalist(s)		Alexander Naddour; United States

The men's pommel horse competition at the 2016 Summer Olympics was held at the HSBC Arena on 6 and 14 August. There were 71 competitors from 36 nations. The event was won by Max Whitlock of Great Britain, the nation's first gold medal in the men's pommel horse (and second in any men's gymnastic competition, preceded shortly by Whitlock's win in the floor exercise). The nation finished 1–2 in the event, with Louis Smith repeating as silver medalist. It was the first time any nation had earned the top two spots in the event since the Soviet Union swept the medals (something no longer possible) in 1952. Smith was the second man to win three medals in the event, while Whitlock was the 11th to win two medals.

The medals were presented by Bernard Rajzman IOC member, Brazil and Luo Chaoyi, FIG Executive Committee Member.

== Background ==
This was the 24th appearance of the event, which is one of the five apparatus events held every time there were apparatus events at the Summer Olympics (no apparatus events were held in 1900, 1908, 1912, or 1920). Five of the eight finalists from 2012 returned: silver medalist Louis Smith and bronze medalist Max Whitlock of Great Britain, fifth-place finisher Cyril Tommasone of France, seventh-place finisher David Belyavskiy of Russia, and eighth-place finisher Vid Hidvegi of Hungary. Whitlock was the reigning (2015) world champion, with Smith the runner-up.

Cyprus, Turkey, and Monaco each made their debut in the men's pommel horse. The United States made its 22nd appearance, most of any nation; the Americans had missed only the inaugural 1896 pommel horse and the boycotted 1980 Games.

== Qualification ==
Qualification for the men's artistic gymnastics in 2008 was based primarily on the 2015 World Artistic Gymnastics Championships. The top 8 teams at the world championships could send a full team of 5 gymnasts to the Olympics. The next 8 teams (#9 through #16) competed in the 2012 Gymnastics Olympic Test Event, with the top 4 of those teams also qualifying a team of 5 gymnasts for the Olympics. The individual apparatus medalists from the World Championships also qualified, if their nation had not already qualified a team. There were places reserved for host country and continental representation, and the Tripartite Commission made an invitation. The quota of 98 gymnasts was then filled through the individual all-around rankings at the Test Event, with each nation able to qualify only one gymnast in that manner (though this one gymnast could be added to the world championship apparatus medalists—for example, Romania qualified Marian Drăgulescu as silver medalist in the vault and Andrei Muntean through the Test Event).

== Competition format ==
The top 8 qualifiers in the qualification phase (limit two per NOC), based on combined score of each apparatus, advanced to the individual all-around final. The finalists performed on each apparatus again. Qualification scores were then ignored, with only final round scores counting.

== Schedule ==
All times are Brasília Time (UTC-03:00)

Date	Time	Round
Wednesday, 10 August 2016		Qualifying
Sunday, 14 August 2016	15:34	Final

== Results ==
=== Qualifying ===
The gymnasts who ranked top eight qualified for final round. In case of there were more than two gymnasts in same NOC, the last ranked among them would not qualify to final round. The next best ranked gymnast would qualify instead.

=== Final ===
Rank	Gymnast	Nation	D Score	E Score	Pen.	Total
1st place, gold medalist(s)	Max Whitlock	Great Britain	7.200	8.766		15.966
2nd place, silver medalist(s)	Louis Smith	Great Britain	6.900	8.933		15.833
3rd place, bronze medalist(s)	Alexander Naddour	United States	6.800	8.900		15.700
4	Cyril Tommasone	France	6.900	8.700		15.600
5	David Belyavskiy	Russia	6.600	8.800		15.400
6	Nikolai Kuksenkov	Russia	6.800	8.433		15.233
7	Harutyun Merdinyan	Armenia	6.400	8.533		14.933
8	Oleg Verniaiev	Ukraine	5.700	6.700		12.400
