= Gymnastics at the 2012 Summer Olympics – Men's pommel horse =

Olympic gymnastics event

Men's pommel horse at the Games of the XXX Olympiad
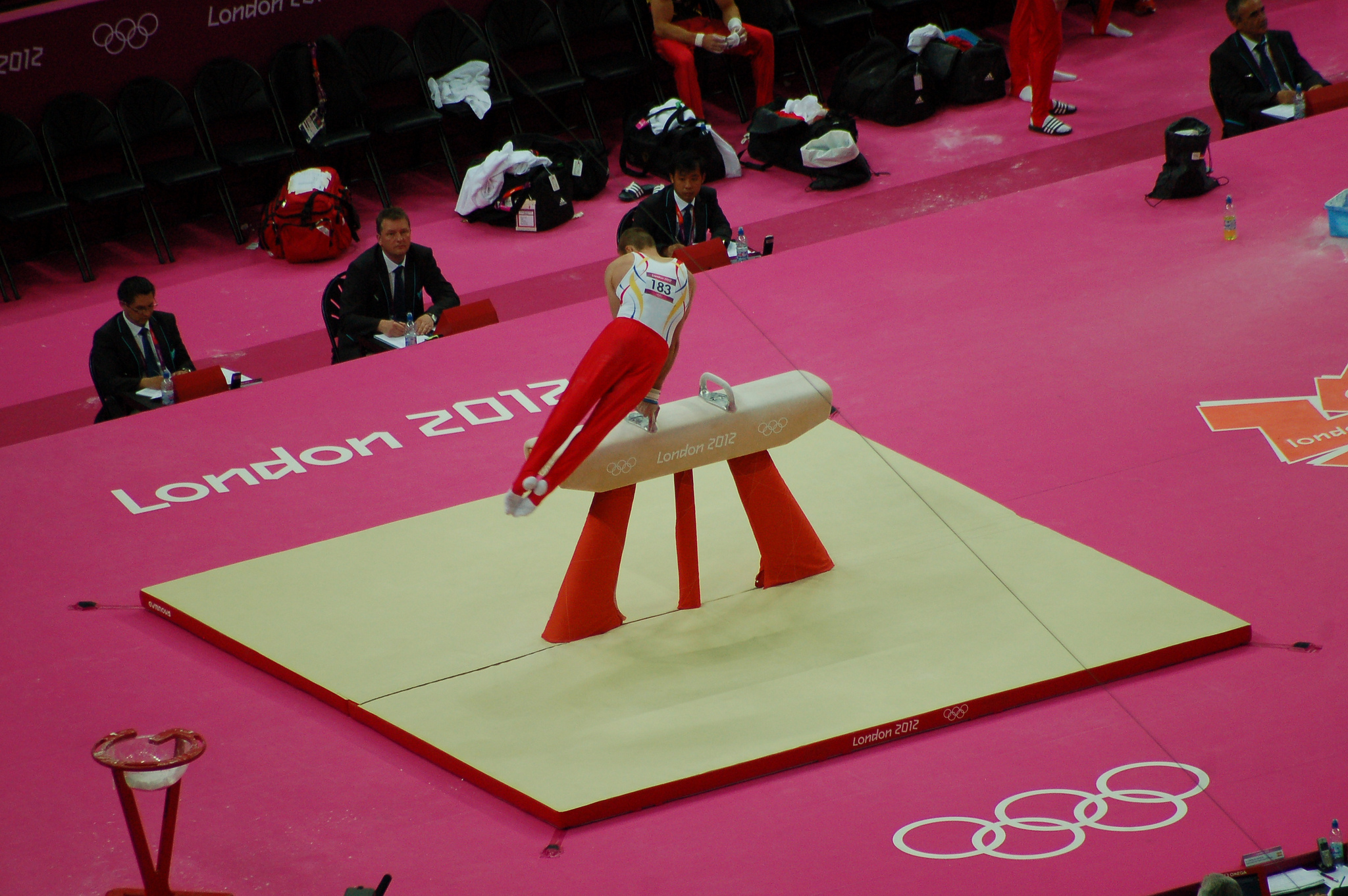
- Ovidiu Buidoso on the pommel horse in the qualifying round
- Venue: The O2 Arena
- Dates: 28 July (qualifying); 5 August (final)
- Competitors: 69 from 32 nations
- Winning score: 16.066

Medalists
1st place, gold medalist(s)		Krisztián Berki; Hungary
2nd place, silver medalist(s)		Louis Smith; Great Britain
3rd place, bronze medalist(s)		Max Whitlock; Great Britain

Official Video Highlights

The men's pommel horse competition at the 2012 Olympic Games was held at the North Greenwich Arena on 28 July and 5 August. It included 69 competitors from 32 nations.

Krisztián Berki of Hungary won the gold medal. It was Hungary's first victory in the pommel horse since 1988 and fifth overall, tying the Soviet Union for the most all-time. Great Britain's Louis Smith and Max Whitlock won silver and bronze, respectively. Smith, who had won bronze in 2008, was the 10th man to win multiple medals in the event. It was the first time since 1984 that one nation earned multiple medals in the pommel horse.

== Background ==
This was the 23rd appearance of the event in the Olympics. Three of the eight finalists from 2008 returned: silver medalist Filip Ude of Croatia, bronze medalist Louis Smith of Great Britain, and sixth-place finisher Kim Ji-hoon of South Korea. Krisztián Berki of Hungary had won the last two world championships, in 2010 and 2011. Smith had also medaled at both of those world championships, and Cyril Tommasone of France was the runner-up in 2011.

Azerbaijan, Hong Kong, and Lithuania each made their debut in the men's pommel horse. The United States made its 21st appearance, the most of any nation.

== Competition format ==
The top eight competitors in the qualification phase (with a limit of two per country) advanced to the apparatus final. Qualification scores were then erased, with only final-round scores counting.

== Final results ==
Rank	Gymnast	Nation	D Score	E Score	Pen.	Total
1st place, gold medalist(s)	Krisztián Berki	Hungary	6.900	9.166		16.066*
2nd place, silver medalist(s)	Louis Smith	Great Britain	7.000	9.066		16.066*
3rd place, bronze medalist(s)	Max Whitlock	Great Britain	6.600	9.000		15.600
4	Alberto Busnari	Italy	6.600	8.800		15.400
5	Cyril Tommasone	France	6.500	8.641		15.141
6	Vitaliy Nakonechnyi	Ukraine	6.300	8.466		14.766
7	David Belyavskiy	Russia	6.300	8.433		14.733
8	Vid Hidvégi	Hungary	6.300	8.000		14.300

*The tie for first was broken by the execution score; Berki's E score of 9.166 was higher than Smith's E score of 9.066.
