= South Essex Gymnastics Club =

British Gymnastics club in Basildon, Essex

- Full name: South Essex Gymnastics Club
- Short name: SEGC
- Sport: Artistic gymnastics
- Founded: 1992
- Location: Basildon, Essex
- Home ground: Basildon Sporting Village
- Head coach: Scott Hann; Anthony Wise (MAG); Ross Falsetta (WAG)
- Members: Max Whitlock (formerly); Georgia-Mae Fenton; Courtney Tulloch
- Website: www.southessexgymnasticsclub.com

South Essex Gymnastics Club is a British artistic gymnastics club based in Basildon, Essex. The club emerged through the merger of Basildon, Castle Point, and Magna Carta Gymnastics Clubs. It has trained many British men's and women's national team members including 6 time Olympic medallist Max Whitlock.

The club trains at Basildon Sporting Village which served as a pre-games training venue for the 2012 London Olympics and hosted competitors from several international teams including Ireland, Holland, New Zealand, Austria, Guatemala, Czech Republic, and Japan.

== Notable gymnasts ==
=== MAG ===
- Max Whitlock - 6 x Olympic medallist (3 gold) and 8 x World medallist (3 gold). The most successful British male artistic gymnast in history.
- Courtney Tulloch - 2 x Bronze World medallist and 8 x European medallist.
- Brinn Bevan - 2016 Olympian, 2015 World silver medallist and 2015 European bronze medallist.
- Danny Lawrence - 2010 Commonwealth silver medallist.
- Reiss Beckford - 3 x Commonwealth medallist.

=== WAG ===
- Georgia-Mae Fenton - 2024 Olympian, 2022 World silver medallist and 4 x European medallist.
- Amy Tinkler - 2016 Olympic bronze medallist and 2015 World bronze medallist.
- Shannon Archer - 2022 Commonwealth medallist for Scotland.
- Annika Reeder - 1996 and 2000 Olympian, 5 x Commonwealth medallist.
- Nicola Willis - 2004 Olympian and Commonwealth silver medallist.

== Competitive history ==
Competitive history of Park Wrekin at junior women's team competitions
Year	Competition	Team
2019	British Team Championships	2nd place, silver medalist(s)
2022	British Team Championships	8
2023	British Team Championships	4
2025	British Team Championships	6
