= Max Whitlock =

English artistic gymnast (born 1993)

Max Whitlock OBE
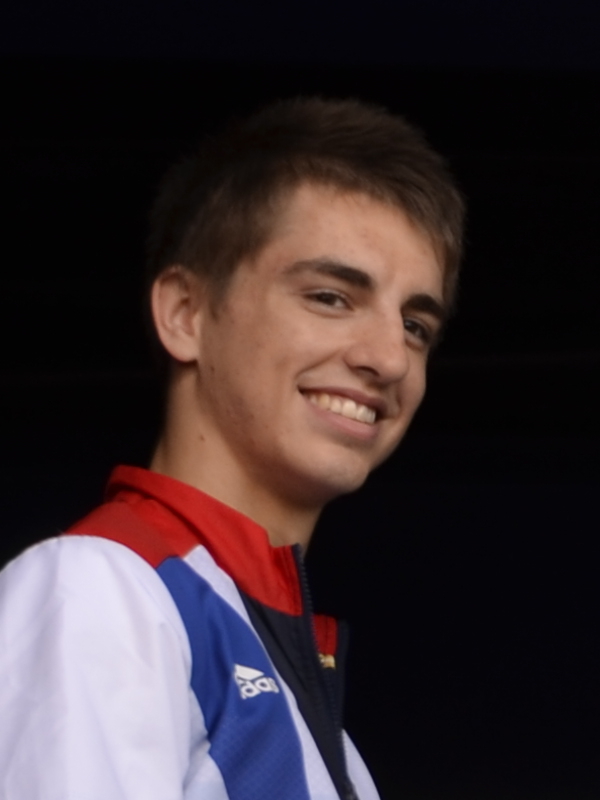
- Whitlock in 2012

Personal information
- Full name: Max Antony Whitlock
- Nickname: Maxi
- Born: 13 January 1993 (age 33) Hemel Hempstead, Hertfordshire, England
- Height: 167 cm (5 ft 6 in)

Gymnastics career
- Discipline: Men's artistic gymnastics
- Country represented: (United Kingdom) Great Britain; England; (2010–2024, 2026–present)
- Club: South Essex Gymnastics Club
- Head coach: Scott Hann
Medal record
Men's artistic gymnastics
Event	1st	2nd	3rd
Olympic Games	3	0	3
World Championships	3	5	0
European Championships	4	3	1
Commonwealth Games	4	4	2
Total	14	12	6
Representing Great Britain
Olympic Games
Gold medal – first place	2016 Rio de Janeiro	Floor exercise
Gold medal – first place	2016 Rio de Janeiro	Pommel horse
Gold medal – first place	2020 Tokyo	Pommel horse
Bronze medal – third place	2012 London	Team
Bronze medal – third place	2012 London	Pommel horse
Bronze medal – third place	2016 Rio de Janeiro	All-around
World Championships
Gold medal – first place	2015 Glasgow	Pommel horse
Gold medal – first place	2017 Montreal	Pommel horse
Gold medal – first place	2019 Stuttgart	Pommel horse
Silver medal – second place	2013 Antwerp	Pommel horse
Silver medal – second place	2014 Nanning	All-around
Silver medal – second place	2015 Glasgow	Team
Silver medal – second place	2015 Glasgow	Floor exercise
Silver medal – second place	2018 Doha	Pommel horse
European Championships
Gold medal – first place	2012 Montpellier	Team
Gold medal – first place	2013 Moscow	Floor exercise
Gold medal – first place	2014 Sofia	Pommel horse
Gold medal – first place	2019 Szczecin	Pommel horse
Silver medal – second place	2013 Moscow	All-around
Silver medal – second place	2014 Sofia	Team
Silver medal – second place	2018 Glasgow	Team
Bronze medal – third place	2013 Moscow	Pommel horse
Representing England
Commonwealth Games
Gold medal – first place	2014 Glasgow	Team
Gold medal – first place	2014 Glasgow	All-around
Gold medal – first place	2014 Glasgow	Floor exercise
Gold medal – first place	2018 Gold Coast	Team
Silver medal – second place	2010 Delhi	Team
Silver medal – second place	2010 Delhi	Pommel horse
Silver medal – second place	2014 Glasgow	Pommel horse
Silver medal – second place	2018 Gold Coast	Pommel horse
Bronze medal – third place	2010 Delhi	Horizontal bar
Bronze medal – third place	2014 Glasgow	Parallel bars
FIG World Cup
Event	1st	2nd	3rd
All-Around World Cup	1	0	0
World Cup	0	1	0
World Challenge Cup	0	1	1
Total	1	2	1
- Awards: Longines Prize for Elegance (2015)

Max Antony Whitlock (born 13 January 1993) is an English artistic gymnast. With fourteen medals and six titles in Olympic and World Championships, Whitlock is the most successful gymnast in British history. He is also the most successful pommel horse worker in Olympic Games history, with two gold medals and one bronze.

Whitlock is a six-time Olympic medallist (all-around, team, floor exercise and three times on his signature piece, pommel horse), winning three golds and three bronzes, and a five-time world medallist on the pommel horse with three gold and two silvers. He became Great Britain's first-ever Olympic gold medallist in artistic gymnastics when he won both the floor exercise and pommel horse at the 2016 Summer Olympics. He is a four-time European champion and a four-time Commonwealth Games champion representing England.

== Early life ==
Whitlock was born in Hemel Hempstead, Hertfordshire, on 13 January 1993. He was introduced to gymnastics by a friend from a swimming club when he was seven and joined the Sapphire School of Gymnastics in Hemel Hempstead. When he was twelve, his coach Klemen Bedenik returned to Slovenia, and Whitlock followed him to Maribor to continue training. He returned three months later and joined South Essex Gymnastics Club in Basildon, where he is coached by his brother-in-law Scott Hann. Whitlock's wife, Leah, has also worked as a coach at the club. He attended Longdean School in Hemel Hempstead.

== Gymnastics career ==
=== 2010–11 ===
Whitlock won gold on pommel horse and floor exercise and silver in the all-around at the 2010 Junior European Championships held in Birmingham. In October, he was part of the team that won the silver medal for England at the 2010 Commonwealth Games. He also won the silver medal on the pommel horse and a bronze medal on the horizontal bar.

Whitlock was an alternate for the British men's team at the 2011 World Championships in Tokyo.

=== 2012 ===
Whitlock was selected for the British team that competed at the Olympic Test Event, the final opportunity to qualify for the 2012 Olympic Games. The British team won the event and qualified as a team for the Olympic Games for the first time since 1992. He won the silver medal in the pommel horse final behind teammate Louis Smith. In March, he won the bronze medal on the pommel horse at the Cottbus World Challenge Cup. He competed with the British team that won the gold medal at the European Championships. This was the first time the British men's team had won team gold at a major championship. Individually, Whitlock qualified for the pommel horse final, where he finished in sixth place.

Whitlock represented Great Britain at the 2012 Summer Olympics in London alongside Smith, Sam Oldham, Daniel Purvis, and Kristian Thomas. The team initially finished second in the team final, but the Japanese team submitted an inquiry that raised their score, so the British team received the bronze medal. This was the first time the British men's team had won an Olympic medal since 1912. He also won the bronze medal in the pommel horse event final behind Hungary's Krisztián Berki and teammate Smith.

=== 2013 ===
Whitlock began the season at the Internationaux de France where he won the silver medal on the pommel horse behind Olympic champion Krisztián Berki. He then competed at the European Championships in Moscow. In the all-around final, he won the silver medal behind David Belyavskiy. He then won Great Britain's first European floor title by tying with Israel's Alexander Shatilov. Then in the pommel horse final, he won the bronze medal. At the Anadia World Challenge Cup, he was upset in the pommel horse final by Colombia's Jhonny Perez. At the World Championships, Whitlock finished fourth in the all-around final, only 0.300 behind the bronze medalist. Then in the pommel horse final, he tied for the silver medal with Mexico's Daniel Corral.

=== 2014 ===
At the European Championships in Sofia, Whitlock and his Great Britain teammates won the team silver medal behind Russia. In event finals, he won the gold medal in pommel horse ahead of the defending Olympic champion Krisztián Berki. He also finished fifth in the floor exercise final. At the 2014 Commonwealth Games, Whitlock and his England teammates won the team gold. In the all-around final, Whitlock won the gold medal with a score of 90.631 points. Whitlock won his third gold in the floor exercise final. He took silver in the pommel horse final and bronze in the parallel bars final.

Whitlock was chosen to compete for Great Britain at World Championships in Nanning, China. During the qualification round, he had a fall on the floor exercise and costly errors on the pommel horse. He did not qualify for any of the individual finals, including the all-around due to the two-per-country rule as he finished behind teammates Daniel Purvis and Nile Wilson. In the team final, he helped the British team finish fourth which was at the time Great Britain's best-ever team finish at the World Artistic Gymnastics Championships. After the team competition, Wilson pulled out of the all-around competition due to a wrist injury, allowing Whitlock to replace him in the final. He won the silver medal with a score of 90.473, just under a point and a half behind defending Olympic all-around champion Kohei Uchimura.

=== 2015 ===
Due to illness, Whitlock only competed on pommel horse at the British Championships, where he won the silver medal behind Louis Smith. After the competition, Whitlock was found to have been suffering from glandular fever. Despite this, Whitlock was chosen to compete at the European Championships, but he only competed on the floor and pommel horse. However, he did not qualify for any event finals. After the European Championships, his coach announced Whitlock would take a break from training to recover. In May, Whitlock announced on his Twitter he had returned to training.

Whitlock competed with the British men's team at the World Championships in Glasgow, Scotland. After some minor mistakes in the qualification rounds, he tied for a place in the final with teammate Nile Wilson, but with the tiebreaker rules applied, Whitlock won the place in the individual all-around final. The men's team, which included Kristian Thomas, Daniel Purvis, Louis Smith, Brinn Bevan, Nile Wilson and alternate James Hall, became the first British men's team to win a medal in the at a World Championships, winning silver behind Japan. During the all-around final, Whitlock finished fifth after falling off the horizontal bar. He won the silver medal on the floor exercise behind Kenzo Shirai. Then in the pommel horse final, he became the first British man ever to win a World Championship gold medal, by 0.100 over teammate Smith.

=== 2016 ===
Whitlock competed at the Glasgow World Cup and won the all-around with a total score of 89.299. He had the highest scores of the competition on floor and pommel horse, and he came second on vault and high bar. In May, Whitlock withdrew from the European Championships due to a virus.

On 12 July 2016, Whitlock was selected to represent Great Britain at the 2016 Summer Olympics, along with Louis Smith, Nile Wilson, Kristian Thomas and Brinn Bevan. The British team finished fourth in the team final. He won a bronze medal in the all-around final, Great Britain's first medal in this Olympic event for 108 years. He later went on to win the gold in the floor exercise, becoming the first British gymnast to win an individual Olympic gold medal. Within two hours, he won a second gold in the pommel horse. He took three months off from training after the Olympic Games.

=== 2017 ===
In March, Whitlock announced that he would take six months off from competition, missing the London World Cup and the European Championships. He returned to competition at the World Championships but only competed on the pommel horse and floor exercise. Although he fell on the floor exercise during the qualification round, he qualified for the pommel horse final. He became the first British gymnast to successfully defend a World title when he won the pommel horse final.

=== 2018 ===
At the 2018 Commonwealth Games, Whitlock was part of the team that won gold in the team event. However, he failed to defend his individual titles in the Games; he sat out the individual all-around competition, finished sixth on the floor, and won silver on the pommel horse behind Rhys McClenaghan. At the 2018 European Championships in Glasgow, Whitlock won a silver as part of the British team. However, an error in his routine on the pommel horse caused him to finish seventh in the event final. At the 2018 World Championships in Doha, Qatar, Whitlock was a member of the British team that finished fifth. He failed to win a third consecutive pommel gold at the World Championship, despite receiving the same score of 15.166 as the winner Xiao Ruoteng. He lost the tiebreaker and finished in second place due to a lower execution mark.

=== 2019 ===
After failing to win gold at the European Championships in 2018, Whitlock regained his gold on pommel horse at the 2019 European Championships held in Szczecin, Poland. At the World Championships in Stuttgart, Whitlock fell on the pommel horse during the team final where the British team finished fifth. In the event finals, he recovered from an early mistake to win his third World gold on the pommel horse.

=== 2021 ===
Whitlock returned to competition at the European Championships, his first competition in 18 months due to the COVID-19 pandemic. However, he fell off the pommel horse during the qualification round and missed the final. At the 2020 Summer Olympics in Tokyo, Japan, Whitlock competed for Great Britain alongside Joe Fraser, James Hall, and Giarnni Regini-Moran. The team took fourth place with a score of 255.76. Whitlock opted not to defend the floor exercise title, concentrating instead on the pommel horse, which he went on to win with a score of 15.583.

=== 2022–23 ===
Whitlock took over one year off from training after the Olympic Games and did not compete at the 2022 Commonwealth Games or the 2022 World Championships. Instead, he joined the BBC's coverage of the gymnastics events at the Birmingham 2022 Commonwealth Games. He was scheduled to return to competition at the 2023 European Championships, but he had to withdraw due to an injury. He was selected for the 2023 World Championships team alongside Jake Jarman, James Hall, Harry Hepworth and Courtney Tulloch. The team finished fourth in the team final. During the pommel horse final, Whitlock fell and finished fifth.

=== 2024 ===
In 2024 Whitlock announced that Paris 2024 would be his final Olympics. In June he was officially selected to represent Great Britain at the 2024 Summer Olympics alongside Joe Fraser, Jake Jarman, Harry Hepworth, and Luke Whitehouse. They came fourth in the team competition. Whitlock qualified for the pommel horse final where he was attempting to become the first male gymnast to medal at four successive games on a single apparatus but he finished fourth. Following the Olympics, Whitlock retired from gymnastics competition.

=== 2025–2026 ===
On 24 November 2025, Whitlock announced he was coming out of retirement and aiming for the 2028 Summer Olympics in Los Angeles.

In January 2026, Whitlock was named in the British senior squad. He was selected to represent Team England at the 2026 Commonwealth Games in Glasgow alongside Adam Tobin, Alex Yolshin-Cash, Joshua Nathan, and Luke Whitehouse. He later withdrew from the competition due to a hand injury and was replaced by Gabriel Langton.

== Awards and honours ==
Whitlock finished seventh in the public vote for the 2014 and 2016 BBC Sports Personality of the Year awards, and he finished eighth in 2015. He received the Longines Prize for Elegance at the 2015 World Championships in Glasgow, Scotland.

Whitlock was appointed Member of the Order of the British Empire (MBE) in the 2017 New Year Honours and Officer of the Order of the British Empire (OBE) in the 2022 New Year Honours, both for services to gymnastics.

In February 2021, Whitlock was announced as an ambassador for the 2022 World Championships in Liverpool, England.

== Personal life ==
Whitlock married Leah Hickton in July 2017. The following year, they set up the Max Whitlock Gymnastics Club with locations in Colchester and Southend. Their first child, a daughter named Willow, was born in February 2019.

In January 2020, Whitlock's book The Whitlock Workout: Get Fit and Healthy in Minutes was published by Headline.

== Competitive history ==
Competitive history of Max Whitlock
Year	Event	Team	AA	FX	PH	SR	VT	PB	HB
2010
2010	Junior European Championships		2nd place, silver medalist(s)	1st place, gold medalist(s)	1st place, gold medalist(s)	6			
2010	Commonwealth Games	2nd place, silver medalist(s)	4		2nd place, silver medalist(s)				3rd place, bronze medalist(s)
2012	Olympic Test Event	1st place, gold medalist(s)	23		2nd place, silver medalist(s)				
2012	Cottbus World Challenge Cup				3rd place, bronze medalist(s)				
2012	European Championships	1st place, gold medalist(s)	—N/a		6				
2012	Olympic Games	3rd place, bronze medalist(s)			3rd place, bronze medalist(s)				
2013	Internationaux de France				2nd place, silver medalist(s)				
2013	European Championships	—N/a	2nd place, silver medalist(s)	1st place, gold medalist(s)	3rd place, bronze medalist(s)				
2013	Anadia World Challenge Cup				2nd place, silver medalist(s)				
2013	World Championships	—N/a	4		2nd place, silver medalist(s)				
2014
2014	European Championships	2nd place, silver medalist(s)	—N/a	5	1st place, gold medalist(s)				
2014	Commonwealth Games	1st place, gold medalist(s)	1st place, gold medalist(s)	1st place, gold medalist(s)	2nd place, silver medalist(s)	5		3rd place, bronze medalist(s)	
2014	World Championships	4	2nd place, silver medalist(s)						
2015	British Championships				2nd place, silver medalist(s)				
2015	World Championships	2nd place, silver medalist(s)	5	2nd place, silver medalist(s)	1st place, gold medalist(s)				
2016	Glasgow World Cup		1st place, gold medalist(s)						
2016	Olympic Games	4	3rd place, bronze medalist(s)	1st place, gold medalist(s)	1st place, gold medalist(s)				
2017
2017	World Championships	—N/a			1st place, gold medalist(s)				
2018
2018	Commonwealth Games	1st place, gold medalist(s)		6	2nd place, silver medalist(s)				
2018	European Championships	2nd place, silver medalist(s)	—N/a		7				
2018	World Championships	5			2nd place, silver medalist(s)				
2019
2019	European Championships	—N/a			1st place, gold medalist(s)				
2019	World Championships	5			1st place, gold medalist(s)				
2021
2021	Olympic Games	4			1st place, gold medalist(s)				
2023
2023	World Championships	4			5				
2024
2024	Olympic Games	4			4				
2026	English Championships				1st place, gold medalist(s)			8	32
2026	Varna World Challenge Cup				8			7	
