= Gymnastics at the 2016 Summer Olympics – Men's floor =

Men's floor at the Games of the XXXI Olympiad
- Venue: HSBC Arena
- Date: 14 August 2016
- Competitors: 12 from 8 nations
- Winning score: 15.633

Medalists
| 1st place, gold medalist(s) | | Max Whitlock | Great Britain |
| 2nd place, silver medalist(s) | | Diego Hypólito | Brazil |
| 3rd place, bronze medalist(s) | | Arthur Mariano | Brazil |

The Men's floor competition at the 2016 Summer Olympics was held at the HSBC Arena on 14 August.

The medals were presented by Sir Philip Craven IOC member, Great Britain and Steve Butcher, FIG Men's Artistic Gymnastics Technical Committee President.

== Competition format ==
The top 8 qualifiers in the qualification phase (limit two per NOC), based on combined score of each apparatus, advanced to the individual all-around final. The finalists performed on each apparatus again. Qualification scores were then ignored, with only final round scores counting.

== Qualification ==
The gymnasts who ranked in the top eight qualified for the final round. If there were more than two gymnasts in same NOC, the last ranked among them would not qualify for the final round, and the next best ranked gymnast would qualify instead.

| Rank | Name | Difficulty | Execution | Penalty | Total | Qualification |
|---|---|---|---|---|---|---|
| 1 | Sam Mikulak (USA) | 6.800 | 9.000 | | 15.800 | Q |
| 2 | Jacob Dalton (USA) | 6.700 | 8.900 | | 15.600 | Q |
| 3 | Kōhei Uchimura (JPN) | 6.900 | 8.633 | | 15.533 | Q |
| 4 | Diego Hypólito (BRA) | 6.800 | 8.700 | | 15.500* | Q |
| 4 | Max Whitlock (GBR) | 6.800 | 8.700 | | 15.500* | Q |
| 6 | Kenzō Shirai (JPN) | 7.600 | 7.833 | −0.1 | 15.333 | Q |
| 7 | Kristian Thomas (GBR) | 6.200 | 9.033 | | 15.233* | Q |
| 8 | Yūsuke Tanaka (JPN) | 6.300 | 8.933 | | 15.233* | 2 per NOC** |
| 9 | Arthur Mariano (BRA) | 6.400 | 8.800 | | 15.200* | Q |
| 10 | Manrique Larduet (CUB) | 6.500 | 8.700 | | 15.200* | R1 |
| 11 | Rayderley Zapata (ESP) | 6.700 | 8.383 | | 15.083 | R2 |
| 12 | Benjamin Gischard (SUI) | 6.400 | 8.666 | | 15.066 | R3 |

*When two athletes record the same total score, the one with the higher execution score finishes ahead. If the execution score is the same, then the one with the higher D-score finishes ahead. If the D-score is also the same, then they finish tied.

**Yūsuke Tanaka of Japan was skipped even though he qualified within the top eight because of the strict “two per country” (2 per NOC) rule in individual apparatus finals, and Shirai and Uchimura had already placed ahead of Tanaka.

== Final ==
| Rank | Name | Difficulty | Execution | Penalty | Total |
|---|---|---|---|---|---|
| 1st place, gold medalist(s) | Max Whitlock (GBR) | 6.800 | 8.833 | | 15.633 |
| 2nd place, silver medalist(s) | Diego Hypólito (BRA) | 6.800 | 8.733 | | 15.533 |
| 3rd place, bronze medalist(s) | Arthur Mariano (BRA) | 6.700 | 8.733 | | 15.433 |
| 4 | Kenzō Shirai (JPN) | 7.600 | 7.766 | | 15.366 |
| 5 | Kōhei Uchimura (JPN) | 6.900 | 8.641 | −0.3 | 15.241 |
| 6 | Jacob Dalton (USA) | 6.700 | 8.433 | | 15.133 |
| 7 | Kristian Thomas (GBR) | 6.200 | 8.858 | | 15.058 |
| 8 | Sam Mikulak (USA) | 6.600 | 7.833 | −0.1 | 14.333 |

== Crowd Controversy ==
Kenzō Shirai of Japan, the two-time and reigning world champion on floor, was the overwhelming favorite owing to the extremely high difficulty of his routine and excellent execution, particularly his landings of complex acrobatic elements. But on this occasion Shirai had unusual problems with his landings on three of his six passes. In separate interviews after the competition, both Shirai and American Sam Mikulak, who was the top qualifier but finished in last place, expressed disappointment with the crowd, whose booing and jeering had grown increasingly loud during non-Brazilian routines as the competition went on - two Brazilian gymnasts having taken unexpected podium positions during competition.

Whitlock, the reigning world silver medalist, had avoided this due to his early draw in the final performance and posted a less complex but notably clean routine to become the first individual Olympic champion in gymnastics for Great Britain. Ironically, the British media had reported it to be highly likely that Great Britain would indeed crown its first ever Olympic champion in that session - but forty minutes later, in the pommel horse, widely seen as a direct showdown between 2012 pommel horse medalists Whitlock and compatriot, Louis Smith. In the event, that showdown indeed occurred, with Whitlock winning his second gold in forty minutes ahead of Smith in silver.
