= Scott Hann =

English gymnastics coach

- Born: 26 June 1980 (age 45); Essex, England
- Education: Burnt Mill School (1991–96)
- Alma mater: Harlow College
- Occupation: Gymnastics coach
- Employer: South Essex Gymnastics Club
- Known for: Personal coach to Max Whitlock, Brinn Bevan, Gaius "Jay" Thompson and Reiss Beckford

Scott Denny Hann, MBE (born 26 June 1980) is an English gymnastics coach, currently serving as the Director of Coaching for the South Essex Gymnastics Club in Basildon, Essex. Most notably, he has coached 2012 Olympian, 2016 double Olympic Champion, and World Champion Max Whitlock (his brother-in-law), and World Medalist and Olympic team member Brinn Bevan, Jamaican team member Reiss Beckford and 2016 Olympic Bronze medallist Amy Tinkler.

Hann was appointed Member of the Order of the British Empire (MBE) in the 2017 Birthday Honours for services to gymnastics.

== Personal life ==
Once a gymnast coached by Vic Kevlishvili, who now is the owner and head coach at Phoenix Gymnastics Centre. He attended Burnt Mill Academy (then Burnt Mill School) from 1991 to 1996, then moving onto Harlow College. He lives in Basildon, Essex with his wife Jamie-leigh (married on 9 July 2010) and two children.
