= Sanne Wevers =

Dutch artistic gymnast (born 1991)

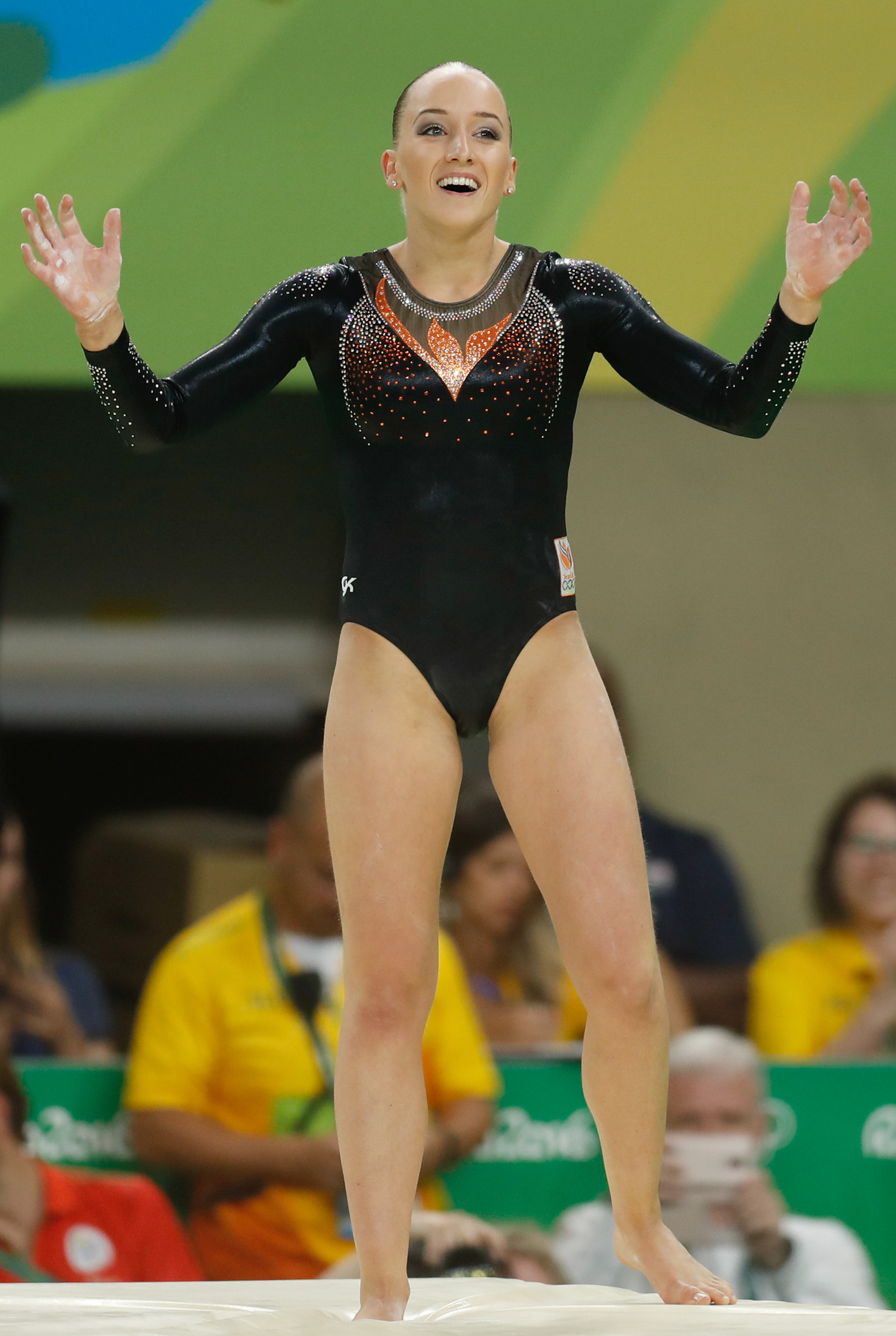
- Wevers at the 2016 Summer Olympics

Personal information
- Born: 17 September 1991 (age 35) Leeuwarden, Friesland, Netherlands
- Height: 1.56 m (5 ft 1 in)
- Relatives: Lieke Wevers

Gymnastics career
- Discipline: Women's artistic gymnastics
- Country represented: Netherlands; (2007–2026)
- Club: Topsport Noord Heerenveen
- Head coach: Vincent Wevers
- Eponymous skills: Wevers (E): 2/1 turn (720) with heel of free leg forward at horizontal throughout turn (Balance beam)
- Retired: October 19, 2026
Medal record
Representing the Netherlands
Olympic Games
Gold medal – first place	2016 Rio de Janeiro	Balance beam
World Championships
Silver medal – second place	2015 Glasgow	Balance beam
European Championships
Gold medal – first place	2018 Glasgow	Balance beam
Gold medal – first place	2023 Antalya	Balance beam
Silver medal – second place	2021 Basel	Balance beam
Bronze medal – third place	2015 Montpellier	Uneven bars
Bronze medal – third place	2018 Glasgow	Team
Bronze medal – third place	2023 Antalya	Team
FIG World Cup
Event	1st	2nd	3rd
Apparatus World Cup	4	2	0
World Challenge Cup	1	1	1
Total	5	3	1

Sanne Wevers (born 17 September 1991) is a Dutch artistic gymnast. She is the 2016 Olympic champion on the balance beam and was the first Dutch female gymnast to become an Olympic champion in an individual event. She is the 2018 and 2023 European champion on the balance beam. She is also the 2015 World and 2021 European silver medalist on the balance beam and the 2015 European bronze medalist on the uneven bars. She was a member of the Dutch team that won the bronze medal at the 2018 and 2023 European Championships.

Wevers, primarily an uneven bars and balance beam specialist, has competed internationally for the Netherlands since 2004. She won several medals on the FIG World Cup circuit in 2008 and 2009 before being sidelined with several injuries. Her first major breakthrough came at the 2015 European Championships where she qualified for two event finals and won the uneven bars bronze medal. She followed this up with a balance beam silver medal at the 2015 World Championships and then the gold medal at the 2016 Olympic Games. She is known for building up her balance beam difficulty through dance elements and connections rather than acrobatic skills.

== Early life ==
Wevers was born on 17 September 1991 in Leeuwarden. She is six minutes older than her fraternal twin, Lieke. They were both members of the Dutch national gymnastics team and are coached by their father Vincent Wevers in Heerenveen.

== Career ==
Wevers competed in her first major international competition at the 2004 Junior European Championships in Amsterdam where the Dutch team finished sixth.

=== 2007 ===
Wevers became age-eligible for senior international competitions in 2007. At the Ghent World Cup, she placed seventh on uneven bars. Then at the Glasgow Grand Prix she placed eighth on balance beam. At the European Championships in Amsterdam, she competed on the uneven bars, balance beam, and floor exercise but did not qualify for any event finals. She was then selected to compete at the World Championships in Stuttgart and competed only on the balance beam. She scored 13.800 and contributed to the Dutch team's seventeenth-place finish in the qualification round.

=== 2008 ===
Wevers began the 2008 Olympic season at the European Championships in Clermont-Ferrand. She scored 14.975 on the balance beam, contributing to the Netherlands' eighth-place finish in the team finals. She then finished eighth on beam at the Cottbus World Cup, and won silver on beam at the Maribor World Cup. At the World Cup in Tianjin, she finished seventh on balance beam.

At the Dutch Championships, Wevers finished second in the all-around, balance beam, and floor exercise and fifth on the uneven bars. The Netherlands could only send one athlete to the 2008 Summer Olympics, and Suzanne Harmes was chosen instead of Wevers.

Wevers won her first FIG World Cup gold medal at the Glasgow World Cup by winning the gold on both the uneven bars and the balance beam. Then at the Stuttgart DTB Cup, she placed sixth on the uneven bars and fourth on the balance beam. She qualified for the World Cup Final on the balance beam. However, she tore a muscle in her right elbow two days before the competition and withdrew.

=== 2009–2012 ===
Wevers tied for the balance beam gold medal at the 2009 Glasgow World Cup with Spanish gymnast Ana María Izurieta. She then won the gold medal on the balance beam with a score of 14.175 at the 2009 Moscow World Cup. At the Dutch Championships, she won the all-around bronze medal and the balance beam gold medal. She then competed at the 2009 World Championships in London but injured her ankle on the floor exercise. She still competed on the balance beam after the injury but did not qualify for the event final.

In 2010, Wevers competed at the European Championships and contributed a 13.025 on the balance beam toward the Netherlands' seventh-place finish. She was selected to compete at the 2010 World Championships, where the Netherlands finished ninth in qualifications, one spot away from the team final. On the balance beam, Wevers successfully performed a new element, a double full turn with free leg at horizontal, and the skill was named after her in the Code of Points. She had shoulder surgery after the World Championships.

Wevers was unable to compete at the 2011 World Championships and the 2012 Olympic Test Event due to an ankle injury. She returned to competition at the 2012 Ostrava World Cup in November, where she won the silver medal on the balance beam behind Czech gymnast Kristýna Pálešová.

=== 2013–2014 ===
Wevers began the 2013 season at the Dutch Invitational where she finished fourth on the uneven bars and won the bronze medal on the balance beam behind Diana Bulimar and Becky Downie. She then won the gold medal on the balance beam at the Osijek World Cup. She fell off the balance beam at the World Championships in Antwerp and did not qualify for the event final.

Wevers competed at the 2014 European Championships in Sofia, where the Dutch team finished ninth in the qualification round, making them the first reserve for the team final. These European Championships marked the first time both of the Wevers twins competed together at a major international competition. Then in June, she competed at the Dutch Championships, winning gold on beam and silver on bars and placing ninth in the all-around. At the 2014 World Championships, she helped the Netherlands finished tenth in the qualification round.

=== 2015 ===
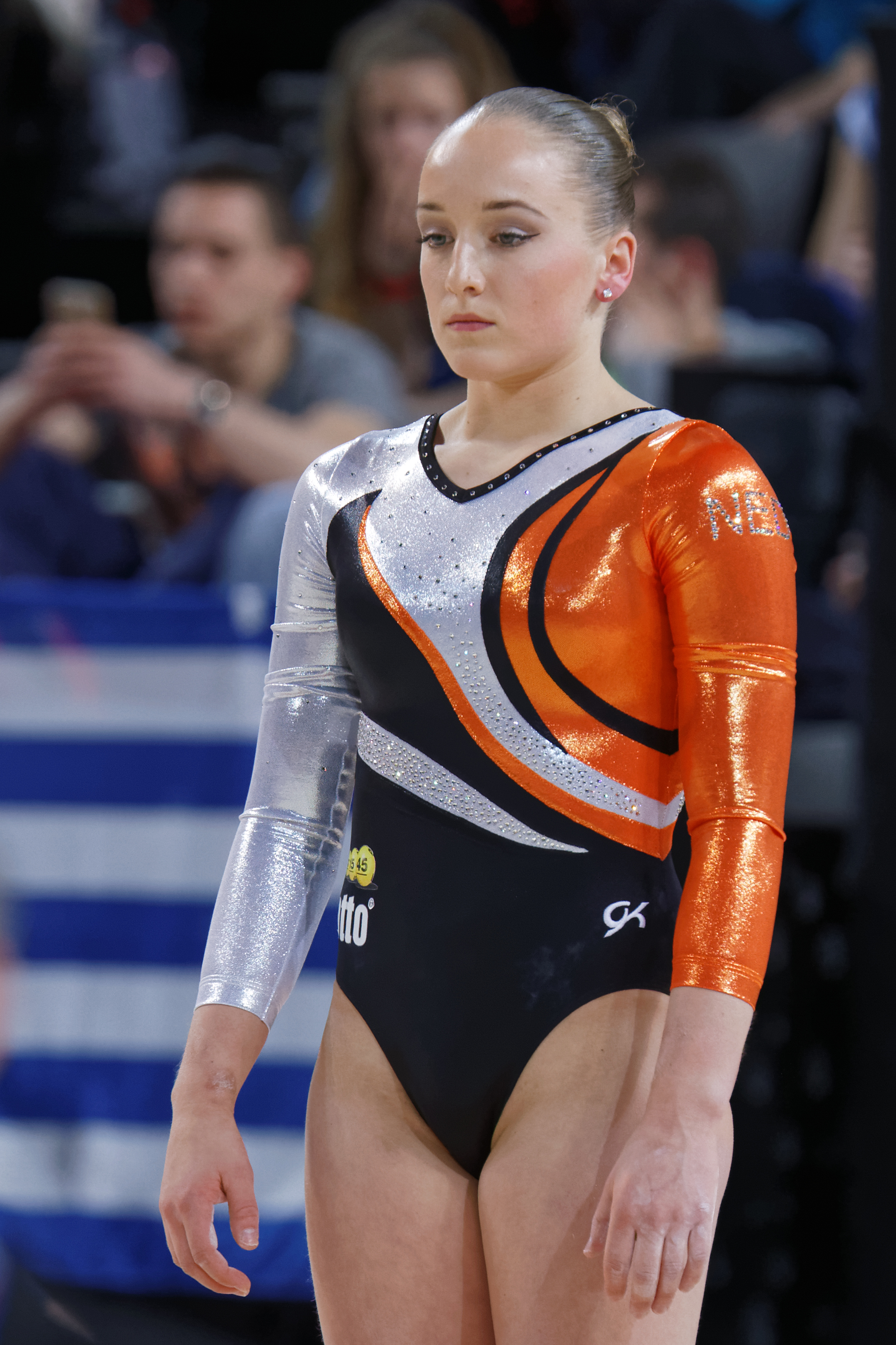
Wevers at the 2015 European Championships

Wevers began the 2015 season at the Ljubljana World Cup in April and finished fourth in the balance beam final with a fall. She was selected to represent the Netherlands at the individual European Championships in Montpellier, France. She competed on the uneven bars and the balance beam and qualified for both event finals in fourth and fifth place, respectively. In the uneven bars final, she scored 14.200 and won her first European medal, a bronze behind Russia's Daria Spiridonova and Great Britain's Becky Downie. She finished eighth in the balance beam final with a score of 11.900.

Wevers was selected to compete at the World Championships in Glasgow alongside her sister Lieke, Eythora Thorsdottir, Tisha Volleman, Vera van Pol, and Lisa Top. In the qualification round, the team beat out Brazil by less than half of a point for the eighth and final Olympic qualification spot. This marked the first time the Netherlands qualified as a team for the Olympic Games since 1976. The team once again finished eighth in the team final. Individually, Wevers qualified for the balance beam final in second place, two tenths of a point behind Simone Biles. After her routine in the event finals, she immediately calculated her own difficulty score in a notebook. She calculated that her difficulty score should have been one-tenth higher than what the judges initially scored her, and she successfully appealed. The final score was 14.333, and she won the silver medal behind Biles by a margin of 1.025. This marked the first time a Dutch woman won a medal at the World Artistic Gymnastics Championships in ten years. This was also the first time a Dutch gymnast had ever won a World medal on the balance beam.

=== 2016 ===
At the Cottbus World Challenge Cup, Wevers fell off the balance beam but still captured the bronze medal behind Katarzyna Jurkowska-Kowalska and Sophie Scheder. She then competed at the Olympic Test Event in Rio de Janeiro and won the gold medal on the balance beam. At the IAG SportEvent, a domestic competition, she only competed on the balance beam and won the gold medal with a score of 15.500. Then in June, she won the gold medal on the balance beam at the Dutch Championships with a score of 15.650. On 9 July, she won another balance beam gold medal at the Dutch Olympic Qualifier with a score of 15.400.

Wevers was named to represent the Netherlands at the 2016 Summer Olympics alongside Lieke Wevers, Eythora Thorsdottir, Céline van Gerner, and Vera van Pol, and her father Vincent Wevers was also selected to travel to Rio de Janeiro as a coach. In the qualification round on 7 August, Wevers scored 14.408 on uneven bars and 15.066 on balance beam, advancing to the balance beam final in fourth place. The Dutch team then competed in the team final on 9 August, and Wevers contributed scores of 14.533 on the uneven bars and 15.250 on the balance beam towards the team's seventh-place finish. On 15 August, she won the gold medal in the balance beam final with a score of 15.466 ahead of Americans Laurie Hernandez and Simone Biles. Compared to other top competitors, Wevers' beam routine emphasized turns over acrobatic skills. This was the first time a Dutch woman won an individual medal in gymnastics, the second time a Dutch woman won a medal in gymnastics after the Dutch team won gold at their home Olympics in 1928, and the second time a Dutch gymnast won an individual medal, following Epke Zonderland's win on the horizontal bar at the 2012 Summer Olympics. She also became the oldest female Olympic gymnastics champion since 1968. She was selected to be the Netherlands's flag bearer at the closing ceremony.

=== 2017 ===
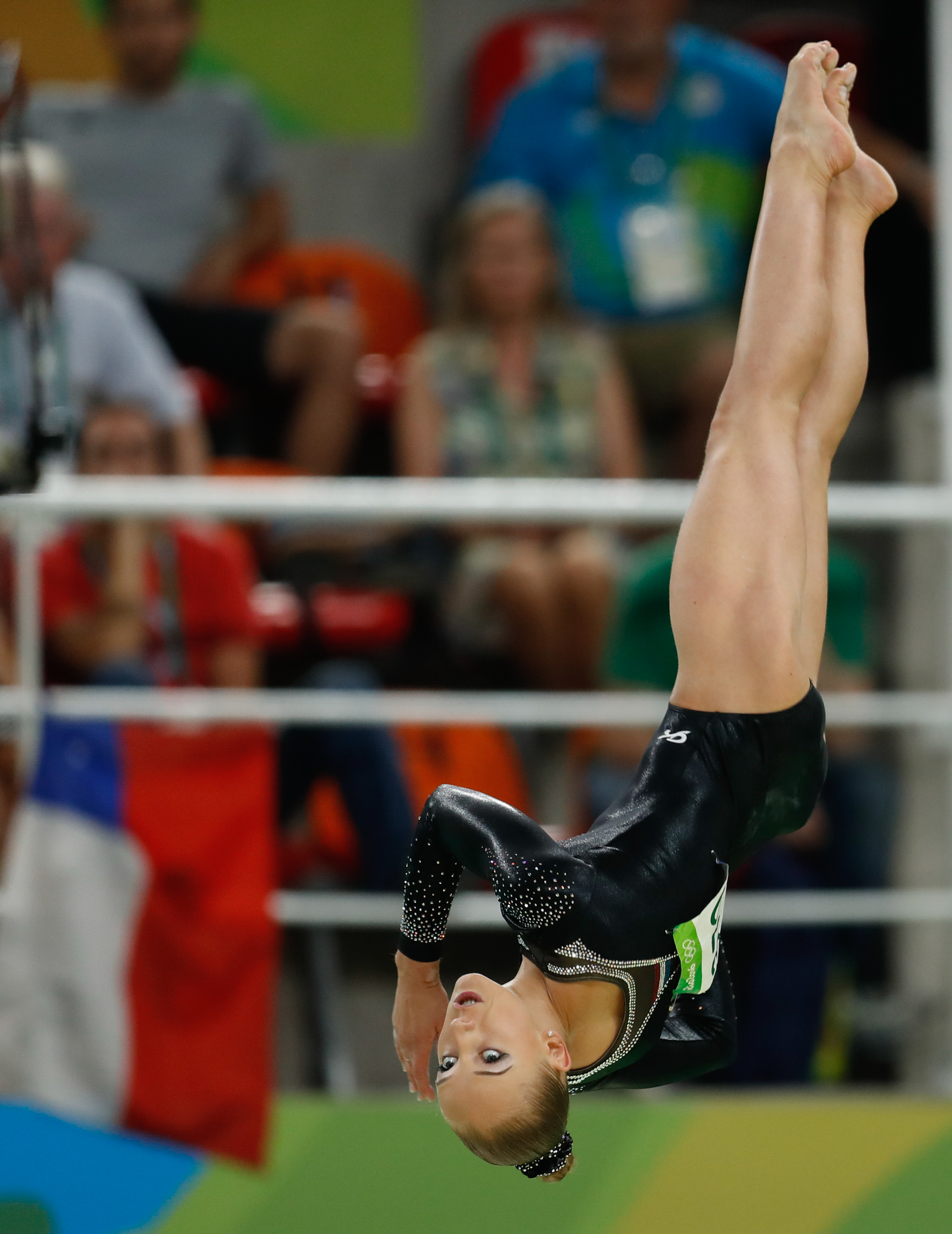
Wevers at the 2016 Olympic Games

After the Olympic Games, Wevers returned to competition in February at the Melbourne World Cup with a new balance beam routine due to changes in the Code of Points. She won the silver medal behind Liu Tingting from China with a score of 14.500. She was chosen to represent the Netherlands at the European Championships in Cluj-Napoca alongside Eythora Thorsdottir, Tisha Volleman, and Kirsten Polderman. Wevers qualified for the balance beam final and finished in fifth place with a score of 13.341. In September, she competed at the Dutch Invitational and finished sixth in the balance beam final. Then at the Paris Challenge Cup, she finished fifth in the balance beam final.

Wevers competed at the World Championships and did not qualify for the balance beam final due to missing a required backward acrobatic element in her routine, an automatic 0.5 point deduction from her difficulty score. After the World Championships, she competed at the Cottbus World Challenge Cup and finished fourth on the uneven bars and fifth on the balance beam after falling on her dismount. Then at the Toyota International, she won a gold medal on the balance beam with a score of 14.100, and she also finished fifth on the uneven bars.

=== 2018 ===
At the Dutch Championships, Wevers won the gold medal on the balance beam and placed fifth on the uneven bars. She won another balance beam gold medal at the Heerenveen Friendly as well as a team silver medal. She was selected to compete at the European Championships in Glasgow alongside Tisha Volleman, Vera van Pol, Naomi Visser, and Céline van Gerner. Wevers competed on uneven bars and balance beam in the qualification, helping the Dutch team qualify for the team final in fifth place and qualified for the balance beam final in fourth place. In the team finals, she scored 13.733 on the uneven bars and 13.700 on the balance beam to help the Dutch team win the bronze medal behind Russia and France. This was the first time the Netherlands won a team medal at the European Women's Artistic Gymnastics Championships since 2002. Then in the balance beam final she won her first European title with a score of 13.900.

Wevers was named to the team to compete at the World Championships in Doha, Qatar alongside Vera van Pol, Kirsten Polderman, Naomi Visser, and Tisha Volleman. The team placed tenth in the qualification round and was the second reserve for the team final. She qualified for the balance beam final, but she fell off the beam on her acrobatic series and finished seventh.

=== 2019 ===
In February, Wevers announced that she would spend the majority of the year recovering from leg and hip injuries and would miss the European Championships in Szczecin. She made her return to competition at the 2nd Heerenveen Friendly in September where she helped the Dutch team place first. She then competed at the World Championships in Stuttgart alongside Eythora Thorsdottir, Lieke Wevers, Tisha Volleman, and Naomi Visser. The team finished sixth during the qualification round and qualified a team spot for the 2020 Olympic Games, and then in the team final, they finished eighth.

=== 2020–2022 ===
Wevers did not compete in 2020 due to the COVID-19 pandemic. She returned to competition in April 2021 at the Heerenveen Friendly and won a silver medal on the balance beam behind Lieke Wevers. She then competed at the 2021 European Championships in Basel where she qualified for the balance beam final in second place behind Larisa Iordache. Then in the final, she performed a clean routine and won the silver medal behind Mélanie de Jesus dos Santos.

On 27 June 2021, Wevers was selected to represent the Netherlands at the 2020 Summer Olympics alongside Eythora Thorsdottir, Vera van Pol, and Lieke Wevers. In the qualification round, the team finished eleventh and did not qualify for the team final. Individually, Wevers scored 13.866 on the balance beam and was the third reserve for the balance beam final.

In 2022, Wevers left the Dutch national team due to an ongoing dispute with teammate Vera van Pol.

=== 2023 ===
Wevers returned to the national team and competed at the 2023 European Championships where she helped the Netherlands win team bronze. Individually Wevers won gold on balance beam. At the 2023 World Championships she helped the Netherlands finish seventh as a team, which earned them a team qualification for the Olympics in Paris. Individually Wevers was initially the first reserve for the balance beam final but was substituted in when Jessica Gadirova withdrew due to injury. She ultimately finished fourth.

=== 2024 ===
Wevers competed at the Antalya World Challenge Cup in March where she finished fourth on the balance beam. In July Wevers was selected to represent the Netherlands at the 2024 Summer Olympics for the third time alongside her twin sister Lieke, Vera van Pol, Naomi Visser, and Sanna Veerman. After the qualifications round, Wevers was the first reserve for the balance beam final.

=== 2026 ===
After not competing in 2025, Wevers returned to competition at the 2026 Dutch Championships, winning gold on balance beam. In August, she was part of the Dutch team that placed sixth at the European Championships.

On October 6, Wevers was named to the team for the 2026 World Championships, being held in her home country, with Naomi Visser, Vera van Pol, Vera Ubbink, and Sanna Veerman. Wevers announced her retirement after podium training at the World Championships.

== Eponymous skill ==
Wevers has one eponymous skill listed in the Code of Points- a double L turn on the balance beam.

Apparatus	Name	Description	Difficulty (Note: Valid for the 2025–2028 Code of Points)	Added to the Code of Points
Balance beam	Wevers	2/1 turn (720) with heel of free leg forward at horizontal throughout turn	E (0.5)	2010 World Championships

== Competitive history ==
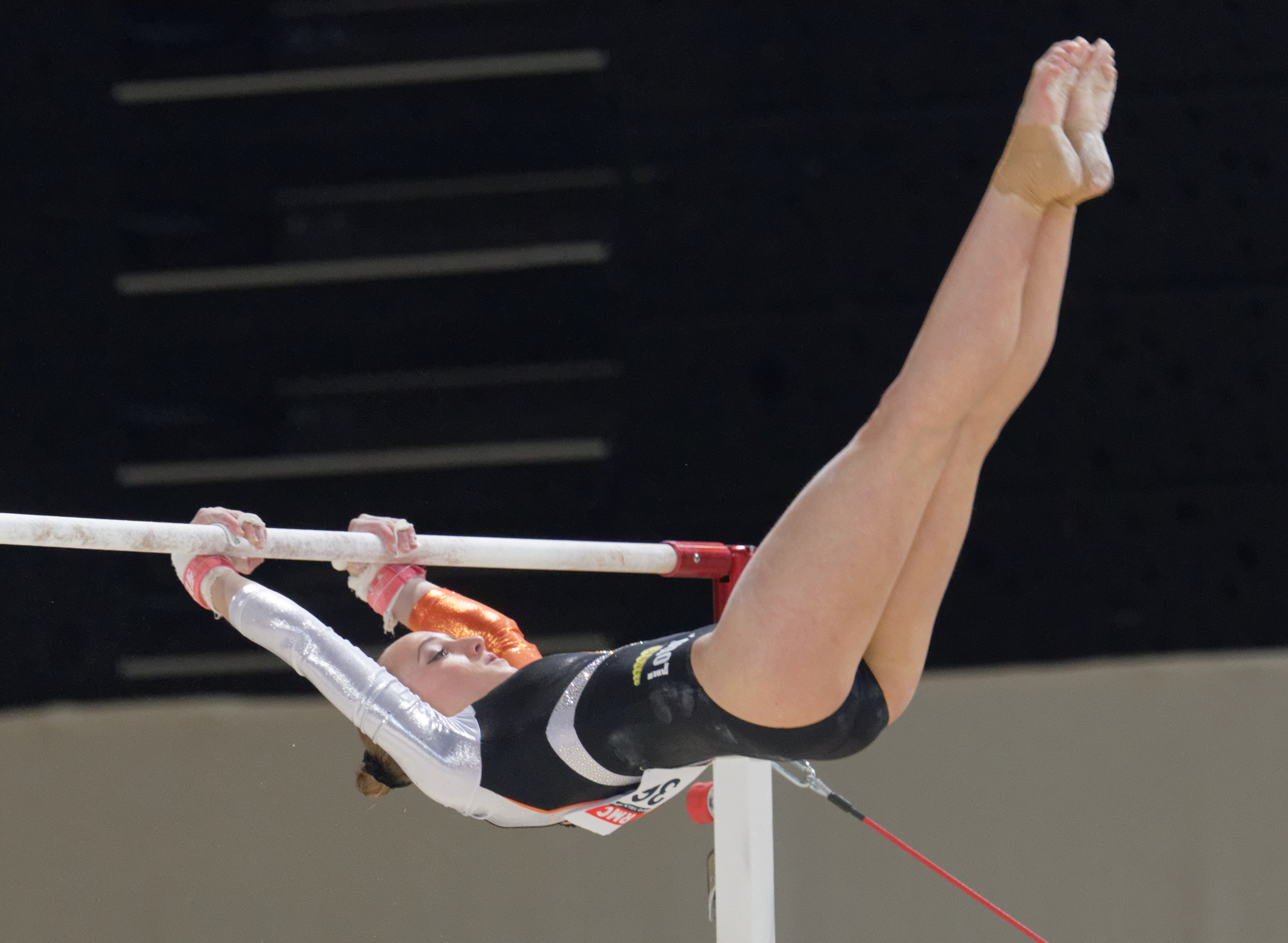
Wevers on uneven bars at the 2015 European Championships

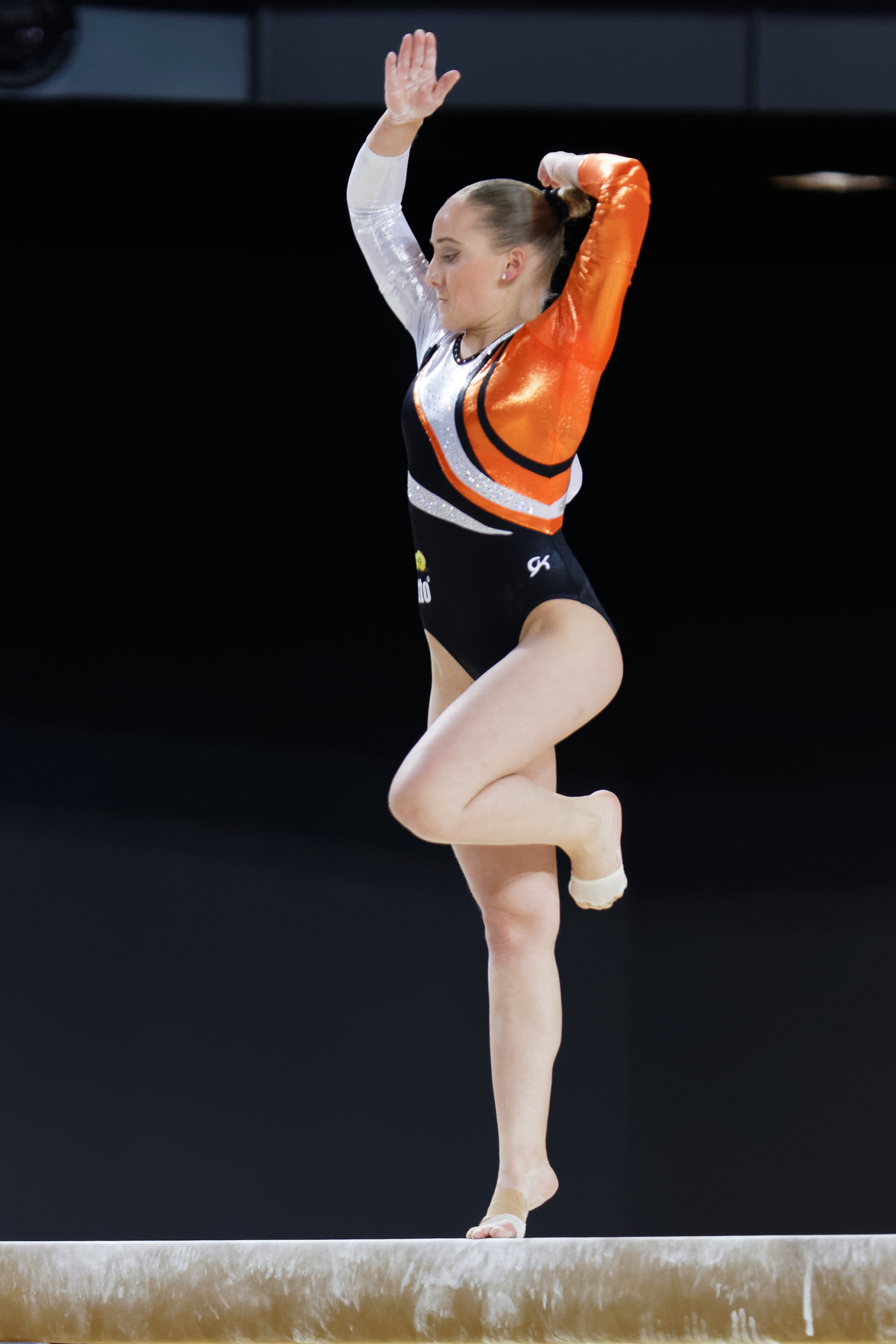
Wevers on balance beam at the 2015 European Championships

Competitive history of Sanne Wevers
Year	Event	Team	AA	VT	UB	BB	FX
2004
2004	Junior European Championships	6					
2007	Ghent World Cup				7		
2007	Glasgow Grand Prix					8	
2007	World Championships	17					
2008
2008	European Championships	8					
2008	Cottbus World Cup					8	
2008	Maribor World Cup					2nd place, silver medalist(s)	
2008	Tianjin World Cup					7	
2008	Dutch Championships		2nd place, silver medalist(s)		5	2nd place, silver medalist(s)	2nd place, silver medalist(s)
2008	Glasgow World Cup				1st place, gold medalist(s)	1st place, gold medalist(s)	7
2008	Stuttgart World Cup				6	4	
2009	Glasgow World Cup					1st place, gold medalist(s)	
2009	Moscow World Cup				4	1st place, gold medalist(s)	
2009	Dutch Championships		3rd place, bronze medalist(s)			1st place, gold medalist(s)	
2010
2010	European Championships	7					
2010	World Championships	9					
2012	Ostrava World Challenge Cup					2nd place, silver medalist(s)	
2013	Dutch Invitational				4	3rd place, bronze medalist(s)	
2013	Osijek World Challenge Cup					1st place, gold medalist(s)	
2014
2014	European Championships	R1					
2014	Dutch Championships		9		2nd place, silver medalist(s)	1st place, gold medalist(s)	
2014	World Championships	10					
2015	Ljubljana World Challenge Cup					4	
2015	European Championships				3rd place, bronze medalist(s)	8	
2015	World Championships	8				2nd place, silver medalist(s)	
2016	Cottbus World Challenge Cup				8	3rd place, bronze medalist(s)	
2016	Olympic Test Event					1st place, gold medalist(s)	
2016	IAG SportEvent					1st place, gold medalist(s)	
2016	Dutch Championships					1st place, gold medalist(s)	
2016	Dutch Olympic Qualifier				17	1st place, gold medalist(s)	
2016	Olympic Games	7				1st place, gold medalist(s)	
2017	Melbourne World Cup					2nd place, silver medalist(s)	
2017	European Championships					5	
2017	Dutch Invitational					6	
2017	Paris World Challenge Cup					5	
2017	Cottbus World Challenge Cup				4	5	
2017	Toyota International				5	1st place, gold medalist(s)	
2018	Dutch Championships				5	1st place, gold medalist(s)	
2018	Heerenveen Friendly	2nd place, silver medalist(s)			4	1st place, gold medalist(s)	
2018	European Championships	3rd place, bronze medalist(s)				1st place, gold medalist(s)	
2018	World Championships	R2				7	
2019	2nd Heerenveen Friendly	1st place, gold medalist(s)					
2019	World Championships	8					
2021	Heerenveen Friendly					2nd place, silver medalist(s)	
2021	European Championships					2nd place, silver medalist(s)	
2021	Olympic Games	11				R3	
2023
2023	European Championships	3rd place, bronze medalist(s)				1st place, gold medalist(s)	
2023	World Championships	7				4	
2024	Antalya World Challenge Cup					4	
2024	Olympic Games	9				R1	
2026
2026	European Championships	6					
2026	World Championships	11					

== Awards ==
- Dutch Sportswoman of the Year (2016)

Awards
Preceded by Dafne Schippers	Dutch Sportswoman of the Year; 2016	Succeeded by Dafne Schippers
