= Adela Šajn =

Slovenian artistic gymnast (born 1990)

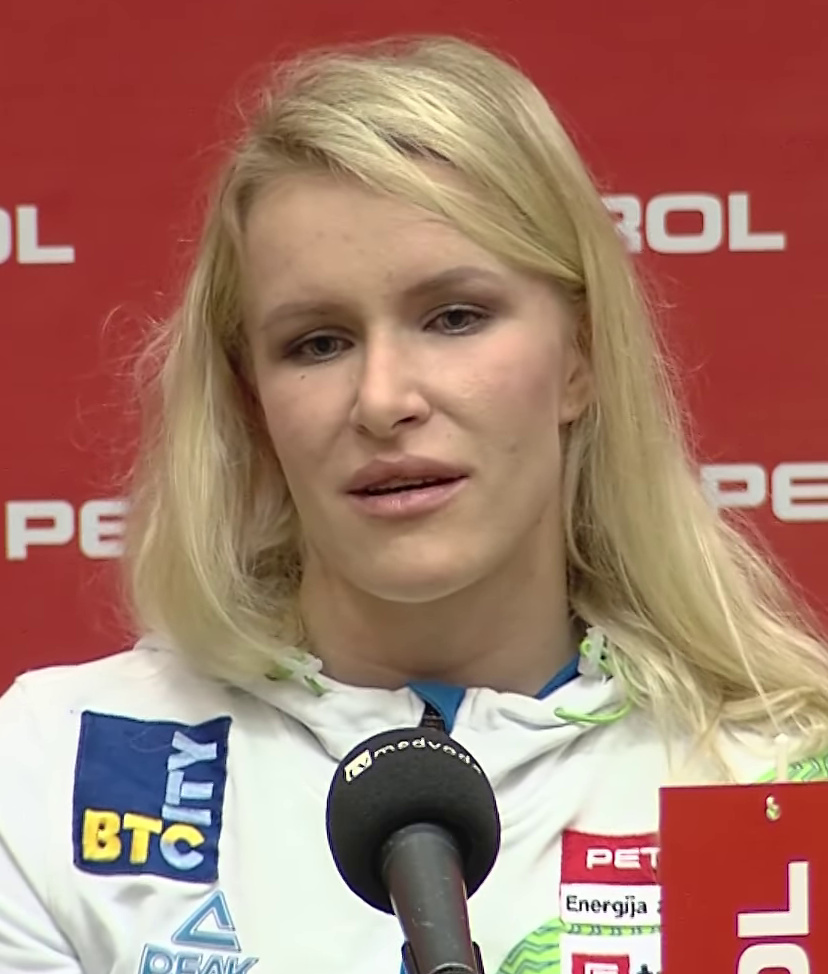
- Šajn in 2019

Personal information
- Born: 14 April 1990 (age 36) Ljubljana, Slovenia
- Height: 167 cm (5 ft 6 in)

Gymnastics career
- Discipline: Women's artistic gymnastics
- Country represented: Slovenia
- Club: GD Zelena Jama
Medal record
Women's artistic gymnastics
Representing Slovenia
FIG World Cup
Event	1st	2nd	3rd
Apparatus World Cup	0	4	2
World Challenge Cup	0	2	1
Total	0	6	3

Adela Šajn (born 14 April 1990) is a Slovenian former artistic gymnast. She participated in the 2008 Summer Olympics in Beijing, China. She also won multiple medals on the FIG World Cup series.

== Gymnastics career ==
At the 2006 Maribor World Cup, Šajn won silver medals on both the balance beam and the floor exercise. She competed on the balance beam and the floor exercise at the 2006 World Championships and did not advance to either final. Then at the 2007 World Championships, she finished 86th in the all-around during the qualification round.

Šajn represented Slovenia at the 2008 Summer Olympics. She only competed on the balance beam, where she fell, and the floor exercise and did not advance to either final. At the 2009 Cottbus World Cup, she won a bronze medal on the floor exercise behind Sui Lu and Kim Bui. Then at the Moscow World Cup, she won silver medals on the balance beam and floor exercise. She won another floor exercise bronze medal at the Doha World Cup.

At the 2011 Maribor World Challenge Cup, Šajn won silver medals on both the floor exercise and the balance beam. She qualified for the all-around final at the 2011 Summer Universiade and finished 17th. Then at the 2011 World Championships, she finished 100th in the all-around during the qualification round.

Šajn competed at the 2012 Olympic Test Event but finished behind teammate Saša Golob, meaning she did not earn an Olympic berth.

Šajn won a silver medal on the balance beam at the 2016 Ljubljana World Challenge Cup. She qualified for the balance beam final at the 2017 Summer Universiade and finished sixth. She represented Slovenia at the 2018 Mediterranean Games and helped the team finish sixth. She also competed with the Slovenian team that finished 17th at the 2018 European Championships.

At the 2019 Koper World Challenge Cup, Šajn won a bronze medal on the floor exercise. She finished fifth in the floor exercise final at the 2019 European Games.
