= Burnt Mill Academy =

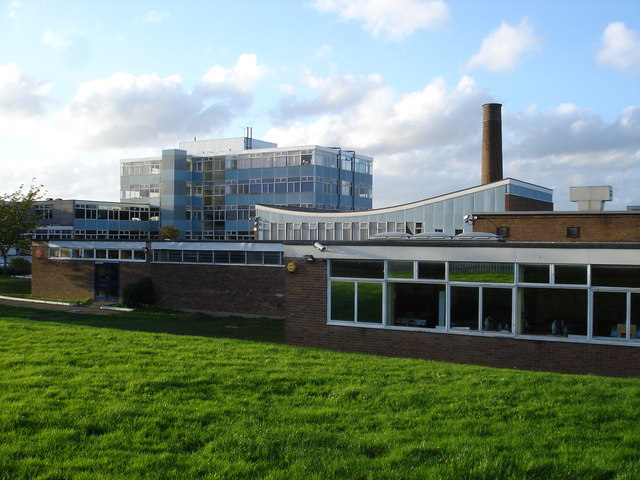

Location
- First Avenue; Harlow, Essex, CM20 2NR; England; 51°46′37″N 0°06′29″E

Information
- Type: Academy
- Established: May 1962; 64 years ago
- Local authority: Essex County Council
- Specialist: Arts (performing arts)
- Department for Education URN: 137694 Tables
- Ofsted: Reports
- Executive headteacher (de facto): Helena Mills (CEO of BMAT)
- Headteacher: Laura McGlashan
- Gender: Coeducational
- Age: 11 to 16
- Enrolment: 1144 as of January 2022
- Capacity: 1200
- Houses: Moore; Eliot; Sheppard; Hunt; Cheshire; Cockcroft
- Colours: Maroon and white
- Publication: The Burnt Mill (discontinued); Burnt Mill News (since 2005)
- Website: www.burntmillacademy.org

Burnt Mill Academy (formerly known de facto as Burnt Mill School) is a secondary school academy and specialist performing arts college situated on First Avenue in Harlow, Essex, England. The school originally opened in May 1962 as Burnt Mill Comprehensive School, de jure keeping this name until academisation in 2011. In 2003, it became a specialist performing arts college, specialising in dance, drama and music. It joined the Confucius institute programme in 2007, partnering with Suzhou Lida Middle School in Jiangsu, China. This granted the school an International School Award. It gained academy status in 2011 and formed the Burnt Mill Academy Trust (BMAT) in 2013. BMAT has since become a multi-academy trust, with 12 member schools as of 2021.

The school is the founding and leading school of the Burnt Mill Academy Trust, with the CEO being Helena Mills, the school's former headteacher. The trust was praised in 2016 by Prime Minister David Cameron as an example of the success of the academies programme, being used for the programme's defence when challenged by opposition leader Jeremy Corbyn during Prime Minister's Questions. The band Swim Deep recorded the music video for their song Grand Affection at the school, which featured the school's GCSE drama students.

== History ==
The construction of Burnt Mill Comprehensive School began in 1958 in order to serve the post-war new town of Harlow. The school opened in May 1962 and was originally housed in the site of nearby Passmores School, moving to its own site in September later that year. Originally the school served 169 children and was headed by Ray Stirling. The motto was Adventure In Faith. In 1963, the school opened an evening institute that provided sixth form education. This would be extended into the day as a normal sixth form in 1966. In 1969, the school experienced multiple expansions concerning its buildings and also provided disability units for pupils suffering from partial hearing loss. In 1974, Headteacher Ray Stirling left the school, being replaced by Ronald Wallis in 1975. In 1985, the school's sixth form was discontinued after the county council forced all schools in Harlow to end sixth form provision. Further education was hereafter provided exclusively by the town's tertiary college. A year later, Headteacher Ronald Wallis retired and was succeeded by Anthony Ward. Burnt Mill Comprehensive School would over the years become widely known as Burnt Mill School. This name was even used by the school itself with "Burnt Mill Comprehensive School" falling into disuse. Despite this, the school's legal name until academisation was always Burnt Mill Comprehensive School.

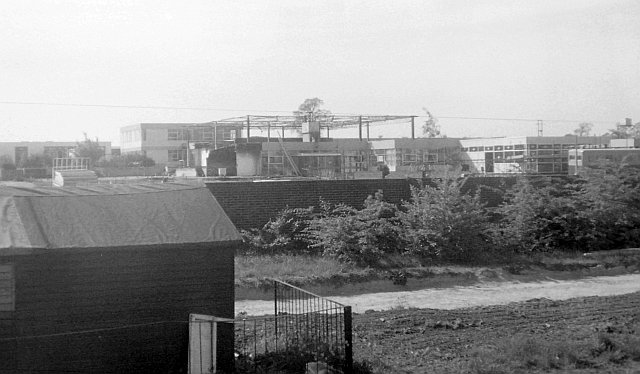
Burnt Mill Comprehensive in 1971

By 2000, the school held community status and had a student body of 970. The headteacher was still Anthony Ward and it was graded as "satisfactory" by Ofsted. The school's partial hearing loss disability units introduced in 1969 were still present and were praised by Ofsted as being "well resourced and effective." Ward left in 2001, being replaced by Silvia Jones. In 2003, the school was designated as a specialist performing arts college under the specialist schools programme. Silvia Jones was succeeded as headteacher in April 2005 by Stephen Chamberlain and in December the school was graded as inadequate by Ofsted. Ofsted mostly criticised the low GCSE results in English, maths and science, stressing that only one in five students achieved a C or above. A C grade in all three subjects was the minimum requirement for employment and entry into college at the time. In 2007, the school recovered and was graded as satisfactory. Later that year, the school would enter the Confucius institute programme, forming a partnership with the Suzhou Lida Middle School in China. The UK government would award Burnt Mill with an International School Award as a result. Headteacher Stephen Chamberlain left Burnt Mill in the summer of 2009, taking up the post of executive principal at the new Clacton Coastal Academy. Two co-acting heads, Ann Davis and Joanna Clark, assumed his post at Burnt Mill.

In September 2009, St Bonaventure's Deputy Head Helena Mills was appointed as Burnt Mill's headteacher designate, entering the post from January 2010. Ofsted would inspect the school again later that year. Although the school was still seen as satisfactory, Ofsted noted that the school was "improving rapidly, already has several good features and has good capacity to improve further." Ofsted accredited this to Helena Mills' new leadership strategy that promoted "equality of opportunity". Under her leadership the school became an academy on 1 December 2011 and became outstanding in 2012 (the highest Ofsted grade). It was graded as outstanding in all four categories. In 2013, the school founded the Burnt Mill Academy Trust (BMAT) with Headteacher Helena Mills becoming CEO. From 2015 the headteacher was John Blaney. Blaney became the school's executive headteacher in 2017, appointing Deputy Head Laura McGlashan as the head of school from September. In 2019, the school's management was restructured. The headteacher role was restored from September, replacing the head of school role, and the executive headteacher position was abolished. The duties of the executive headteacher are now fulfilled by the BMAT CEO, making Helena Mills the de facto executive head. In 2021, the school was selected by the DfE to join the School Rebuilding Programme as part of its second batch of schools. Schools involved in the programme will rebuild and refurbish their buildings over a period of 10 years, sharing a £500 million fund. Work at Burnt Mill is expected to begin in the summer of 2022 and finish by 2024.

== Inspection judgements ==
As of 2023, the school's most recent inspection by Ofsted was in 2023, with an outcome of Good.

== House system ==
Burnt Mill Academy has pastorally managed its students using a house system since its inception in 1962. Currently the school has six houses, each named after an influential individual. They are Moore, Eliot, Sheppard, Hunt, Cheshire and Cockcroft. Students are assigned by the house leaders, who also ensure that students maintain participation in house activities and competition. The main mode of competition for the houses at Burnt Mill is through the house point system. Students earn points for their house by participating in the BM Xtra scheme, a form of extracurricular activity at the school. These points are also earned during competitions and house assemblies. Each house is represented by a colour and shield. They also have their own respective mottos featured on these shields.

== Awards and recognition ==
In April 1964, Burnt Mill was visited by Italian Prime Minister Aldo Moro, resulting in the school being broadcast on regional BBC News channel Town and Around. Two years later the school was visited again, this time by British Secretary of State for Education Quintin Hogg.

Burnt Mill Academy achieved the Platinum Artsmark Award in 2019.

== School site ==
Burnt Mill's site was built between 1958 and 1962. Most of the buildings were handed over to the school in September 1962, which is when it relocated from the site of Passmores School. Some buildings, such as the school's assembly hall and main teaching block were handed over in 1963. At this time there were three house blocks, six common rooms and 21 classrooms. In 1964, the school began a long tradition of installing "stained-glass windows" every Christmas. This tradition was discontinued in 2021 because of Health and Safety violations according to one of the school's teachers.

== Notable former pupils ==
- Michael Arthur, academic
- Lily-Rose Aslandogdu, actress
- Liam Byrne, politician
- Graham Cole, actor
- Scott Hann, Director of Coaching
- Glenn Hoddle, footballer, manager, pundit
- Carl Hoddle, footballer, coach
- Richard Keogh, footballer
- DJ Nihal, BBC radio presenter
- Bill Rammell, politician
- Stephen Sparrow, Phil Titus, of the indie band Morning Parade
- Josh Tedeku, actor
- Jaime Winstone, actor

== Headteachers ==
- Ray Stirling (1962–1974)
- Ronald Wallis (1975–1986)
- Anthony Ward (1986–2001)
- Sylvia Jones (2002–2005)
- Stephen Chamberlain (2005–2009)
- Ann Davis and Joanna Clark (co-ruling and acting 2009–2010)
- Helena Mills (2010–2015, de facto executive 2019–present)
- John Blaney (2015–2017, executive 2017–2019)
- Laura McGlashan (2017–present)
