= Marco Baldauf =

German chess grandmaster (born 1990)

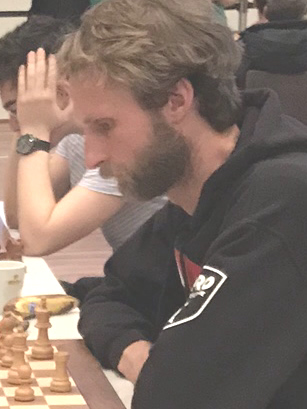
- Baldauf in 2019

Personal information
- Born: June 14, 1990 (age 36) Rosenheim, Germany

Chess career
- Country: Germany
- Title: Grandmaster (2019)
- FIDE rating: 2435 (October 2026)
- Peak rating: 2522 (November 2021)

Marco Baldauf (born June 14, 1990 Rosenheim, Germany) is a German chess grandmaster.

Baldauf has been playing Chess since he was eight years old. He was the German Junior Champion in the year 2000 and 2002. He became FIDE Master(FM) in 2008 and International Master (IM) in 2014. He earned Grandmaster (GM) title in 2019. He plays for SF Berlin in the Bundesliga. He works as a policy advisor in Berlin.

== Notable tournaments ==
Tournament name	Year	ELO	Points
GER-ch U14(Willingen)	2004	2185	6.0
GER-ch U14(Willingen)	2003	2093	7.0
GER-ch U10(Ueberlingen)	2000	NA	9.0
