= Louis Smith (gymnast) =

English artistic gymnast (born 1987)

Louis Smith MBE
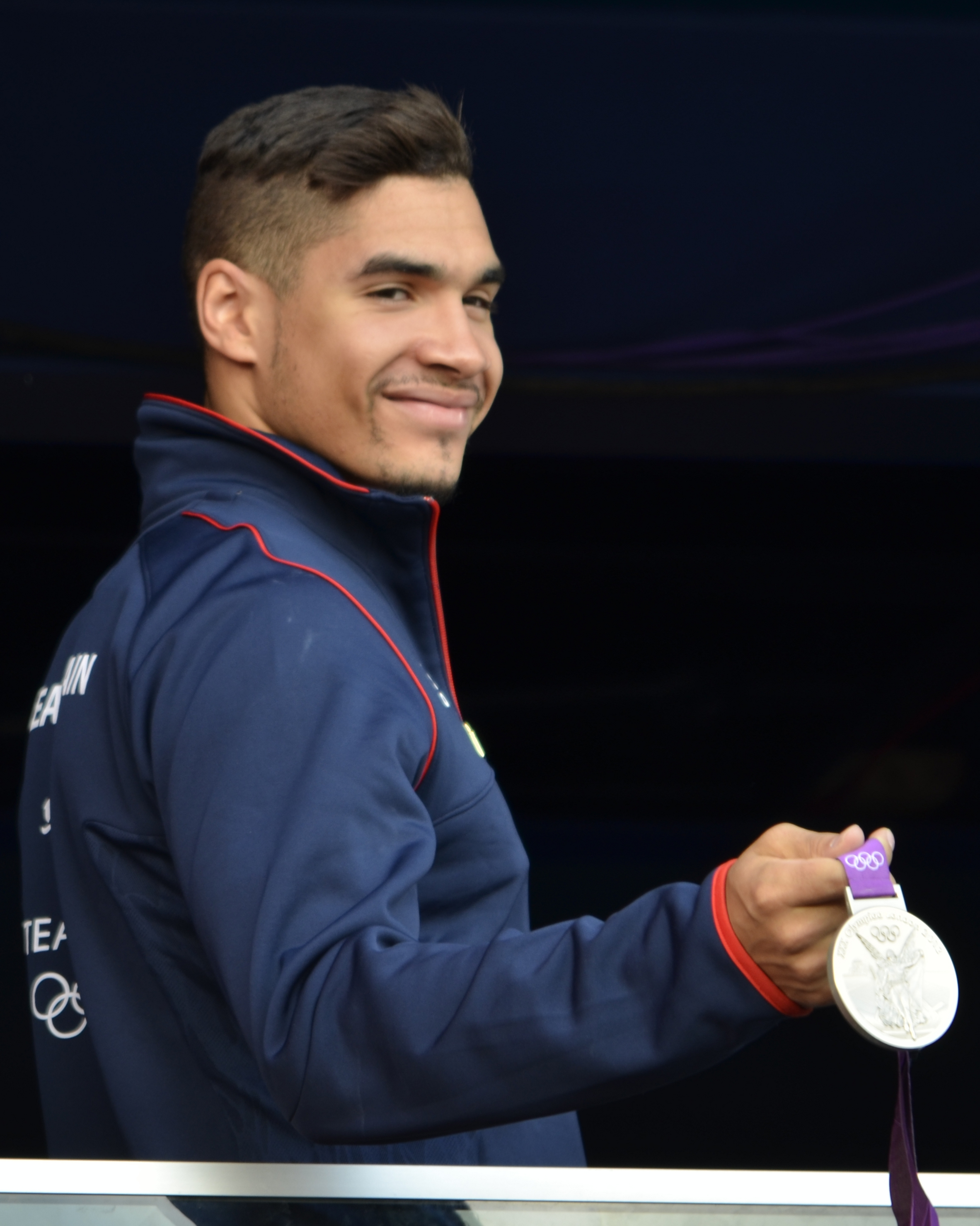
- Smith in 2012

Personal information
- Full name: Louis Antoine Smith
- Nicknames: Lou, Lou-Lou
- Born: 22 April 1989 (age 37) Peterborough, Cambridgeshire, England
- Height: 179 cm (5 ft 10 in)

Gymnastics career
- Discipline: Men's artistic gymnastics
- Country represented: (United Kingdom) Great Britain; England
- Club: Huntingdon Gymnastics Club
- Head coach: Paul Hall
- Retired: 2018
Medal record
Men's artistic gymnastics
Representing Great Britain
Olympic Games
Silver medal – second place	2012 London	Pommel horse
Silver medal – second place	2016 Rio de Janeiro	Pommel horse
Bronze medal – third place	2008 Beijing	Pommel horse
Bronze medal – third place	2012 London	Team
World Championships
Silver medal – second place	2010 Rotterdam	Pommel horse
Silver medal – second place	2015 Glasgow	Team
Silver medal – second place	2015 Glasgow	Pommel horse
Bronze medal – third place	2007 Stuttgart	Pommel horse
Bronze medal – third place	2011 Tokyo	Pommel horse
European Championships
Gold medal – first place	2015 Montpellier	Pommel horse
Gold medal – first place	2012 Montpellier	Team
Silver medal – second place	2009 Milan	Pommel horse
Silver medal – second place	2010 Birmingham	Team
Silver medal – second place	2010 Birmingham	Pommel horse
Silver medal – second place	2012 Montpellier	Pommel horse
Silver medal – second place	2016 Bern	Team
Representing England
Commonwealth Games
Gold medal – first place	2006 Melbourne	Pommel horse
Gold medal – first place	2014 Glasgow	Team
Bronze medal – third place	2006 Melbourne	Team
Bronze medal – third place	2014 Glasgow	Pommel horse

Louis Antoine Smith (born 22 April 1989) is a retired English artistic gymnast.

He received a bronze medal and two silver medals on the pommel horse at the 2008 Beijing Olympics, 2012 London Olympics and the 2016 Rio Olympics respectively, with the former marking the first time a British gymnast had placed in an Olympic event since 1928. He fell just short of gold in 2012, tying with Kristian Berki, but taking silver for a lower E or execution score. He followed this up with a second consecutive silver medal on the pommel horse at the 2016 Rio Olympics, this time finishing behind teammate, and 2012 bronze medalist, Max Whitlock.

Smith was also part of the Great Britain team that took the bronze in the men's artistic team all-around at the 2012 London Olympics. He was the first British gymnast to win Olympic medals in three separate Games, and only the second gymnast after Marius Urzică to win three successive Olympic pommel horse medals. His team-mate Whitlock subsequently won Olympic medals in the 2012, 2016 and 2020 Games, and also won successively bronze, gold and gold in these games on the pommel horse. A 2006 Commonwealth Games champion representing England in the pommel horse, in 2015 he became European champion, his first major international title representing Great Britain. Smith is a member of the Huntingdon Gymnastics Club, training alongside teammate Daniel Keatings under coach Paul Hall. He was a part of the European gold medal-winning Great Britain men's team in 2012, a 2010 Commonwealth Games Champion, and is also a four-time European silver medallist. Away from the gym, Smith's media profile has offered a number of television opportunities in his home country. He also won the tenth series of Strictly Come Dancing in 2012 and the first series of the the The Masked Dancer in 2021.

== Early life and education ==
Smith was born in Peterborough to his English mother, Elaine, who separated from his Jamaican-born father, Claude, when he was three. He was diagnosed with ADHD in 1995 and was on Ritalin from age six until he was eleven.

Smith attended Arthur Mellows Village College in Glinton, Cambridgeshire. He has since described his childhood, saying that "My mum took me to a variety of sports but from a young age it was gymnastics that captured my attention and which I really wanted to progress in. I had to sacrifice a lot of things in my social life, and I also didn't do A-Levels as I wanted to focus on the sport".

== Gymnastics career ==
=== 2004–08: before Beijing ===
As a junior, Smith was twice a European champion on the pommel horse, winning the title in 2004 and 2006. In 2006, he placed fifth in the World Cup final. He won gold on the pommel horse for England at the 2006 Commonwealth Games in Melbourne, Australia, beating Prashanth Sellathurai. In 2007, he came fourth in the pommel horse final at the European Championships. He attended his first World Championships competing for Great Britain at the 2007 World Championships in Stuttgart, Germany. There he won a bronze medal in the pommel horse final. He also won a silver on the pommel horse at the World Cup in Ghent the same year. In 2008, Smith won a silver on the pommel horse at the World Cup in Moscow.

=== 2008 Summer Olympics ===
On 9 August 2008, Smith qualified in fifth place for the Olympic final of the men's pommel horse, and on 17 August he won a bronze medal in the finals, becoming the first British man to win a medal in the individual gymnastics at the Olympic Games since Walter Tysall won a silver medal in 1908 and the first Briton generally to win a medal in gymnastics at the Olympic Games since the women's team won a bronze medal in 1928. He is also the second black male gymnast to win a medal in an Olympic competition. The first was Jair Lynch of the United States in 1996, a silver medalist on the parallel bars.

=== 2009–15 ===
In 2009, Smith won his first silver medal at the European Championships on the pommel horse as a senior. In 2010, Smith helped the British men's team to win silver at the European Championships, and once again took the silver medal on the pommel horse. He went on to the 2010 World Artistic Gymnastics Championships in Rotterdam, where he beat Sellathurai once again to take the silver medal. In 2011, he made the pommel horse finals but did not perform at his best and finished in 6th at the European Championships in Berlin. In October, he was chosen to be on the British team for the 2011 World Artistic Gymnastics Championships in Tokyo. The men's team were expected to qualify through to the team finals easily, but had a poor performance in the preliminary rounds. Smith was only chosen to perform on the pommel horse, where he performed well, qualifying through to the finals, ranking 2nd behind the 2010 World Champion, Krisztián Berki. On 14 October, he performed the most difficult routine out of all the finalists, but fell on his dismount, lowering his execution score. Despite this, he still placed 3rd behind Berki and Cyril Tommasone to win the bronze medal — the only medal won by the British men and women at those championships.

In 2012, Smith won the silver medal in the pommel horse finals in the European Men's Artistic Gymnastics Championships.

Smith was part of the Great Britain team at the London Olympics. The team won a bronze medal at the men's artistic team all-around event on 30 July 2012, marking the first team medal for a British Olympic gymnastics team in 100 years. Smith also won the silver medal in the men's pommel horse final, receiving the same score as Berki; Berki, however, was awarded the gold medal due to having a higher execution score. This was especially crushing to the home nation as this could have been Great Britain's first ever Olympic gold medal in gymnastics but Smith said, "I set out to do the best routine of my life and I achieved it so I have to be satisfied".

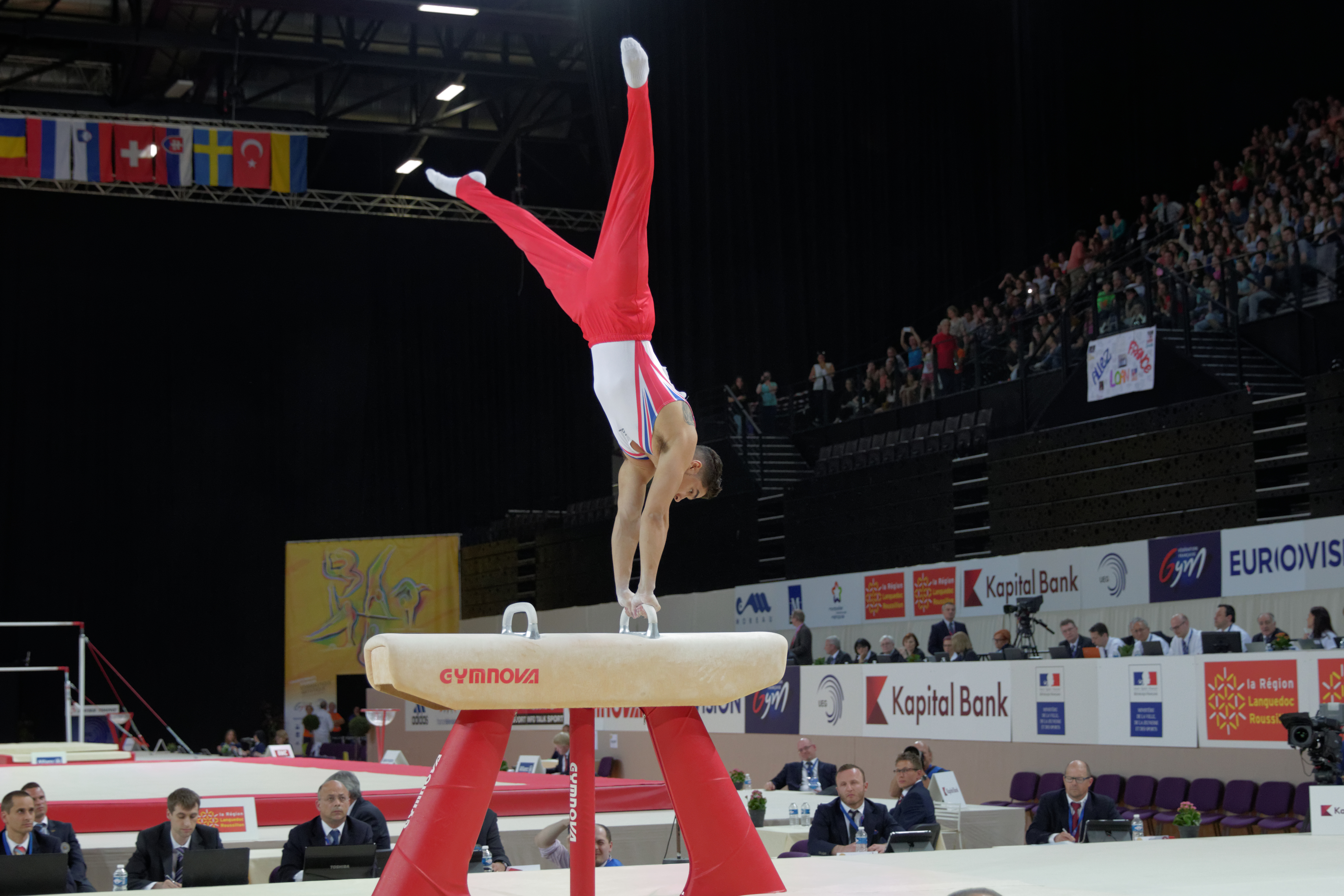
Smith competing on pommel horse at the 2015 European Championships

Smith retired in 2013 and did not compete that year, but announced in early January 2014 that he was back in the gym training in a bid to return to international competition at the 2014 Commonwealth Games in Glasgow. Smith won bronze in the pommel horse finals at the 2014 Commonwealth Games behind his British teammates Daniel Keatings, who was competing for Scotland and Max Whitlock. In 2015, he gained a berth to the British team competing at the 2015 European Artistic Gymnastics Championships in Montpellier, France. On 18 April 2015, he won the gold medal on the pommel horse – his first individual European title – with a score of 15.800.

=== 2016 ===
Smith again represented Great Britain at the 2016 Summer Olympics in Rio de Janeiro. He finished second in the pommel horse final behind teammate Whitlock.

== Other ventures ==
In an attempt to revive his interest in singing, Smith auditioned unsuccessfully for the British television music competition The X Factor in 2008. In 2018, he appeared at the London Palladium in the show Rip it Up the 60s, alongside Harry Judd, Jay McGuiness and Aston Merrygold. In 2019, he starred in the 1970s adaptation of the show. He finished as a runner-up on the 2017 edition of The Jump.

In 2021, Smith appeared on The Masked Dancer, masked as "The Carwash". He was crowned the winner of the series on 5 June 2021.

=== Strictly Come Dancing ===
Smith took part in the 2012 series of the British television show Strictly Come Dancing; his professional partner was Flavia Cacace. From weeks 1–8, his performances received mixed reviews from the judges, until weeks 9–12 when the reviews became more positive and landed him in the top half of the leaderboard. He came top of the leaderboard for the first time in the Halloween week with his tango and then again in week 9 with his Charleston, but his best and perfect score came in the grand final with his Showdance, for which he scored a perfect 40. Smith and Cacace were announced as the winners of the series in the grand final. Smith said "It was brilliant. The training was harder than gymnastics as everything was a new challenge. I never expected to win – I just went out every week with the aim of doing my best." Smith subsequently participated in the 2014 Christmas special with professional, Aliona Vilani. The couple won after dancing a quickstep that scored a perfect 10 from all judges.

Strictly Come Dancing Performances
Week #	Dance/Song	Judges' scores					Result
Week #	Dance/Song	Horwood	Bussell	Goodman	Tonioli	Total	Result
1	Cha-Cha-Cha/"Forget You"	6	8	6	7	27	Safe
2	Viennese Waltz/"Puppy Love"	7	7	8	8	30	Safe
3	Salsa/"(I've Had) The Time of My Life"	8	8	6	8	30	Safe
4	Tango/"Disturbia"	8	9	9	9	35	Safe
5	Samba/"La Bomba"	6	7	8	8	29	Safe
6	Waltz/"Moon River"	6	9	9	9	33	Safe
7	American Smooth/"I Got a Woman"	7	8	8	7	30	Safe
8	Paso Doble/"Dirty Diana"	6	7	7	7	27	Safe
9	Charleston/"Dr. Wanna Do"	8	10	9	10	37	Safe
10	Rumba & Tango/"With or Without You"	9	9	9	10	37	Safe
11	Jive/"Why Do Fools Fall in Love"	7	8	8	8	31	Safe
11	Foxtrot/"Somebody That I Used To Know"	9	10	9	10	38	Safe
12	Salsa/"(I've Had) The Time of My Life"	9	10	10	10	39	Safe
12	Showdance/"Rule the World"	10	10	10	10	40	Safe
12	Charleston/Dr. Wanna Do	9	10	10	10	39	Winner

== Controversy ==
In 2016, Smith issued an apology and visited Fazl Mosque in London, after a video leaked of him mocking the salah.

== Personal life ==
In November 2017, Smith began dating Charlie Bruce, a British jazz dancer from Leicestershire. In September 2020, the couple announced that they were expecting their first child together, with the due date being announced as late February 2021.

Smith was appointed Member of the Order of the British Empire (MBE) in the 2013 New Year Honours for services to gymnastics.
