= Pommel horse =

Apparatus used in artistic gymnastics

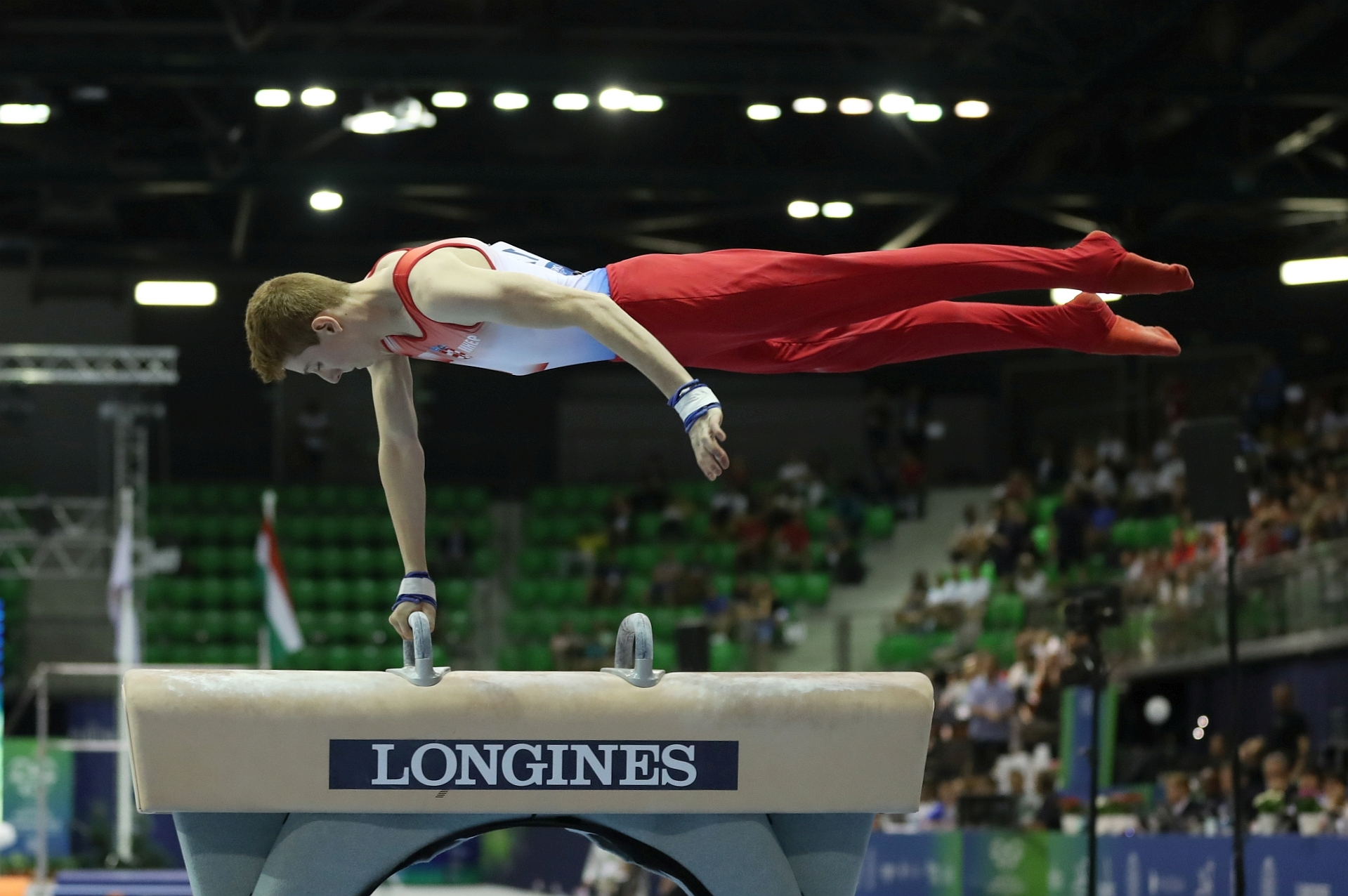
A gymnast on the pommel horse

The pommel horse, also known as vaulting horse, or hobble horse is an artistic gymnastics apparatus. Traditionally, it is used by only male gymnasts. Originally made of a metal frame with a wooden body and a leather cover, the modern pommel horse has a metal body covered with foam rubber and leather, with plastic pommels (handles). A similar apparatus designed for physical education lessons is called a vaulting buck.

== Apparatus ==
=== History ===
The apparatus has been in use as far back as Alexander the Great, where soldiers used wooden horses to teach mounting and dismounting. This practice continued throughout history to the Roman people and into the Middle Ages. Early iterations more closely represented a horse, with some including a head or varied sizing. The horse's saddle was eventually replaced by pommels, originating from the French word "pomel" meaning "knob" or "hilt of a sword".

In modern times, the Prussians, in response to battles against Napoleon, used pommel horses to increase their physical fitness and battly readiness. Later, the basic modern exercises were developed in the early 19th century by Friedrich Ludwig Jahn, founder of the German Turnverein.

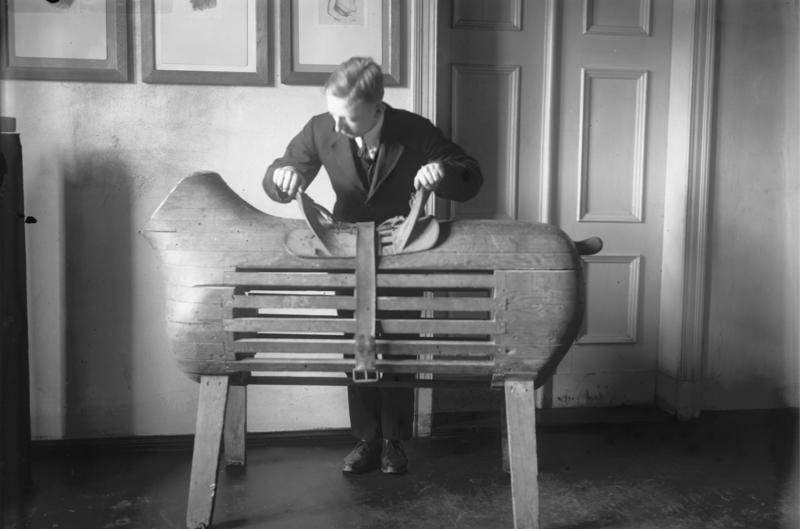
An early pommel horse

=== Dimensions ===
Measurements of the apparatus are published by the Fédération internationale de gymnastique (FIG) in the Apparatus Norms brochure.

- Height from top surface to floor: 115 centimetres (3.77 ft) ± 1 centimetre (0.39 in)
- Length at top: 160 centimetres (5.2 ft) ± 1 centimetre (0.39 in)
- Length at bottom: 155 centimetres (5.09 ft) ± 1 centimetre (0.39 in)
- Width at top: 35 centimetres (14 in) ± 1 centimetre (0.39 in)
- Width at bottom: 30 centimetres (12 in) ± 1 centimetre (0.39 in)
- Height of the pommels: 12 centimetres (4.7 in) ± 0.5 centimetres (0.20 in)
- Distance between the pommels: 40 centimetres (16 in) – 45 centimetres (18 in) (adjustable)

== Routines ==
A typical pommel horse exercise involves both single-leg and double-leg workouts. Single-leg skills are generally in the form of scissors. Double-leg workout, however, is the main staple of this event. The gymnast swings both legs in a circular motion (clockwise or counterclockwise, depending on preference) and performs such skills on all parts of the apparatus. To make the exercise more challenging, gymnasts will often include variations on a typical circling skill by turning (moores and spindles), straddling their legs (flares), placing one or both hands on the pommel or the leather, or moving up and down the horse placing their hands on the pommel or the leather (traveling). Routines end when the gymnast performs a dismount by swinging his body over the horse or going through a handstand to land on the mat. The pommel horse, its gymnastic elements, and various rules are all regulated by the Code of Points.

Pommel horse is considered one of the more difficult men's events. While it is well noted that all events require a particular build of muscle and technique, pommel horse tends to favor technique over muscle. This is because horse routines are done from the shoulders in a leaning motion, and no moves need to be held, unlike other events. Therefore, stress induced in one's arms is reduced, meaning less muscle is required for this event than in events like still rings or parallel bars.

=== International level routines ===
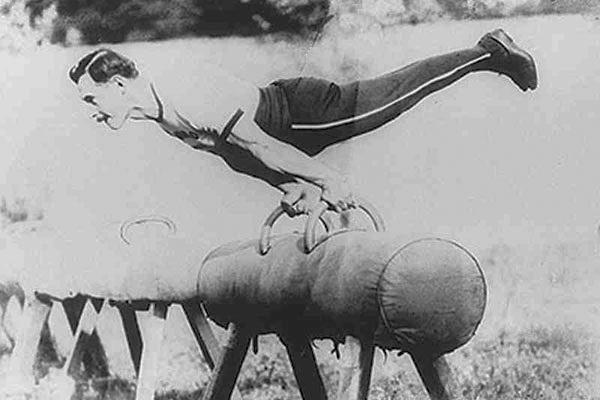
Alberto Braglia

A pommel horse routine should contain at least one element from all element groups:

- Single leg swings and scissors
- Circle and flairs, with and/or without spindles and handstands, Kehrswings, Russian wendeswings, flops and combined elements
- Travel type elements, including Tong Fei, Wu Guonian, Roth and Traveling Spindles
- Dismounts

=== Scoring and rules ===
Form is crucial to any successful routine, as with all events in the Fédération Internationale de Gymnastique (now World Gymnastics) guidelines. For pommel horse, form consists of keeping one's feet pointed and legs straight during the entire routine. Circles and flairs should be performed with full body extension; deductions are applied for insufficient extension and hip breaks. The gymnast should keep his legs together during all elements except for scissors, single-legged elements, and flairs, where the degree and control of separation are considered important. Angular deviations during flair and circle work are deducted based on the degree of deviation from the ideal cross or side support positions. Points are also deducted for pausing or stopping on the apparatus. Deductions also apply for brushing and hitting the apparatus.

== Olympic pommel horse medalists ==
The most decorated and successful Olympic pommel worker in history is Great Britain's Max Whitlock, with three medals, including two gold medals. Two other gymnasts have three pommel horse Olympic medals across three Games: Romania's Marius Urzică with one gold and two silver medals, and Whitlock's compatriot and teammate Louis Smith with two silvers, and a bronze—under historic rules Smith would have shared gold in 2012, but was awarded silver behind Kristian Berki after a tie was broken on execution score.

Three other pommel workers have two Olympic gold medals: the Soviet Union gymnast Boris Shakhlin, the Yugoslav gymnast Miroslav Cerar, and the Hungarian gymnast, Zoltán Magyar.

== Pommel horse medalists at the world championships ==
The pommel horse has been contested at the World Artistic Gymnastics Championships since their inauguration. The record for most world victories is held by several workers at three. Three of the four double Olympic champions, Miroslav Cerar, Zoltan Magyar, and Max Whitlock have each won the world title three times, to set the record for combined global titles at five. The most decorated workers at the World Championships are Whitlock and two one-time Olympic champions, Xiao Qin of China, and Hungary's Kristian Berki, all with three gold and two silver medals. Although Xiao and Berki each have won one Olympic gold, they are both considered to be among the major figures in the event's history along with the double Olympic champions.

Overall, Whitlock is the most successful and decorated pommel worker in the event's history, with five global gold medals, two silvers, and a bronze.
