= Krisztián Berki =

Hungarian gymnast (born 1985)

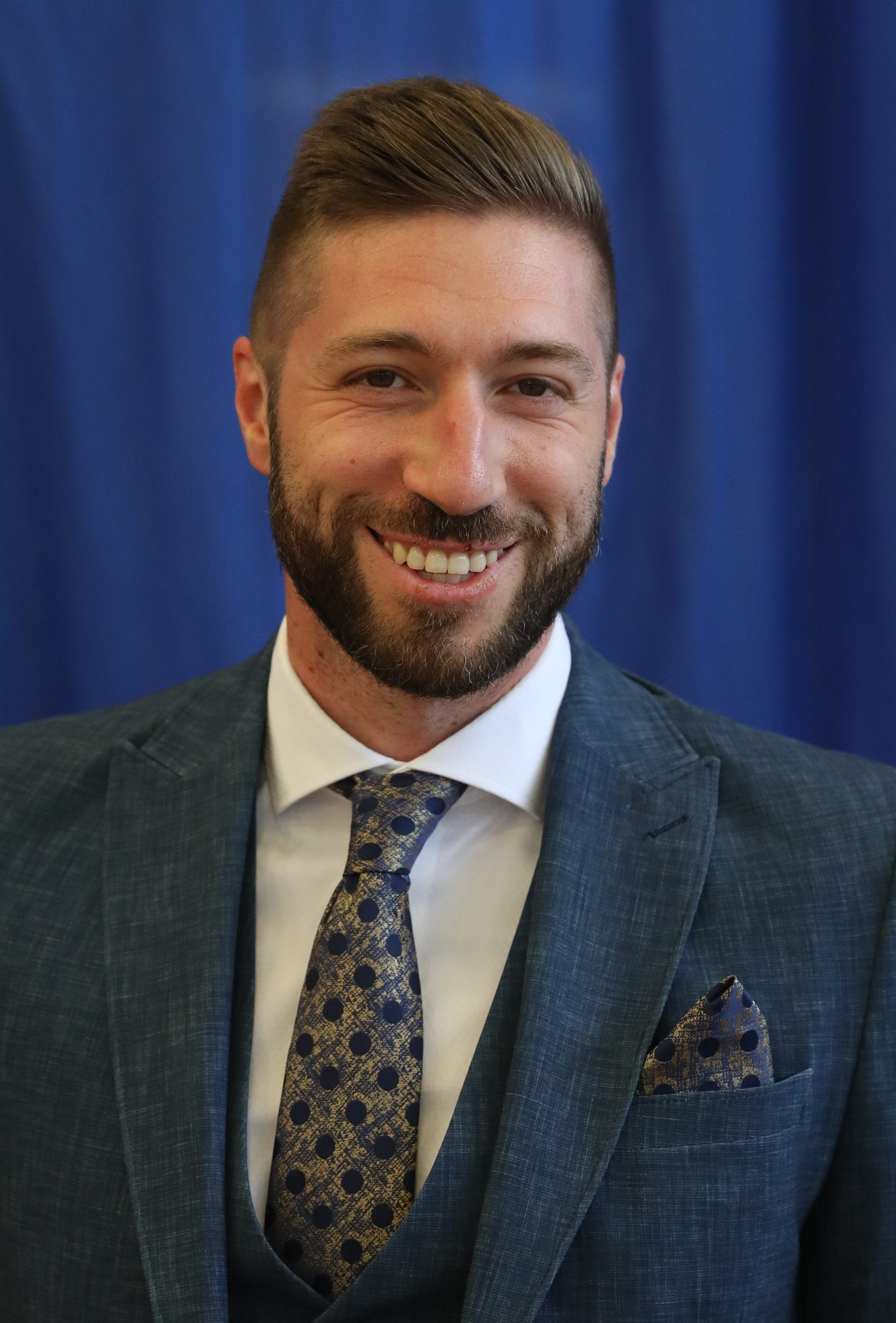
- Berki in 2023

Personal information
- Nickname: Hosszú
- Born: 18 March 1985 (age 41) Budapest, Hungary
- Height: 1.78 m (5 ft 10 in)

Gymnastics career
- Discipline: Men's artistic gymnastics
- Country represented: Hungary
- Club: Újpesti TE (2007–present); KSI (–2007)
- Head coach: István Kovács
- Eponymous skills: Berki (pommel horse)
- Retired: 2021
Medal record
Men's artistic gymnastics
Representing Hungary
Olympic Games
Gold medal – first place	2012 London	Pommel Horse
World Championships
Gold medal – first place	2010 Rotterdam	Pommel Horse
Gold medal – first place	2011 Tokyo	Pommel Horse
Gold medal – first place	2014 Nanning	Pommel Horse
Silver medal – second place	2007 Stuttgart	Pommel Horse
Silver medal – second place	2009 London	Pommel Horse
European Championships
Gold medal – first place	2005 Debrecen	Pommel Horse
Gold medal – first place	2007 Amsterdam	Pommel Horse
Gold medal – first place	2008 Lausanne	Pommel Horse
Gold medal – first place	2009 Milan	Pommel Horse
Gold medal – first place	2011 Berlin	Pommel Horse
Gold medal – first place	2012 Montpellier	Pommel Horse
Silver medal – second place	2013 Moscow	Pommel Horse
Silver medal – second place	2017 Cluj-Napoca	Pommel Horse
Bronze medal – third place	2004 Ljubljana	Pommel Horse
Universiade
Gold medal – first place	2009 Belgrade	Pommel Horse

Krisztián Berki (Hungarian pronunciation: [ˈkristiaːn ˈbɛrki]; born 18 March 1985 in Budapest) is a Hungarian former artistic gymnast. During his gymnastics career, he was a pommel horse specialist. He is the 2012 Olympic Champion and is a three-time World Champion on the apparatus.

== Gymnastics career ==
On the pommel horse, Berki is the 2012 Olympic Champion, the 2010, 2011, and 2014 World Champion, and the 2007 and 2009 World silver medalist. He is also the 2005, 2007, 2008, 2009, 2011 and 2012 European Champion in that event. Additionally he won gold at the 2009 Universiade in Belgrade. In 2010 and 2011, he was elected Hungarian Sportsman of the year for his achievements.

In 2016, a pommel horse element of difficulty level 'E' was named after him.

=== 2012 Summer Olympics ===
At the 2012 Summer Olympics, Berki competed in and won the pommel horse competition, winning the gold medal with a score of 16.066, exactly the same score as British athlete Louis Smith, but was awarded the gold on a higher execution score.

Awards
Preceded by Dániel Gyurta; Dániel Gyurta	Hungarian Sportsman of The Year; 2010–2011; 2014	Succeeded by Dániel Gyurta; László Cseh
