= Dutch Artistic Gymnastics Championships =

The Dutch Championships in Artistic Gymnastics is an annual competition inviting Dutch gymnasts as well as others worldwide. It also serves as the National Championships for the Dutch gymnasts.

== List ==
Year	Games	Host
2009	2009 Dutch Artistic Gymnastics Championships	(Netherlands) Rotterdam
2012	2012 Dutch Artistic Gymnastics Championships	(Netherlands) Rotterdam
2013	2013 Dutch Artistic Gymnastics Championships	(Netherlands) Rotterdam
2014	2014 Dutch Artistic Gymnastics Championships	(Netherlands) Rotterdam
2015	2015 Dutch Artistic Gymnastics Championships	(Netherlands) Rotterdam
2016	2016 Dutch Artistic Gymnastics Championships	(Netherlands) Rotterdam
2017	2017 Dutch Artistic Gymnastics Championships	(Netherlands) Rotterdam
2018	2018 Dutch Artistic Gymnastics Championships	(Netherlands) Rotterdam

== All-Around Champions ==
In 2012, the National Championships were used to see who would be chosen to represent the Netherlands at the 2012 London Olympic Games, as they had not qualified a team and only had one representative. Céline van Gerner won the title of National Champion, and so she was chosen to represent the Netherlands.

Year	Senior	Junior	Youth
2012	Céline van Gerner	Chantysha Netteb	Unknown
2013	Vera van Pol	Eythora Thorsdottir	Unknown
2014	Lisa Top	Tisha Volleman	Sanna Veerman
2015	Vera van Pol	Morgan Lynn Spruijtenburg	Sanna Veerman
2016	Eythora Thorsdottir	Sanna Veerman	Astrid de Zeeuw
2017	Tisha Volleman	Astrid de Zeeuw	Unknown
2018	Vera van Pol	Astrid de Zeeuw	Unknown

== Vault ==
Year	Senior	Junior	Youth
2012	Wyomi Masela	Chantysha Netteb	Unknown
2013	Unknown	Eythora Thorsdottir	Unknown
2014	Noël van Klaveren	Isa Maassen	Sanna Veerman
2015	Vera van Pol	Sophie van Beek	Sanna Veerman
2016	Vera van Pol	Sanna Veerman	Juliette Pijnacker
2017	Tisha Volleman	Sanna Veerman	Unknown
2018	Tisha Volleman	Astrid de Zeeuw	Unknown

== Uneven bars ==
Year	Senior	Junior	Youth
2012	Wyomi Masela	Chantysha Netteb	Unknown
2013	Unknown	Eythora Thorsdottir	Unknown
2014	Vera van Pol	Dana de Groot	Sanna Veerman
2015	Sanne Wevers	Sering Perdok	Sanna Veerman
2016	Laura Waem	Sanna Veerman	Astrid de Zeewu
2017	Naomi Visser	Laura de Witt	Unknown
2018	Céline van Gerner	Astrid de Zeeuw	Unknown

== Balance beam ==
Year	Senior	Junior	Youth
2012	Céline van Gerner	Chantysha Netteb	Unknown
2013	Unknown	Eythora Thorsdottir	Unknown
2014	Sanne Wevers	Helen Houbraken	Juliette Berens
2015	Sanne Wevers	Marieke van Egmond	Sanna Veerman
2016	Sanne Wevers	Maud Lammertink	Astrid de Zeewu
2017	Tisha Volleman	Sara van Disseldorp	Unknown
2018	Sanne Wevers	Senna Westen	Unknown

== Floor exercise ==
Year	Senior	Junior	Youth
2012	Lisa Top	Eythora Thorsdottir	Unknown
2013	Unknown	Unknown	Unknown
2014	Lisa Top	Tisha Volleman	Juliette Berens
2015	Vera van Pol	Marieke van Egmond	Bogusia Rossen
2016	Axelle Klinckaert	Naomi Visser	Laura de Witt
2017	Tisha Volleman	Sara van Disseldorp	Unknown
2018	Tisha Volleman	Sara van Disseldorp	Unknown
