= 2009 Dutch Artistic Gymnastics Championships =

The 2009 Dutch Artistic Gymnastics Championships took place in Rotterdam, Netherlands, from 20-21 June 2009.

== Medalists ==
Event	Gold	Silver	Bronze
Seniors
All-Around	Lichelle Wong (NED)	Mayra Kroonen (NED)	Sanne Wevers (NED)
Vault	Mayra Kroonen (NED)	Fieke Willems (NED)	Joy Goedkoop (NED)
Uneven Bars	Natasja Blind (NED)	Lichelle Wong (NED)	Sherine El-Zeiny (NED)
Balance Beam	Sanne Wevers (NED)	Mayra Kroonen (NED)	Joy Goedkoop (NED)
Floor	Mayra Kroonen (NED)	Natasja Blind (NED)	Marlies Rijken (NED)
Juniors
All-Around	Céline van Gerner (NED)	Naoual Ouazzani-Chahdi (NED)	Lisa Burg (NED)
Vault	Naoual Ouazzani-Chahdi (NED)	Céline van Gerner (NED)	Melissa Scherpenisse (NED)
Uneven Bars	Naoual Ouazzani-Chahdi (NED)	Céline van Gerner (NED)	Tess Moonen (NED)
Balance Beam	Céline van Gerner (NED)	Tess Moonen (NED)	Naoual Ouazzani-Chahdi (NED)
Floor	Céline van Gerner (NED)	Naoual Ouazzani-Chahdi (NED)	Shirley de Boer (NED)
Youth
All-Around	Reina Beltman (NED)	Maartje Ruikes (NED)	Lisa Top (NED)
Vault	Jamie Braakman (NED)	Reina Beltman (NED)	Chantysha Netteb (NED)
Uneven Bars	Jamie Braakman (NED)	Lisa Top (NED)	Reina Beltman (NED)
Balance Beam	Jamie Braakman (NED)	Reina Beltman (NED)	Maartje Ruikes (NED)
Floor	Jamie Braakman (NED)	Maartje Ruikes (NED)	Julia Bombach (NED)
