= 2012 Dutch Artistic Gymnastics Championships =

The 2012 Dutch Artistic Gymnastics Championships were held from 16-17 June in Rotterdam.

== Medalists ==
Event	Gold	Silver	Bronze
Seniors
All-Around	Céline van Gerner (NED)	Lisa Top (NED)	Wyomi Masela (NED)
Vault	Wyomi Masela (NED)	Noël van Klaveren (NED)	Céline van Gener (NED)
Uneven Bars	Wyomi Masela (NED)	Céline van Gerner (NED)	Vera van Pol (NED)
Balance Beam	Céline van Gerner (NED)	Wyomi Masela (NED)	Lisa Top (NED)
Floor	Lisa Top (NED)	Céline van Gerner (NED)	Vera van Pol (NED)
Juniors
All-Around	Chantysha Netteb (NED)	Eythora Thorsdottir (NED)	Daphne Slingerland (NED)
Vault	Chantysha Netteb (NED)	Marinke Jakobs (NED)	Sanna Overbeek (NED)
Uneven Bars	Chantysha Netteb (NED)	Eythora Thorsdottir (NED)	Sanna Overbeek (NED)
Balance Beam	Chantysha Netteb (NED)	Daphne Slingerland (NED)	Marinke Jakobs (NED)
Floor	Eythora Thorsdottir (NED)	Chantysha Netteb (NED)	Shirley van Deene (NED)
