= 2015 Dutch Artistic Gymnastics Championships =

The 2015 Dutch Championships took place in Rotterdam, Netherlands, and it served as the National Championships for Dutch gymnasts.

== Format ==
The opening day of the competition featured the all-around competition, which served a dual purpose: determining the all-around champions and acting as a qualification round for the individual event finals. In the event finals, the top eight gymnasts on each apparatus competed. Unlike some competitions, there were no restrictions on the number of athletes from a single team who could participate in either the all-around or the event finals. Gymnasts were categorized into senior, junior, and youth divisions.

== Medalists ==
Event	Gold	Silver	Bronze
Seniors
All-Around	Vera van Pol (NED)	Mara Titarsolej (NED)	Tisha Volleman (NED)
Vault	Vera van Pol (NED)	Maartje Ruikes (NED)	Dyonnailys Supriana (NED)
Uneven Bars	Sanne Wevers (NED)	Mara Titarsolej (NED)	Maartje Ruikes (NED)
Balance Beam	Sanne Wevers (NED)	Vera van Pol (NED)	Tisha Volleman (NED)
Floor	Vera van Pol (NED)	Tisha Volleman (NED)	Dyonnailys Supriana (NED)

Event	Gold	Silver	Bronze
Juniors
All-Around	Morgan Lynn Spruijtenburg (NED)	Sering Perdok (NED)	Marieke van Egmond (NED)
Vault	Sophie van Beek (NED)	Sering Perdok (NED)	Morgan Lynn Spruijtenburg (NED)
Uneven Bars	Sering Perdok (NED)	Morgan Lynn Spruijtenburg (NED)	Kirsten Polderman (NED)
Balance Beam	Marieke van Egmond (NED)	Marisa Koedoot (NED)	Mirte de Reiger (NED)
Floor	Marieke van Egmond (NED)	Kirsten Polderman (NED)	Naomi Visser (NED)
