= Lieke Wevers =

Dutch artistic gymnast (born 1991)

- Born: 17 September 1991 (age 35) Leeuwarden, Friesland, Netherlands
- Height: 1.67 m (5 ft 6 in)
- Relatives: Sanne Wevers

Gymnastics career
- Discipline: Women's artistic gymnastics
- Country represented: Netherlands; (2009–2021, 2024–2026)
- Club: Topsport Noord Heerenveen
- Head coach: Vincent Wevers
- Retired: June 12, 2026
Medal record
Representing Netherlands
European Games
Gold medal – first place	2015 Baku	Balance beam
Bronze medal – third place	2015 Baku	Team
Bronze medal – third place	2015 Baku	All-around
Bronze medal – third place	2015 Baku	Floor exercise
FIG World Cup
Event / 1st / 2nd / 3rd; Apparatus World Cup / 0 / 1 / 0

Lieke Wevers (born 17 September 1991) is a Dutch former artistic gymnast. She was the first Dutch woman to win a European title in gymnastics: at the 2015 European Games, she won the gold medal on the balance beam. That year, she was also the bronze medalist with the Dutch team, in the individual all-around, and on floor exercise. She competed at the 2016, 2020, and 2024 Summer Olympics, qualifying for the all-around finals in 2020.

== Early life ==
Wevers was born on 17 September 1991 in Leeuwarden. She is six minutes younger than her fraternal twin, Sanne. They were both members of the Dutch national gymnastics team and are coached by their father Vincent Wevers in Heerenveen.

== Career ==
=== 2009–2013 ===
Wevers did not compete in any major international competitions until 2009 because of injuries. Her international debut was at the 2009 Cottbus World Cup, where she won silver on the beam behind Marta Pihan-Kulesza of Poland and finished eighth on the uneven bars. However, at the 2009 European Championships, she tore her ACL and did not compete for another two years.

Wevers returned to competition at the 2011 World Championships. In the qualification round, she competed on bars, beam, and floor to help the Dutch team finish in thirteenth. This result qualified them for the 2012 Olympic Test Event, but at the Test Event, the team finished in eighth and did not qualify for the Olympics. Afterward, Wevers had surgery on both of her wrists and missed the entire 2013 season.

=== 2014–2016 ===
Wevers returned to competition in 2014. She competed with the Dutch team at a friendly meet where they lost to Great Britain. She competed at the 2014 European Championships with her sister, and they helped the Netherlands finish ninth. These European Championships marked the first time both of the Wevers twins competed together at a major international competition. At the Dutch Championships, she only competed on the beam and finished fifth. She then helped the Dutch team defeat France and Austria at a friendly meet in Rouen. At the 2014 World Championships, Wevers helped the Dutch team finish tenth in the qualification round.

Wevers began the 2015 season at the Sidikj Tournament where she won the gold medal on the balance beam. Then at the FIT Challenge, she helped the Dutch team finish seventh. At the 2015 European Games, she won a gold medal on the balance beam and bronze medals with the Dutch team, in the all-around, and on floor exercise. She then competed at a friendly meet where the Dutch team lost to Great Britain. She was selected to compete at the World Championships in Glasgow alongside her sister Sanne, Eythora Thorsdottir, Tisha Volleman, Mara Titarsolej, and Lisa Top. In the qualification round, the team beat out Brazil by less than half of a point for the eighth and final Olympic qualification spot. This marked the first time the Netherlands qualified as a team for the Olympic Games since 1976. The team once again finished eighth in the team final. Individually, she qualified for the all-around final where she finished thirteenth and for the floor exercise final where she finished eighth.

Wevers competed at the 2016 Olympic Test Event and won the bronze medal on the balance beam. She finished tenth in the all-around at the Dutch Championships. She was named to represent the Netherlands at the 2016 Summer Olympics alongside Sanne Wevers, Eythora Thorsdottir, Céline van Gerner, and Vera van Pol, and her father Vincent Wevers was also selected to travel to Rio de Janeiro as a coach. The Dutch team competed in the team final and finished seventh. Wevers qualified for the individual all-around final and finished twentieth.

=== 2017–2024 ===
In September 2017, Wevers competed at the Dutch Invitational and finished sixth in the balance beam final. Then at the Paris World Challenge Cup, she did not qualify for the balance beam final. She competed on the balance beam at the 2017 World Championships, but she did not advance to the final. After the World Championships, she competed at the Toyota International and finished fourth on the balance beam.

Wevers took the 2018 season off to rest her body and travel.

Wevers returned to competition at the 2019 FIG Challenge and won the gold medal with the senior Dutch team. Then at the Dutch Championships, she won the silver medal in the all-around behind Naomi Visser, and she won the gold medals on the uneven bars and floor exercise. In August, she competed at the Heerenveen Friendly where she helped the Netherlands win silver in the team competition behind Italy. Individually, she finished seventh in the all-around but recorded the highest floor exercise score of the competition. The following month she competed at the Second Heerenveen Friendly where she helped the Netherlands finish first, and she placed fourth in the all-around. She then competed at the World Championships in Stuttgart alongside Eythora Thorsdottir, Sanne Wevers, Tisha Volleman, and Naomi Visser. The team finished sixth during the qualification round and qualified a team spot for the 2020 Olympic Games, and then in the team final, they finished eighth.

Wevers did not compete in 2020 due to the COVID-19 pandemic. She returned to competition at the 2021 Heerenveen Friendly and won the gold medal in the all-around. She then competed at the 2021 European Championships in Basel where she finished eighth in the all-around. She also qualified for the balance beam final where she finished seventh. On 27 June 2021, Wevers was selected to represent the Netherlands at the 2020 Summer Olympics alongside Eythora Thorsdottir, Vera van Pol, and Sanne Wevers. In the qualification round, the team finished eleventh and did not qualify for the team final. Individually, she qualified for the all-around final and finished twenty-fourth.

Wevers moved to Oslo and began coaching while also continuing to train.

== Post-competitive career ==
In June 2026, it was announced that Wevers would become assistant coach of the Spanish women's national team, working with her partner, Russian coach Anton Stolyar. A few months later, in October, their contract was terminated, allegedly due to Stolyar behaving aggressively toward Wevers.

== Personal life ==
Wevers studied psychology at Open University of the Netherlands and speaks Dutch, English, German, and French.

== Competitive history ==
Year	Event	Team	AA	VT	UB	BB	FX
2009	Cottbus World Cup				8	2nd place, silver medalist(s)	
2011
2011	World Championships	13					
2012	Olympic Test Event	8					
2014	GBR-NED Friendly	2nd place, silver medalist(s)					
2014	European Championships	R1					
2014	Dutch Championships		11			5	
2014	Rencontre Internationale	1st place, gold medalist(s)					
2014	World Championships	10					
2015	Sidijk Tournament					1st place, gold medalist(s)	
2015	FIT Challenge	7	8				
2015	European Games	3rd place, bronze medalist(s)	3rd place, bronze medalist(s)			1st place, gold medalist(s)	3rd place, bronze medalist(s)
2015	GBR-NED Friendly	2nd place, silver medalist(s)					
2015	World Championships	8	13				8
2016	Olympic Test Event					3rd place, bronze medalist(s)	
2016	Dutch Championships		10				
2016	Olympic Games	7	20				
2017	Dutch Invitational					1st place, gold medalist(s)	
2017	Toyota International					4	
2019	FIT Challenge	1st place, gold medalist(s)	5				
2019	Dutch Championships		2nd place, silver medalist(s)		1st place, gold medalist(s)	3rd place, bronze medalist(s)	1st place, gold medalist(s)
2019	Heerenveen Friendly	2nd place, silver medalist(s)	7				
2019	Second Heerenveen Friendly	1st place, gold medalist(s)	4				
2019	World Championships	8					
2021	Heerenveen Friendly		1st place, gold medalist(s)				
2021	European Championships		8			7	
2021	Olympic Games	11	24				
2024
2024	European Championships	7					
2024	Olympic Games	9					
