= 2014 Dutch Artistic Gymnastics Championships =

The 2014 Dutch Artistic Gymnastics Championships took place in Rotterdam from 21-22 June.

== Medalists ==
Event	Gold	Silver	Bronze
Seniors
All-Around	Lisa Top (NED)	Maartje Ruikes (NED)	Vera van Pol (NED)
Vault	Noël van Klaveren (NED)	Vera van Pol (NED)	Kimberley van der Zal (NED)
Uneven Bars	Vera van Pol (NED)	Sanne Wevers (NED)	Lisa Top (NED)
Balance Beam	Sanne Wevers (NED)	Maartje Ruikes (NED)	Shirley van Deene (NED)
Floor	Lisa Top (NED)	Vera van Pol (NED)	Noël van Klaveren (NED)
Juniors
All-Around	Tisha Volleman (NED)	Kirsten Polderman (NED)	Isa Maassen (NED)
Vault	Isa Maassen (NED)	Chiara Frisina Fauste (NED)	Dyonnailys Supriana (NED)
Uneven Bars	Dana de Groot (NED)	Tisha Volleman (NED)	Kirsten Polderman (NED)
Balance Beam	Helene Houbraken (NED)	Margo van der Steen (NED)	Sering Perdok (NED)
Floor	Tisha Volleman (NED)	Meike Stroot (NED)	Dyonnailys Supriana (NED)
Youth
All-Around	Sanna Veerman (NED)	Juliette Berens (NED)	Naomi Visser (NED)
Vault	Sanna Veerman (NED)	Juliette Berens (NED)	Nikki Broeksma (NED)
Uneven Bars	Sanna Veerman (NED)	Juliette Berens (NED)	Naomi Visser (NED)
Balance Beam	Juliette Berens (NED)	Marieke van Egmond (NED)	Naomi Visser (NED)
Floor	Juliette Berens (NED)	Marieke van Egmond (NED)	Naomi Visser (NED)
