= Maartje Ruikes =

Dutch artistic gymnast

- Born: 27 June 1996 (age 30) Zevenaar, Netherlands

Gymnastics career
- Discipline: Women's artistic gymnastics
- Country represented: Netherlands
- Club: Hazenkamp
- Head coach: Edwin Zegers
- Retired: 2017

Maartje Ruikes (born 27 June 1996) is a Dutch former artistic gymnast.

== Gymnastics career ==
Ruikes competed at the 2014 GBR-NED International Friendly where she tied for the all-around gold medal with Jin Yi Hoekstra and won the bronze medal on the balance beam behind Lieke Wevers and Ruby Harrold. At the 2014 Dutch Championships, she won the silver medal in the all-around behind Lisa Top. At the Rencontre Internationale, the Dutch team won over France and Austria, and Ruikes won the gold medal on the vault. She was then selected to compete at the 2014 World Championships alongside Lisa Top, Lieke Wevers, Céline van Gerner, Vera van Pol, and Sanne Wevers, and the team finished 10th in the qualification round. Ruikes had her balance beam mount named after her at the World Championships as she was the first one to perform it at a major international competition.

Ruikes competed at the 2015 Flanders International Team Challenge where the Dutch team finished 7th. She also competed at the Netherlands-Great Britain Friendly where the Dutch team finished 2nd, and individually, Ruikes finished 10th in the all-around.

At the 2016 Sidijk Tournament, Ruikes won the silver medal on the uneven bars behind Lisa Top, but on the floor exercise, she tore her Achilles tendon- taking her out of contention for the 2016 Olympic team. After over one year of rehab and two surgeries, Ruikes decided to retire.
