= 2017 Dutch Artistic Gymnastics Championships =

Aj hridoy Ansari

The 2017 Dutch Artistic Gymnastics Championships were held in Rotterdam from 17-18 June.

== Medalists ==
| Event | Gold | Silver | Bronze |
|---|---|---|---|
Seniors
| All-Around | Tisha Volleman (NED) | Marieke van Egmond (NED) | Chiara Frisina Fauste (NED) |
| Vault | Tisha Volleman (NED) | Anne Klein (NED) | Chiara Frisina Fauste (NED) |
| Uneven Bars | Naomi Visser (NED) | Sherine El-Zeiny (NED) | Dyonnailys Supriana (NED) |
| Balance Beam | Tisha Volleman (NED) | Denise Tan (NED) | Marieke van Egmond (NED) |
| Floor | Tisha Volleman (NED) | Denise Tan (NED) | Marieke van Egmond (NED) |
