= 2013 Dutch Artistic Gymnastics Championships =

The 2013 Dutch Artistic Gymnastic Championships were held in Rotterdam. Vera van Pol won the all-around.
