= Ana Poščić =

Croatian artistic gymnast (born 1998)

- Born: 24 November 1998 (age 27) Rijeka, Croatia

Gymnastics career
- Discipline: Women's artistic gymnastics
- Country represented: Croatia (2012–2017)

Ana Poščić (born 24 November 1998) is a Croatian former artistic gymnast. She represented her nation at international competitions, including at the 2014 European Championships and the 2015 European Games. She also competed at the 2012 Junior European Championships.

== Gymnastics career ==
At the 2012 Austrian Team Open, Poščić finished 28th in the all-around. She then competed at the 2012 Junior European Championships with the Croatian team that finished 16th. At the 2012 Alpen Adria Cup, she finished seventh in the all-around. She finished 20th in the all-around at the 2013 Zelena Jama Open held in Ljubljana. She then finished 15th in the junior all-around at the 2013 KSI Matsz Cup in Budapest.

Poščić became age-eligible for senior international competitions in 2014. She competed on the balance beam and floor exercise at the 2014 Osijek World Challenge Cup but did not advance into the finals. She competed at the 2014 European Championships and contributed on the uneven bars, balance beam, and floor exercise toward the Croatian team's 20th-place finish. Poščić was selected to represent Croatia at the 2015 European Games alongside Ana Đerek and Dina Madir, and they finished 17th in the team competition.

Poščić only competed on the floor exercise at the 2016 World Challenge Cups in Ljubljana and Osijek, but she did not advance into the finals after finishing 12th and 15th, respectively. She also only competed on the floor exercise in the 2017 World Challenge Cup stages in Koper, Osijek, and Paris and did not advance into any of the finals. She finished 21st in Koper, 19th in Osijek, and 31st in Paris. She stopped competing in international events in 2017.
