= Gymnastics at the 2015 European Games – Women's artistic team all-around =

Women's artistic team all-around at the 2015 European Games
- Venue: National Gymnastics Arena
- Date: 14–15 June
- Competitors: 75 from 25 nations
- Winning score: 116.897

Medalists
gold medal	Viktoria Komova; Aliya Mustafina; Seda Tutkhalyan	Russia
silver medal	Leah Griesser; Elisabeth Seitz; Sophie Scheder	Germany
bronze medal	Lisa Top; Céline van Gerner; Lieke Wevers	Netherlands

The Women's artistic gymnastics team all-around competition at the 2015 European Games was held at the National Gymnastics Arena, Baku on 14 and 15 June 2015. The team final also served as a qualification round for the all-around and event finals.

== Qualification ==
The top 25 teams and the host team, Azerbaijan, at the 2014 European Women's Artistic Gymnastics Championships qualified 3 spots for the team competition.

Event	Criterion	Athletes per NOC	Qualified
Teams
Host quota		3	Azerbaijan
2014 European Championships	Team places 1–25	3	Great Britain; Romania; Russia; Italy; Germany; Switzerland; Belgium; Spain; Netherlands; Poland; France; Sweden; Hungary; Austria; Czech Republic; Belarus; Ukraine; Ireland; Croatia; Greece; Iceland; Norway; Latvia; Denmark; Bulgaria

== Results ==
Rank	Team	Vault (gymnastics)	Uneven bars	Balance beam	Floor (gymnastics)	Total
1st place, gold medalist(s)	Russia	30.099 (1)	30.066 (1)	29.166 (1)	27.566 (2)	116.897
1st place, gold medalist(s)	Aliya Mustafina	15.133	15.200	14.566	13.966	116.897
1st place, gold medalist(s)	Seda Tutkhalyan	14.966	14.166	14.600	13.600	116.897
1st place, gold medalist(s)	Viktoria Komova	14.566	14.866	14.233	13.300	116.897
2nd place, silver medalist(s)	Germany	28.066 (7)	30.000 (2)	25.899 (8)	26.432 (9)	110.397
2nd place, silver medalist(s)	Sophie Scheder	14.033	15.000	14.133	13.266	110.397
2nd place, silver medalist(s)	Elisabeth Seitz	14.033	15.000	11.033	12.866	110.397
2nd place, silver medalist(s)	Leah Griesser	13.133	12.566	11.766	13.166	110.397
3rd place, bronze medalist(s)	Netherlands	27.933 (10)	27.500 (4)	27.766 (2)	26.900 (4)	110.099
3rd place, bronze medalist(s)	Lieke Wevers	13.533	13.600	14.066	13.900	110.099
3rd place, bronze medalist(s)	Céline van Gerner	13.800	13.900	13.700	13.000	110.099
3rd place, bronze medalist(s)	Lisa Top	14.133	13.566	11.833	12.000	110.099
4	France	28.233 (4)	26.466 (8)	27.266 (4)	26.866 (5)	108.831
4	Valentine Pikul	14.100	13.433	13.433	13.600	108.831
4	Marine Brevet	14.133	13.033	13.600	13.266	108.831
4	Anne Kuhm	13.900	12.800	13.666	12.766	108.831
5	Italy	28.066 (7)	27.132 (5)	26.933 (6)	26.666 (7)	108.797
5	Tea Ugrin	13.900	13.766	13.533	13.566	108.797
5	Giorgia Campana	13.833	12.766	13.400	13.100	108.797
5	Alessia Leolini	14.166	13.366	12.166	12.766	108.797
6	Switzerland	29.266 (2)	25.966 (9)	27.066 (5)	26.466 (8)	108.764
6	Giulia Steingruber	15.466	13.066	14.400	13.633	108.764
6	Jessica Diacci	13.800	12.900	11.333	12.566	108.764
6	Caterina Barloggio		10.266	12.666	12.833	108.764
7	Romania	29.133 (3)	24.233 (12)	27.500 (3)	27.633 (1)	108.499
7	Andreea Iridon	12.566	13.733	14.100	12.600	108.499
7	Laura Jurca	14.800	10.433	13.400	13.700	108.499
7	Silvia Zarzu	14.333	10.500	11.966	13.933	108.499
8	Great Britain	28.199 (5)	26.633 (7)	26.366 (7)	26.766 (6)	107.964
8	Kelly Simm	14.233	12.933	12.533	13.600	107.964
8	Charlie Fellows	13.966	13.700	10.966	13.166	107.964
8	Georgina Hockenhull	13.533	11.166	13.833	12.600	107.964
9	Hungary	28.132 (6)	27.832 (3)	25.232 (10)	25.966 (10)	107.162
9	Dorina Böczögő	14.066	13.366	12.766	13.566	107.162
9	Noémi Makra	14.066	14.466	12.466	12.400	107.162
9	Luca Diveky	13.666	11.700	11.333		107.162
10	Belgium	27.699 (13)	26.766 (6)	25.133 (12)	27.200 (3)	106.798
10	Gaelle Mys	13.866	12.100	13.500	13.600	106.798
10	Lisa Verschueren	13.700	13.400	11.633	13.600	106.798
10	Cindy Vandenhole	13.833	13.366	11.166	13.333	106.798
11	Poland	28.066 (7)	25.133 (10)	25.599 (9)	25.532 (11)	104.330
11	Gabriela Janik	14.400	13.233	12.566	12.166	104.330
11	Katarzyna Jurkowska-Kowalska	13.666	11.900	13.033	13.366	104.330
11	Paula Plichta		11.533			104.330
12	Spain	27.766 (12)	24.466 (11)	24.633 (14)	25.066 (12)	101.931
12	Ainhoa Carmona	13.900	12.366	12.833	12.233	101.931
12	Ana Pérez	13.600	12.100	11.800	12.833	101.931
12	Claudia Colom	13.866	11.200	11.800	11.466	101.931
13	Azerbaijan	26.132 (22)	22.966 (16)	25.232 (10)	24.800 (13)	99.130
13	Marina Nekrasova	13.566	11.300	12.966	12.700	99.130
13	Yulia Inshina	12.566	10.700	12.266	12.100	99.130
13	Kristina Pravdina	11.266	11.666	12.033		99.130
14	Ukraine	27.833 (11)	24.132 (13)	23.800 (21)	22.933 (24)	98.698
14	Angelina Kysla	13.733	13.566	11.433	11.700	98.698
14	Krystyna Sankova	14.100	10.566	12.100	11.133	98.698
14	Yana Fedorova	12.533	10.366	11.700	11.233	98.698
15	Czech Republic	25.866 (25)	23.066 (14)	24.366 (17)	24.732 (15)	98.030
15	Veronika Cenková	12.600	11.366	12.800	12.166	98.030
15	Anna-Mária Kányai	13.266	11.200	11.566	12.566	98.030
15	Petra Fialová	11.633	11.700	10.400		98.030
16	Greece	26.433 (20)	22.199 (17)	24.633 (14)	23.866 (19)	97.131
16	Vasiliki Millousi	13.233	12.933	13.600	11.700	97.131
16	Ioanna Xoulogi	12.766	9.266	11.033	11.566	97.131
16	Myropi Christofilaki	13.200	8.600	9.766	12.166	97.131
17	Croatia	26.766 (17)	21.333 (20)	23.966 (20)	24.400 (16)	96.465
17	Ana Đerek	13.866	10.600	12.900	12.600	96.465
17	Dina Madir	12.900	10.733	11.066	11.566	96.465
17	Ana Poščić	12.466	8.933	8.133	11.800	96.465
18	Ireland	27.033 (15)	20.866 (24)	24.500 (16)	23.633 (21)	96.032
18	Ellis O'Reilly	13.733	10.366	11.800	12.133	96.032
18	Nicole Mawhinney	13.300	10.500	11.800	11.200	96.032
18	Tara Donnelly	13.200	8.900	12.700	11.500	96.032
19	Iceland	27.399 (14)	21.733 (19)	22.999 (22)	23.866 (19)	95.997
19	Dominiqua Belanyi	13.100	11.700	12.233	11.333	95.997
19	Norma Róbertsdóttir	14.166	9.566	10.366	12.100	95.997
19	Thelma Hermannsdóttir	13.233	10.033	10.766	11.766	95.997
20	Belarus	25.900 (24)	20.899 (23)	25.066 (13)	24.099 (17)	95.964
20	Aliaksandra Koshaleva	12.666	9.400	12.400	12.233	95.964
20	Natallia Yakubava	12.800	11.333	10.100	11.733	95.964
20	Sviatlana Lifenka	13.100	9.566	12.666	11.866	95.964
21	Austria	26.733 (18)	22.100 (18)	22.032 (23)	24.032 (18)	94.897
21	Jasmin Mader	13.800	12.500	10.466	12.666	94.897
21	Marlies Mannersdorfer	12.933	9.600	11.566	11.366	94.897
21	Jessica Stebinger		9.233			94.897
22	Denmark	26.032 (23)	23.066 (14)	21.000 (24)	23.232 (23)	93.330
22	Mette Hulgaard	13.166	10.533	11.400	11.866	93.330
22	Linnea Wang	12.866	11.033	9.600	11.366	93.330
22	Michelle Lauritsen	12.466	12.033			93.330
23	Norway	26.166 (21)	20.933 (22)	24.200 (18)	21.966 (25)	93.265
23	Martine Skregelid	13.166	10.533	12.300	10.600	93.265
23	Solveig Berg	12.900	10.400	11.900	10.433	93.265
23	Sofie Braaten	13.000	9.500	11.266	11.366	93.265
24	Latvia	26.600 (19)	18.699 (25)	23.999 (19)	23.553 (22)	92.831
24	Alīna Circene	12.833	8.433	11.566	10.933	92.831
24	Valērija Grišāne	13.500	10.266	12.433	12.600	92.831
24	Diana Jerofejeva	13.100	8.200	10.533	10.666	92.831
25	Bulgaria	26.999 (16)	21.332 (21)	18.899 (25)	24.800 (13)	92.030
25	Ralitsa Mileva	13.533	9.766	10.233	12.100	92.030
25	Albena Zlatkova	13.466	9.866	8.600	12.700	92.030
25	Valentina Rashkova	12.100	11.466	8.666	11.266	92.030

== Qualification for finals ==
This competition also served as the qualification round for the all-around final and the event finals. The top 18 gymnasts with only one per country qualified for the all-around final. The top 6 gymnasts on each event with only one per country qualified for the event finals.

=== All-Around ===
Rank	Gymnast	Nation	Vault (gymnastics)	Uneven bars	Balance beam	Floor (gymnastics)	Total	Qual.
1	Aliya Mustafina	Russia	15.133	15.200	14.566	13.966	58.865	Q
4	Giulia Steingruber	Switzerland	15.466	13.066	14.400	13.633	56.565	Q
5	Sophie Scheder	Germany	14.033	15.000	14.133	13.266	56.432	Q
6	Lieke Wevers	Netherlands	13.533	13.600	14.066	13.900	55.099	Q
7	Tea Ugrin	Italy	13.900	13.766	13.533	13.566	54.765	Q
8	Valentine Pikul	France	14.100	13.433	13.433	13.600	54.566	Q
11	Dorina Böczögő	Hungary	14.066	13.366	12.766	13.566	53.764	Q
13	Kelly Simm	Great Britain	14.233	12.933	12.533	13.600	53.299	Q
16	Gaelle Mys	Belgium	13.866	12.100	13.500	13.600	53.066	Q
17	Andreea Iridon	Romania	12.566	13.733	14.100	12.600	52.999	Q
20	Gabriela Janik	Poland	14.400	13.233	12.566	12.166	52.365	Q
26	Tutya Yılmaz	Turkey	13.866	11.333	13.700	12.633	51.532	Q
28	Vasiliki Millousi	Greece	13.233	12.933	13.600	11.700	51.466	Q
29	Ainhoa Carmona	Spain	13.900	12.366	12.833	12.233	51.332	Q
34	Marina Nekrasova	Azerbaijan	13.566	11.300	12.966	12.700	50.532	Q
35	Angelina Kysla	Ukraine	13.733	13.566	11.433	11.700	50.432	Q
37	Tzuf Feldon	Israel	13.000	12.133	12.966	12.200	50.299	Q
38	Barbora Mokošová	Slovakia	13.933	11.166	12.333	12.600	50.032	Q
39	Ana Đerek	Croatia	13.866	10.600	12.900	12.600	49.966	R1
40	Jasmin Mader	Austria	13.800	12.500	10.466	12.666	49.432	R2
41	Veronika Cenková	Czech Republic	12.600	11.366	12.800	12.166	48.932	R3
42	Valērija Grišāne	Latvia	13.500	10.266	12.433	12.600	48.799	R4

=== Vault ===
Rank	Gymnast	Nation	D Score	E Score	Pen.	Score 1	D Score	E Score	Pen.	Score 2	Total	Qual.
Rank	Gymnast	Nation	Vault 1				Vault 2				Total	Qual.
1	Giulia Steingruber	Switzerland	6.200	9.266		15.466	5.000	9.233		14.233	14.849	Q
2	Seda Tutkhalyan	Russia	5.800	9.166		14.966	5.600	8.666	0.3	13.966	14.466	Q
3	Lisa Top	Netherlands	5.300	8.833		14.133	5.000	9.000		14.000	14.066	Q
4	Gabriela Janik	Poland	5.300	9.100		14.400	4.600	8.900	0.1	13.400	13.900	Q
5	Kelly Simm	Great Britain	5.600	8.633		14.233	5.000	8.533		13.533	13.833	Q
6	Ana Đerek	Croatia	5.200	8.766	0.1	13.866	4.800	9.066		13.866	13.866	Q
7	Norma Róbertsdóttir	Iceland	5.300	8.866		14.166	4.800	8.666		13.466	13.816	R1
8	Tutya Yılmaz	Turkey	5.000	8.866		13.866	4.600	8.766		13.366	13.616	R2
9	Jasmin Mader	Austria	5.000	8.800		13.800	4.600	8.833		13.433	13.616	R3

=== Uneven bars ===
Rank	Gymnast	Nation	D Score	E Score	Pen.	Total	Qual.
1	Aliya Mustafina	Russia	6.500	8.700		15.200	Q
2	Sophie Scheder	Germany	6.500	8.500		15.000	Q
3	Elisabeth Seitz	Germany	6.600	8.400		15.000	
4	Victoria Komova	Russia	6.600	8.266		14.866	
5	Noémi Makra	Hungary	5.900	8.566		14.466	Q
6	Seda Tutkhalyan	Russia	5.800	8.366		14.166	
7	Céline van Gerner	Netherlands	5.300	8.600		13.900	Q
8	Tea Ugrin	Italy	5.900	7.866		13.766	Q
9	Andreea Iridon	Romania	5.600	8.133		13.733	Q
10	Charlie Fellows	Great Britain	5.800	7.800		13.700	R1
11	Lieke Wevers	Netherlands	5.800	7.800		13.600	
12	Lisa Top	Netherlands	5.100	8.466		13.566	
13	Angelina Kysla	Ukraine	5.700	7.866		13.566	R2
14	Valentine Pikul	France	5.700	7.733		13.433	R3

=== Balance beam ===
Rank	Gymnast	Nation	D Score	E Score	Pen.	Total	Qual.
1	Seda Tutkhalyan	Russia	6.300	8.300		14.600	Q
2	Aliya Mustafina	Russia	6.100	8.466		14.566	
3	Giulia Steingruber	Switzerland	6.000	8.400		14.400	Q
4	Victoria Komova	Russia	6.000	8.233		14.233	
5	Sophie Scheder	Germany	5.400	8.733		14.133	Q
6	Andreea Iridon	Romania	5.900	8.200		14.100	Q
7	Lieke Wevers	Netherlands	5.600	8.466		14.066	Q
8	Georgina Hockenhull	Great Britain	5.700	8.133		13.833	Q
9	Céline van Gerner	Netherlands	5.700	8.000		13.700	
10	Tutya Yılmaz	Turkey	6.100	7.600		13.700	R1
11	Anne Kuhm	France	5.500	8.166		13.666	R2
12	Marine Brevet	France	5.600	8.000		13.600	
13	Vasiliki Millousi	Greece	5.900	7.800	−0.100	13.600	R3

=== Floor exercise ===
Rank	Gymnast	Nation	D Score	E Score	Pen.	Total	Qual.
1	Aliya Mustafina	Russia	6.100	8.166	0.3	13.966	Q
2	Silvia Zarzu	Romania	5.700	8.233		13.933	Q
3	Lieke Wevers	Netherlands	5.400	8.500		13.900	Q
4	Laura Jurca	Romania	5.700	8.000		13.700	
5	Giulia Steingruber	Switzerland	6.000	7.733	0.1	13.633	Q
6	Lisa Verschueren	Belgium	5.400	8.200		13.600	Q
6	Valentine Pikul	France	5.400	8.200		13.600	Q
8	Gaelle Mys	Belgium	5.500	8.100		13.600	
9	Seda Tutkhalyan	Russia	5.700	7.900		13.600	
10	Kelly Simm	Great Britain	5.800	7.800		13.600	R1
11	Dorina Böczögő	Hungary	5.400	8.166		13.566	R2
12	Tea Ugrin	Italy	5.500	8.066		13.566	R3
