= Gymnastics at the 2015 European Games – Women's vault =

Women's vault at the 2015 European Games
- Venue: National Gymnastics Arena
- Dates: 20 June 2015
- Competitors: 6 from 6 nations

The Women's artistic gymnastics vault competition at the 2015 European Games was held in the National Gymnastics Arena, Baku on 20 June 2015.

== Medalists ==
Gold	Silver	Bronze
Switzerland; Giulia Steingruber	Russia; Seda Tutkhalyan	Netherlands; Lisa Top

== Qualification ==
The top six gymnasts with one per country advanced to the final.

Rank	Gymnast	D Score	E Score	Pen.	Score 1	D Score	E Score	Pen.	Score 2	Total	Qual.
Rank	Gymnast	Vault 1				Vault 2				Total	Qual.
1	Giulia Steingruber (SUI)	6.2	9.266		15.466	5.0	9.233		14.233	14.849	Q
2	Seda Tutkhalyan (RUS)	5.8	9.166		14.966	5.6	8.666	0.3	13.966	14.466	Q
3	Lisa Top (NED)	5.3	8.833		14.133	5.0	9.000		14.000	14.066	Q
4	Gabriela Janik (POL)	5.3	9.100		14.400	4.6	8.900	0.1	13.400	13.900	Q
5	Ana Derek (CRO)	5.2	8.766	0.1	13.866	4.8	9.066		13.866	13.866	Q
6	Kelly Simm (GBR)	5.6	8.633		14.233	5.0	8.533		13.533	13.833	Q
7	Norma Robertsdottir (ISL)	5.3	8.866		14.166	4.8	8.666		13.466	13.816	R1
8	Tutya Yilmaz (TUR)	5.0	8.866		13.866	4.6	8.766		13.366	13.616	R2
9	Jasmin Mader (AUT)	5.0	8.800		13.800	4.6	8.833		13.433	13.616	R3

== Results ==
Oldest and youngest competitors

	Name	Country	Date of birth	Age
Youngest	Seda Tutkhalyan	Russia	July 15, 1999	15 years, 11 months and 5 days
Oldest	Gabriela Janik	Poland	March 10, 1993	22 years, 3 months and 10 days

Rank	Gymnast	D Score	E Score	Pen.	Score 1	D Score	E Score	Pen.	Score 2	Total
Rank	Gymnast	Vault 1				Vault 2				Total
1st place, gold medalist(s)	Giulia Steingruber (SUI)	6.2	9.366		15.566	5.0	9.433		14.433	14.999
2nd place, silver medalist(s)	Seda Tutkhalyan (RUS)	5.8	9.033		14.833	5.6	8.933		14.533	14.683
3rd place, bronze medalist(s)	Lisa Top (NED)	5.3	8.833		14.133	5.0	8.900		13.900	14.016
4	Gabriela Janik (POL)	5.3	9.000		14.300	4.6	9.033		13.633	13.966
5	Ana Derek (CRO)	5.2	8.766		13.966	4.8	9.133		13.933	13.949
6	Kelly Simm (GBR)	5.6	8.733		14.333	0.0	0.000		0.000	7.166

- Kelly Simm scored a 0 on her second vault due to a landing on her hands and knees. She was going for the double-twisting Yurchenko, valued at 5.8.
