= Chantysha Netteb =

Dutch artistic gymnast

- Born: 8 June 1997 (age 29) Amsterdam, Netherlands

Gymnastics career
- Discipline: Women's artistic gymnastics
- Country represented: Netherlands
- Club: BATO Haarlem
- Retired: 2016

Chantysha Netteb (born 8 June 1997) is a Dutch former artistic gymnast.

== Career ==
Netteb competed at the 2012 European Junior Championships, and the Dutch team finished in 6th place. Individually, Netteb finished 22nd in the all-around final, and she won the gold medal on vault with a total score of 14.133. At the 2012 Dutch Junior Championships, she won gold medals in every event except for the floor exercise, where she won a silver medal behind Eythora Thorsdottir.

She finished 6th in the vault final at the 2013 FIG World Cup in Cottbus after falling on her yurchenko 1.5. Netteb competed at the 2013 European Championships. In the qualification round, she had a minor injury on her vault and decided to pull out of the other events. She qualified for the vault event final, and she decided to still compete because her leg felt better. She ended up finishing 6th. At the world cup in Osijek, she won the silver medal on vault behind her teammate Noël van Klaveren. She was selected to compete at the 2013 World Championships, and she qualified for the vault final in 8th place. During the vault event final, she tore her ACL on a double twisting yurchenko and finished last.

Netteb returned to competition at the 2015 Sidijk Tournament where she only competed on the uneven bars. She was supposed to compete again at the 2016 IAG SportEvent, but she reinjured her knee during warm-ups on the floor exercise. She then retired from competition.
