= 2016 Glasgow World Cup =

FIG World Cup event

- Venue: Emirates Arena
- Location: Glasgow, Scotland, United Kingdom
- Dates: 12 March 2016
- Competitors: 18 from 11 nations

The 2016 Glasgow World Cup is an FIG World Cup event that was held on 12 March 2016 at the Emirates Arena in Glasgow, Scotland.

== Participants ==
=== Women ===
- (Canada) Madison Copiak
- (United Kingdom) Claudia Fragapane
- (Italy) Enus Mariani
- (Germany) Elisabeth Seitz
- (United States) MyKayla Skinner
- (Japan) Asuka Teramoto
- (Netherlands) Vera Van Pol

=== Men ===
- (Switzerland) Christian Baumann
- (Russia) David Belyavskiy
- (China) Yu Cen
- (United States) Marvin Kimble
- (South Korea) Junho Lee
- (Brazil) Arthur Mariano (aka Nory)
- (United Kingdom) Daniel Purvis
- (United Kingdom) Max Whitlock
- (Japan) Masayoshi Yamamoto

== Results ==
=== Women's All-Around ===
Rank	Gymnast	Vault (gymnastics)	Uneven bars	Balance beam	Floor (gymnastics)	Total
1st place, gold medalist(s)	MyKayla Skinner (USA)	15.566	14.300	13.500	13.633	56.999
2nd place, silver medalist(s)	Elisabeth Seitz (GER)	13.933	14.800	13.766	13.233	55.732
3rd place, bronze medalist(s)	Claudia Fragapane (GBR)	14.466	12.500	14.066	14.366	55.398
4	Asuka Teramoto (JPN)	14.233	13.933	13.566	13.033	54.765
5	Enus Mariani (ITA)	13.933	13.666	13.400	13.433	54.432
6	Madison Copiak (CAN)	14.200	13.300	12.900	12.833	53.233
7	Vera Van Pol (NED)	13.833	12.700	12.366	12.566	51.465

=== Men's All-Around ===
Rank	Gymnast	Floor (gymnastics)	Pommel horse	Rings (gymnastics)	Vault (gymnastics)	Parallel bars	Horizontal bar	Total
1st place, gold medalist(s)	Max Whitlock (GBR)	15.033	15.500	14.333	15.133	14.500	14.800	89.299
2nd place, silver medalist(s)	Arthur Mariano (aka Nory) (BRA)	14.966	14.300	13.766	14.900	13.533	15.133	86.598
3rd place, bronze medalist(s)	Daniel Purvis (GBR)	14.566	13.200	14.400	14.633	15.166	14.500	86.465
4	Akash Modi (USA)	14.300	12.966	14.133	14.600	15.166	14.533	85.698
5	Masayoshi Yamamoto (JPN)	14.633	13.866	14.600	14.766	14.666	13.166	85.697
6	David Belyavskiy (RUS)	14.466	12.933	14.333	14.333	14.766	14.633	85.464
7	Christian Baumann (SUI)	13.866	13.800	14.533	14.333	15.000	12.500	84.032
8	Yu Cen (CHN)	14.433	12.500	14.733	15.366	14.300	12.600	83.932
9	Junho Lee (KOR)	13.966	12.833	13.500	14.033	13.600	12.500	80.432
