= Mara Titarsolej =

Dutch artistic gymnast

- Full name: Mara Zoe Titarsolej
- Born: 28 August 1999 (age 27) Arnhem, Netherlands
- Height: 5 ft 2 in (157 cm)

Gymnastics career
- Discipline: Women's artistic gymnastics
- Country represented: Netherlands
- College team: LIU Sharks (2021–2023); Missouri Tigers (2024–2025)
- Club: GTV de Hazenkamp
Medal record
Representing Missouri Tigers
NCAA Championships
Bronze medal – third place	2025 Fort Worth	Team
Bronze medal – third place	2025 Fort Worth	Uneven bars

Mara Zoe Titarsolej (born 28 August 1999) is a Dutch artistic gymnast. She competed at the 2015 World Championships, where she helped the Dutch team qualify for the 2016 Summer Olympics, marking the first time they qualified a team to the Olympics since 1976. She finished fifth on the floor exercise at the 2016 European Championships. After concluding her elite gymnastics career, she moved to the United States to compete in NCAA gymnastics. She is the 2024 and 2025 SEC conference champion on the uneven bars.

== Elite gymnastics career ==
Titarsolej was the 2012 Dutch national junior all-around champion. She competed at the 2013 European Youth Olympic Festival and finished ninth in the team competition alongside Eythora Thorsdottir and Dana de Groot. Individually, she finished eighth in the floor exercise final.

Titarsolej won the silver medal in the all-around at the 2015 Dutch Worlds Team Trials. As a result, she was selected to compete at the 2015 World Championships alongside Thorsdottir, Lisa Top, Tisha Volleman, Lieke Wevers, and Sanne Wevers. During the qualification round, the team beat out Brazil by less than half of a point for the eighth and final Olympic qualification spot. This marked the first time the Netherlands qualified as a team for the Olympic Games since 1976. The team once again finished eighth in the team final with Titarsolej contributing on the vault.

Titarsolej won an all-around silver medal at the 2016 IAG SportEvent behind Thorsdottir. She then competed at the 2016 European Championships and qualified for the floor exercise final, finishing fifth. Additionally, she was the third reserve for both the uneven bars and balance beam finals. She finished ninth in the all-around at the 2016 Dutch Championships. She was not selected for the Olympic team.

Titarsolej was not able to compete consistently following the 2016 season due to an ankle injury. She returned to international competitions after three years at the 2019 Züri-Oberland Cup, where she won the all-around. She then finished sixth in the all-around at the 2019 Dutch Championships. She was training for the 2020 Summer Olympics until her gym closed down during the COVID-19 pandemic, so she decided to end her elite career.

== Collegiate gymnastics career ==
=== 2021–2023: LIU ===
Titarsolej joined the LIU Sharks for their inaugural gymnastics season in 2021. She only competed in three meets during her freshman year due to an injury. On 6 March 2022, Titarsolej became the first LIU gymnast to receive a perfect 10 on any event for her uneven bars routine. She won the uneven bars title at the 2022 East Atlantic Gymnastics League (EAGL) Championships and was named the EAGL Specialist of the Year. She became the first LIU Gymnast to qualify for NCAA Regionals, where she finished fifth on the uneven bars. The next season, she was once again named the EAGL Specialist of the Year.

=== 2024–2025: Missouri ===
Titarsolej transferred to Missouri for her senior year. On 16 February 2024, Titarsolej became the first Missouri gymnast to ever receive a perfect 10 on the uneven bars. She helped Missouri place fifth at the 2024 SEC Championships and also became the SEC Co-champion on the uneven bars. Titarsolej qualified as an individual for the 2024 NCAA Championships on the uneven bars, but she only scored 9.6625. She announced before the end of the season that she would return for a fifth year.

At the 2025 SEC Championships, Titarsolej scored a perfect 10 on the uneven bars and tied with Leanne Wong and Riley McCusker as SEC co-champion on the event. At the 2025 NCAA Tournament, Titarsolej helped Missouri reach their program's first national final, where the team eventually finished in 3rd place.

=== Career Perfect 10.0 ===
Mara Titarsolej's Perfect 10 Scores
Season	Team	Date	Event	Meet
2022	LIU	March 6, 2022	Uneven bars	LIU vs North Carolina
2024	Missouri	February 16, 2024	Uneven bars	Mizzou to the Lou
2025	Missouri	March 22, 2025	Uneven bars	SEC Championships
