= Kirsten Polderman =

Dutch artistic gymnast

- Full name: Kirsten Johanna Polderman
- Born: 16 February 2000 (age 26) The Hague

Gymnastics career
- Discipline: Women's artistic gymnastics
- Country represented: Netherlands (2014-2019)
- Club: SV Pax Haarlemmermeer
- Head coaches: Patrick Kiens and Daymon Jones

Kirsten Johanna Polderman (born 16 February 2000) is a Dutch former artistic gymnast. She competed at the 2017 European Championships and the 2018 World Championships.

== Gymnastics career ==
=== Junior ===
Polderman won a silver medal in the junior all-around at the 2014 Dutch Championships behind Tisha Volleman, and she won a bronze medal on the uneven bars. She qualified for the all-around final at the 2015 European Youth Olympic Festival and finished 15th. At the 2015 Top Gym Tournament, she finished eleventh in the all-around, ninth on the vault and floor exercise, and fifth on the uneven bars and balance beam.

=== Senior ===
Polderman became age-eligible for senior competitions in 2016. She made her senior debut at the 2016 International Gymnix and tied with Laura Waem for fourth place on the uneven bars. She competed at the Dutch Olympic Qualifier but was not selected for the 2016 Olympic team. She competed at the 2017 European Championships but did not advance into any finals after finishing 25th in the all-around qualification round. She finished 23rd in the all-around at the 2017 Elite Gym Massilia.

Polderman won a silver medal with the Dutch team at the 2018 Varsenare Friendly. She was selected to compete at the 2018 World Championships in Doha, Qatar alongside Vera van Pol, Sanne Wevers, Naomi Visser, and Tisha Volleman. The team placed tenth in the qualification round and was the second reserve for the team final.

Polderman won a bronze medal with the Dutch team at the 2019 DTB Team Challenge. She was selected to compete at the 2019 Summer Universiade alongside Elze Geurts. However, while training for the FIT Challenge in Ghent, she tore her ACL. She has not competed since 2019.
