= Tisha Volleman =

Dutch artistic gymnast

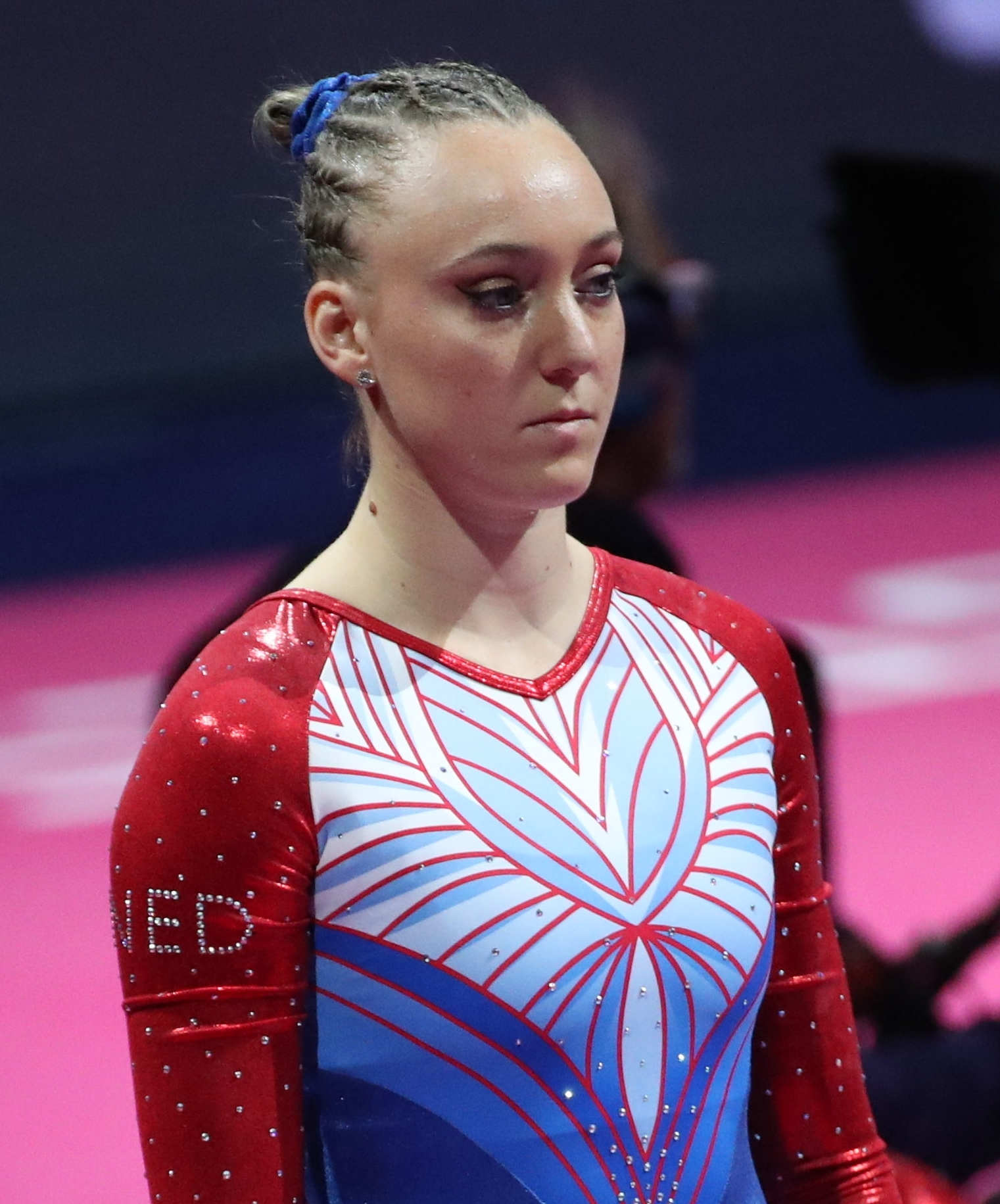
- Volleman at the 2022 European Championships

Personal information
- Full name: Tisha Manouk Gijs Volleman
- Nickname: Tis
- Born: 26 October 1999 (age 26) Eindhoven, Netherlands

Gymnastics career
- Discipline: Women's artistic gymnastics
- Country represented: Netherlands
- Club: Flik-Flak
- Head coach: Nico Zijp
Medal record
Representing Netherlands
European Championships
Bronze medal – third place	2018 Glasgow	Team
FIG World Cup
Event	1st	2nd	3rd
Apparatus World Cup	1	0	1
Total	1	0	1

Tisha Manouk Gijs Volleman (born 26 October 1999) is a Dutch artistic gymnast and a member of the national team. She won a bronze medal with the Dutch team at the 2018 European Championships. She represented the Netherlands at the 2024 Summer Olympics.

== Early life ==
Volleman was born on 26 October 1999 in Eindhoven. She began gymnastics when she was five years old, following her older sister into the sport. Her older brother, Tibo Volleman, has competed internationally in judo.

== Junior career ==
Volleman made her international debut at the 2013 Leverkusen Cup, finishing 16th in the all-around. She then competed at the 2014 Junior European Championships and helped the Dutch team finish ninth. She won the junior all-around title at the 2014 Dutch Championships. She also won a gold medal on the floor exercise and a silver medal on the uneven bars.

== Senior career ==
=== 2015 ===
Volleman became age-eligible for senior competitions in 2015. She competed at the Dutch Worlds Qualifications and finished fifth in the all-around. Then at a friendly meet against Great Britain, she finished seventh in the all-around. She competed at the World Championships in Glasgow alongside Eythora Thorsdottir, Mara Titarsolej, Lisa Top, and Sanne and Lieke Wevers. During the qualification round, the team beat out Brazil by less than half of a point for the eighth and final Olympic qualification spot. This marked the first time the Netherlands qualified as a team for the Olympic Games since 1976. The team once again finished eighth in the team final.

=== 2016 ===
Volleman placed eighth in the all-around at the 2016 AT&T American Cup, held in Newark, New Jersey. She then won the all-around bronze medal at the IAG SportEvent behind Eythora Thorsdottir and Mara Titarsolej. At the European Championships, she placed 12th in the all-around and did not advance to any event finals. She only finished 14th in the all-around at the Dutch Championships, but she won the silver medal in the vault final behind Vera van Pol. She then placed sixth in the all-around at the Dutch Olympic Qualifier. She was the alternate for the Netherlands at the 2016 Summer Olympics. After the Olympic Games, she competed at the Leverkusen Cup and won the all-around gold medal. She also won the all-around gold medal at the Turnkunst International.

=== 2017 ===
Volleman placed seventh in the all-around at the 2017 American Cup. She also placed seventh in the all-around at the London World Cup. At the European Championships, she qualified for the all-around final where she finished 11th. She also qualified for the vault final where she finished fifth, only 0.066 points away from the bronze medal. She then won a bronze medal in the all-around at the IAG SportEvent. Then at the Dutch Championships, she won her first senior national all-around title. Additionally, she won the vault, balance beam, and floor exercise titles. She then won gold medals on both the vault and floor exercise at the Dutch Invitational. She competed on the vault and floor exercise at the World Championships, but she did not advance into either event final.

=== 2018 ===
Volleman placed fourth in the all-around and eighth with the Dutch team at the DTB Pokal Team Challenge. Then at the Stuttgart World Cup, she finished sixth in the all-around. She withdrew from the Tokyo World Cup due to a minor injury sustained during podium training. She returned to competition in time for the Dutch Championships and won the all-around bronze medal behind Vera van Pol and Céline van Gerner. Additionally, she won the national titles on the vault and floor exercise. Then at the Heerenveen Friendly, she helped the Dutch team win the silver medal behind Japan, and she won the gold medal on the floor exercise.

Volleman contributed on the vault and floor exercise towards the Netherlands' bronze medal at the European Championships. Individually, she qualified for the vault final and finished seventh. In October, she helped the Dutch team finish second to Belgium at the Varsenare Friendly. She was named to the team to compete at the World Championships in Doha, Qatar, alongside Vera van Pol, Kirsten Polderman, Naomi Visser, and Sanne Wevers. The team placed tenth in the qualification round and was the second reserve for the team final. After the World Championships, she competed at the Joaquin Blume Memorial and finished fifth in the all-around.

=== 2019 ===
Volleman helped the Netherlands win team bronze at the DTB Team Challenge behind Brazil and Russia. She then won the all-around gold medal at the Unni & Haralds Trophy held in Oslo. She finished 13th in the all-around final at the European Championships after falling off the balance beam. She then won the all-around bronze medal at the IAG SportEvent. At the Dutch Championships, she did not compete in the all-around, but she won the vault bronze medal and the uneven bars silver medal.

Volleman competed with the Dutch team that finished second to Italy at the Heerenveen Friendly. Then at the 2nd Heerenveen Friendly, Volleman and the Dutch team beat Spain, Switzerland, and Hungary. She then competed at the World Championships in Stuttgart alongside Eythora Thorsdottir, Lieke Wevers, Sanne Wevers, and Naomi Visser. The team finished sixth during the qualification round and qualified a team spot for the 2020 Olympic Games, and then in the team final, they finished eighth. After the World Championships, she competed at the Cottbus World Cup and finished sixth on the floor exercise.

=== 2020-21 ===
In January 2020, it was announced that Volleman would compete at the Stuttgart World Cup taking place in March. The Stuttgart World Cup was canceled in March due to the COVID-19 pandemic. She returned to competition at the 2021 Heerenveen Friendly and finished fifth in the all-around. She competed on the uneven bars, balance beam, and floor exercise at the 2021 European Championships but did not advance to any finals. She attempted an original skill on the balance beam but fell and did not have her name added to the Code of Points.

Volleman placed fourth in the all-around at the 1st Dutch Olympic Trials and fifth at the 2nd Dutch Olympic Trials. She was not selected to compete at the 2020 Olympic Games. In November, she competed at the Gymnova Cup and won gold in the all-around and on floor exercise, silver on balance beam, and bronze on uneven bars.

=== 2022 ===
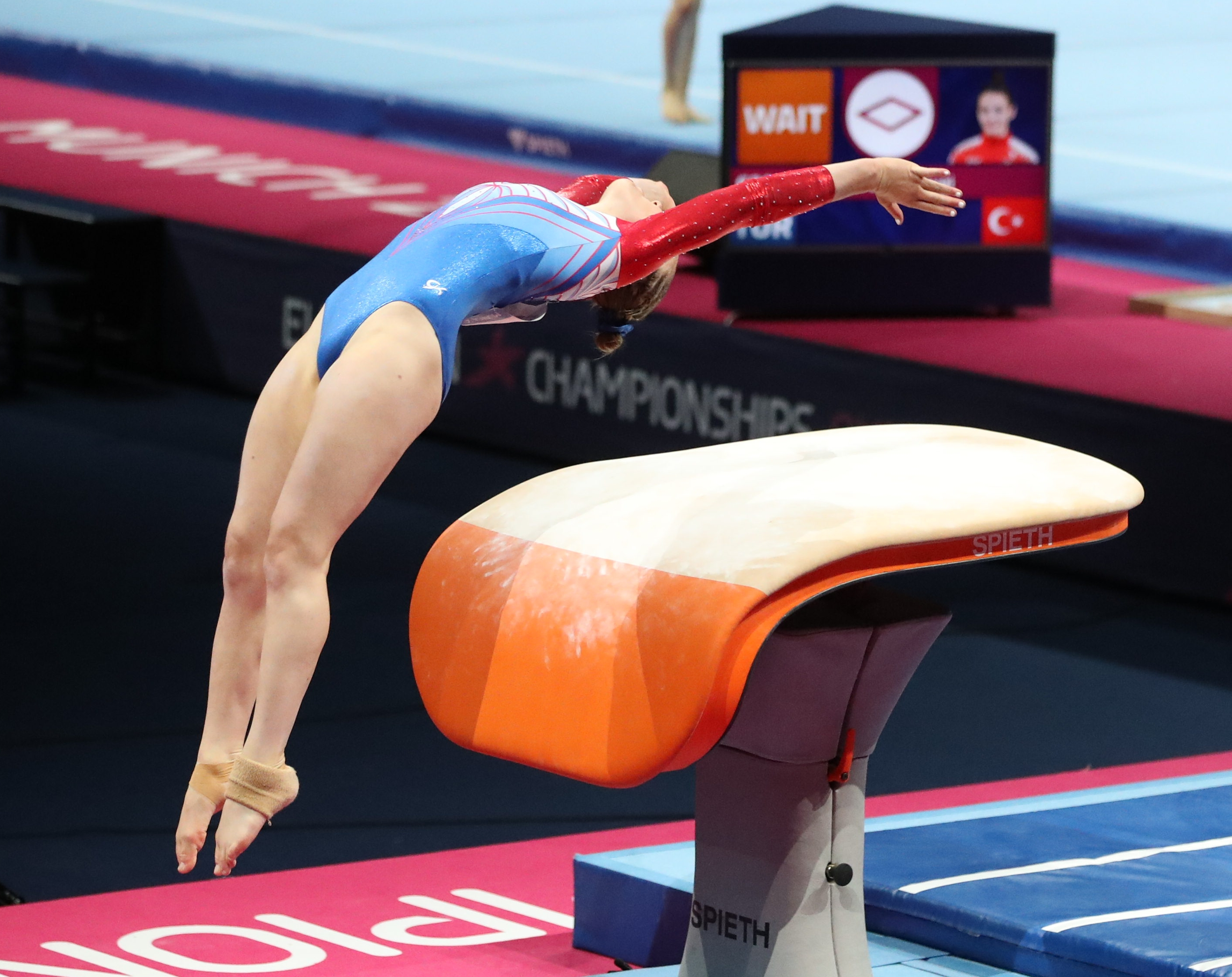
Volleman vaulting at the 2022 European Championships

At the 2022 Cottbus World Cup, Volleman won the gold medal on the uneven bars and took the bronze on floor exercise. She then helped the Dutch team place fifth at the DTB Pokal Team Challenge. Then at the Dutch Championships, she won the all-around silver medal behind Naomi Visser. She won another silver medal on the balance beam and a bronze medal on the floor exercise. At the 2022 European Championships in Munich, Volleman helped the Netherlands qualify for the team final, where they finished fourth behind Italy, Great Britain and Germany.

Volleman finished second to Eythora Thorsdottir at the Dutch Worlds Trials. She was selected to compete at the World Championships in Liverpool alongside Thorsdottir, Eve de Ruiter, Sanna Veerman, and Naomi Visser. The team placed ninth in the qualification round, making them the first reserve for the final. Individually, Volleman advanced to the all-around final and placed 16th. After the World Championships, she won the all-around at the Gymnova Cup for the second year in a row. She also won gold on the uneven bars and bronze on the floor exercise.

=== 2023 ===
Volleman was initially the first reserve for the uneven bars final at the 2023 Cottbus World Cup, but after Elisa Iorio withdrew, Volleman competed and won the bronze medal. At the DTB Pokal Team Challenge, the Dutch team placed fourth, and Volleman finished fifth in the floor exercise final. Then at the Dutch Championships, she won silver medals on the uneven bars and floor exercise, both behind Naomi Visser. She then competed at the World University Games and finished fourth in the floor exercise final and sixth in the all-around and balance beam finals. She was the team alternate for the World Championships. She finished fourth all-around at the Gymnova Cup, behind three Canadian gymnasts.

=== 2024 ===
Volleman competed with the Dutch team that placed seventh at the European Championships. She won a bronze medal on the uneven bars at the Dutch Championships. She then placed sixth in the all-around at the Dutch Olympic Trials. She was selected as the Netherlands' alternate for the 2024 Olympic Games. However, Vera van Pol withdrew due to a foot injury, and Volleman was added to the team.

== Competitive history ==
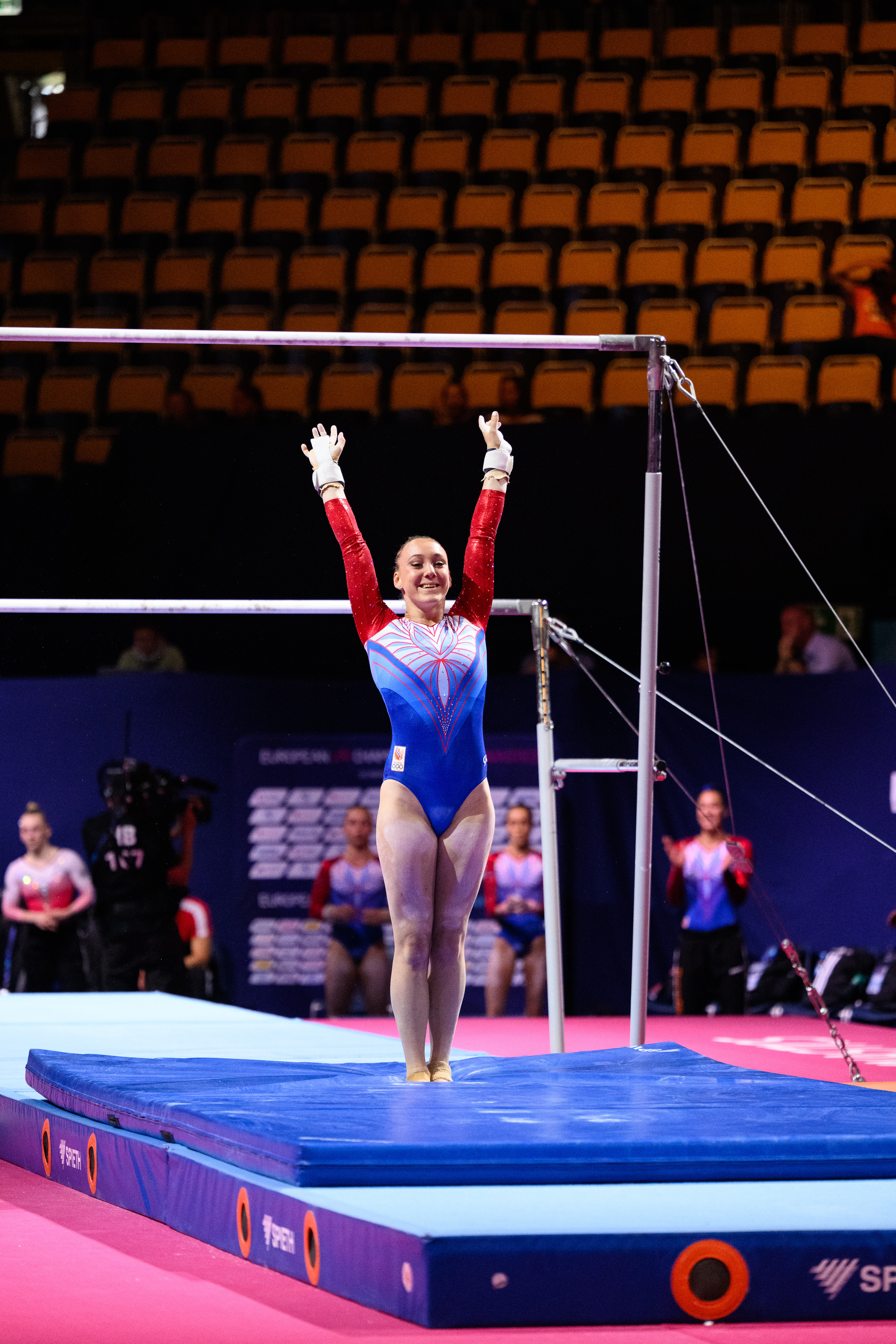
Volleman at the 2022 European Championships

Competitive history of Tisha Volleman at the junior level
Year	Event	Team	AA	VT	UB	BB	FX
2013	Leverkusen Cup	5	16				
2014
2014	Junior European Championships	9					
2014	Dutch Championships		1st place, gold medalist(s)		2nd place, silver medalist(s)		1st place, gold medalist(s)

Competitive history of Tisha Volleman at the senior level
Year	Event	Team	AA	VT	UB	BB	FX
2015	Dutch Worlds Qualifications		5				
2015	Netherlands-Great Britain Friendly	2nd place, silver medalist(s)	7				
2015	World Championships	8					
2016	American Cup		8				
2016	IAG SportEvent		3rd place, bronze medalist(s)				
2016	European Championships		12				
2016	Dutch Championships		14	2nd place, silver medalist(s)	6	10	
2016	Dutch Olympic Qualifier		6				
2016	Leverkusen Cup	4	1st place, gold medalist(s)				
2016	Turnkunst International		1st place, gold medalist(s)				
2017	American Cup		7				
2017	London World Cup		7				
2017	European Championships		11	5			
2017	IAG SportEvent		3rd place, bronze medalist(s)				
2017	Dutch Championships		1st place, gold medalist(s)	1st place, gold medalist(s)		1st place, gold medalist(s)	1st place, gold medalist(s)
2017	Dutch Invitational			1st place, gold medalist(s)			1st place, gold medalist(s)
2017	World Championships			R1			
2018	DTB Pokal Team Challenge	8	4				
2018	Stuttgart World Cup		6				
2018	Dutch Championships		3rd place, bronze medalist(s)	1st place, gold medalist(s)	6		1st place, gold medalist(s)
2018	Heerenveen Friendly	2nd place, silver medalist(s)	12			4	1st place, gold medalist(s)
2018	European Championships	3rd place, bronze medalist(s)		7			
2018	Varsenare Friendly	2nd place, silver medalist(s)	6				
2018	World Championships	R2					
2018	Joaquin Blume Memorial		5				
2019	DTB Pokal Team Challenge	3rd place, bronze medalist(s)	11				
2019	Unni & Haralds Trophy		1st place, gold medalist(s)				
2019	European Championships		13				
2019	IAG SportEvent		3rd place, bronze medalist(s)				
2019	Dutch Championships			3rd place, bronze medalist(s)	2nd place, silver medalist(s)		6
2019	Heerenveen Friendly	2nd place, silver medalist(s)	10				
2019	2nd Heerenveen Friendly	1st place, gold medalist(s)	6				
2019	World Championships	8					
2019	Cottbus World Cup						6
2021	Heerenveen Friendly		5				
2021	European Championships				42	44	22
2021	1st Dutch Olympic Trials		4				
2021	2nd Dutch Olympic Trials		5				
2021	Gymnova Cup		1st place, gold medalist(s)		3rd place, bronze medalist(s)	2nd place, silver medalist(s)	1st place, gold medalist(s)
2022	Cottbus World Cup				1st place, gold medalist(s)		3rd place, bronze medalist(s)
2022	DTB Pokal Team Challenge	5	13				
2022	Dutch Championships		2nd place, silver medalist(s)		6	2nd place, silver medalist(s)	3rd place, bronze medalist(s)
2022	European Championships	4					
2022	Dutch Worlds Trials		2nd place, silver medalist(s)				
2022	World Championships	R1	16				
2022	Gymnova Cup	6	1st place, gold medalist(s)		1st place, gold medalist(s)	6	3rd place, bronze medalist(s)
2023	Cottbus World Cup				3rd place, bronze medalist(s)		6
2023	DTB Pokal Team Challenge	4	9				5
2023	Dutch Championships		4		2nd place, silver medalist(s)	5	2nd place, silver medalist(s)
2023	World University Games		6		6		4
2023	Gymnova Cup		4		4	4	
2024
2024	European Championships	7					
2024	Dutch Championships		7		3rd place, bronze medalist(s)		
2024	Dutch Olympic Trials		6				
2024	Olympic Games	9					
2025
2025	European Championships	5					
