= Vera van Pol =

Dutch artistic gymnast

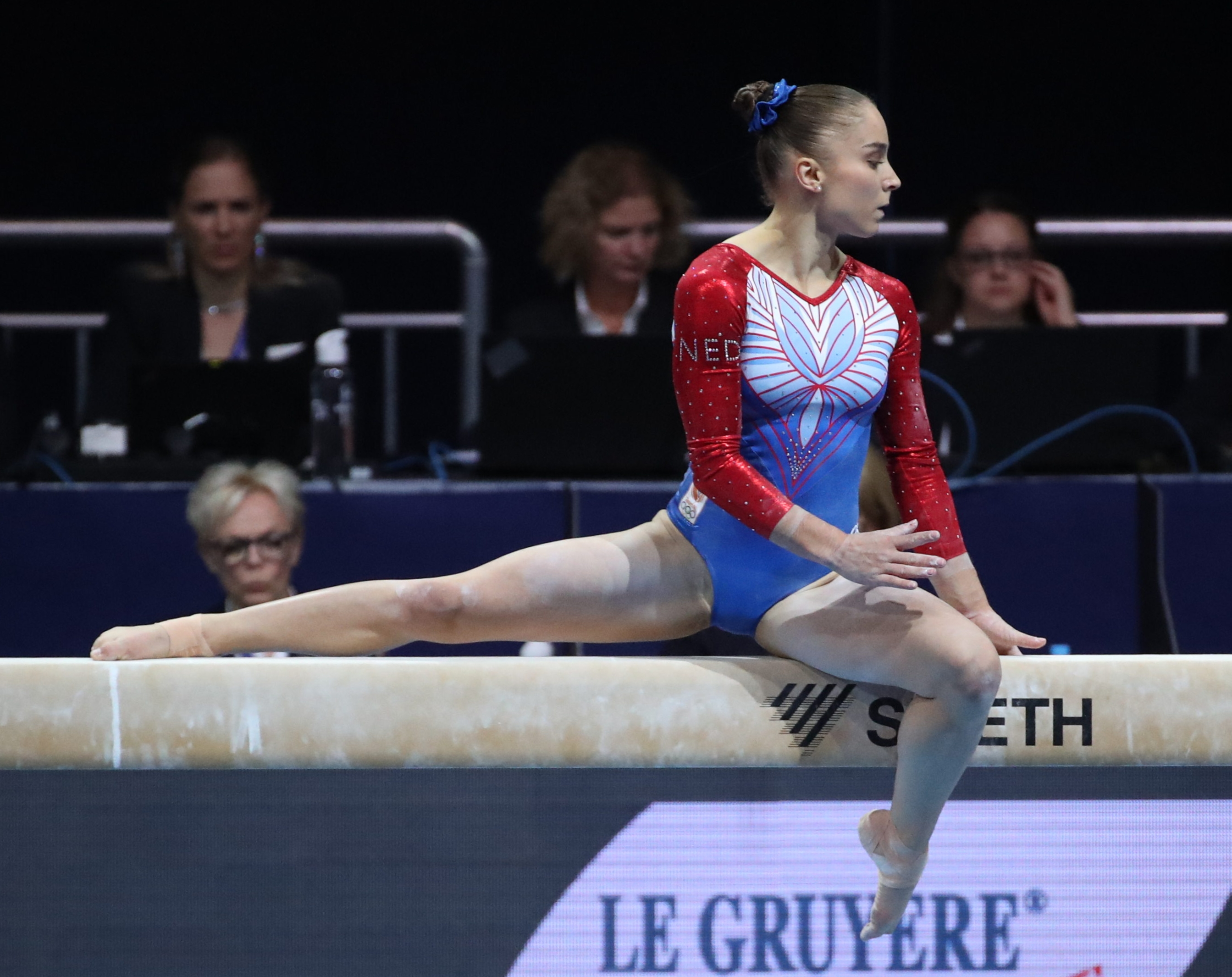
- van Pol at the 2022 European Championships

Personal information
- Full name: Vera Dorothea Wilhelmina van Pol
- Born: 17 December 1993 (age 32) Weert, Netherlands
- Height: 1.57 m (5 ft 2 in)

Gymnastics career
- Discipline: Women's artistic gymnastics
- Country represented: Netherlands; (2013–present)
- Club: Turnz Amsterdam
- Head coach: Gerben Wiersma
Medal record
Representing Netherlands
European Championships
Bronze medal – third place	2018 Glasgow	Team
Bronze medal – third place	2023 Antalya	Team
FIG World Cup
Event / 1st / 2nd / 3rd; Apparatus World Cup / 0 / 0 / 1

Vera Dorothea Wilhelmina van Pol (born 17 December 1993) is a Dutch artistic gymnast. She represented the Netherlands at the 2016 and 2020 Summer Olympics. She won a bronze medal with the Dutch team at the 2018 European Championships. She is the 2015 and 2018 Dutch all-around champion. She competed at the 2013, 2014, 2018, and 2021 World Championships.

== Career ==
=== 2013-2014 ===
Van Pol competed at the 2013 Hungarian Grand Prix in Szombathely, finishing fourth on both the uneven bars and the balance beam. She was then selected to compete at the 2013 World Championships in Antwerp. She competed on the uneven bars and the floor exercise but did not make either event final.

Van Pol was selected to compete at the 2014 European Championships alongside Julia Bombach, Lisa Top, Lieke Wevers, and Sanne Wevers. The team finished ninth making them the first reserve for the team final. She then competed at the 2014 Dutch Championships and won the all-around bronze medal behind Lisa Top and Maartje Ruikes. She became the national champion on the uneven bars, and she also won silver on vault and floor exercise. She then helped the Netherlands win a friendly meet against France and Austria, and she also placed fourth in the all-round with a total score of 51.400. She was then selected to compete at the 2014 World Championships in Nanning alongside Maartje Ruikes, Lisa Top, Céline van Gerner, Lieke Wevers, and Sanne Wevers. The team placed tenth in the qualification round making them the second reserve for the team final.

=== 2015-2016 ===
Van Pol won the all-around, vault, and floor exercise titles at the 2015 Dutch Championships and won the silver medal on the balance beam behind Sanne Wevers. At the FIT Challenge in Ghent, the Dutch team finished seventh and van Pol placed twenty-fourth in the all-around. She then competed at a friendly meet against Great Britain and placed eighth all-around. Her final competition of the year was the 2015 Voronin Cup in Moscow where she placed fourth in the team, all-around, uneven bars, balance beam, and floor exercise.

Van Pol began her 2016 season at the Sidijk Tournament in Heerenveen where she finished third on the balance beam behind Emma Larsson and Céline van Gerner. Then in March, she competed at the Glasgow World Cup finishing seventh in the all-around with a total score of 51.465. The next week she traveled to Stuttgart to compete in the DTB Team Challenge and competed on the uneven bars and balance beam to help the Dutch team place seventh. Her next competition was the IAG SportEvent, a domestic event held in 's-Hertogenbosch. She placed fourth in the all-around with a total score of 53.498 and had the second-highest score on the vault and uneven bars, both behind Eythora Thorsdottir. Then at the Dutch Championships, she won the gold medal on vault and placed eleventh all-around and on balance beam and ninth on uneven bars. Then in July at the Dutch Olympic Qualifier, she finished fifth in the all-around. She was selected to represent the Netherlands at the 2016 Summer Olympics alongside Eythora Thorsdottir, Céline van Gerner, Lieke Wevers, and Sanne Wevers. In the qualification round, van Pol competed on the vault and floor exercise, scoring a 14.266 and a 13.500 respectively, and helping the Netherlands qualify for the team final in eighth place. She scored a 14.100 on vault during the team final where the Netherlands finished seventh.

=== 2017-2018 ===
Van Pol returned to competition at the 2017 Summer Universiade in Taipei and helped the Dutch team place fifth in the team competition. Individually, she finished fifteenth in the all-around final. Her only other competition of 2017 was the Elite Gym Massilia where she placed fifth in the all-around and on the uneven bars and fourth with the Dutch team.

In March 2018, van Pol competed at the Birmingham World Cup, finishing sixth all-around with a score of 51.032. She then won her second national all-around title at the Dutch Championships where she also won bronze medals on the balance beam and floor exercise. Then at the Heerenveen Friendly, she helped the Dutch team win the silver medal behind Japan, and she placed eleventh all-around, fifth on uneven bars, and fourth on floor exercise. She was selected to compete for the Netherlands at the 2018 European Championships alongside Céline van Gerner, Tisha Volleman, Sanne Wevers, and Naomi Visser. They won the team bronze medal behind Russia and France, marking the first time the Netherlands won a team medal at the European Women's Artistic Gymnastics Championships since 2002. Then at the Varsenare Friendly, she helped the Dutch team win the silver medal behind Belgium. She was selected to compete at the World Championships in Doha alongside Kirsten Polderman, Naomi Visser, Tisha Volleman, and Sanne Wevers. The team placed tenth in the qualification round and was the second reserve for the team final.

=== 2019-2021 ===
Van Pol had ankle surgery in February 2019 and missed the beginning of the season. She returned to competition at the Heerenveen Friendly in August where the Dutch team finished second behind Italy, and van Pol placed ninth in the all-around. Then in September at the 2nd Heerenveen Friendly, she placed eleventh all-around and helped the Netherlands win the team gold medal.

Van Pol was initially scheduled to compete at the 2020 Birmingham World Cup. However, the event was postponed and eventually cancelled due to the COVID-19 pandemic in the United Kingdom.

Van Pol returned to competition in April 2021 at the Heerenveen Friendly where she placed eighth in the all-around. Then at the Varna Challenge Cup, she placed eighth on the uneven bars. At the 1st Dutch Olympic Trials, she placed sixth all-around and had the second-highest scores on the vault and the uneven bars. She then won the all-around gold medal at the 2nd Dutch Olympic Trials and was selected to represent the Netherlands at the 2020 Summer Olympics alongside Eythora Thorsdottir, Lieke Wevers, and Sanne Wevers. The team finished eleventh in the qualification round and did not advance into the team finals. After the Olympics, van Pol competed at the 2021 World Championships and was the fourth reserve for the all-around final after finishing twenty-eighth in the qualification round.

=== 2022 ===
Van Pol won her first FIG World Cup medal at the 2022 Baku World Cup with a bronze on the uneven bars behind Lorette Charpy and Naomi Visser.

At the European Championships in Munich, van Pol helped the Netherlands qualify to the team final, where they finished fourth behind Italy, Great Britain and Germany.

== Competitive history ==
Year	Event	Team	AA	VT	UB	BB	FX
2013	Hungarian Grand Prix				4	4	
2014
2014	European Championships	R1					
2014	Dutch Championships		3rd place, bronze medalist(s)	2nd place, silver medalist(s)	1st place, gold medalist(s)	2nd place, silver medalist(s)	
2014	Rencontre Internationale	1st place, gold medalist(s)	4				
2014	World Championships	R2					
2015	Dutch Championships		1st place, gold medalist(s)	1st place, gold medalist(s)		2nd place, silver medalist(s)	1st place, gold medalist(s)
2015	FIT Challenge	7	24				
2015	NED-GBR Friendly	2nd place, silver medalist(s)	8				
2015	Voronin Cup	4	4		4	4	4
2016	Sidijk Tournament					3rd place, bronze medalist(s)	
2016	Glasgow World Cup		7				
2016	DTB Team Challenge	7					
2016	IAG SportEvent		4				
2016	Dutch Championships		11	1st place, gold medalist(s)	9	11	
2016	Dutch Olympic Qualifier		5				
2016	Olympic Games	7					
2017	Summer Universiade	5	15				
2017	Elite Gym Massilia	4	5		5		
2018	Birmingham World Cup		6				
2018	Dutch Championships		1st place, gold medalist(s)		4	3rd place, bronze medalist(s)	3rd place, bronze medalist(s)
2018	Heerenveen Friendly	2nd place, silver medalist(s)	11		5		4
2018	European Championships	3rd place, bronze medalist(s)					
2018	Varsenare Friendly	2nd place, silver medalist(s)					
2018	World Championships	R2					
2019	Heerenveen Friendly	2nd place, silver medalist(s)	9				
2019	2nd Heerenveen Friendly	1st place, gold medalist(s)	11				
2021	Heerenveen Friendly		8				
2021	Varna Challenge Cup				8		
2021	1st Dutch Olympic Trials		6				
2021	2nd Dutch Olympic Trials		1st place, gold medalist(s)				
2021	Olympic Games	11					
2021	World Championships		R4				
2022	Baku World Cup				3rd place, bronze medalist(s)		
2022	European Championships	4	16				
2023
2023	European Championships	3rd place, bronze medalist(s)					
2023	World Championships	7					
2026
2026	World Championships	11					
