= Eythora Thorsdottir =

Dutch artistic gymnast

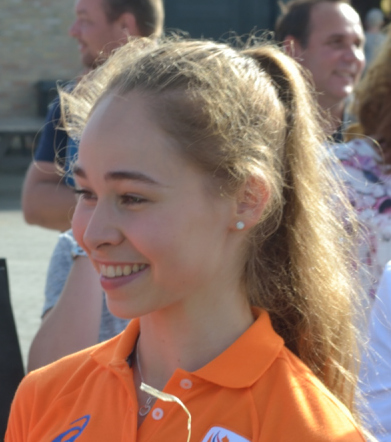
- Eythora in 2016

Personal information
- Full name: Eythora Elisabet Thorsdottir
- Born: 10 August 1998 (age 28) Rotterdam, Netherlands
- Height: 1.60 m (5 ft 3 in)

Gymnastics career
- Discipline: Women's artistic gymnastics
- Country represented: Netherlands; (2012–present)
- Club: SV Pax - Haarlemmermeer
- Head coach: Patrick Kiens
Medal record
Representing Netherlands
European Championships
Silver medal – second place	2017 Cluj-Napoca	Balance beam
Silver medal – second place	2019 Szczecin	Floor exercise
Bronze medal – third place	2017 Cluj-Napoca	Floor exercise
Bronze medal – third place	2023 Antalya	Team
FIG World Cup
Event	1st	2nd	3rd
Apparatus World Cup	1	0	0
World Challenge Cup	1	0	0
Total	2	0	0

Eythora Elisabet Thorsdottir (Icelandic: Eyþóra Elísabet Þórsdóttir; born 10 August 1998) is a Dutch artistic gymnast. She competed at the 2016 Summer Olympics where she finished ninth in the individual all-around. At the 2017 European Championships, she won a silver medal on balance beam and a bronze medal on floor exercise. She is also the 2019 European floor exercise silver medalist and the 2023 European bronze medalist with the Dutch team.

== Early life ==
Eythora was born in Rotterdam on 10 August 1998. Her parents moved from Iceland to the Netherlands for work, and Eythora is a dual citizen. She began gymnastics when she was six years old.

== Junior career ==
Eythora made her international debut at the 2012 Austrian Team Open and helped the Dutch team win the silver medal behind Austria. She then competed at the 2012 European Championships in Brussels and placed tenth in the all-around with a score of 52.731, eighth on balance beam with an 11.166, and sixth with the Dutch team with a total combined score of 157.361. Later in the year, she competed at the Dutch Championships in Rotterdam and placed second in the all-around and on beam and first on the floor.

Eythora competed at the 2013 European Youth Summer Olympic Festival along with teammates Mara Titarsolej and Dana de Groot. They placed ninth as a team, and individually, she placed ninth in the all-around and won the silver medal on the beam behind Russia's Maria Bondareva.

== Senior career ==
=== 2014 ===
Eythora missed most of the season due to a back injury. In November, she competed at the Élite Gym Massilia and finished fourth in the open all-around competition. Then at the Dutch Team Championships, she helped SV Pax Haarlemmermeer win the bronze medal.

=== 2015 ===
Eythora began the season by winning the gold medal in the all-around at the Sidijk Tournament in Heerenveen. In preparation for the European Championships, she competed at the Ljubljana World Challenge Cup, placing first on the floor. At the European Championships, she placed twelfth in the all-around final. She competed at the friendly meet against Great Britain, and the Dutch team lost to the British.

Eythora competed at the World Championships in Glasgow alongside Mara Titarsolej, Lisa Top, Tisha Volleman, Lieke Wevers, and Sanne Wevers. The team qualified for the 2016 Olympics by finishing eighth in the team competition marking the first time the Netherlands qualified a full team since 1976. During the qualifications, she placed 28th in the all-around and was the first reserve for the final. She qualified for the balance beam event final, but she fell in the final and placed eighth.

=== 2016 ===
Eythora started off the season at the International Gymnix in Canada, winning bronze on the balance beam and placing fourth on floor exercise. She then competed at the IAG SportEvent in 's-Hertogenbosch, winning every event except balance beam, where she placed fifth. She became Dutch all-around champion in late June.

Eythora represented the Netherlands at the 2016 Summer Olympics in Rio de Janeiro, where she helped the Dutch team qualify for the team final. They finished in seventh place. She also qualified for the individual all-around final where she finished in ninth place with a score of 57.632. In November, she won silver in the all-around behind Angelina Melnikova at the Arthur Gander Memorial in Spain. She then competed at the Swiss Cup and finished ninth with teammate Bart Deurloo. She helped her club win the Dutch Team Championships. She ended the season by joining the Stuttgart Club as a guest to help them win the Bundesliga Final.

=== 2017 ===
Eythora returned to competition at the Reykjavik International Games, winning all-around and balance beam gold, vault and floor exercise silver, and uneven bars bronze. She then finished fifth in the all-around at the Stuttgart World Cup. In April, she competed at the European Championships and finished twelfth in the all-around final. In the balance beam final, Eythora won the silver medal behind Cătălina Ponor. In the floor exercise final, she finished in third place behind Angelina Melnikova and Ellie Downie. She then finished fifth in the all-around at the Dutch International, and she tied for the silver medal in the balance beam final with Spain's Ana Pérez. Thorsdottir competed at the World Championships but did not qualify for any finals.

=== 2018 ===
Eythora competed at the Heerenveen Friendly where the Netherlands placed second in the team final. She was added to the team to compete at the 2018 European Championships, but she had to withdraw after she broke her hand. Additionally, she could not compete at the World Championships because of the same injury.

Eythora returned to competition at the Arthur Gander Memorial in Chiasso, Switzerland in mid-November. She won bronze in the 3-event all-around behind Jade Barbosa and Flavia Saraiva of Brazil. Then at the Swiss Cup, she competed with Bart Deurloo, and they finished eighth.

=== 2019 ===
In March, Eythora competed at the DTB Team Challenge in Stuttgart where she helped the Netherlands place third in the team final. Individually, she also won bronze in the all-around. Then in April, she competed at the European Championships where she placed thirteenth in the all-around but won silver on floor exercise, finishing behind Mélanie de Jesus dos Santos of France.

In August, Eythora competed at the Heerenveen Friendly where she helped the Netherlands win silver in the team competition behind Italy, and individually, she finished second in the all-around behind Italian Giorgia Villa. The following month she competed at the Second Heerenveen Friendly where she helped the Netherlands finish first. Individually, she placed third in the all-around behind compatriot Naomi Visser and Giulia Steingruber of Switzerland. She then competed at the World Championships in Stuttgart alongside Naomi Visser, Tisha Volleman, Lieke Wevers, and Sanne Wevers. The team finished eighth in the team final and qualified as a full team for the 2020 Olympic Games.

=== 2021 ===
Eythora represented the Netherlands at the 2020 Summer Olympics in Tokyo, along with Vera van Pol, and Lieke and Sanne Wevers. The Dutch team finished eleventh in qualifications. Eythora received an all-around score of 52.899 and was the second reserve for the all-around final.

=== 2022 ===
Eythora finished fifth in the floor exercise final at the Dutch Championships. Then at the World Championships, she competed with the Dutch team that finished ninth in the qualification round. After the World Championships, she finished fourth in the all-around at the Arthur Gander Memorial. Then at the Swiss Cup, she finished sixth with teammate Casimir Schmidt.

=== 2023 ===
Eythora made her season debut at the Baku World Cup where she finished sixth on the uneven bars. She then competed at the European Championships alongside Vera van Pol, Sanna Veerman, Naomi Visser, and Sanne Wevers, and they won the team bronze medal.

== Competitive history ==
Competitive history of Eythora Thorsdottir
Year	Event	Team	AA	VT	UB	BB	FX
2012	Austrian Team Open	2nd place, silver medalist(s)	6				
2012	Junior European Championships	6	10			8	
2012	Dutch Championships		2nd place, silver medalist(s)		2nd place, silver medalist(s)	6	1st place, gold medalist(s)
2013	European Youth Olympic Festival	9	9			2nd place, silver medalist(s)	
2014	Élite Gym Massilia	5	4				7
2014	Dutch Team Championships	3rd place, bronze medalist(s)					
2015	Sidijk Tournament		1st place, gold medalist(s)				
2015	Ljubljana World Challenge Cup					7	1st place, gold medalist(s)
2015	European Championships		12				
2015	NED-GBR Friendly	2nd place, silver medalist(s)	5				
2015	World Championships	8	R1			8	
2016	International Gymnix		14			3rd place, bronze medalist(s)	4
2016	IAG SportEvent		1st place, gold medalist(s)	1st place, gold medalist(s)	1st place, gold medalist(s)	5	1st place, gold medalist(s)
2016	Dutch Championships		1st place, gold medalist(s)				
2016	Olympic Games	7	9				
2016	Arthur Gander Memorial		2nd place, silver medalist(s)				
2016	Swiss Cup	9					
2016	Dutch Team Championships	1st place, gold medalist(s)					
2016	Bundesliga Final	1st place, gold medalist(s)					
2017	Reykjavik International Games		1st place, gold medalist(s)	2nd place, silver medalist(s)	3rd place, bronze medalist(s)	1st place, gold medalist(s)	2nd place, silver medalist(s)
2017	Stuttgart World Cup		5				
2017	European Championships		12			2nd place, silver medalist(s)	3rd place, bronze medalist(s)
2017	Dutch International		5		5	2nd place, silver medalist(s)	4
2018	Heerenveen Friendly	2nd place, silver medalist(s)	7				
2018	Arthur Gander Memorial		3rd place, bronze medalist(s)				
2018	Swiss Cup	8					
2019	DTB Team Cup	3rd place, bronze medalist(s)	3rd place, bronze medalist(s)				
2019	European Championships		13				2nd place, silver medalist(s)
2019	Heerenveen Friendly	2nd place, silver medalist(s)	2nd place, silver medalist(s)				
2019	Second Heerenveen Friendly	1st place, gold medalist(s)	3rd place, bronze medalist(s)				
2019	World Championships	8					
2021
2021	Olympic Games	11	R2				
2022	Dutch Championships						5
2022	World Championships	R1					
2022	Arthur Gander Memorial		4				
2022	Swiss Cup	6					
2023	Baku World Cup				6		
2023	European Championships	3rd place, bronze medalist(s)	6				
2023	World Championships	7	6				
2024	Cairo World Cup					6	
2025	Osijek World Cup					1st place, gold medalist(s)	6
