= 2016 Dutch Artistic Gymnastics Championships =

The 2016 Dutch Artistic Gymnastics Championships took place in Rotterdam, Netherlands, from 25 to 26 June, and it hosted gymnasts from the Netherlands as well as international competitors.

== Medalists ==
Event	Gold	Silver	Bronze
Seniors
All-Around	Eythora Thorsdottir (NED)	Céline van Gerner (NED)	Axelle Klinckaert (BEL)
Vault	Vera van Pol (NED)	Tisha Volleman (NED)	Esmee Parinussa (NED)
Uneven Bars	Laura Waem (BEL)	Nina Derwael (BEL)	Senna Deriks (BEL)
Balance Beam	Sanne Wevers (NED)	Reina Beltman (NED)	Rune Hermans (BEL)
Floor	Axelle Klinckaert (BEL)	Gaelle Mys (BEL)	Rune Hermans (BEL)
