= Noël van Klaveren =

Dutch artistic gymnast

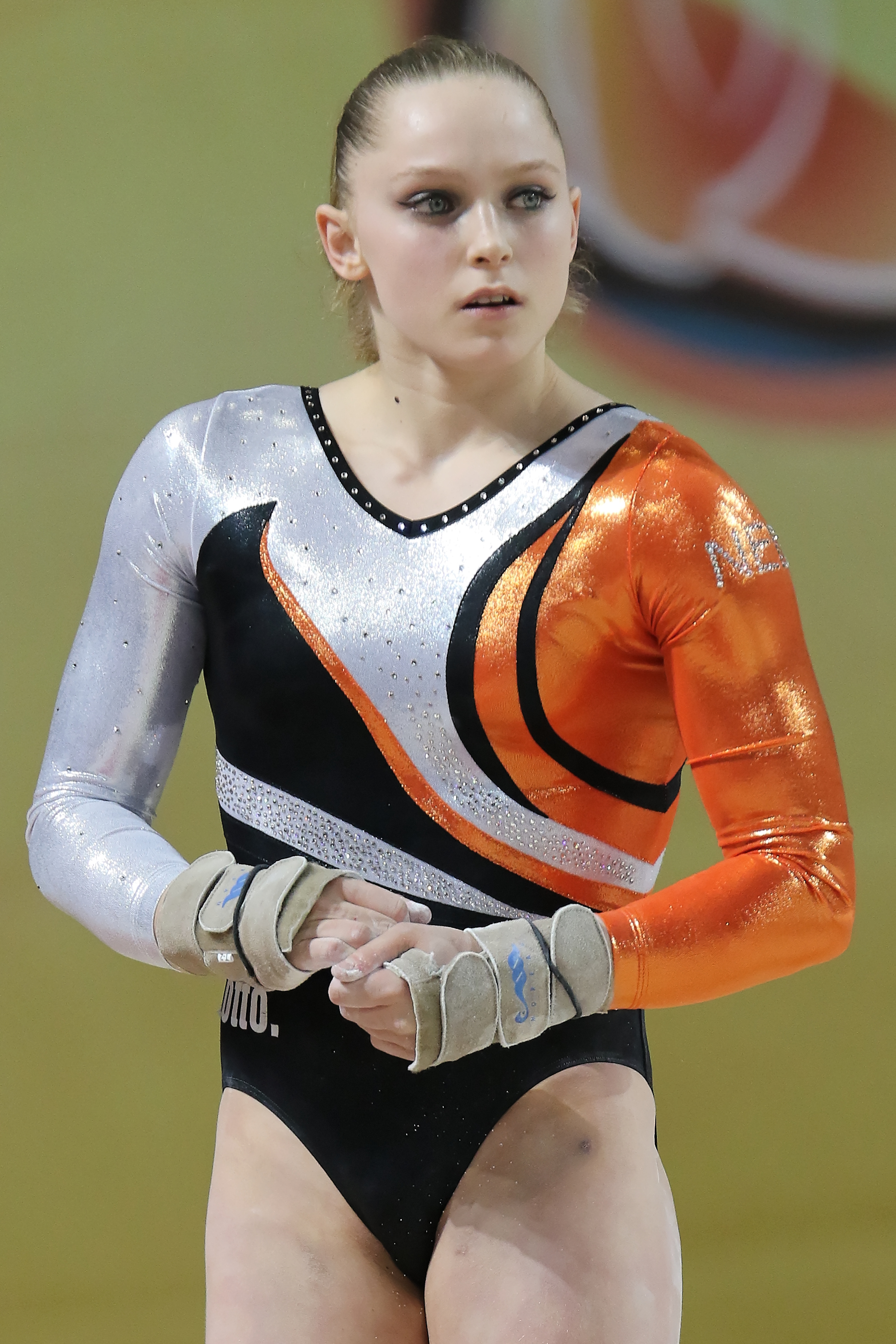
- Noël van Klaveren at the 2015 European Championships

Personal information
- Born: 27 November 1995 (age 30) Alphen aan den Rijn
- Height: 157 cm (5 ft 2 in)

Gymnastics career
- Discipline: Women's artistic gymnastics
- Country represented: Netherlands (2012–2015)
- Club: Turning Spirit
- Head coach: Wolther Kooistra
- Retired: 2016
Medal record
Representing Netherlands
European Championships
Silver medal – second place	2013 Moscow	Vault
FIG World Cup
Event / 1st / 2nd / 3rd; World Challenge Cup / 1 / 1 / 2

Noël van Klaveren (born 27 November 1995) is a Dutch former artistic gymnast. She won a silver medal on vault at the 2013 European Championships. She is also the 2014 Dutch national vault champion.

== Gymnastics career ==
Van Klaveren won a silver medal on the vault and a bronze medal on the floor exercise at the 2013 Cottbus World Challenge Cup. She then competed at the 2013 European Championships and advanced into the all-around final, finishing 16th. In the vault final, she tied with Romania's Larisa Iordache to win the silver medal, behind Giulia Steingruber. She was the Netherlands' first European medalist on the vault since Verona van de Leur won silver in 2002. At the Osijek World Challenge Cup, she won the vault title. She did not advance into the vault final at the 2013 World Championships due to a fall, but she did advance into the all-around final. There, she finished 20th after falling off the uneven bars.

After the 2013 World Championships, Van Klaveren took a break from gymnastics to be with her father, who had been diagnosed with lung cancer. As a result, she missed the 2014 European Championships. She returned to competition at the 2014 Dutch Championships and won the vault title. She won a bronze medal on the vault at the 2014 Elite Gym Massilia.

Van Klaveren won the vault bronze medal at the 2015 Ljubljana World Challenge Cup. She then finished fourth in the vault final at the 2015 European Championships. Afterwards, she had surgery in her ankle to remove an extra bone and missed the 2015 Dutch Championships. She was not selected to compete at the 2015 World Championships.

After missing the 2016 Summer Olympics, Van Klaveren announced her retirement due to ongoing ankle issues.

== Competitive history ==
Year	Event	Team	AA	VT	UB	BB	FX
2012	Voronin Cup			2nd			3rd
2013	Cottbus World Cup			2nd		4th	3rd
2013	European Championships		16th	2nd			
2013	Turnen Dames Interland		3rd	5th		8th	8th
2013	Osijek World Cup			1st			
2013	World Championships		20th				
2014	National Championships		5th	1st		6th	3rd
2014	Élite Gym Massilia - Open	5th	19th	2nd			6th
2014	Élite Gym Massilia - Master			3rd			
2014	Dutch Team Championships	1st					
2015	Ljubljana World Cup			3rd			
2015	European Championships			4th			
