= Céline van Gerner =

Dutch artistic gymnast

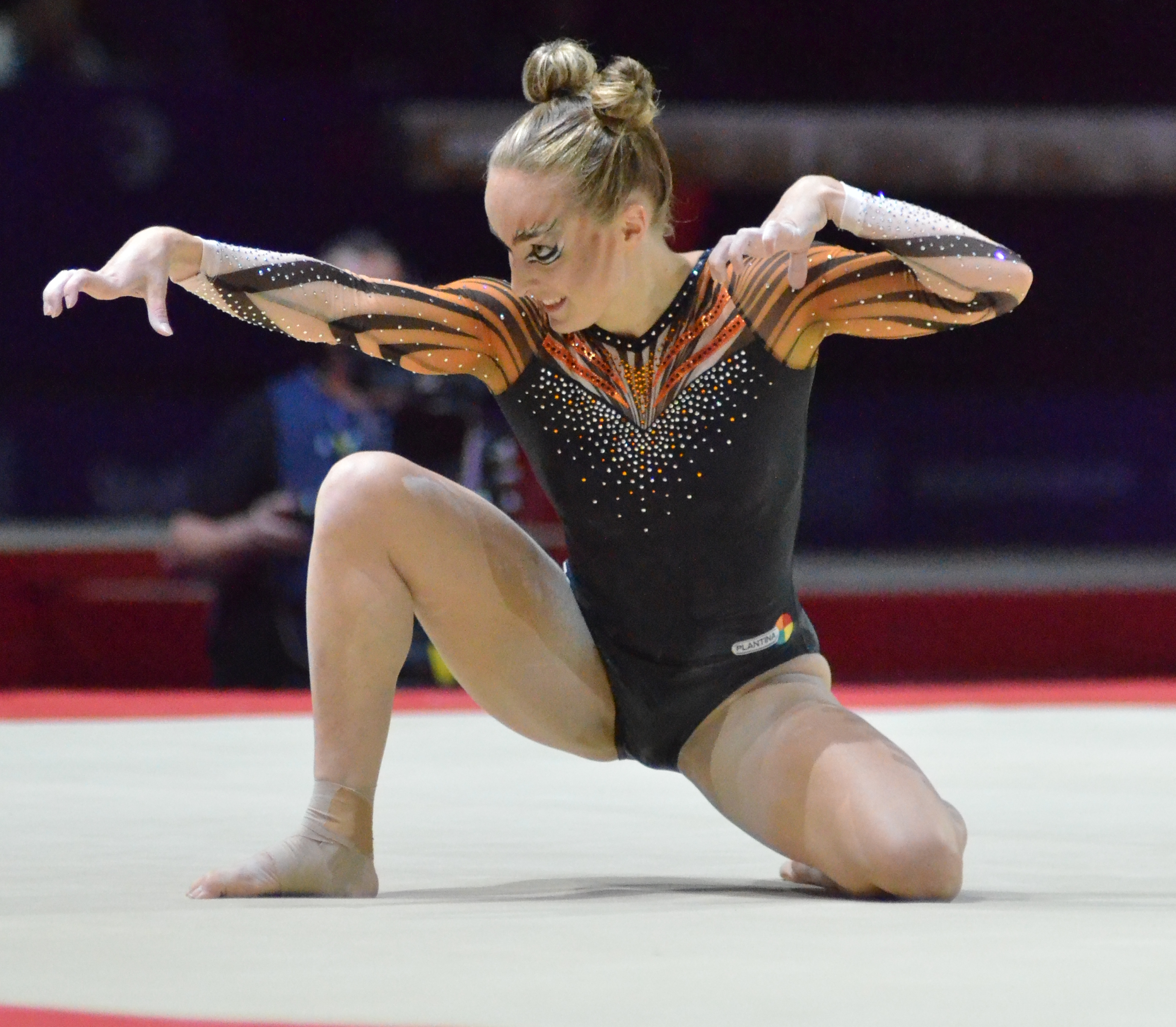
- van Gerner competing at the 2018 European Championships

Personal information
- Full name: Céline Henriette Bianca van Gerner
- Born: 1 December 1994 (age 31) Zwolle, Netherlands
- Height: 1.56 m (5 ft 1 in)

Gymnastics career
- Discipline: Women's artistic gymnastics
- Country represented: Netherlands; (2008–2019)
- Club: Topsport Noord (TSN)
- Head coaches: Gerben Wiersma, José van der Veen
- Retired: 7 August 2019
Medal record
Representing Netherlands
European Championships
| Bronze medal – third place | 2018 Glasgow | Team |
European Games
| Bronze medal – third place | 2015 Baku | Team |
FIG World Cup
Event / 1st / 2nd / 3rd; Apparatus World Cup / 4 / 3 / 0

Céline Henriette Bianca van Gerner (born 1 December 1994) is a retired Dutch elite artistic gymnast, two-time Olympian, and bronze medalist at the 2018 European Championships

== Early life ==
Van Gerner was born in Zwolle, Netherlands, but grew up in Emmeloord. She took up gymnastics at age seven at a local club in Emmeloord, Netherlands, and later moved to Turncentrum Sportstad Heerenveen (TSH). She is a two-time Olympian, having competed in the London games in 2012 (where she finished 12th in the all-around and 9th on UB) and again at the Rio games in 2016 as part of the Dutch team; they are the first Dutch team to participate in the games since 1976 (team members Céline van Gerner, Sanne Wevers, Lieke Wevers, Vera van Pol, Eythora Thorsdottir) and finished in 7th place.

== Career ==
=== 2008—2009 ===
Van Gerner competed at the 2008 EK Juniors Clermont Ferrand in France where the Netherlands placed 3rd in team competition. In 2009, she became the Dutch Junior Champion. She later competed at EYOF, Finland where she placed third in the all-around, third on balance beam, third in team final. She was named Sportswoman of the year in the province of Flevoland and Sporting Talent of the year for the Northeast KNGU.

=== 2010–2012 ===
Van Gerner became age-eligible for senior level competition in 2010. She competed at WK Rotterdam where she placed nineteenth in the all-around and ninth in the team final. Later she competed at EK Birmingham and placed fourth on balance beam. She was again named Sportswoman of the year in the province of Flevoland and Sportswoman of the year for the Northeast KNGU.

Van Gerner competed at the 2011 Dutch Championships where she placed first in the all-around and on floor exercise and uneven bars. She competed at EK Berlin where she placed seventh in the all-around and on uneven bars. Later that year Van Gerner competed at the 2011 World Championships in Tokyo where she placed seventeenth in the all-around. She competed at the 2011 Challenger Cup Cottbus where she placed second on balance beam. She once again won the award for Sportswoman of the year for the Northeast KNGU.

In 2012 van Gerner competed at EK Brussels where she placed fifth on the uneven bars. She competed at three Challenger Cups. In Ghent she won on the uneven bars and placed second on balance beam. In Maribor she won gold on both uneven bars and balance beam. In Cottbus she placed second on uneven bars. At the 2012 Dutch Championships she won gold in the all-around and on uneven bars and won silver on balance beam. She competed at the 2012 Summer Olympic Games in London where she placed twelfth in the all-around and was the first reserve on uneven bars. She once again won the award for Sportswoman of the year for the Northeast KNGU.

=== 2013—2016 ===
In 2013, van Gerner competed at the Dutch Championships where she won silver in the all-around. In 2014, she competed at the 2014 World Championships in Nanning, China, but did not qualify to any finals.

Van Gerner competed at the 2015 European Games in Baku, Azerbaijan where she placed fifth on uneven bars and won a bronze medal in team competition alongside Lieke Wevers and Lisa Top. She later competed at the WOGA Classic in Dallas, Texas. She won a gold medal on balance beam and a silver medal in the all-around. Again, she won the award for Sportswoman of the year for the Northeast KNGU.

In 2016, van Gerner competed at the Stuttgart World Cup where she placed sixth. She later competed at the 2016 Dutch Championships where she placed second in the all-around. At the Olympic Qualifying Tournament in Heerenvee, she placed third and was added to the Olympic Team alongside Sanne Wevers, Lieke Wevers, Vera van Pol, and Eythora Thorsdottir. The team placed seventh at the 2016 Olympics in Rio de Janeiro. Again she won the award for Sportswoman of the year for the Northeast KNGU.

=== 2018–2019 ===
In 2018, van Gerner competed at the Koper Cup Challenge where she won gold on the balance beam and silver on uneven bars, behind Barbora Mokošová. She later competed at the 2018 Dutch Championships where she won silver in the all-around and on balance beam and won gold on uneven bars. Later she competed at the Heerenveen Friendly where the Netherlands won silver in the team competition. She was named to the team to compete at the 2018 European Championships. There she won bronze with the Netherlands in the team competition and placed fourth on the floor exercise. She made headlines during the floor exercise final due to wearing full cat make-up during her performance. In September it was announced that van Gerner would forgo competing at the 2018 World Championships and get surgery on her achilles tendon, which has been bothering her since 2016. In October the FIG introduced a ban on theatrical make-up, citing van Gerner as the example.

In May of 2019, it was announced that van Gerner would compete at the 2019 European Games alongside Naomi Visser. The following month she pulled out after deciding she was still physically recovering from her surgery. She announced her retirement in August 2019, stating that her heart was no longer fully in it.

== Competitive history ==
Competitive history of Céline van Gerner
| Year | Event | Team | AA | VT | UB | BB | FX |
|---|---|---|---|---|---|---|---|
| 2010 | EK Berlin | | | | | 4 | |
| 2010 | World Championships | | 19 | | | | |
| 2011 | Challenger Cup Cottbus | | | | | 2nd place, silver medalist(s) | |
| 2011 | EK Berlin | | 7 | | 7 | | |
| 2011 | Dutch Championships | | 1st place, gold medalist(s) | | 1st place, gold medalist(s) | | 1st place, gold medalist(s) |
| 2011 | World Championships | | 17 | | | | |
| 2012 | Challenger Cup Cottbus | | | | 2nd place, silver medalist(s) | | |
| 2012 | EK Brussels | | | | 5 | | |
| 2012 | Challenger Cup Maribor | | | | 1st place, gold medalist(s) | 1st place, gold medalist(s) | |
| 2012 | Challenger Cup Ghent | | | | 1st place, gold medalist(s) | 5 | |
| 2012 | Dutch Championships | | 1st place, gold medalist(s) | | 1st place, gold medalist(s) | 2nd place, silver medalist(s) | |
| 2012 | Olympic Games | | 19 | | | | |
| 2013 | Dutch Championships | | 2nd place, silver medalist(s) | | | | |
| 2014 | Rencontre Internationale | | 1st place, gold medalist(s) | | | | |
| 2015 | WOGA Classic | | 2nd place, silver medalist(s) | | | 1st place, gold medalist(s) | |
| 2015 | European Games | 3rd place, bronze medalist(s) | | | 5 | | |
| 2016 | Sidijk Tournament | | | | | 2nd place, silver medalist(s) | 3rd place, bronze medalist(s) |
| 2016 | Stuttgart World Cup | | 6 | | | | |
| 2016 | Dutch Championships | | 2nd place, silver medalist(s) | | | | |
| 2016 | Dutch Olympic Qualifier | | 4 | | 1st place, gold medalist(s) | | 2nd place, silver medalist(s) |
| 2016 | Olympic Games | 7 | | | | | |
| 2018 | Koper Challenge Cup | | | | 2nd place, silver medalist(s) | 1st place, gold medalist(s) | |
| 2018 | Dutch Championships | | | | 1st place, gold medalist(s) | 2nd place, silver medalist(s) | |
| 2018 | Heerenveen Friendly | 2nd place, silver medalist(s) | | | | | |
| 2018 | European Championships | 3rd place, bronze medalist(s) | | | | | 4 |
