= Naomi Visser =

Dutch artistic gymnast (born 2001)

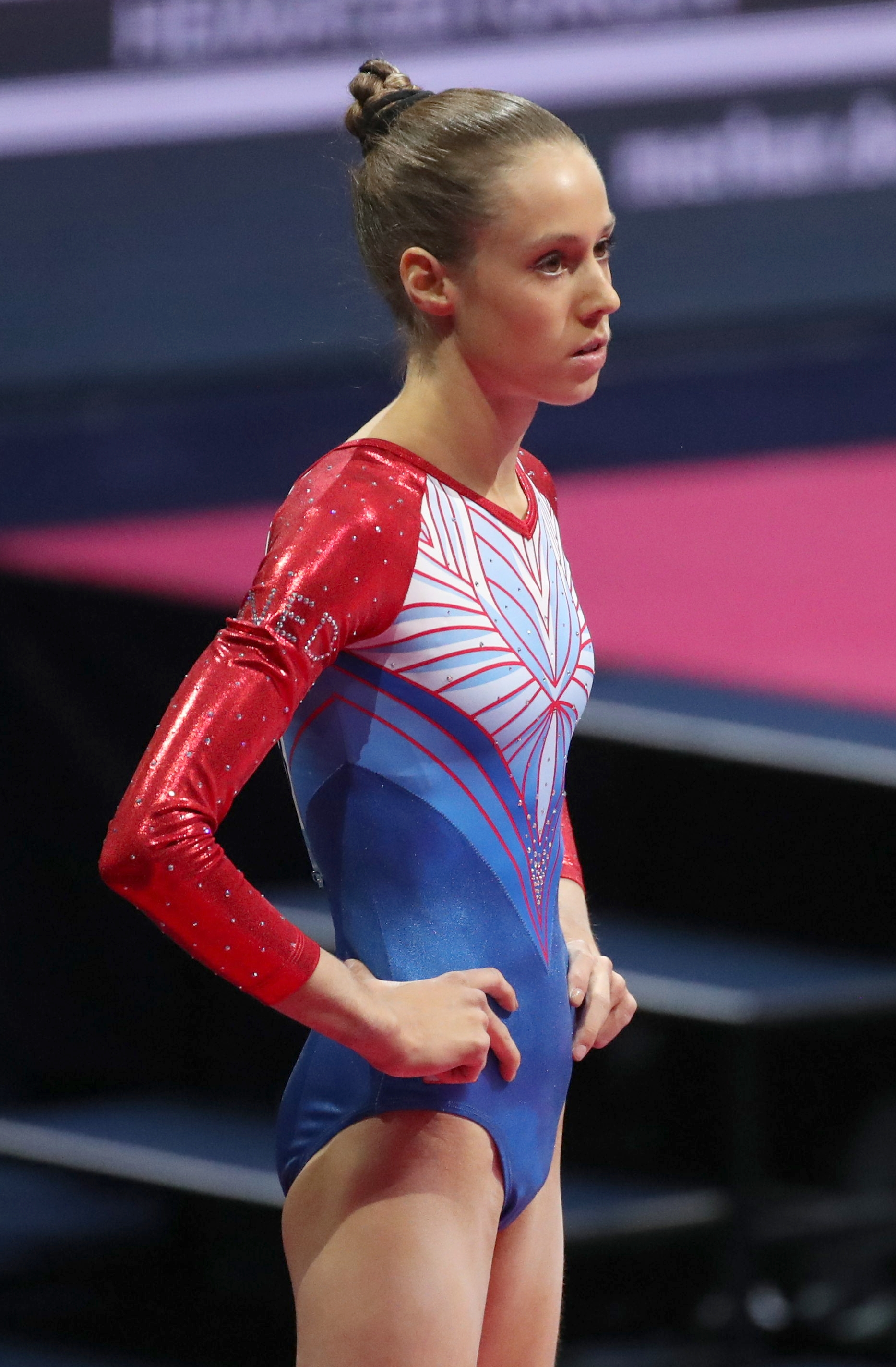
- Visser at the 2022 European Championships

Personal information
- Born: 24 August 2001 (age 25) Papendrecht, Netherlands

Gymnastics career
- Discipline: Women's artistic gymnastics
- Country represented: Netherlands; (2015–present)
- Club: Topsportcentrum Noord
- Head coach: Vincent Wevers
Medal record
Representing Netherlands
European Championships
Bronze medal – third place	2018 Glasgow	Team
Bronze medal – third place	2023 Antalya	Team
FIG World Cup
Event	1st	2nd	3rd
Apparatus World Cup	0	1	0
World Challenge Cup	1	0	2
Total	1	1	2

Naomi Visser (born 24 August 2001) is a Dutch artistic gymnast. She was part of the bronze medal-winning teams at the 2018 and 2023 European Championships. She represented the Netherlands at the 2024 Summer Olympics.

== Early life ==
Visser was born in 2001 in Papendrecht. She started gymnastics at the age of six.

== Gymnastics career ==
=== 2018–19 ===
At the 2018 European Championships, Visser helped the Netherlands win the team bronze medal. At the 2018 World Championships, she finished 14th in the all-around.

At the 2019 European Games, Visser finished seventh in the all-around and fifth on uneven bars. At the 2019 World Championships, she helped the Netherlands team finish eighth and finished 23rd in the all-around.

=== 2021 ===
At the 2021 European Championships Visser finished ninth in the all-around. She was initially an alternate for the Dutch team at the 2020 Olympic Games; however she tested positive for COVID-19 only weeks prior to departure for Tokyo and was unable to travel. In October Visser competed at the World Championships in Kitakyushu. She qualified to the all-around final where she finished fifth. In doing so she set a record as the highest placing Dutch female artistic gymnast in a World all-around final.

=== 2022 ===
Visser competed at the Baku World Cup where she won silver on the uneven bars behind Lorette Charpy. At the 2022 European Championships in Munich, Visser helped the Netherlands qualify to the team final, where they finished fourth behind Italy, Great Britain, and Germany. Individually Visser finished sixth in the all-around, sixth on floor exercise, and seventh on the uneven bars. At the World Championships Visser qualified to three individual finals: all-around, uneven bars, and floor exercise. She finished eighteenth in the all-around, seventh on uneven bars, and fifth on floor exercise.

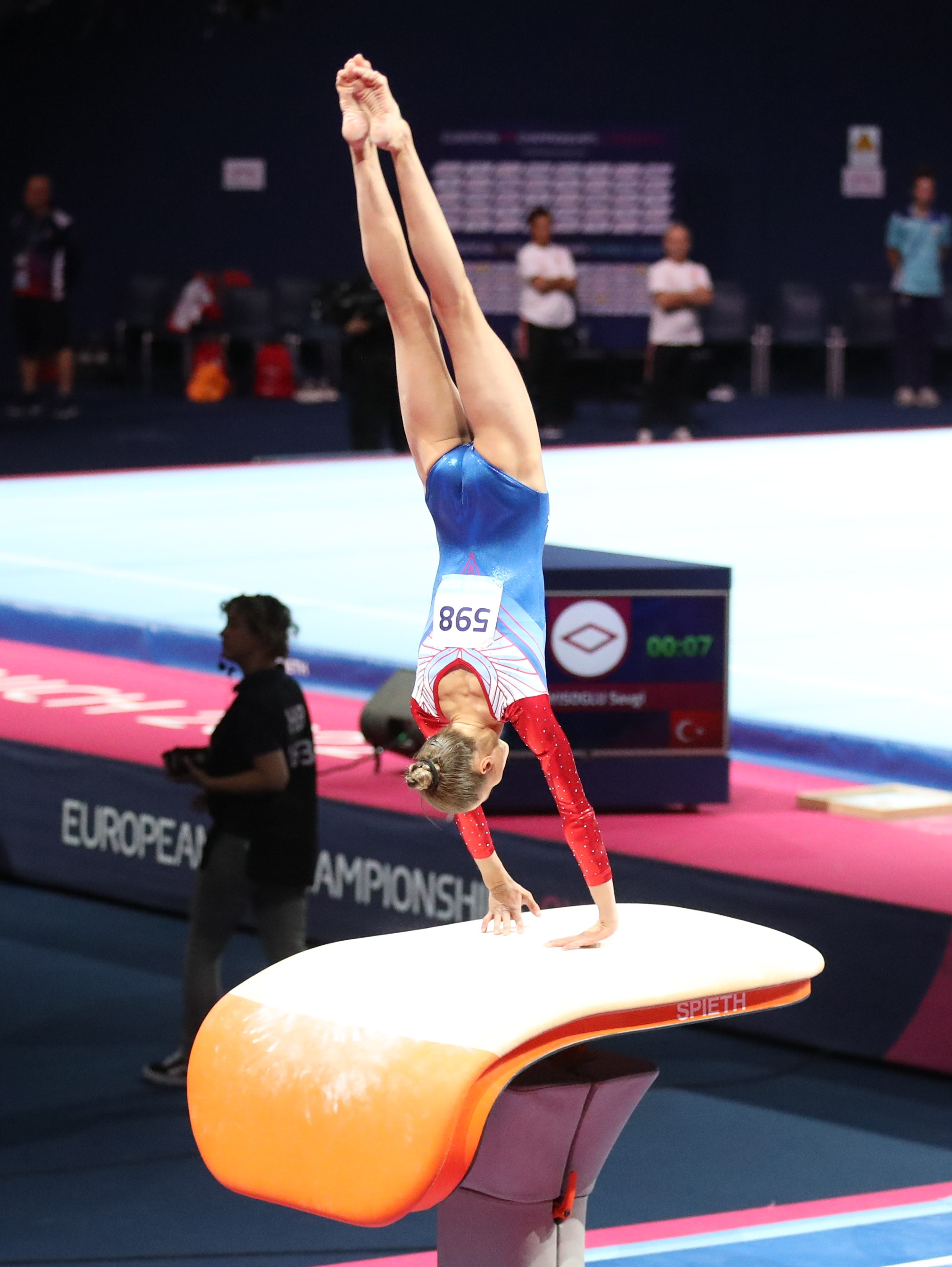
Vault (qualifications)

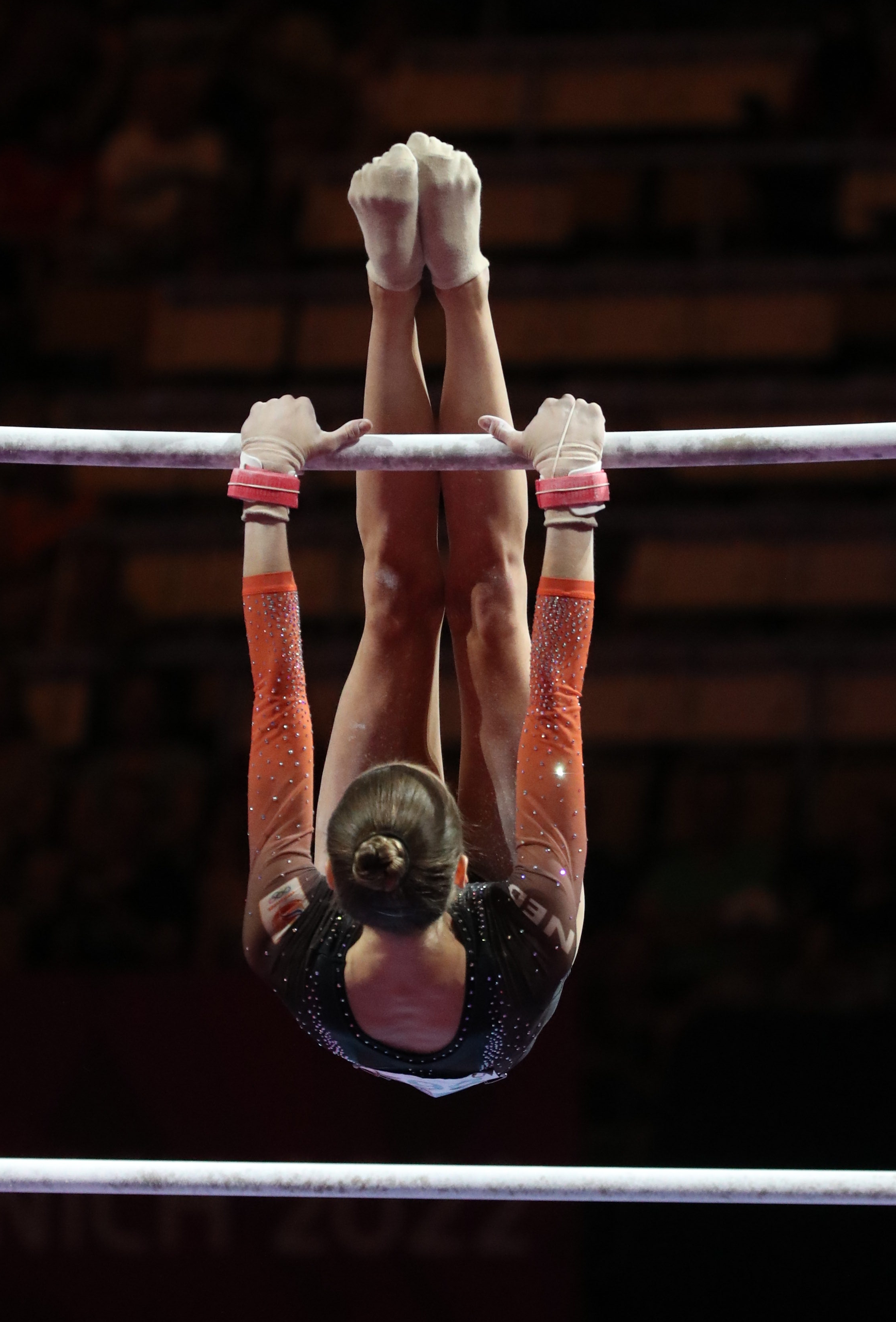
Uneven Bars Final

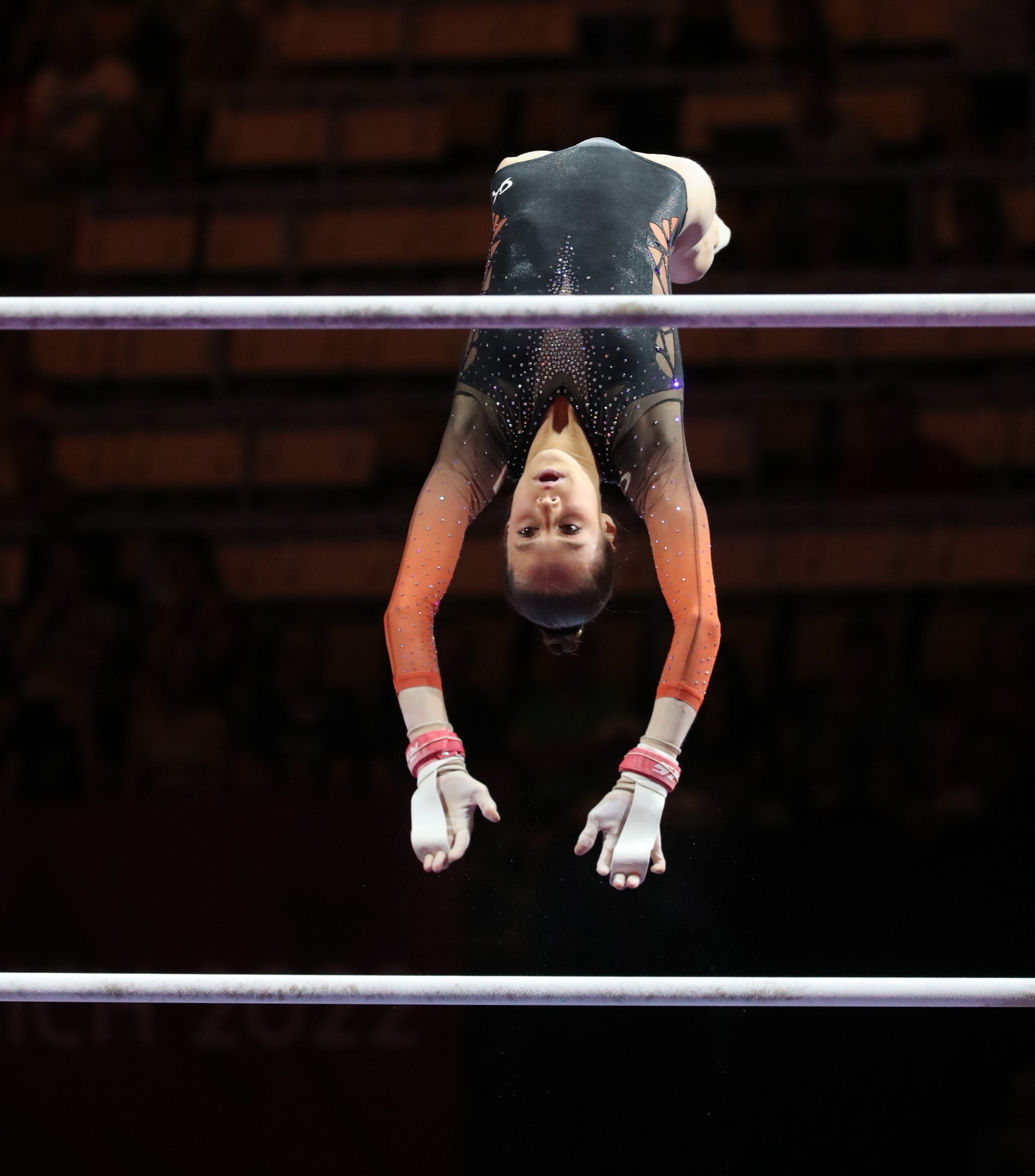
Uneven Bars Final

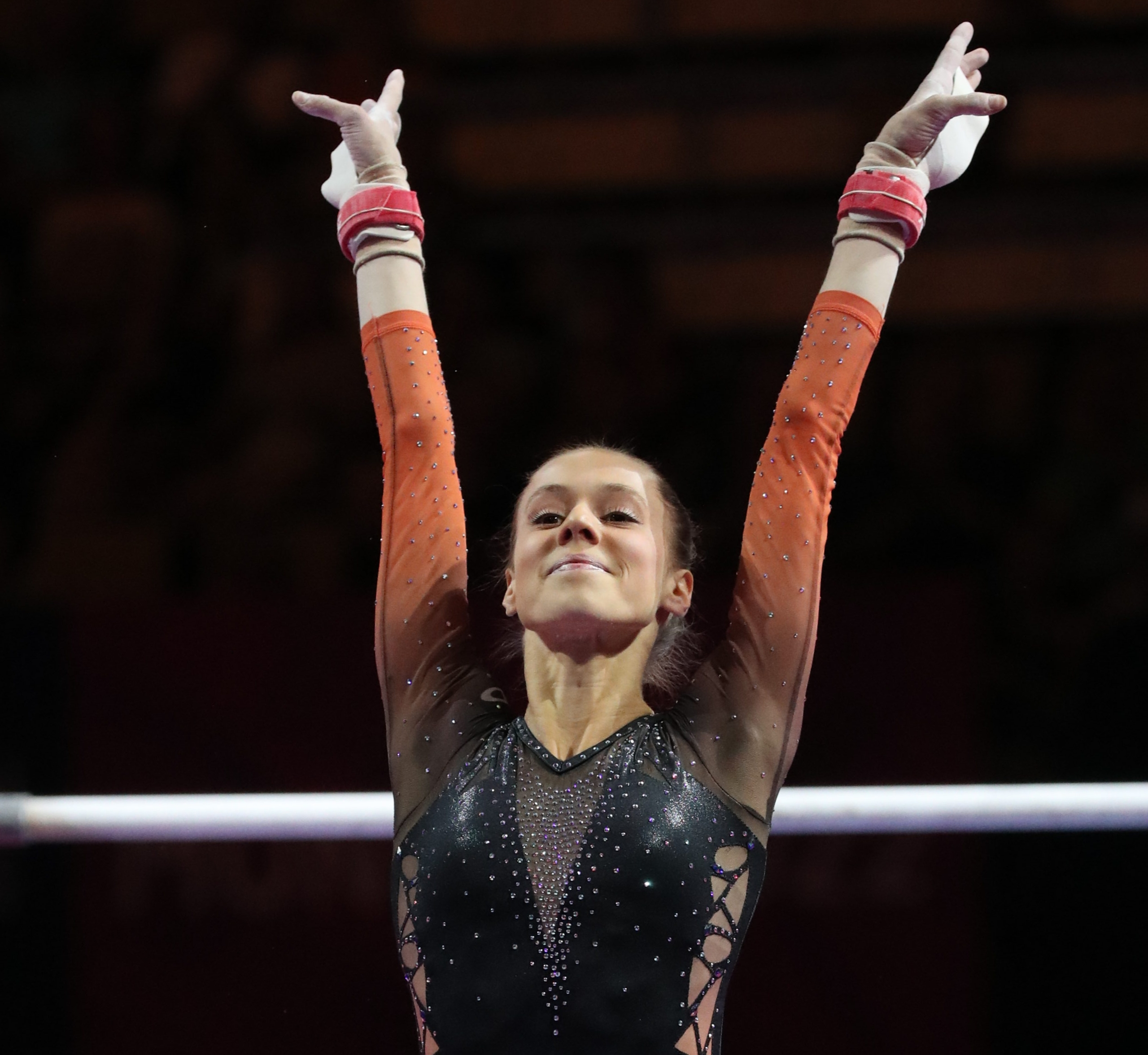
Uneven Bars Final

Visser at the 2022 European Championships

=== 2023 ===
Visser competed at the European Championships where she helped the Netherlands finish third as a team. Individually she placed seventh in the all-around, eighth on uneven bars, and fourth on floor exercise. At the 2023 World Championships she helped the Netherlands finish seventh as a team. Individually she finished twelfth in the all-around, seventh on uneven bars, and sixth on floor exercise.

=== 2024 ===
Visser competed at the Antalya World Challenge Cup in March where she finished seventh on the floor exercise. In July, Visser was selected to represent the Netherlands at the 2024 Summer Olympics alongside Lieke Wevers, Sanne Wevers, Vera van Pol, and Sanna Veerman.

=== 2025 ===
In April, Visser competed on uneven bars and balance beam at the Osijek World Cup, finishing eight on beam. Visser represented the Netherlands at the 2025 European Gymnastics Championships in May, alongside Elze Guerts, Floor Sloof, Tisha Volleman, and Mara Slippens. They finished fifth as a team. Individually, Visser secured a sixth-place finish in the all-around final and qualified for the uneven bars final, where she ultimately finished eighth. In October, Visser competed at the 2025 World Gymnastics Championships. She placed ninth in the all-around final. She also qualified for the uneven bars final, where she tied for sixth place with Leila Vasileva.

== Competitive history ==
Competitive history of Naomi Visser at the junior level
Year	Event	Team	AA	VT	UB	BB	FX
2015	Sidijk Tournament		4				
2015	FIT Challenge	7	33				
2015	Top Gym Tournament		8	10	9	15	7
2016	Sidijk Tournament		2nd place, silver medalist(s)				
2016	Austrian Team Open		14				
2016	IAG SportEvent		2nd place, silver medalist(s)				
2016	European Championships	9					7
2016	Dutch Championships		2nd place, silver medalist(s)		4	4	1st place, gold medalist(s)
2016	Wase Gymcup		1st place, gold medalist(s)				
2016	Dutch Team Championships	2nd place, silver medalist(s)	5				
2016	Top Gym Tournament	3rd place, bronze medalist(s)	2nd place, silver medalist(s)		7	8	5

Competitive history of Naomi Visser at the senior level
Year	Event	Team	AA	VT	UB	BB	FX
2017	IAG SportEvent		1st place, gold medalist(s)				
2017	FIT Challenge	5	14				
2017	Dutch Championships		10		1st place, gold medalist(s)		4
2017	Elite Gym Massilia		12				5
2018	Dutch Championships		4		3rd place, bronze medalist(s)	5	
2018	Heerenveen Friendly	2nd place, silver medalist(s)	2nd place, silver medalist(s)		10		8
2018	European Championships	3rd place, bronze medalist(s)					
2018	Varsenare Friendly	2nd place, silver medalist(s)	2nd place, silver medalist(s)				
2018	World Championships	10	14				
2019	FIT Challenge	1st place, gold medalist(s)	1st place, gold medalist(s)				
2019	Dutch Championships		1st place, gold medalist(s)				
2019	European Games		7		5		
2019	Heerenveen Friendly	2nd place, silver medalist(s)	3rd place, bronze medalist(s)				
2019	2nd Heerenveen Friendly	1st place, gold medalist(s)	1st place, gold medalist(s)				
2019	World Championships	8	23				
2021	Heerenveen Friendly		2nd place, silver medalist(s)				
2021	European Championships		9				
2021	World Championships	—N/a	5				
2022	Baku World Cup				2nd place, silver medalist(s)	6	8
2022	Dutch Championships		1st place, gold medalist(s)		1st place, gold medalist(s)	1st place, gold medalist(s)	1st place, gold medalist(s)
2022	European Championships	4	6		7		6
2022	Dutch World Trials		3rd place, bronze medalist(s)				
2022	World Championships	9	18		7		5
2023
2023	European Championships	3rd place, bronze medalist(s)	7		8		4
2023	Varna Challenge Cup				4	3rd place, bronze medalist(s)	
2023	Osijek Challenge Cup				1st place, gold medalist(s)	3rd place, bronze medalist(s)	
2023	World Championships	7	12		7		6
2024	Antalya Challenge Cup						7
2024	Olympic Games	9	10				
2024	Arthur Gander Memorial		5				
2024	Swiss Cup	5					
2025
2025	European Championships	5	6		8		
2025	World Championships	—N/a	9		6		
2026
2026	European Championships	6	4		8		
2026	World Championships		11		5		R2
