= Lisa Top =

Dutch artistic gymnast

- Full name: Lisa Evelien Top
- Born: 13 August 1996 (age 30) Gouda, Netherlands
- Height: 1.62 m (5 ft 4 in)

Gymnastics career
- Discipline: Women's artistic gymnastics
- Club: Heerenveen
- Head coach: Gerben Wiersma
Medal record
Representing Netherlands
European Games
Bronze medal – third place	2015 Baku	Team
Bronze medal – third place	2015 Baku	Vault

Lisa Evelien Top (born 13 August 1996) is a Dutch artistic gymnast. A Senior National Team member since 2012, she participated in both the 2014 and 2015 World Championships as well as the 2015 European Games.

== Early life ==
Top was born on 13 August 1996 in Gouda, to Josephine Top. Top first got into gymnastics at the age of four; her friend took her to a gymnastics class and the trainers insisted that Lisa and her parents enroll her in full-time gymnastics courses. Consequently, she began training at the DOS Heerhugowaard gymnastics club.

In 2009, at the age of 12, she left her family in Heerhugowaard to train at the prestigious Turncentrum Sportstad Heerenveen in Heerenveen. Physically, it would have been impossible for Top to commute an hour and a half each day to train at the club, so she stayed with a host family.

== Junior International Elite career ==
=== 2009 ===
Despite a gym change and leaving home, she finished third in the all-around at the 2009 Dutch National Championships.

=== 2010 ===
Top was named to the Netherlands delegation for the 2010 European Women's Artistic Gymnastics Championships, held in Birmingham, England. In the qualification competition, she advanced to the all-around final (15th) and the floor exercise final (8th). In her finals, Top turned in a 7th-place finish in the all-around final. Additionally, she also placed 7th in the floor final.

Later, in June 2010, she finished second in the all-around at the 2010 Dutch National Championships. Although Top was the highest placed Dutch female junior at the 2010 Europeans competition, Tess Moonen was awarded the Netherlands qualification spot in women's gymnastics for the 2010 Youth Olympics.

=== 2011 ===
In May 2011, Top finished second at the 2011 Pre-Olympic Youth Cup in Bergisch Gladbach, Germany. A month later, Top was crowned the 2011 Dutch National Junior champion in the all-around and on all four events.

As a result of her performances at the 2011 Dutch Nationals, Top was named to the Dutch delegation for the 2011 European Youth Summer Olympic Festival in the Trabzon, Turkey during July 2011. In the qualification round, she advanced to the all-around final. Additionally, Lisa was a reserve for both the vault and uneven bars finals. Eventually, Top placed tenth in the all-around final.

In November, she participated in the Massilia Cup in Marseille, France and finished eighteenth in the all-around.

== Senior International Elite career ==
=== 2012 ===
Top's inaugural Senior National Team assignment was the 2012 Olympic Gymnastics Test Event in London. Although the Dutch team did not advance to the Olympics as a full team, Top finished twenty-sixth in the all-around; the highest position of the Dutch team.

Later in the year, in May, Top made the 2012 European Women's Artistic Gymnastics Championships team. She finished fifteenth in the all-around during the team competition.

In June 2012, she participated in the Maribor World Cup competition and was the bronze medallist on floor. Later, she participated in the Ghent World Cup and finished second in the floor exercise.

At the 2012 Dutch Nationals, she finished second in the all-around. As the Dutch Gymnastics Federation had only qualified one women's artistic gymnastics representative to the 2012 Summer Olympics, the spot was filled by National all-around champion, Céline van Gerner. Her final competition of the year was the Ostrava World Cup in November 2012. At this event, she won a silver medal in the uneven bars.

=== 2013 ===
In December 2012, Top reported on her personal website that she had sustained an elbow injury during a tumbling pass in training. She remained out of competition for most of the start of the 2013 elite season, but first announced that she was back in training in June 2013; when she took a trip with the Netherlands team to Dallas, Texas training at WOGA.

Top returned to competitive gymnastics in October 2013, at the Wase Gym Cup. She won the all-around at the competition. Her final competition was the International of Calais in December 2013. She finished second in the all-around behind Tatiana Nabieva.

=== 2014 ===
Top was named to the Dutch team for the 2014 European Women's Artistic Gymnastics Championships.
