= Rings at the Olympics =

Rings at the Olympic Games
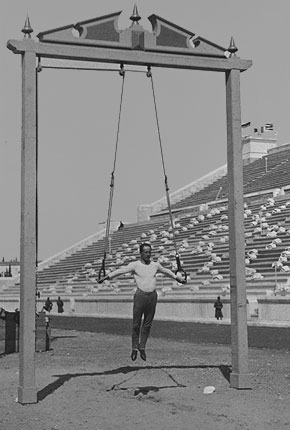
- Rings competition at the 1896 Summer Olympics

Overview
- Sport: Artistic gymnastics
- Gender: Men
- Years held: Men: 1896, 1904, 1924–2024

Reigning champion
- Men: Liu Yang (CHN)

The rings is an artistic gymnastics event held at the Summer Olympics. The event was first held for men at the first modern Olympics in 1896. It was held again in 1904, but not in 1900, 1908, 1912, or 1920 when no apparatus events were awarded medals. However, the rings was one of the components of the men's artistic individual all-around in 1900, 1908, and 1912. The men's rings returned as a medal event in 1924 and has been held every Games since. Rings scores were included in the individual all-around for 1924 and 1928, with no separate apparatus final. In 1932, the rings was entirely separate from the all-around. From 1936 to 1956, there were again no separate apparatus finals with the rings scores used in the all-around. Beginning in 1960, there were separate apparatus finals.

== Medalists ==
=== Men ===
Games	Gold	Silver	Bronze
1896 Athens	Ioannis Mitropoulos; Greece	Hermann Weingärtner; Germany	Petros Persakis; Greece
1900 Paris	Not held		
1904 St. Louis	Herman Glass; United States	William Merz; United States	Emil Voigt; United States
1908 London	Not held		
1912 Stockholm	Not held		
1920 Antwerp	Not held		
1924 Paris	Francesco Martino; Italy	Robert Pražák; Czechoslovakia	Ladislav Vácha; Czechoslovakia
1928 Amsterdam	Leon Štukelj; Yugoslavia	Ladislav Vácha; Czechoslovakia	Emanuel Löffler; Czechoslovakia
1932 Los Angeles	George Gulack; United States	Bill Denton; United States	Giovanni Lattuada; Italy
1936 Berlin	Alois Hudec; Czechoslovakia	Leon Štukelj; Yugoslavia	Matthias Volz; Germany
1948 London	Karl Frei; Switzerland	Michael Reusch; Switzerland	Zdeněk Růžička; Czechoslovakia
1952 Helsinki	Hrant Shahinyan; Soviet Union	Viktor Chukarin; Soviet Union	Hans Eugster; Switzerland Dmytro Leonkin; Soviet Union
1956 Melbourne	Albert Azaryan; Soviet Union	Valentin Muratov; Soviet Union	Masumi Kubota; Japan Masao Takemoto; Japan
1960 Rome	Albert Azaryan; Soviet Union	Boris Shakhlin; Soviet Union	Velik Kapsazov; Bulgaria Takashi Ono; Japan
1964 Tokyo	Takuji Hayata; Japan	Franco Menichelli; Italy	Boris Shakhlin; Soviet Union
1968 Mexico City	Akinori Nakayama; Japan	Mikhail Voronin; Soviet Union	Sawao Kato; Japan
1972 Munich	Akinori Nakayama; Japan	Mikhail Voronin; Soviet Union	Mitsuo Tsukahara; Japan
1976 Montreal	Nikolai Andrianov; Soviet Union	Alexander Dityatin; Soviet Union	Danuţ Grecu; Romania
1980 Moscow	Alexander Dityatin; Soviet Union	Aleksandr Tkachyov; Soviet Union	Jiří Tabák; Czechoslovakia
1984 Los Angeles	Li Ning; China Koji Gushiken; Japan	Not awarded	Mitchell Gaylord; United States
1988 Seoul	Holger Behrendt; East Germany Dmitri Bilozertchev; Soviet Union	Not awarded	Sven Tippelt; East Germany
1992 Barcelona	Vitaly Scherbo; Unified Team	Li Jing; China	Andreas Wecker; Germany Li Xiaoshuang; China
1996 Atlanta	Jury Chechi; Italy	Szilveszter Csollány; Hungary	Dan Burincă; Romania
2000 Sydney	Szilveszter Csollány; Hungary	Dimosthenis Tampakos; Greece	Yordan Yovchev; Bulgaria
2004 Athens	Dimosthenis Tampakos; Greece	Yordan Yovchev; Bulgaria	Jury Chechi; Italy
2008 Beijing	Chen Yibing; China	Yang Wei; China	Oleksandr Vorobiov; Ukraine
2012 London	Arthur Zanetti; Brazil	Chen Yibing; China	Matteo Morandi; Italy
2016 Rio de Janeiro	Eleftherios Petrounias; Greece	Arthur Zanetti; Brazil	Denis Ablyazin; Russia
2020 Tokyo	Liu Yang; China	You Hao; China	Eleftherios Petrounias; Greece
2024 Paris	Liu Yang; China	Zou Jingyuan; China	Eleftherios Petrounias; Greece

==== Multiple medalists ====
Rank	Gymnast	Nation	Olympics	Gold	Silver	Bronze	Total
1	Albert Azaryan	Soviet Union	1956–1960	2	0	0	2
1	Liu Yang	China	2020–2024	2	0	0	2
1	Akinori Nakayama	Japan	1968–1972	2	0	0	2
4	Leon Štukelj	Yugoslavia	1928–1936	1	1	0	2
4	Alexander Dityatin	Soviet Union	1976–1980	1	1	0	2
4	Szilveszter Csollány	Hungary	1996–2000	1	1	0	2
4	Dimosthenis Tampakos	Greece	2000–2004	1	1	0	2
4	Chen Yibing	China	2008–2012	1	1	0	2
4	Arthur Zanetti	Brazil	2012–2016	1	1	0	2
10	Eleftherios Petrounias	Greece	2016–2024	1	0	2	3
11	Jury Chechi	Italy	1996–2004	1	0	1	2
12	Mikhail Voronin	Soviet Union	1968–1972	0	2	0	2
13	Ladislav Vácha	Czechoslovakia	1924–1928	0	1	1	2
13	Boris Shakhlin	Soviet Union	1960–1964	0	1	1	2
13	Yordan Yovchev	Bulgaria	2000–2004	0	1	1	2

==== Medalists by country ====
Rank	Nation	Gold	Silver	Bronze	Total
1	Soviet Union	6	7	2	17
2	China	4	5	1	10
3	Japan	4	0	5	9
4	Greece	3	1	3	7
5	United States	2	2	2	6
6	Italy	2	1	3	6
7	Czechoslovakia	1	2	4	7
8	Brazil	1	1	0	2
8	Hungary	1	1	0	2
8	Yugoslavia	1	1	0	2
11	East Germany	1	0	1	2
12	Unified Team	1	0	0	1
13	Bulgaria	0	1	2	3
13	Germany	0	1	2	3
15	Romania	0	0	2	2
16	Russia	0	0	1	1
16	Ukraine	0	0	1	1

== Gallery ==
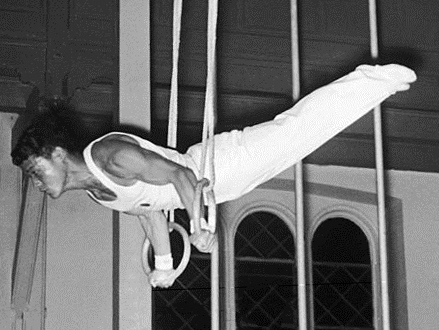
Hikoroku Arimoto, 1936

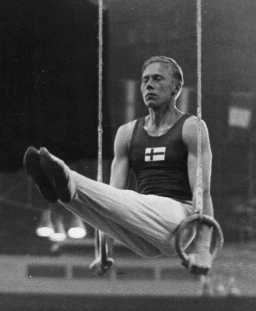
Veikko Huhtanen, 1948

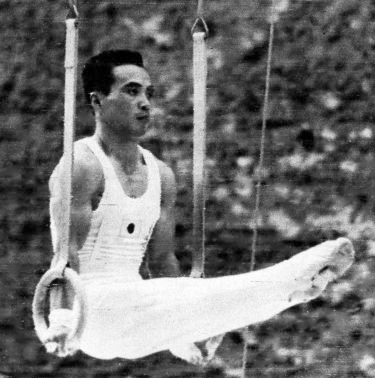
Nobuyuki Aihara, 1960

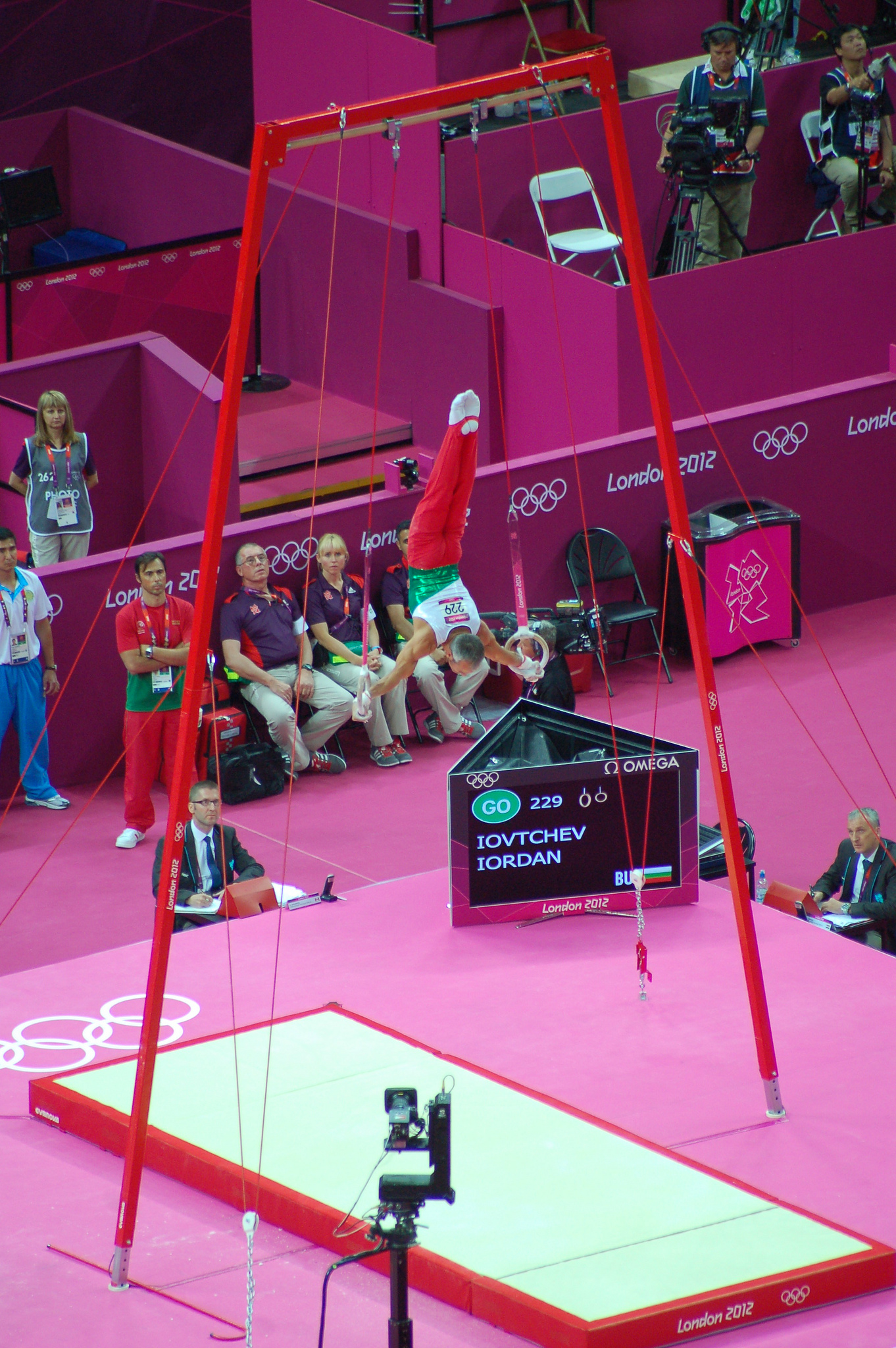
Yordan Yovchev, 2012

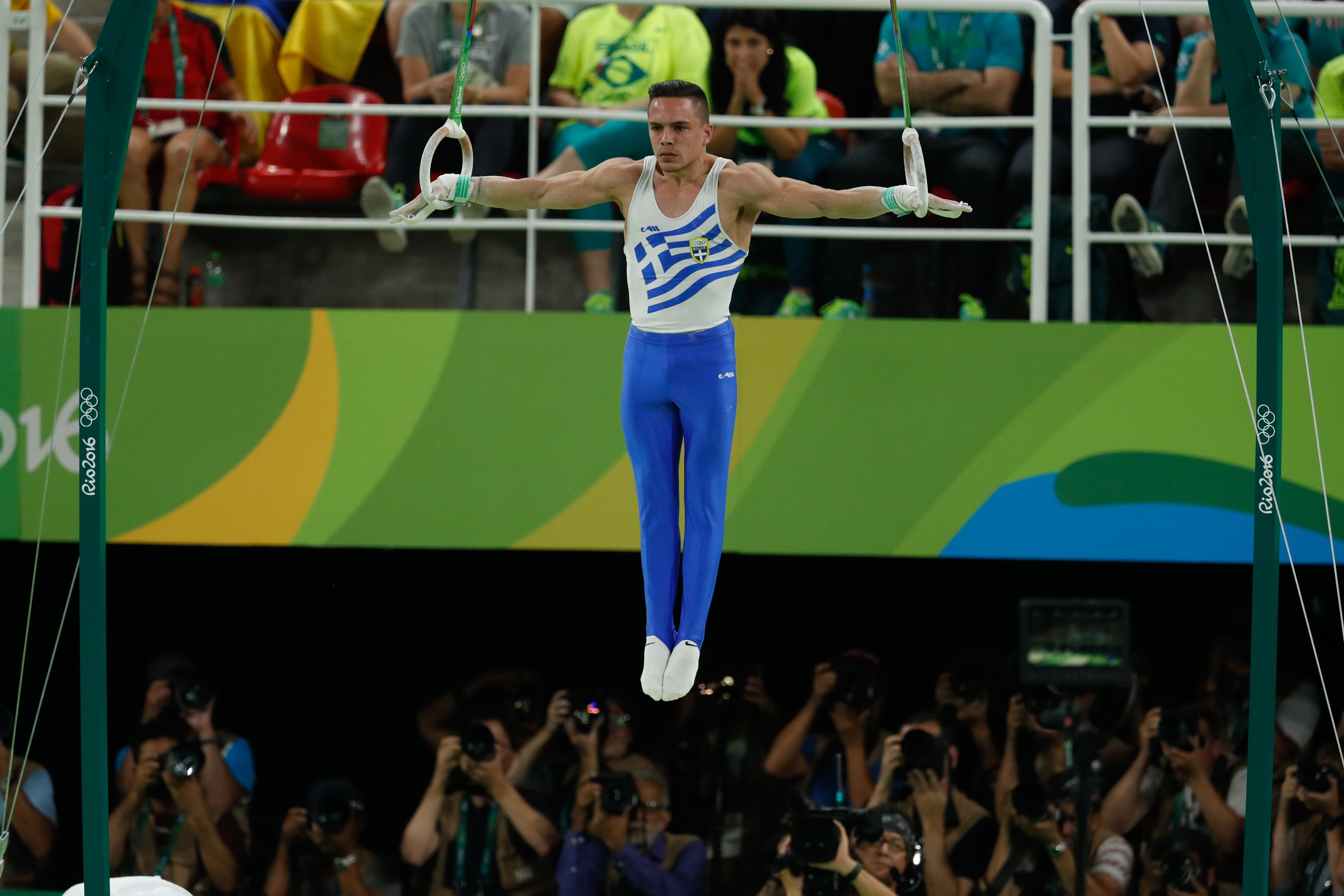
Eleftherios Petrounias, 2016

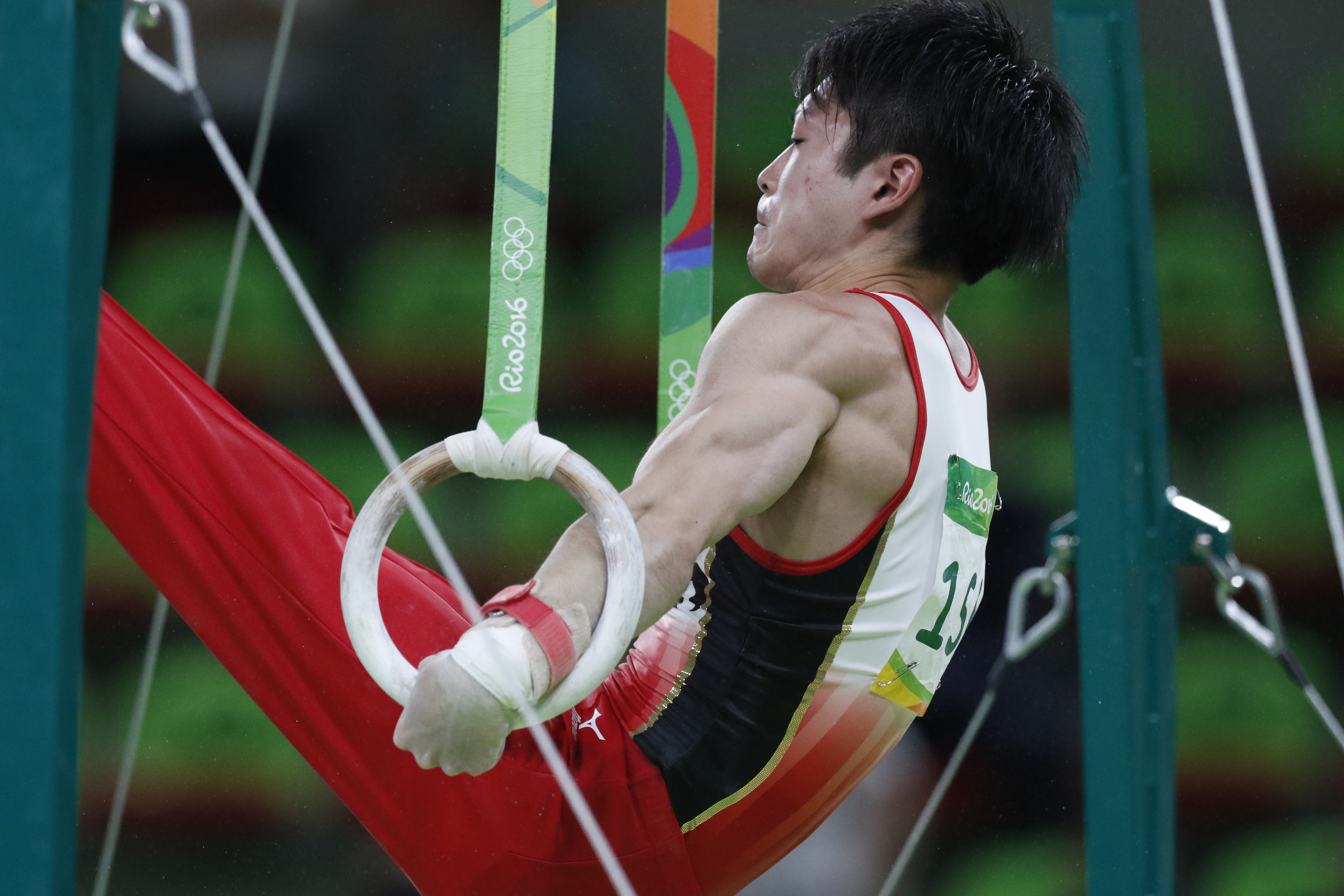
Kōhei Uchimura, 2016

Men's Rings at the Olympics
