= Gymnastics at the 2020 Summer Olympics – Men's rings =

Olympic gymnastics event

Men's rings at the Games of the XXXII Olympiad
- Venue: Ariake Gymnastics Centre
- Date: 24 July 2021 (qualifying); 2 August 2021 (final)
- Competitors: 8 from 6 nations
- Winning score: 15.500 points

Medalists
1st place, gold medalist(s)		Liu Yang	China
2nd place, silver medalist(s)		You Hao	China
3rd place, bronze medalist(s)		Eleftherios Petrounias	Greece

The men's rings event at the 2020 Summer Olympics was held on 24 July and 2 August 2021 at the Ariake Gymnastics Centre. Approximately 70 gymnasts from 35 nations (of the 98 total gymnasts) competed on rings in the qualifying round.

Liu Yang of China won the title for his first individual Olympic medal. Teammate You Hao took silver, also his first individual Olympic medal. Defending champion Eleftherios Petrounias of Greece finished with the bronze.

The medals for the competition were presented by Spyros Capralos, IOC Member, Olympian, Greece; and the medalists' bouquets were presented by Yagi-Kitagawa Tammy, FIG Executive Committee Member; Japan.

== Background ==
This was the 25th appearance of the event, which is one of the five apparatus events held every time there were apparatus events at the Summer Olympics (no apparatus events were held in 1900, 1908, 1912, or 1920).

== Qualification ==
A National Olympic Committee (NOC) could enter up to 6 qualified gymnasts: a team of 4 and up to 2 specialists. A total of 98 quota places are allocated to men's gymnastics.

The 12 teams that qualify will be able to send 4 gymnasts in the team competition, for a total of 48 of the 98 quota places. The top three teams at the 2018 World Artistic Gymnastics Championships (China, Russia, and Japan) and the top nine teams (excluding those already qualified) at the 2019 World Artistic Gymnastics Championships (Ukraine, Great Britain, Switzerland, the United States, Chinese Taipei, South Korea, Brazil, Spain, and Germany) earned team qualification places.

The remaining 50 quota places are awarded individually. Each gymnast can only earn one place, except that gymnasts that competed with a team that qualified are eligible to earn a second place through the 2020 All Around World Cup Series. Some of the individual events are open to gymnasts from NOCs with qualified teams, while others are not. These places are filled through various criteria based on the 2019 World Championships, the 2020 FIG Artistic Gymnastics World Cup series, continental championships, a host guarantee, and a Tripartite Commission invitation.

Each of the 98 qualified gymnasts are eligible for the pommel horse competition, but many gymnasts do not compete in each of the apparatus events.

The COVID-19 pandemic delayed many of the events for qualifying for gymnastics. The 2018 and 2019 World Championships were completed on time, but many of the World Cup series events were delayed into 2021.

== Competition format ==
The top 8 qualifiers in the qualification phase (limit two per NOC) advanced to the apparatus final. The finalists performed an additional exercise. Qualification scores were then ignored, with only final round scores counting.

== Schedule ==
The competition was held over two days, 24 July and 2 August. The qualifying round (for all men's gymnastics events) was the first day with the apparatus final on the second day.

Date	Time	Round	Subdivision
24 July	10:00	Qualification	Subdivision 1
24 July	14:30	Qualification	Subdivision 2
24 July	19:30	Qualification	Subdivision 3
2 August	17:00	Final	–
All times are local time (UTC+09:00).

== Results ==
=== Qualifying ===
Rank	Gymnast	D Score	E Score	Pen.	Total	Qual.
1	Eleftherios Petrounias (GRE)	6.3	9.033		15.333	Q
2	Liu Yang (CHN)	6.4	8.900		15.300	Q
3	Samir Aït Saïd (FRA)	6.3	8.766		15.066	Q
4	İbrahim Çolak (TUR)	6.2	8.733		14.933	Q
5	Arthur Zanetti (BRA)	6.2	8.700		14.900	Q
6	Adem Asil (TUR)	6.2	8.600		14.800	Q
7	Denis Ablyazin (ROC)	6.3	8.500		14.800	Q
8	You Hao (CHN)	6.5	8.300		14.800	Q
9	Marco Lodadio (ITA)	6.4	8.233		14.633	R1
10	Artur Dalaloyan (ROC)	6.0	8.500		14.500	R2
11	Igor Radivilov (UKR)	6.0	8.466		14.466	R3

Reserves

The reserves for the men's rings final were:

1. Marco Lodadio (ITA)
2. Artur Dalaloyan (ROC)
3. Igor Radivilov (UKR)

Only two gymnasts from each country may advance to the event final. No gymnasts were excluded from the final or as reserves because of the quota.

=== Final ===
Rank	Gymnast	D Score	E Score	Pen.	Total
1st place, gold medalist(s)	Liu Yang (CHN)	6.5	9.000		15.500
2nd place, silver medalist(s)	You Hao (CHN)	6.6	8.700		15.300
3rd place, bronze medalist(s)	Eleftherios Petrounias (GRE)	6.3	8.900		15.200
4	Samir Aït Saïd (FRA)	6.3	8.600		14.900
5	İbrahim Çolak (TUR)	6.2	8.666		14.866
6	Denis Ablyazin (ROC)	6.3	8.533		14.833
7	Adem Asil (TUR)	6.2	8.400		14.600
8	Arthur Zanetti (BRA)	6.5	7.633		14.133
