= Gymnastics at the 2016 Summer Olympics – Men's rings =

Olympic gymnastics event

Men's rings at the Games of the XXXI Olympiad
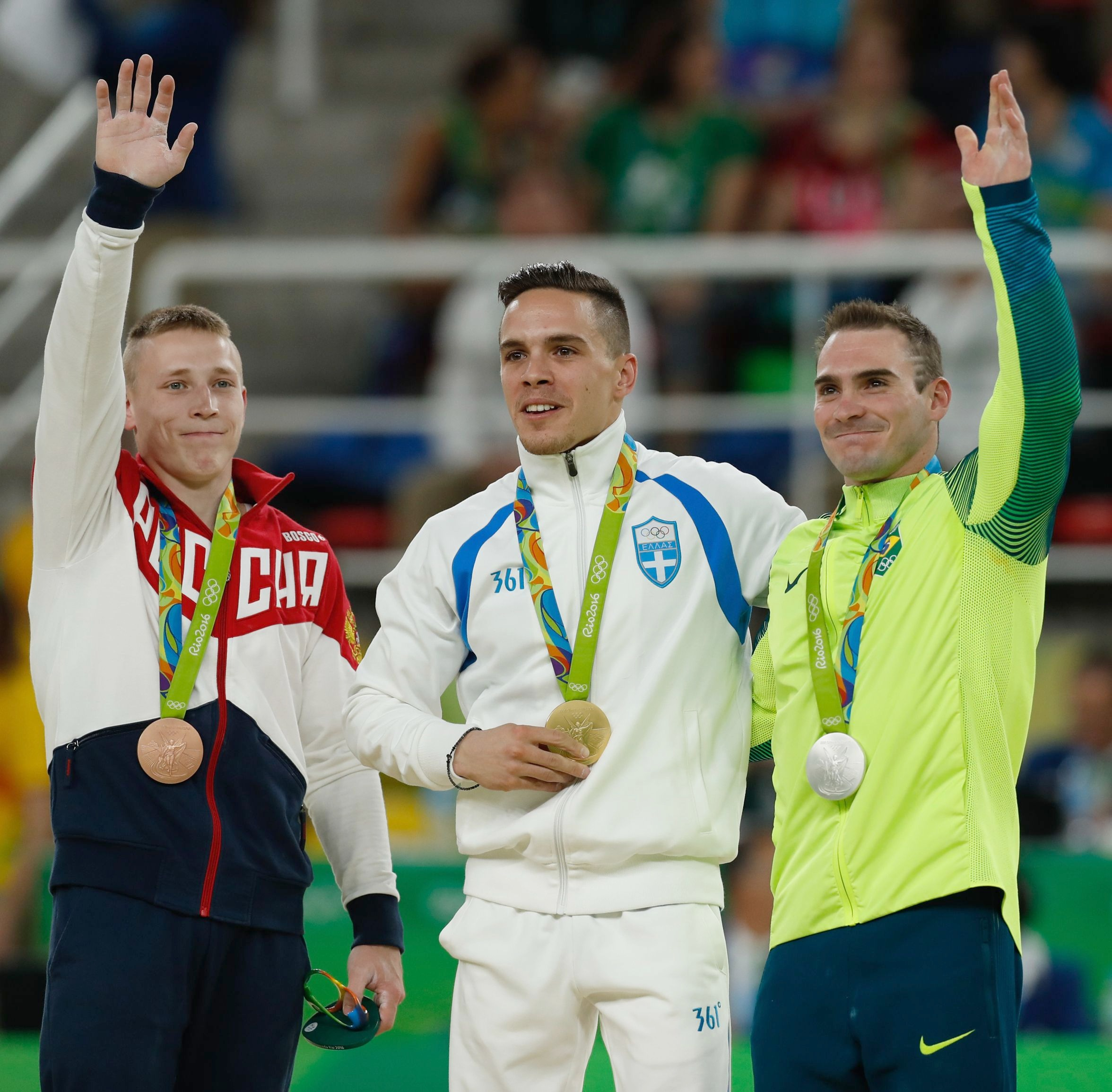
- Left-right: Ablyazin, Petrounias, Zanetti
- Venue: HSBC Arena
- Dates: 6 August (qualifying); 15 August (final)
- Competitors: 70 from 34 nations
- Winning score: 16.000

Medalists
1st place, gold medalist(s)		Eleftherios Petrounias	Greece
2nd place, silver medalist(s)		Arthur Zanetti	Brazil
3rd place, bronze medalist(s)		Denis Ablyazin	Russia

The men's rings competition at the 2016 Summer Olympics was held at the HSBC Arena on 6 and 15 August. There were 70 competitors from 34 nations. The event was won by Eleftherios Petrounias of Greece, the nation's first medal in the men's rings since 2004 (and third overall). Defending champion Arthur Zanetti of Brazil finished second, making him the 13th man to win multiple medals in the event. Denis Ablyazin earned Russia's first post-Soviet medal in the event with his bronze.

The medals were presented by Bernard Rajzman IOC member, Brazil and Wolfgang Willam, FIG Executive Committee Member.

== Background ==
This was the 24th appearance of the event, which is one of the five apparatus events held every time there were apparatus events at the Summer Olympics (no apparatus events were held in 1900, 1908, 1912, or 1920). Two of the eight finalists from 2012 returned: gold medalist Arthur Zanetti of Brazil and fifth-place finisher Denis Ablyazin of Russia. The three world champions since the last games were Zanetti (2013), Liu Yang of China (2014), and Eleftherios Petrounias of Greece (2015). The event was expected to be very competitive.

Cyprus, Lithuania, Monaco, and Turkey each made their debut in the men's rings. The United States made its 22nd appearance, most of any nation; the Americans had missed only the inaugural 1896 rings and the boycotted 1980 Games.

== Qualification ==
Qualification for the men's artistic gymnastics in 2008 was based primarily on the 2015 World Artistic Gymnastics Championships. The top 8 teams at the world championships could send a full team of 5 gymnasts to the Olympics. The next 8 teams (#9 through #16) competed in the 2012 Gymnastics Olympic Test Event, with the top 4 of those teams also qualifying a team of 5 gymnasts for the Olympics. The individual apparatus medalists from the World Championships also qualified, if their nation had not already qualified a team. There were places reserved for host country and continental representation, and the Tripartite Commission made an invitation. The quota of 98 gymnasts was then filled through the individual all-around rankings at the Test Event, with each nation able to qualify only one gymnast in that manner (though this one gymnast could be added to the world championship apparatus medalists—for example, Romania qualified Marian Drăgulescu as silver medalist in the vault and Andrei Muntean through the Test Event).

== Competition format ==
The top 8 qualifiers in the qualification phase (limit two per NOC), based on combined score of each apparatus, advanced to the individual all-around final. The finalists performed on each apparatus again. Qualification scores were then ignored, with only final round scores counting.

== Schedule ==
All times are Brasília Time (UTC-03:00)

Date	Time	Round
Wednesday, 6 August 2016	11:00	Qualifying
Friday, 15 August 2016	14:00	Final

== Results ==
=== Qualifying ===
The gymnasts who ranked in the top eight qualified for the final. In the event of there being more than two gymnasts from same NOC, only the first two ranked among them would qualify for the final, with the next best ranked gymnast qualifying instead.

Two qualified gymnasts withdrew, resulting in the first two reserves (9th and 10th place in the qualifying) advancing to the final. Samir Aït Saïd was forced to scratch from the final after breaking his leg during the qualification round on vault. Yuri van Gelder was removed by the Dutch NOC when he returned to Olympic Village under influence of alcohol after a night out. They were replaced by Danny Pinheiro Rodrigues and Igor Radivilov.

=== Final ===
Rank	Gymnast	Nation	D Score	E Score	Pen.	Total
1st place, gold medalist(s)	Eleftherios Petrounias	Greece	6.800	9.200		16.000
2nd place, silver medalist(s)	Arthur Zanetti	Brazil	6.800	8.966		15.766
3rd place, bronze medalist(s)	Denis Ablyazin	Russia	6.800	8.900		15.700
4	Liu Yang	China	6.900	8.700		15.600
5	Igor Radivilov	Ukraine	6.800	8.666		15.466
6	You Hao	China	7.000	8.400		15.400
7	Danny Pinheiro Rodrigues	France	6.900	8.333		15.233
8	Dennis Goossens	Belgium	6.600	8.333		14.933
