= Gymnastics at the 2024 Summer Olympics – Men's rings =

Olympic gymnastics event

Men's rings at the Games of the XXXIII Olympiad
- Olympic artistic gymnastics
- Venue: Accor Arena
- Date: 27 July 2024 (qualifying); 4 August 2024 (final)
- Competitors: 8 from 7 nations

Medalists
1st place, gold medalist(s)		Liu Yang	China
2nd place, silver medalist(s)		Zou Jingyuan	China
3rd place, bronze medalist(s)		Eleftherios Petrounias	Greece

The men's rings event at the 2024 Summer Olympics was held on 27 July and 4 August 2024 at the Accor Arena (referred to as the Bercy Arena due to IOC sponsorship rules).

== Competition Format ==
The top 8 qualifiers (limit two per NOC) for rings advanced to the apparatus finals.

== Schedule ==
The competition was held over two days, 27 July and 4 August. The qualifying round (for all men's gymnastics events) was on the first day with the apparatus final on the second day.

Date	Time	Round	Subdivision
27 July	11:00	Qualification	Subdivision 1
27 July	15:30	Qualification	Subdivision 2
27 July	20:00	Qualification	Subdivision 3
4 August	15:00	Final	–
All times are Central European Summer Time (UTC+2)

== Qualification ==
Rank	Gymnast	D Score	E Score	Pen.	Total	Qual.
1	Zou Jingyuan (CHN)	6.4	8.900		15.300	Q
2	Liu Yang (CHN)	6.4	8.833		15.233	Q
3	Samir Aït Saïd (FRA)	6.1	8.866		14.966	Q
4	Glen Cuyle (BEL)	6.3	8.600		14.900	Q
5	Adem Asil (TUR)	6.4	8.466		14.866	Q
6	Eleftherios Petrounias (GRE)	6.3	8.500		14.800	Q
7	Vahagn Davtyan (ARM)	6.0	8.733		14.733	Q
8	Harry Hepworth (GBR)	6.1	8.600		14.700	Q
9	Zhang Boheng (CHN)	6.0	8.666		14.666	–
10	Asher Hong (USA)	6.0	8.633		14.633	R1
11	İbrahim Çolak (TUR)	5.9	8.633		14.533	R2
12	Tanigawa Wataru (JPN)	6.0	8.466		14.466	R3

Reserves

The reserves for the men's rings final were:

1. Asher Hong (USA)
2. İbrahim Çolak (TUR)
3. Tanigawa Wataru (JPN)

Only two gymnasts from each country may advance to the event final. Therefore, Zhang Boheng (CHN) would be excluded as a reserve unless another Chinese gymnast were to drop out.

== Final ==
Rank	Gymnast	D Score	E Score	Pen.	Total
1st place, gold medalist(s)	Liu Yang (CHN)	6.4	8.900		15.300
2nd place, silver medalist(s)	Zou Jingyuan (CHN)	6.4	8.833		15.233
3rd place, bronze medalist(s)	Eleftherios Petrounias (GRE)	6.3	8.800		15.100
4	Samir Aït Saïd (FRA)	6.1	8.900		15.000
5	Adem Asil (TUR)	6.4	8.566		14.966
6	Vahagn Davtyan (ARM)	6.0	8.866		14.866
7	Harry Hepworth (GBR)	6.1	8.700		14.800
8	Glen Cuyle (BEL)	6.3	7.533		13.833
