= 2017 World Artistic Gymnastics Championships =

Gymnastics competition

2017 World Artistic Gymnastics Championships

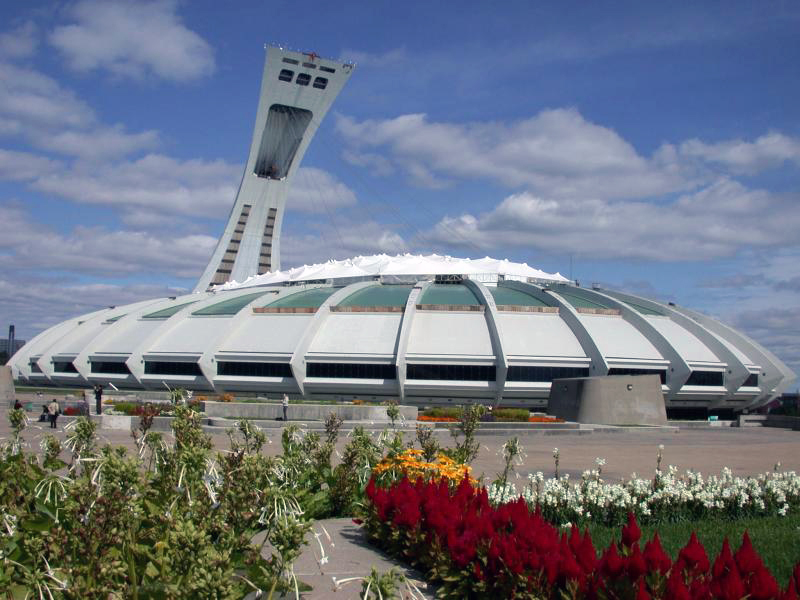
- Venue: Montreal Olympic Stadium
- Location: Montreal, Quebec, Canada
- Start date: October 2, 2017
- End date: October 8, 2017

The 2017 Artistic Gymnastics World Championships was the forty-seventh edition of the Artistic Gymnastics World Championships. The competition was held from October 2–8, 2017, at the Olympic Stadium in Montreal, Quebec, Canada.

The event marked the first time since 2003 that the Championships had been held in North America. Montreal was also the host of the 1985 World Championships and the 1976 Summer Olympics. The event was part of Montreal's 375th anniversary and Canada's 150th anniversary celebrations, both of which were in fall of 2017.

== Competition schedule ==
All times are EDT (UTC−4).

Date	Sessions	Time	Subdivisions
Monday, October 2	Opening ceremony		
Monday, October 2	Men's Qualifications	9:30 AM – 1:00 PM	Subdivision 1 MAG
Monday, October 2	Men's Qualifications	2:00 PM – 5:00 PM	Subdivision 2 MAG
Monday, October 2	Men's Qualifications	6:00 PM – 9:00 PM	Subdivision 3 MAG
Tuesday, October 3	Men's and Women's Qualifications	9:30 AM – 1:00 PM	Subdivision 4 MAG
Tuesday, October 3	Men's and Women's Qualifications	4:00 PM – 6:00 PM	Subdivision 1 WAG
Tuesday, October 3	Men's and Women's Qualifications	7:00 PM – 9:00 PM	Subdivision 2 WAG
Wednesday, October 4	Women's Qualifications	1:00 PM – 3:30 PM	Subdivision 3 WAG
Wednesday, October 4	Women's Qualifications	4:00 PM – 6:00 PM	Subdivision 4 WAG
Wednesday, October 4	Women's Qualifications	7:00 PM – 9:00 PM	Subdivision 5 WAG
Thursday, October 5	Men's Individual All-Around Final	7:00 PM	-
Friday, October 6	Women's Individual All-Around Final	7:00 PM	-
Saturday, October 7	Men's and Women's Apparatus Finals	1:00 PM	MAG: Floor, Pommel horse, Rings
Saturday, October 7	Men's and Women's Apparatus Finals	1:00 PM	WAG: Vault, Uneven bars
Sunday, October 8	Men's and Women's Apparatus Finals	1:00 PM	MAG: Vault, Parallel bars, Horizontal bar
Sunday, October 8	Men's and Women's Apparatus Finals	1:00 PM	WAG: Beam, Floor
Sunday, October 8	Closing ceremony		

== Medalists ==
Event	Gold	Silver	Bronze
Men
Individual all-around	Xiao Ruoteng; China	Lin Chaopan; China	Kenzō Shirai; Japan
Floor	Kenzō Shirai; Japan	Artem Dolgopyat; Israel	Yul Moldauer; United States
Pommel horse	Max Whitlock; Great Britain	David Belyavskiy; Russia	Xiao Ruoteng; China
Rings	Eleftherios Petrounias; Greece	Denis Ablyazin; Russia	Liu Yang; China
Vault	Kenzō Shirai; Japan	Igor Radivilov; Ukraine	Kim Han-sol; South Korea
Parallel bars	Zou Jingyuan; China	Oleg Verniaiev; Ukraine	David Belyavskiy; Russia
Horizontal bar	Tin Srbić; Croatia	Epke Zonderland; Netherlands	Bart Deurloo; Netherlands
Women
Individual all-around	Morgan Hurd; United States	Ellie Black; Canada	Elena Eremina; Russia
Vault	Maria Paseka; Russia	Jade Carey; United States	Giulia Steingruber; Switzerland
Uneven bars	Fan Yilin; China	Elena Eremina; Russia	Nina Derwael; Belgium
Balance beam	Pauline Schäfer; Germany	Morgan Hurd; United States	Tabea Alt; Germany
Floor	Mai Murakami; Japan	Jade Carey; United States	Claudia Fragapane; Great Britain

== Overall standings ==
=== Overall medal table ===
Rank	Nation	Gold	Silver	Bronze	Total
1	China (CHN)	3	1	2	6
2	Japan (JPN)	3	0	1	4
3	Russia (RUS)	1	3	2	6
4	United States (USA)	1	3	1	5
5	Germany (GER)	1	0	1	2
5	Great Britain (GBR)	1	0	1	2
7	Croatia (CRO)	1	0	0	1
7	Greece (GRE)	1	0	0	1
9	Ukraine (UKR)	0	2	0	2
10	Netherlands (NED)	0	1	1	2
11	Canada (CAN)	0	1	0	1
11	Israel (ISR)	0	1	0	1
13	Belgium (BEL)	0	0	1	1
13	South Korea (KOR)	0	0	1	1
13	Switzerland (SUI)	0	0	1	1
Totals (15 entries)		12	12	12	36

=== Men's medal table ===
Rank	Nation	Gold	Silver	Bronze	Total
1	China (CHN)	2	1	2	5
2	Japan (JPN)	2	0	1	3
3	Croatia (CRO)	1	0	0	1
3	Great Britain (GBR)	1	0	0	1
3	Greece (GRE)	1	0	0	1
6	Russia (RUS)	0	2	1	3
7	Ukraine (UKR)	0	2	0	2
8	Netherlands (NED)	0	1	1	2
9	Israel (ISR)	0	1	0	1
10	South Korea (KOR)	0	0	1	1
10	United States (USA)	0	0	1	1
Totals (11 entries)		7	7	7	21

=== Women's medal table ===
Rank	Nation	Gold	Silver	Bronze	Total
1	United States (USA)	1	3	0	4
2	Russia (RUS)	1	1	1	3
3	Germany (GER)	1	0	1	2
4	China (CHN)	1	0	0	1
4	Japan (JPN)	1	0	0	1
6	Canada (CAN)	0	1	0	1
7	Belgium (BEL)	0	0	1	1
7	Great Britain (GBR)	0	0	1	1
7	Switzerland (SUI)	0	0	1	1
Totals (9 entries)		5	5	5	15

== Men's results ==
=== Individual all-around ===
Oldest and youngest competitors

	Name	Country	Date of birth	Age
Youngest	Nikita Nagornyy	Russia	February 12, 1997	20 years, 7 months and 23 days
Oldest	David Belyavskiy	Russia	February 23, 1992	25 years, 7 months and 12 days

Position	Gymnast	Floor (gymnastics)	Pommel horse	Rings (gymnastics)	Vault (gymnastics)	Parallel bars	Horizontal bar	Total
1st place, gold medalist(s)	(China) Xiao Ruoteng	14.433	14.800	13.800	14.900	14.600	14.400	86.933
2nd place, silver medalist(s)	(China) Lin Chaopan	14.516	14.266	13.666	14.900	14.800	14.300	86.448
3rd place, bronze medalist(s)	(Japan) Kenzō Shirai	15.733	13.433	13.666	15.000	14.633	13.966	86.431
4	(Russia) David Belyavskiy	14.066	14.900	14.100	14.783	15.266	13.200	86.315
5	(Cuba) Manrique Larduet	13.933	13.733	14.133	14.966	14.933	14.333	86.031
6	(United Kingdom) Nile Wilson	14.333	13.666	14.300	14.100	14.500	14.433	85.332
7	(United States) Yul Moldauer	14.566	14.000	14.066	14.500	14.533	13.333	84.998
8	(Ukraine) Oleg Verniaiev	13.766	13.333	14.566	14.833	14.966	12.533	83.997
9	(Turkey) Ahmet Önder	14.133	12.933	13.833	14.533	14.933	13.466	83.831
10	(Russia) Nikita Nagornyy	14.500	13.866	14.466	14.800	14.541	11.066	83.239
11	(Colombia) Jossimar Calvo	13.866	13.800	13.333	13.866	14.600	13.566	83.031
12	(Switzerland) Pablo Brägger	14.233	13.255	13.600	14.433	12.700	14.500	82.732
13	(Armenia) Artur Davtyan	13.333	13.400	14.200	14.900	13.766	12.733	82.332
14	(South Korea) Bae Ga-ram	13.000	13.533	12.866	14.133	13.600	13.400	80.532
15	(Brazil) Caio Souza	13.900	11.566	14.166	14.500	14.266	12.133	80.531
16	(Cyprus) Marios Georgiou	12.500	12.300	13.500	14.000	14.100	13.833	80.233
17	(Lithuania) Robert Tvorogal	12.900	12.866	13.133	13.900	14.100	13.333	80.232
18	(Germany) Philipp Herder	14.133	12.833	13.500	13.000	14.100	12.600	80.166
19	(Switzerland) Eddy Yusof	13.566	11.633	13.766	13.433	14.366	13.400	80.164
20	(Turkey) Ferhat Arıcan	11.733	13.525	12.900	14.266	14.683	12.933	80.040
21	(Canada) Zachary Clay	13.133	13.566	13.100	14.100	13.100	12.900	79.899
22	(Lithuania) Tomas Kuzmickas	14.266	12.866	11.700	13.866	13.633	13.333	79.664
23	(Mexico) Kevin Cerda	13.333	12.266	12.400	13.733	12.366	12.833	76.931
24	(Spain) Joel Plata Rodríguez	13.666	10.633	13.500	13.633	13.400	11.866	76.698

=== Floor ===
Due to a dead spot on the floor in the last subdivision of qualifications that allowed a rotation of gymnasts to redo their floor routines, Bram Verhofstad of the Netherlands bumped out the original eighth-place qualifier Tomás González of Chile. After an appeal by the Chilean Gymnastics Federation, González was reinstated. As a result, there were nine gymnasts in the final.

Oldest and youngest competitors

	Name	Country	Date of birth	Age
Youngest	Milad Karimi	Kazakhstan	June 21, 1999	18 years, 3 months and 16 days
Oldest	Tomás González	Chile	November 22, 1985	31 years, 10 months and 15 days

Position	Gymnast	D Score	E Score	Penalty	Total
1st place, gold medalist(s)	(Japan) Kenzō Shirai	7.200	8.433		15.633
2nd place, silver medalist(s)	(Israel) Artem Dolgopyat	6.500	8.033		14.533
3rd place, bronze medalist(s)	(United States) Yul Moldauer	5.800	8.700		14.500
4	(Netherlands) Bram Verhofstad	6.100	8.233		14.333
5	(Chile) Tomás González	6.000	8.266		14.266
6	(United States) Donnell Whittenburg	6.400	7.766		14.166
7	(Cuba) Manrique Larduet	6.000	8.100		14.100
8	(South Korea) Kim Han-sol	6.400	7.700		14.100
9	(Kazakhstan) Milad Karimi	6.100	7.166		13.266

=== Pommel horse ===
Oldest and youngest competitors

	Name	Country	Date of birth	Age
Youngest	Weng Hao	China	March 21, 1998	19 years, 6 months and 16 days
Oldest	Sašo Bertoncelj	Slovenia	July 16, 1984	33 years, 2 months and 21 days

Position	Gymnast	D Score	E Score	Penalty	Total
1st place, gold medalist(s)	(United Kingdom) Max Whitlock	6.900	8.541		15.441
2nd place, silver medalist(s)	(Russia) David Belyavskiy	6.400	8.700		15.100
3rd place, bronze medalist(s)	(China) Xiao Ruoteng	6.400	8.666		15.066
4	(United States) Alexander Naddour	6.300	8.450		14.750
5	(Armenia) Harutyun Merdinyan	6.200	8.500		14.700
6	(China) Weng Hao	6.000	8.500		14.500
7	(Ukraine) Oleg Verniaiev	6.400	7.300		13.700
8	(Slovenia) Sašo Bertoncelj	6.000	6.966		12.966

=== Rings ===
Oldest and youngest competitors

	Name	Country	Date of birth	Age
Youngest	Courtney Tulloch	Great Britain	October 6, 1995	22 years and 1 day
Oldest	Samir Aït Saïd	France	November 1, 1989	27 years, 11 months and 6 days

Position	Gymnast	D Score	E Score	Penalty	Total
1st place, gold medalist(s)	(Greece) Eleftherios Petrounias	6.300	9.133		15.433
2nd place, silver medalist(s)	(Russia) Denis Ablyazin	6.300	9.033		15.333
3rd place, bronze medalist(s)	(China) Liu Yang	6.300	8.966		15.266
4	(France) Samir Aït Saïd	6.200	9.058		15.258
5	(Turkey) İbrahim Çolak	6.200	8.866		15.066
6	(Ukraine) Igor Radivilov	6.300	8.633		14.933
7	(Brazil) Arthur Zanetti	6.200	8.700		14.900
8	(United Kingdom) Courtney Tulloch	6.400	8.133		14.533

=== Vault ===
Top qualifier Yang Hak-seon of South Korea withdrew with a hamstring injury and was replaced by first reserve Artur Dalaloyan of Russia in the final.

Oldest and youngest competitors

	Name	Country	Date of birth	Age
Youngest	Zachari Hrimeche	France	January 17, 1997	20 years, 8 months and 21 days
Oldest	Marian Drăgulescu	Romania	December 18, 1980	36 years, 9 months and 20 days

Position	Gymnast	Vault 1				Vault 2				Total
Position	Gymnast	D Score	E Score	Pen.	Score 1	D Score	E Score	Pen.	Score 2	Total
1st place, gold medalist(s)	(Japan) Kenzō Shirai	5.600	9.600		15.200	5.200	9.400		14.600	14.900
2nd place, silver medalist(s)	(Ukraine) Igor Radivilov	5.600	9.433		15.033	5.600	9.166		14.766	14.899
3rd place, bronze medalist(s)	(South Korea) Kim Han-sol	5.600	9.366		14.966	5.200	9.366		14.566	14.766
4	(Romania) Marian Drăgulescu	5.600	9.100		14.700	5.400	9.333		14.733	14.716
5	(Guatemala) Jorge Vega	5.600	9.200	-0.100	14.700	5.200	9.508		14.708	14.704
6	(Japan) Keisuke Asato	6.000	8.866	-0.100	14.766	5.600	8.333		13.933	14.349
7	(France) Zachari Hrimeche	5.600	8.166	-0.200	13.566	5.600	9.000		14.600	14.083
8	(Russia) Artur Dalaloyan	5.600	8.900	-0.300	14.200	5.600	8.133		13.733	13.966

=== Parallel bars ===
Oldest and youngest competitors

	Name	Country	Date of birth	Age
Youngest	Zou Jingyuan	China	January 3, 1998	19 years, 9 months and 5 days
Oldest	Marcel Nguyen	Germany	September 8, 1987	30 years and 1 month

Position	Gymnast	D Score	E Score	Penalty	Total
1st place, gold medalist(s)	(China) Zou Jingyuan	6.800	9.100		15.900
2nd place, silver medalist(s)	(Ukraine) Oleg Verniaiev	6.700	9.133		15.833
3rd place, bronze medalist(s)	(Russia) David Belyavskiy	6.400	8.866		15.266
4	(Cuba) Manrique Larduet	6.400	8.766		15.166
5	(China) Lin Chaopan	6.400	8.733		15.133
6	(Switzerland) Pablo Brägger	6.400	8.333		14.733
7	(Germany) Marcel Nguyen	6.200	8.500		14.700
8	(Turkey) Ferhat Arıcan	6.300	7.800		14.100

=== Horizontal bar ===
With the successful completion of the double-twisting straight Kovac (aka double-twisting Cassina or Bretschneider straight) in competition by Hidetaka Miyachi of Japan (despite a fall on a different element in his routine) during the horizontal bar individual event final, the skill—now officially called the Miyachi on the horizontal bar—has been automatically named after him, the only element currently in men's artistic gymnastics to be assigned the new and highest difficulty score of I (0.9).

Oldest and youngest competitors

	Name	Country	Date of birth	Age
Youngest	Tin Srbić	Croatia	September 11, 1996	21 years and 27 days
Oldest	Epke Zonderland	Netherlands	April 16, 1986	31 years, 5 months and 22 days

Position	Gymnast	D Score	E Score	Penalty	Total
1st place, gold medalist(s)	(Croatia) Tin Srbić	6.400	8.033		14.433
2nd place, silver medalist(s)	(Netherlands) Epke Zonderland	6.500	7.733		14.233
3rd place, bronze medalist(s)	(Netherlands) Bart Deurloo	6.200	8.000		14.200
4	(Switzerland) Pablo Brägger	6.500	7.233		13.733
5	(Japan) Hidetaka Miyachi	6.700	7.033		13.733
6	(Russia) David Belyavskiy	5.400	8.133		13.533
7	(Cuba) Randy Lerú	6.000	7.100		13.100
8	(Switzerland) Oliver Hegi	5.800	6.933		12.733

== Women's results ==
=== Individual all-around ===
Great Britain's Alice Kinsella withdrew before the final due to an ankle injury sustained in qualifications and was replaced by first reserve Lee Eun-ju of South Korea. Second-place qualifier Ragan Smith of the United States injured her ankle during warm-ups moments before the first event and withdrew. Second reserve Ioana Crișan of Romania replaced Smith in the top group, as there was no time to re-seed due to Smith's late withdrawal.

Oldest and youngest competitors

	Name	Country	Date of birth	Age
Youngest	Ioana Crișan	Romania	October 15, 2001	15 years, 11 months and 21 days
Oldest	Elisabeth Seitz	Germany	November 4, 1993	23 years, 11 months and 2 days

Position	Gymnast	Vault (gymnastics)	Uneven bars	Balance beam	Floor (gymnastics)	Total
1st place, gold medalist(s)	(United States) Morgan Hurd	14.533	14.300	12.666	13.733	55.232
2nd place, silver medalist(s)	(Canada) Ellie Black	14.600	14.233	12.866	13.433	55.132
3rd place, bronze medalist(s)	(Russia) Elena Eremina	13.866	14.200	13.133	13.600	54.799
4	(Japan) Mai Murakami	14.666	13.800	12.000	14.233	54.699
5	(France) Mélanie de Jesus dos Santos	14.466	14.000	12.433	13.233	54.132
6	(Japan) Aiko Sugihara	14.033	13.533	12.566	13.833	53.965
7	(Switzerland) Giulia Steingruber	14.700	12.933	12.400	13.633	53.666
8	(Belgium) Nina Derwael	13.533	14.966	11.633	13.366	53.498
9	(Germany) Elisabeth Seitz	13.700	14.566	12.433	12.766	53.465
10	(Germany) Tabea Alt	13.866	13.600	13.300	12.633	53.399
11	(Belgium) Rune Hermans	13.300	13.900	12.033	13.066	52.299
12	(Italy) Lara Mori	13.433	13.466	12.266	13.000	52.165
13	(Australia) Georgia Godwin	13.266	13.500	12.366	12.900	52.032
14	(Ukraine) Diana Varinska	13.433	14.500	11.366	12.700	51.999
15	(Canada) Brooklyn Moors	12.966	13.200	12.266	13.533	51.965
16	(Russia) Angelina Melnikova	13.733	13.775	12.433	11.400	51.341
17	(United Kingdom) Amy Tinkler	14.400	11.000	12.166	13.333	50.899
18	(Portugal) Ana Filipa Martins	13.166	13.533	12.233	11.933	50.865
19	(China) Wang Yan	14.233	13.366	10.200	12.633	50.432
20	(Spain) Ana Pérez	12.833	13.733	10.100	12.600	49.266
21	(France) Marine Boyer	13.766	12.066	10.566	12.833	49.231
22	(South Korea) Lee Eun-ju	13.233	13.200	11.500	11.266	49.199
23	(Romania) Ioana Crișan	13.566	10.766	11.600	13.033	48.965
24	(Brazil) Thaís Fidélis	13.533	11.066	10.600	13.566	48.765

=== Vault ===
Oldest and youngest competitors

	Name	Country	Date of birth	Age
Youngest	Shallon Olsen	Canada	July 10, 2000	17 years, 2 months and 27 days
Oldest	Oksana Chusovitina	Uzbekistan	June 19, 1975	42 years, 3 months and 18 days

Position	Gymnast	Vault 1				Vault 2				Total
Position	Gymnast	D Score	E Score	Pen.	Score 1	D Score	E Score	Pen.	Score 2	Total
1st place, gold medalist(s)	(Russia) Maria Paseka	6.000	8.700		14.700	5.800	9.200		15.000	14.850
2nd place, silver medalist(s)	(United States) Jade Carey	5.800	9.000		14.800	5.600	9.133		14.733	14.766
3rd place, bronze medalist(s)	(Switzerland) Giulia Steingruber	5.800	8.933	-0.100	14.633	5.400	8.900		14.300	14.466
4	(Canada) Ellie Black	5.400	9.166		14.566	5.200	9.066		14.266	14.416
5	(Uzbekistan) Oksana Chusovitina	5.400	9.033		14.433	5.200	9.100		14.300	14.366
6	(China) Wang Yan	5.600	8.900		14.500	5.800	8.500	-0.100	14.200	14.350
7	(Canada) Shallon Olsen	5.800	7.833	-0.100	13.533	6.000	8.933		14.933	14.233
8	(Japan) Sae Miyakawa	5.800	8.700		14.500	5.400	7.700		13.100	13.800

=== Uneven bars ===
Nina Derwael of Belgium is the first gymnast from her country to make an event final and her bronze was the first-ever medal for Belgium.

Oldest and youngest competitors

	Name	Country	Date of birth	Age
Youngest	Elena Eremina	Russia	July 29, 2001	16 years, 2 months and 8 days
Oldest	Elisabeth Seitz	Germany	November 4, 1993	23 years, 11 months and 3 days

Position	Gymnast	D Score	E Score	Penalty	Total
1st place, gold medalist(s)	(China) Fan Yilin	6.500	8.666		15.166
2nd place, silver medalist(s)	(Russia) Elena Eremina	6.300	8.800		15.100
3rd place, bronze medalist(s)	(Belgium) Nina Derwael	6.300	8.733		15.033
4	(Russia) Anastasia Ilyankova	6.200	8.700		14.900
5	(Germany) Elisabeth Seitz	6.100	8.666		14.766
6	(Ukraine) Diana Varinska	6.000	8.583		14.583
7	(China) Luo Huan	6.200	8.366		14.566
8	(United States) Ashton Locklear	5.400	7.366		12.766

=== Balance beam ===
Pauline Schäfer won the first-ever World Championships balance beam gold medal for Germany.

Oldest and youngest competitors

	Name	Country	Date of birth	Age
Youngest	Elena Eremina	Russia	July 29, 2001	16 years, 2 months and 9 days
Oldest	Ellie Black	Canada	September 8, 1995	22 years and 1 month

Position	Gymnast	D Score	E Score	Penalty	Total
1st place, gold medalist(s)	(Germany) Pauline Schäfer	5.500	8.033		13.533
2nd place, silver medalist(s)	(United States) Morgan Hurd	5.700	7.800	-0.100	13.400
3rd place, bronze medalist(s)	(Germany) Tabea Alt	5.700	7.600		13.300
4	(Japan) Mai Murakami	5.400	7.666		13.066
5	(Russia) Elena Eremina	5.400	7.566		12.966
6	(Japan) Asuka Teramoto	5.600	7.366		12.966
7	(China) Liu Tingting	5.500	7.366	-0.100	12.766
8	(Canada) Ellie Black	5.700	6.700		12.400

=== Floor ===
Top qualifier Ragan Smith of the United States withdrew after sustaining an ankle injury in warm-ups for the all-around final earlier in the week; she was replaced by first reserve Ellie Black of Canada in the floor final. Mai Murakami won Japan's first-ever gold for women on the event.

Oldest and youngest competitors

	Name	Country	Date of birth	Age
Youngest	Thaís Fidélis	Brazil	July 23, 2001	16 years, 2 months and 15 days
Oldest	Vanessa Ferrari	Italy	November 10, 1990	26 years, 10 months and 28 days

Position	Gymnast	D Score	E Score	Penalty	Total
1st place, gold medalist(s)	(Japan) Mai Murakami	5.900	8.333		14.233
2nd place, silver medalist(s)	(United States) Jade Carey	5.700	8.500		14.200
3rd place, bronze medalist(s)	(United Kingdom) Claudia Fragapane	5.600	8.333		13.933
4	(Brazil) Thaís Fidélis	5.500	8.166		13.666
5	(Canada) Brooklyn Moors	5.200	8.450		13.650
6	(Italy) Lara Mori	5.400	7.866		13.266
7	(Canada) Ellie Black	5.300	7.900	-0.300	12.900
8	(Italy) Vanessa Ferrari	2.000	8.233	-6.300	3.933 (Note: Vanessa Ferrari fell on her second tumbling pass, tearing her Achilles tendon. She was unable to complete her routine.)

== Qualification ==
=== Men's results ===
==== Individual all-around ====
Rank	Name	Floor (gymnastics)	Pommel horse	Rings (gymnastics)	Vault (gymnastics)	Parallel bars	Horizontal bar	Total	Qualification
1	(Cuba) Manrique Larduet	14.466	14.200	14.200	14.900	15.200	13.733	86.699	Q
2	(China) Xiao Ruoteng	14.166	14.866	13.933	14.766	14.800	13.766	86.297	Q
3	(Russia) David Belyavskiy	13.933	14.666	14.133	13.833	15.066	14.208	85.839	Q
4	(Japan) Kenzō Shirai	15.766	13.233	13.766	15.233	14.666	13.033	85.697	Q
5	(Ukraine) Oleg Verniaiev	13.233	14.733	13.800	14.833	15.466	13.366	85.431	Q
6	(China) Lin Chaopan	14.100	13.833	13.783	14.333	15.000	13.466	85.515	Q
7	(United States) Yul Moldauer	14.700	13.066	14.300	14.566	14.633	13.066	85.331	Q
8	(United Kingdom) Nile Wilson	14.133	12.900	14.200	14.466	14.200	13.933	83.832	Q
9	(Switzerland) Pablo Brägger	13.566	13.266	13.200	14.533	14.800	14.433	83.798	Q
10	(Turkey) Ahmet Önder	14.133	12.066	13.800	14.800	14.533	13.466	82.798	Q
11	(Russia) Nikita Nagornyy	13.666	13.800	14.566	12.766	13.900	13.900	82.598	Q
12	(Colombia) Jossimar Calvo	13.866	13.733	13.100	14.100	13.800	13.800	82.399	Q
13	(Turkey) Ferhat Arıcan	13.666	13.600	13.066	14.400	14.933	12.633	82.298	Q
14	(Brazil) Caio Souza	13.566	12.700	14.200	14.483	14.433	12.166	81.548	Q
15	(Armenia) Artur Davtyan	13.233	13.866	14.166	13.600	13.733	12.766	81.364	Q
16	(Cyprus) Marios Georgiou	12.733	14.333	12.966	14.000	14.100	13.100	81.232	Q
17	(Germany) Philipp Herder	13.766	13.033	13.200	14.100	13.866	11.866	79.831	Q
18	(Mexico) Kevin Cerda	14.000	12.633	12.900	13.900	12.366	13.433	79.232	Q
19	(Switzerland) Eddy Yusof	13.933	11.333	14.133	14.266	12.833	12.566	79.064	Q
20	(Lithuania) Tomas Kuzmickas	13.900	12.633	11.666	13.966	13.966	12.866	78.997	Q
21	(Lithuania) Robert Tvorogal	13.733	12.533	12.866	13.833	13.566	12.433	78.964	Q
22	(South Korea) Bae Ga-ram	13.400	12.200	13.166	14.300	12.000	13.633	78.699	Q
23	(Canada) Zachary Clay	12.500	13.066	13.700	13.300	13.200	12.866	78.632	Q
24	(Spain) Joel Plata Rodríguez	13.733	10.666	12.933	13.600	13.900	12.600	77.432	Q
25	(Norway) Pietro Giachino	13.200	13.666	12.100	12.900	12.300	13.133	77.299	R1
26	(Jamaica) Reiss Beckford	13.466	11.933	13.500	13.533	13.766	11.033	77.231	R2
27	(Belarus) Dzianis Sanuvonh	13.300	12.000	11.900	14.366	13.766	11.400	76.732	R3
28	(Italy) Lorenzo Galli	12.533	12.133	12.133	13.700	13.200	12.800	76.499	R4

==== Floor ====
Rank	Name	Difficulty	Execution	Penalty	Total	Qualification
1	(Japan) Kenzō Shirai	7.200	8.566		15.766	Q
2	(United States) Donnell Whittenburg	6.400	8.633		15.033	Q
3	(United States) Yul Moldauer	5.800	8.900		14.700	Q
4	(Israel) Artem Dolgopyat	6.500	8.366	0.200	14.666	Q
5	(South Korea) Kim Han-sol	6.400	8.266		14.666	Q
6	(United States) Eddie Penev	6.200	8.433		14.633	-
7	(Cuba) Manrique Larduet	6.000	8.466		14.466	Q
8	(Netherlands) Bram Verhofstad	6.100	8.333		14.433	Q
9	(Kazakhstan) Milad Karimi	6.100	8.225		14.325	Q
10	(Chile) Tomás González	6.200	8.166	0.100	14.266	Q
11	(China) Xiao Ruoteng	5.900	8.266		14.166	R2
12	(United Kingdom) Nile Wilson	5.500	8.633		14.133	R3

==== Pommel horse ====
Rank	Name	Difficulty	Execution	Penalty	Total	Qualification
1	(United Kingdom) Max Whitlock	6.800	8.500		15.300	Q
2	(China) Weng Hao	6.500	8.533		15.033	Q
3	(United States) Alexander Naddour	6.400	8.566		14.966	Q
4	(China) Xiao Ruoteng	6.100	8.766		14.866	Q
5	(Ukraine) Oleg Verniaiev	6.600	8.133		14.733	Q
6	(Russia) David Belyavskiy	6.400	8.266		14.666	Q
7	(Slovenia) Sašo Bertoncelj	6.100	8.425		14.525	Q
8	(Armenia) Harutyun Merdinyan	6.200	8.233		14.433	Q
9	(Croatia) Filip Ude	6.000	8.400		14.400	R1
10	(Belarus) Andrey Likhovitskiy	6.300	8.066		14.366	R2
11	(Chinese Taipei) Hsu Ping-chien	5.700	8.633		14.333	R3

==== Rings ====
Rank	Name	Difficulty	Execution	Penalty	Total	Qualification
1	(Greece) Eleftherios Petrounias	6.300	9.100		15.400	Q
2	(Russia) Denis Ablyazin	6.300	9.033		15.333	Q
3	(Turkey) İbrahim Çolak	6.200	8.833		15.033	Q
4	(France) Samir Aït Saïd	6.200	8.766		14.966	Q
5	(China) Liu Yang	6.300	8.500		14.800	Q
6	(United Kingdom) Courtney Tulloch	6.400	8.366		14.766	Q
7	(Ukraine) Igor Radivilov	6.300	8.433		14.733	Q
8	(Brazil) Arthur Zanetti	6.200	8.500		14.700	Q
9	(United States) Alexander Naddour	6.000	8.633		14.633	R1
10	(United States) Donnell Whittenburg	6.100	8.533		14.633	R2
11	(Russia) Nikita Nagornyy	6.000	8.566		14.566	R3

==== Vault ====
Rank	Name	D Score	E Score	Pen.	Score 1	D Score	E Score	Pen.	Score 2	Total	Qualification
Rank	Name	Vault 1				Vault 2				Total	Qualification
1	(South Korea) Yang Hak-seon	6.000	9.600		15.600	5.600	9.366		14.966	15.283	Q
2	(Japan) Kenzō Shirai	5.600	9.633		15.233	5.200	9.466		14.666	14.949	Q
3	(Romania) Marian Drăgulescu	5.600	9.300		14.900	5.400	9.433		14.833	14.866	Q
4	(Japan) Keisuke Asato	6.000	8.633	0.100	14.533	5.600	9.300		14.900	14.716	Q
5	(France) Zachari Hrimeche	5.600	8.933		14.533	5.600	9.266		14.866	14.699	Q
6	(Ukraine) Igor Radivilov	5.600	9.100		14.700	5.600	9.141	0.100	14.641	14.670	Q
7	(South Korea) Kim Han-sol	5.600	9.266		14.866	5.200	9.233		14.433	14.649	Q
8	(Guatemala) Jorge Vega López	5.600	9.166		14.766	5.200	9.366	0.100	14.466	14.616	Q
9	(Russia) Artur Dalaloyan	5.600	9.183	0.100	14.683	5.600	9.033	0.100	14.533	14.608	R1
10	(United States) Eddie Penev	5.200	9.333		14.533	5.400	9.200		14.600	14.566	R2
11	(Ukraine) Oleg Verniaiev	5.600	9.233		14.833	5.600	8.500		14.100	14.466	R3

==== Parallel bars ====
Rank	Name	Difficulty	Execution	Penalty	Total	Qualification
1	(Ukraine) Oleg Verniaiev	6.700	8.766		15.466	Q
2	(China) Zou Jingyuan	6.600	8.633		15.233	Q
3	(Cuba) Manrique Larduet	6.400	8.800		15.200	Q
4	(Russia) David Belyavskiy	6.400	8.800		15.200	Q
5	(China) Lin Chaopan	6.400	8.600		15.000	Q
6	(Turkey) Ferhat Arıcan	6.300	8.633		14.933	Q
7	(Germany) Marcel Nguyen	6.500	8.433		14.933	Q
8	(China) Xiao Ruoteng	6.000	8.800		14.800	-
9	(Switzerland) Pablo Brägger	6.400	8.400		14.800	Q
10	(United States) Donnell Whittenburg	6.300	8.466		14.766	R1
11	(Japan) Wataru Tanigawa	6.000	8.733		14.733	R2
12	(Vietnam) Phạm Phước Hưng	6.300	8.400		14.700	R3

==== Horizontal bar ====
Rank	Name	Difficulty	Execution	Penalty	Total	Qualification
1	(Netherlands) Epke Zonderland	6.500	7.933		14.433	Q
2	(Switzerland) Pablo Brägger	6.800	7.633		14.433	Q
3	(Croatia) Tin Srbić	6.400	7.966		14.366	Q
4	(Switzerland) Oliver Hegi	6.200	8.133		14.333	Q
5	(Russia) David Belyavskiy	5.800	8.408		14.208	Q
6	(Netherlands) Bart Deurloo	6.100	7.933		14.033	Q
7	(Cuba) Randy Lerú	6.200	7.800		14.000	Q
8	(Japan) Hidetaka Miyachi	6.200	7.766		13.966	Q
9	(United Kingdom) Nile Wilson	6.100	7.833		13.933	R1
10	(United States) Marvin Kimble	6.200	7.733		13.933	R2
11	(Russia) Nikita Nagornyy	5.600	8.300		13.900	R3

=== Women's results ===
==== Individual all-around ====
Rank	Gymnast	Vault (gymnastics)	Uneven bars	Balance beam	Floor (gymnastics)	Total	Qualification
1	(Japan) Mai Murakami	14.633	13.900	13.200	14.200	55.933	Q
2	(United States) Ragan Smith	14.466	14.133	12.900	14.433	55.932	Q
3	(Canada) Ellie Black	14.500	14.400	13.433	13.433	55.766	Q
4	(France) Mélanie de Jesus dos Santos	14.500	14.500	13.066	13.233	55.299	Q
5	(Russia) Elena Eremina	13.866	15.100	13.233	12.800	54.999	Q
6	(United States) Morgan Hurd	14.466	14.333	13.500	12.533	54.832	Q
7	(Ukraine) Diana Varinska	13.716	14.566	13.033	12.600	53.915	Q
8	(Belgium) Nina Derwael	13.566	14.966	12.333	12.733	53.598	Q
9	(Japan) Aiko Sugihara	14.066	13.300	12.466	13.433	53.265	Q
10	(Russia) Angelina Melnikova	14.400	14.966	12.600	11.166	53.132	Q
11	(Switzerland) Giulia Steingruber	15.100	12.833	11.933	13.266	53.132	Q
12	(Germany) Tabea Alt	14.200	12.366	13.533	12.933	53.032	Q
13	(United Kingdom) Amy Tinkler	14.366	13.066	12.066	13.333	52.831	Q
14	(Spain) Ana Pérez	14.100	12.733	12.933	12.966	52.732	Q
15	(Canada) Brooklyn Moors	14.166	13.066	11.533	13.866	52.631	Q
16	(China) Wang Yan	14.400	13.400	11.266	13.366	52.432	Q
17	(Brazil) Thaís Fidélis	13.633	13.200	11.766	13.733	52.332	Q
18	(Germany) Elisabeth Seitz	13.600	14.700	11.200	12.500	52.000	Q
19	(Italy) Lara Mori	13.325	13.466	11.666	13.500	51.957	Q
20	(Australia) Georgia Godwin	13.475	13.000	12.666	12.733	51.874	Q
21	(Belgium) Rune Hermans	13.333	13.800	11.900	12.833	51.866	Q
22	(Portugal) Ana Filipa Martins	13.166	13.333	12.633	12.433	51.565	Q
23	(France) Marine Boyer	13.633	13.200	12.466	12.100	51.399	Q
24	(United Kingdom) Alice Kinsella	13.666	13.533	11.200	12.966	51.365	Q
25	(Belgium) Maellyse Brassart	13.741	12.533	12.200	12.333	50.807	-
26	(South Korea) Lee Eun-ju	13.300	12.933	12.066	12.100	50.399	R1
27	(Romania) Ioana Crișan	13.600	12.600	11.233	12.800	50.233	R2
28	(Azerbaijan) Marina Nekrasova	14.108	11.933	11.766	12.166	49.973	R3
29	(Hungary) Zsófia Kovács	12.733	13.766	11.533	11.666	49.698	R4

==== Vault ====
Rank	Name	D Score	E Score	Pen.	Score 1	D Score	E Score	Pen.	Score 2	Total	Qualification
Rank	Name	Vault 1				Vault 2				Total	Qualification
1	(Russia) Maria Paseka	6.000	8.866		14.866	5.800	9.200		15.000	14.933	Q
2	(United States) Jade Carey	5.800	9.266		15.066	5.600	9.033		14.633	14.849	Q
3	(Switzerland) Giulia Steingruber	5.800	9.300		15.100	5.400	9.000		14.400	14.750	Q
4	(Canada) Shallon Olsen	5.400	8.966		14.366	6.000	8.933		14.933	14.649	Q
5	(China) Wang Yan	5.600	8.800		14.400	5.800	8.900		14.700	14.550	Q
6	(Japan) Sae Miyakawa	5.800	9.100		14.900	5.400	8.833	0.100	14.133	14.516	Q
7	(Canada) Ellie Black	5.400	9.100		14.500	5.200	9.266		14.466	14.483	Q
8	(Uzbekistan) Oksana Chusovitina	5.400	8.966		14.366	5.200	9.133		14.333	14.349	Q
9	(Netherlands) Tisha Volleman	5.400	9.066		14.466	5.200	8.800	0.100	13.900	14.183	R1
10	(Russia) Angelina Melnikova	5.400	9.000		14.400	5.200	8.733	0.100	13.833	14.116	R2
11	(United Kingdom) Amy Tinkler	5.400	8.966		14.366	4.800	8.800		13.600	13.983	R3

==== Uneven bars ====
Rank	Name	Difficulty	Execution	Penalty	Total	Qualification
1	(Russia) Elena Eremina	6.300	8.800		15.100	Q
2	(Russia) Anastasia Ilyankova	6.200	8.866		15.066	Q
3	(China) Fan Yilin	6.300	8.700		15.000	Q
4	(Belgium) Nina Derwael	6.300	8.666		14.966	Q
4	(Russia) Angelina Melnikova	6.300	8.666		14.966	-
6	(Germany) Elisabeth Seitz	6.100	8.600		14.700	Q
7	(United States) Ashton Locklear	5.500	9.066		14.566	Q
8	(China) Luo Huan	6.000	8.566		14.566	Q
8	(Ukraine) Diana Varinska	6.000	8.566		14.566	Q
10	(United Kingdom) Georgia-Mae Fenton	5.900	8.633		14.533	R1
11	(France) Mélanie de Jesus dos Santos	5.800	8.700		14.500	R2
12	(Canada) Ellie Black	5.900	8.500		14.400	R3

==== Balance beam ====
Rank	Name	Difficulty	Execution	Penalty	Total	Qualification
1	(Germany) Tabea Alt	5.900	7.633		13.533	Q
2	(United States) Morgan Hurd	5.600	7.900		13.500	Q
3	(Germany) Pauline Schäfer	5.300	8.133		13.433	Q
4	(Canada) Ellie Black	5.800	7.633		13.433	Q
5	(Japan) Asuka Teramoto	5.700	7.633		13.333	Q
6	(Russia) Elena Eremina	5.400	7.833		13.233	Q
7	(China) Liu Tingting	5.700	7.633	0.1	13.233	Q
8	(Japan) Mai Murakami	5.600	7.600		13.200	Q
9	(France) Mélanie de Jesus dos Santos	5.700	7.366		13.066	R1
10	(Ukraine) Diana Varinska	5.100	7.933		13.033	R2
11	(Spain) Ana Pérez	5.100	7.833		12.933	R3

==== Floor ====
Rank	Name	Difficulty	Execution	Penalty	Total	Qualification
1	(United States) Ragan Smith	5.800	8.633		14.433	Q
2	(Japan) Mai Murakami	5.800	8.400		14.200	Q
3	(United States) Jade Carey	5.700	8.400		14.100	Q
4	(United Kingdom) Claudia Fragapane	5.700	8.233		13.933	Q
5	(Canada) Brooklyn Moors	5.400	8.466		13.866	Q
6	(Brazil) Thaís Fidélis	5.500	8.233		13.733	Q
7	(Italy) Vanessa Ferrari	5.700	7.900		13.600	Q
8	(Italy) Lara Mori	5.600	7.900		13.500	Q
9	(Canada) Ellie Black	5.000	8.433		13.433	R1
10	(Japan) Aiko Sugihara	5.300	8.133		13.433	R2
11	(China) Wang Yan	5.700	8.066	0.4	13.366	R3

=== Subdivisions ===
Men
Subdivision 1	(Chinese Taipei) TPE (Germany) GER (Bulgaria) BUL (Uzbekistan) UZB (Armenia) ARM (Greece) GRE (Sweden) SWE (Ecuador) ECU (Jamaica) JAM (Venezuela) VEN (Iceland) ISL (Ukraine) UKR (Algeria) ALG (Vietnam) VIE (Qatar) QAT (Cuba) CUB (Israel) ISR
Subdivision 2	(Belarus) BLR (Egypt) EGY (Cyprus) CYP (Norway) NOR (Hong Kong) HKG (Guatemala) GUA (Denmark) DEN (Mexico) MEX (Thailand) THA (United States) USA (Argentina) ARG (Belgium) BEL (Switzerland) SUI (United Kingdom) GBR (India) IND (Croatia) CRO (Trinidad and Tobago) TTO
Subdivision 3	(China) CHN (Canada) CAN (Mongolia) MGL (Russia) RUS (Hungary) HUN (Latvia) LAT (Australia) AUS (Japan) JPN (Kazakhstan) KAZ (Azerbaijan) AZE (Georgia (country)) GEO (Portugal) POR (France) FRA (Slovenia) SLO (Spain) ESP (Romania) ROU (Dominican Republic) DOM
Subdivision 4	(New Zealand) NZL (Brazil) BRA (Netherlands) NED (Sri Lanka) SRI (Republic of Ireland) IRL (Turkey) TUR (Italy) ITA (Chile) CHI (Austria) AUT (Colombia) COL (Slovakia) SVK (South Korea) KOR (Lithuania) LTU (Jordan) JOR (Finland) FIN (Peru) PER (Czech Republic) CZE
Women
Subdivision 1	(Spain) ESP (Venezuela) VEN (Iceland) ISL (Denmark) DEN (Jamaica) JAM (Croatia) CRO (Latvia) LAT (Argentina) ARG (United Kingdom) GBR (Australia) AUS
Subdivision 2	(South Africa) RSA (Vietnam) VIE (India) IND (Belgium) BEL (Canada) CAN (Hong Kong) HKG (Israel) ISR (Russia) RUS (Egypt) EGY (Portugal) POR
Subdivision 3	(Azerbaijan) AZE (Mexico) MEX (Czech Republic) CZE (Norway) NOR (Slovakia) SVK (Netherlands) NED (Puerto Rico) PUR (Austria) AUT (Romania) ROU (Switzerland) SUI (Lithuania) LTU
Subdivision 4	(New Zealand) NZL (Germany) GER (France) FRA (Bulgaria) BUL (Kazakhstan) KAZ (Hungary) HUN (Italy) ITA (Sweden) SWE (Chinese Taipei) TPE (Turkey) TUR (Greece) GRE
Subdivision 5	(Finland) FIN (United States) USA (Cuba) CUB (Ukraine) UKR (Brazil) BRA (Slovenia) SLO (Japan) JPN (South Korea) KOR (Uzbekistan) UZB (Colombia) COL (China) CHN (Panama) PAN
