= Eleftherios Petrounias =

Greek artistic gymnast

Eleftherios Petrounias Ελευθέριος Πετρούνιας
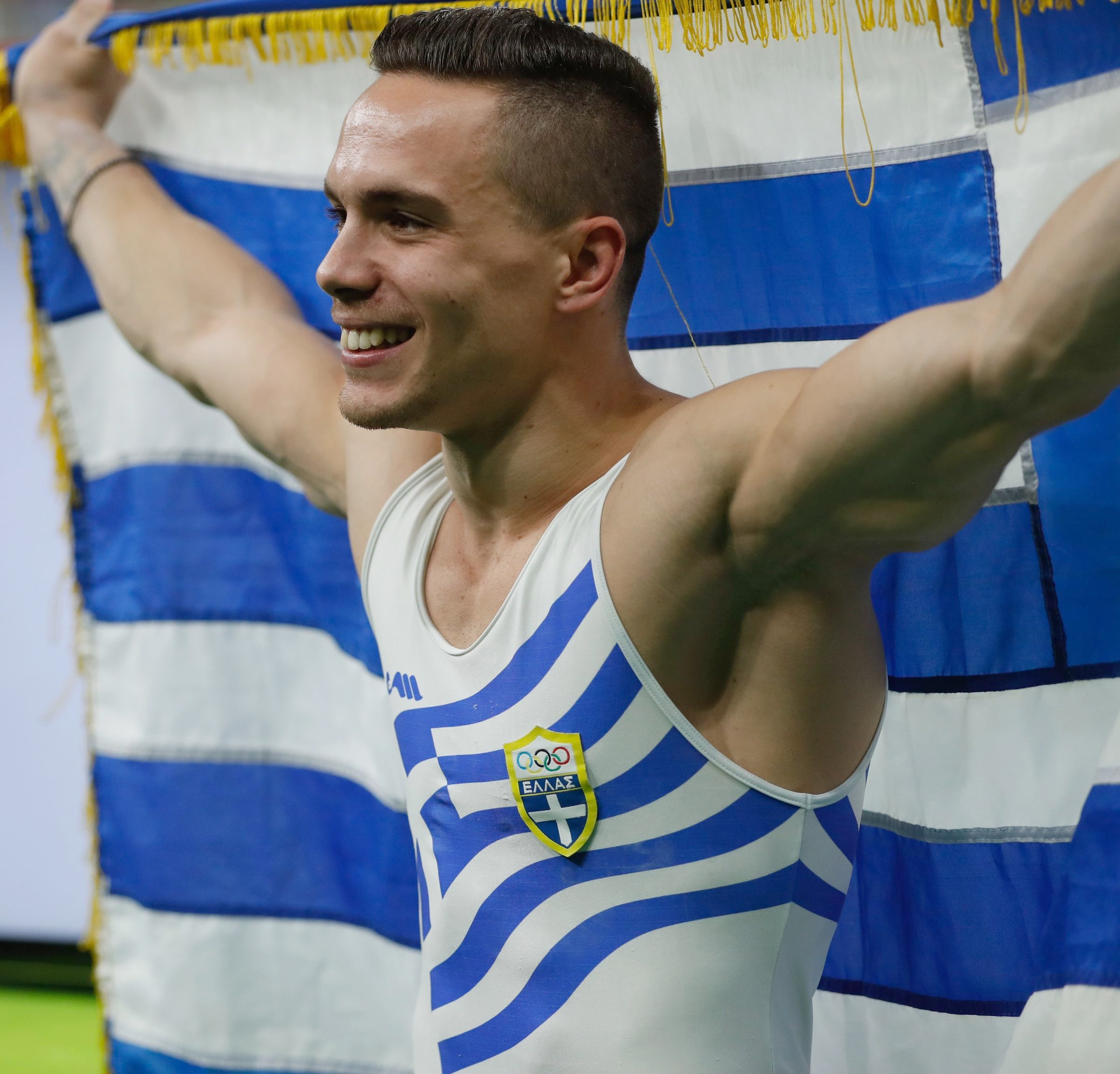
- Petrounias at the 2016 Summer Olympics

Personal information
- Born: 30 November 1990 (age 35) Athens, Greece
- Height: 1.64 m (5 ft 5 in)
- Spouse: Vasiliki Millousi (m. 2019)

Gymnastics career
- Discipline: Men's artistic gymnastics
- Country represented: Greece
- Head coach: Dimitris Raftis
Medal record
Event	1st	2nd	3rd
Olympic Games	1	0	2
World Championships	3	2	0
European Championships	8	0	3
Total	12	2	5
Artistic gymnastics
Representing Greece
Olympic Games
Gold medal – first place	2016 Rio de Janeiro	Rings
Bronze medal – third place	2020 Tokyo	Rings
Bronze medal – third place	2024 Paris	Rings
World Championships
Gold medal – first place	2015 Glasgow	Rings
Gold medal – first place	2017 Montreal	Rings
Gold medal – first place	2018 Doha	Rings
Silver medal – second place	2023 Antwerp	Rings
Silver medal – second place	2026 Rotterdam	Rings
European Games
Gold medal – first place	2015 Baku	Rings
European Championships
Gold medal – first place	2015 Montpellier	Rings
Gold medal – first place	2016 Bern	Rings
Gold medal – first place	2017 Cluj-Napoca	Rings
Gold medal – first place	2018 Glasgow	Rings
Gold medal – first place	2021 Basel	Rings
Gold medal – first place	2022 Munich	Rings
Gold medal – first place	2024 Rimini	Rings
Gold medal – first place	2025 Leipzig	Rings
Bronze medal – third place	2011 Berlin	Rings
Bronze medal – third place	2023 Antalya	Rings
Bronze medal – third place	2026 Zagreb	Rings
Mediterranean Games
Gold medal – first place	2013 Mersin	Rings

Eleftherios "Lefteris" Petrounias (Greek: Ελευθέριος "Λευτέρης" Πετρούνιας, IPA: [elefˈθeri.oz lefˈteris peˈtruɲas]; born 30 November 1990) is a Greek artistic gymnast. He is the 2016 Olympic champion, 2020 and 2024 Olympic bronze medalist, three-time World champion (2015, 2017, 2018) and a ten-time (2011, 2015–18, 2021–25) European medalist on the still rings (eight gold and two bronze). He was named the Greek Male Athlete of the Year in 2015, 2016, 2017, and 2018.

== Early life and education ==
Petrounias has a degree in communications and marketing from the Athens University of Economics and Business. Besides gymnastics, he practices parkour. He takes part in anti-bullying campaigns, as he was bullied himself when he was a child due to his small size.

== Gymnastics career ==
=== 2011–2012 ===
Petrounias' debut major international medal came when he competed at the 2011 European Championships in Berlin, at the age of 20. During the competition, Petrounias won the bronze medal on the rings. He scored 15.675 during the final, behind Konstantin Pluzhnikov (15.850) and Aleksandr Balandin (15.775) of Russia.

At the 2012 European Championships, Petrounias placed fifth on rings. Throughout the year, he won five medals while competing in the 2012 World Cup series.

=== 2013–2016 ===
At the 2013 European Championships, Petrounias placed fifth on rings. At the 2013 Mediterranean Games, he won gold on the apparatus ahead of İbrahim Çolak of Turkey and Javier Gómez Fuertes of Spain. At the 2013 World Championships, Petrounias placed ninth during qualifications and did not advance to the final.

In early 2014, Petrounias competed at the 2014 European Championships, where he placed sixth on rings. Later that year at the World Championships, he once again placed sixth on rings.

In April 2015, Petrounias competed in the 2015 European Championships in Montpellier, France. He won gold during the rings final, scoring 15.866 during the final - 0.300 points ahead of tied silver medalists Samir Aït Saïd of France and Denis Ablyazin of Russia. In June he competed at the inaugural European Games where he won gold on rings ahead of Nikita Ignatyev and Çolak.

In late 2015, Petrounias competed in the 2015 World Championships in Glasgow. He qualified for the rings final in first place, scoring 15.900. During the final, Petrounias won his first World Title on ring with a scored 15.800; You Hao of China was the silver medalist, followed by bronze medalist Liu Yang of China.

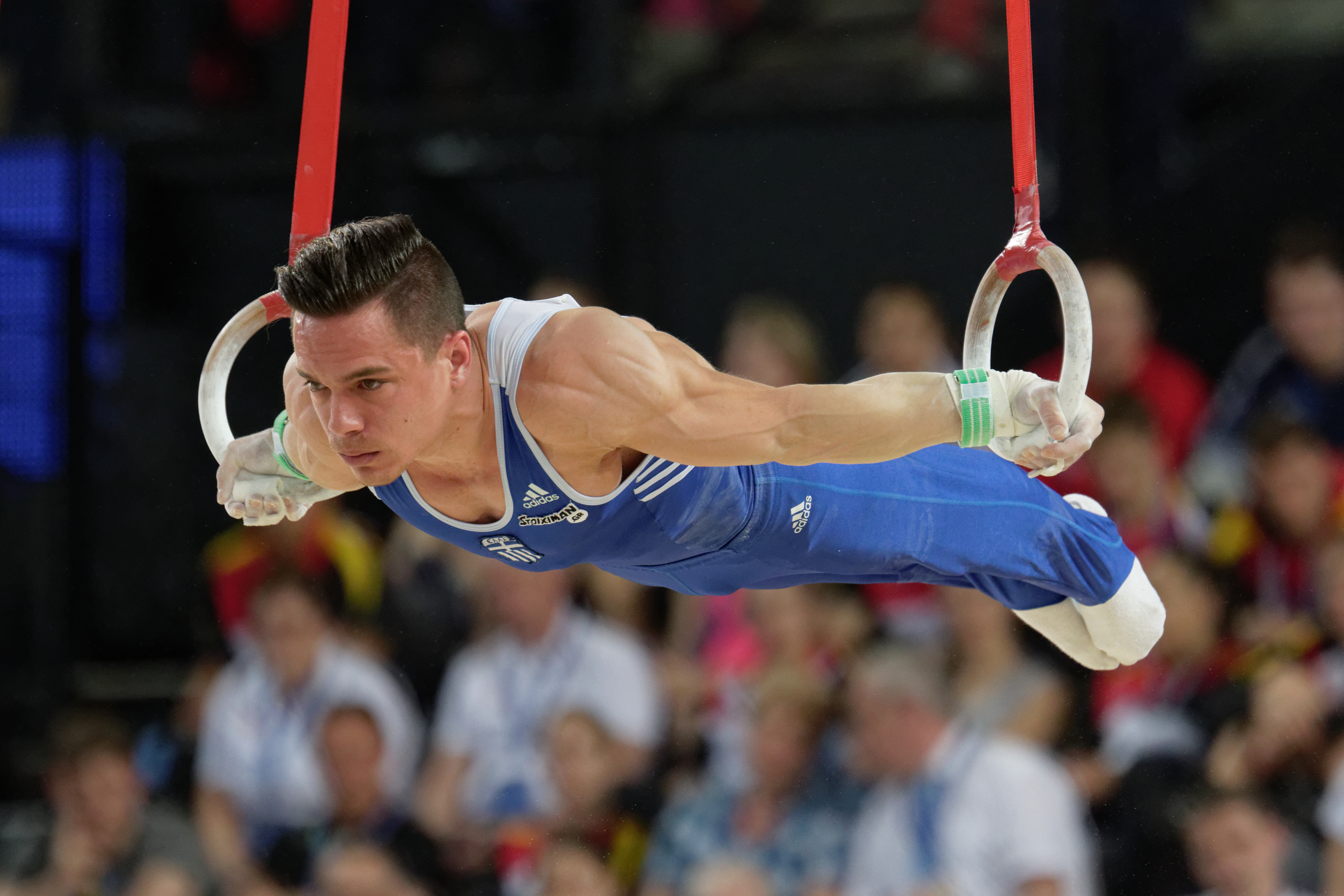
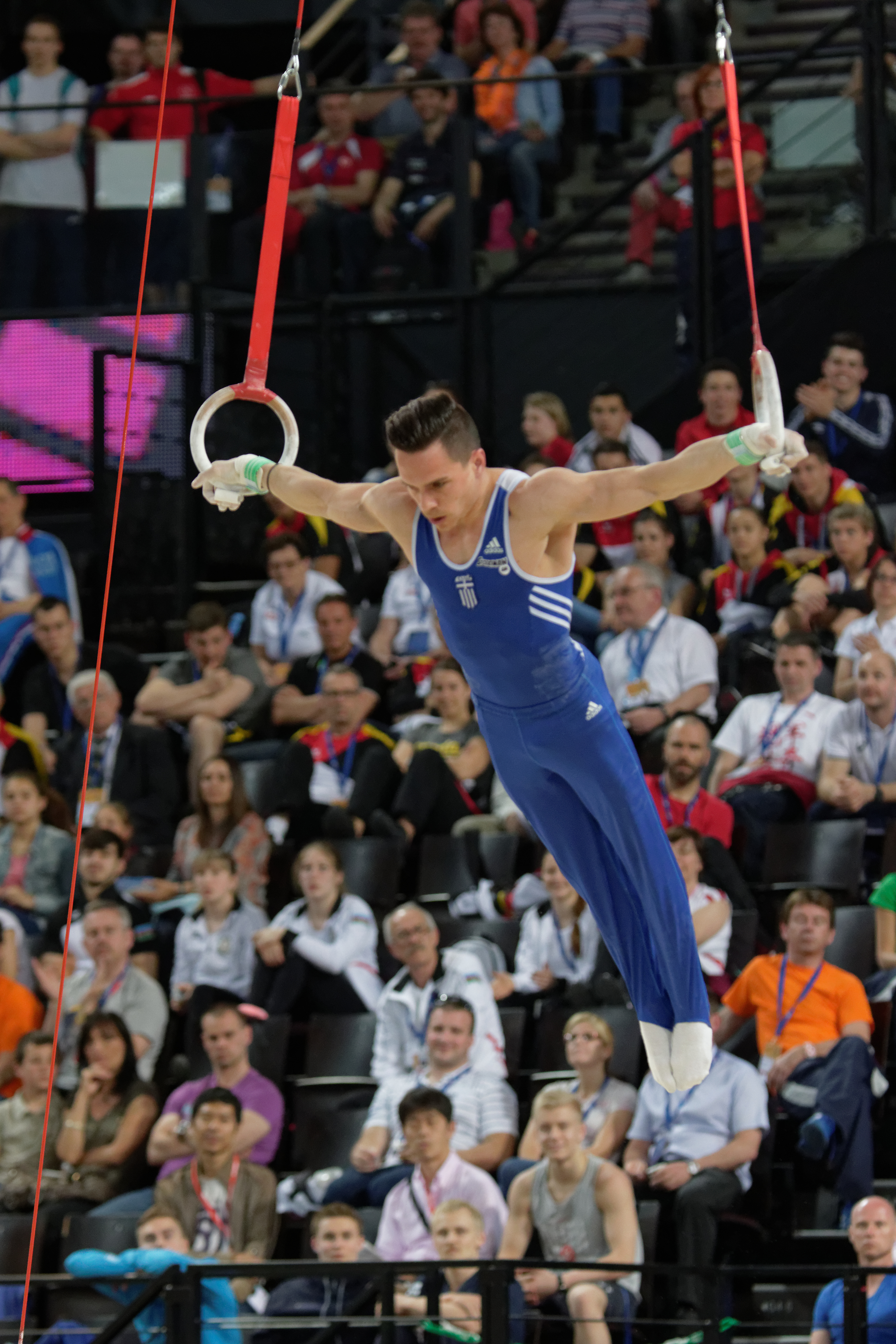
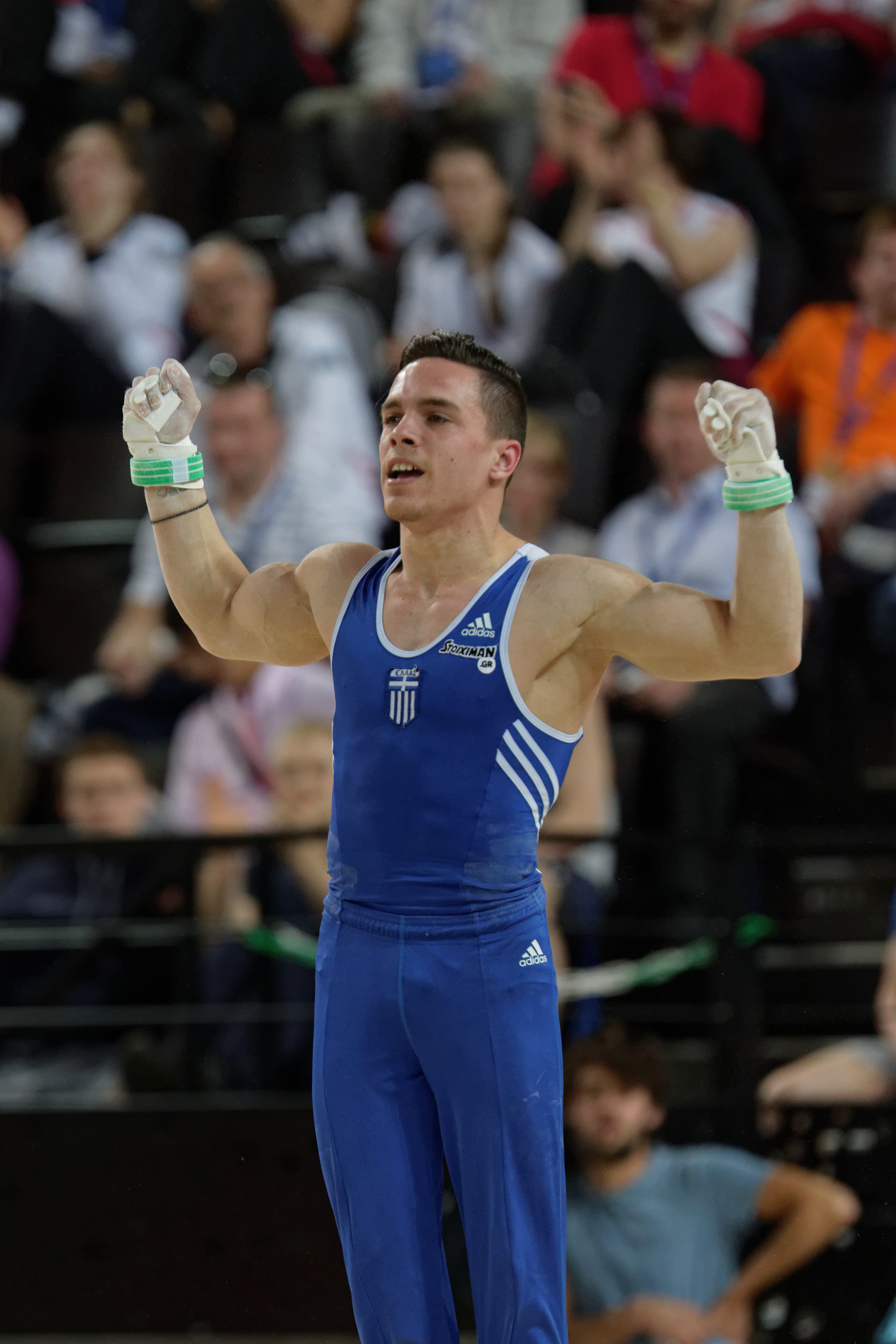
Petrounias at the 2015 European Championships

In May 2016, Petrounias attended the 2016 European Championships in Bern, Switzerland. He qualified in first place for the rings final, scoring 15.700.

Petrounias was the Olympic torch relay originating torchbearer after its ignition at Olympia on 21 April 2016, and he has the further distinction of being the first Greek gymnast selected in modern Olympic torch relay history.

At the 2016 Olympic Games Petrounias won the gold medal on rings ahead of Arthur Zanetti of Brazil and Denis Ablyazin of Russia.

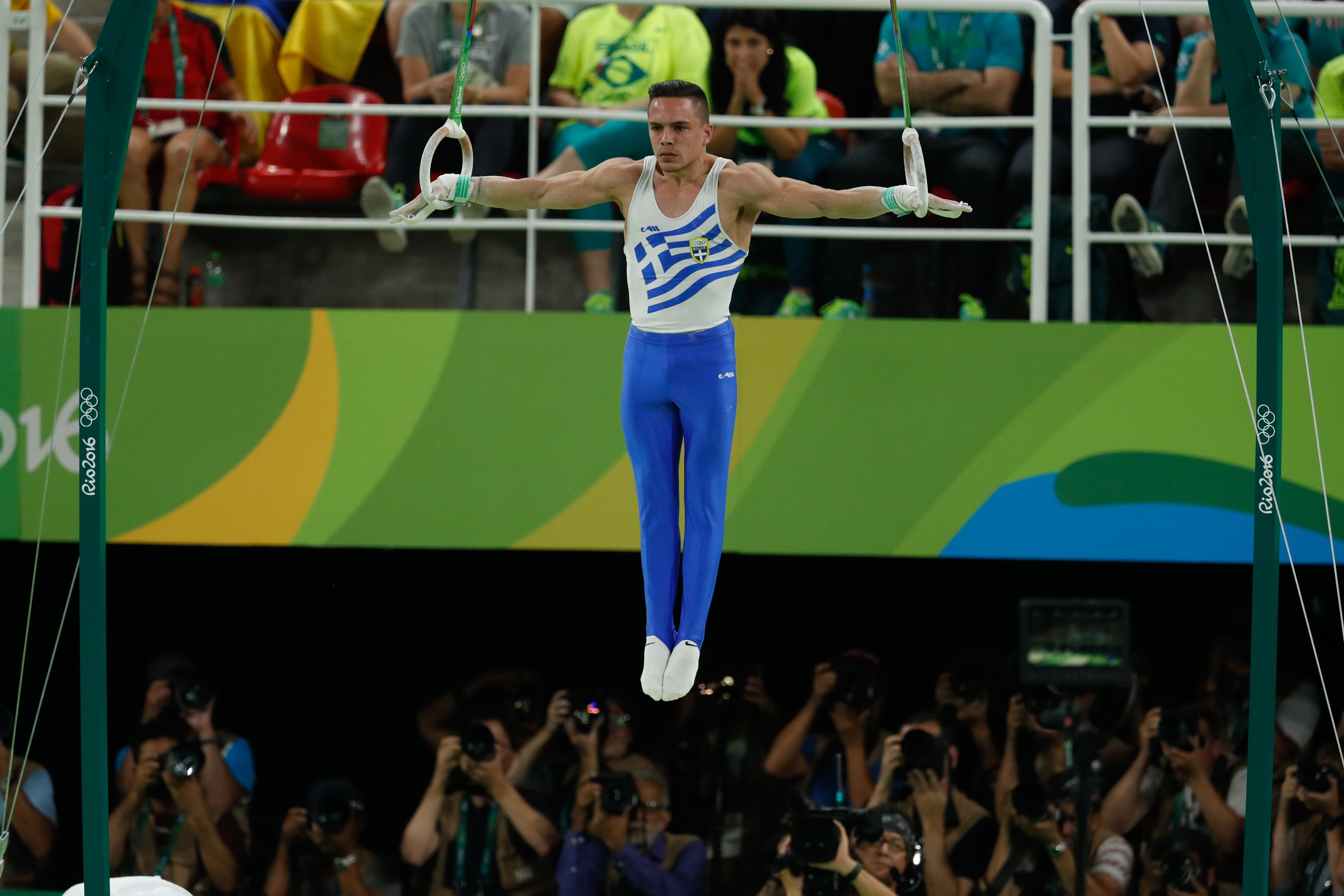
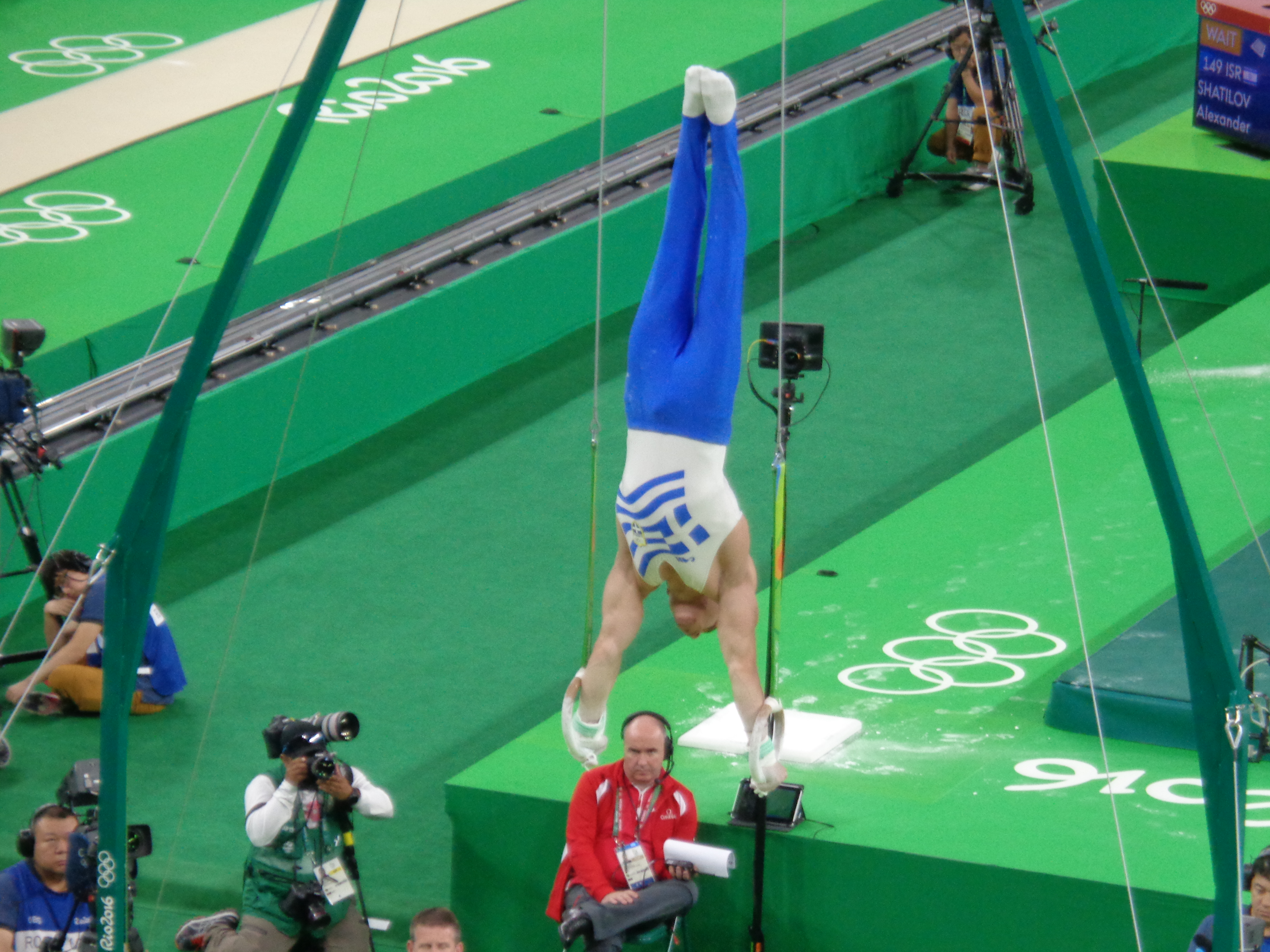
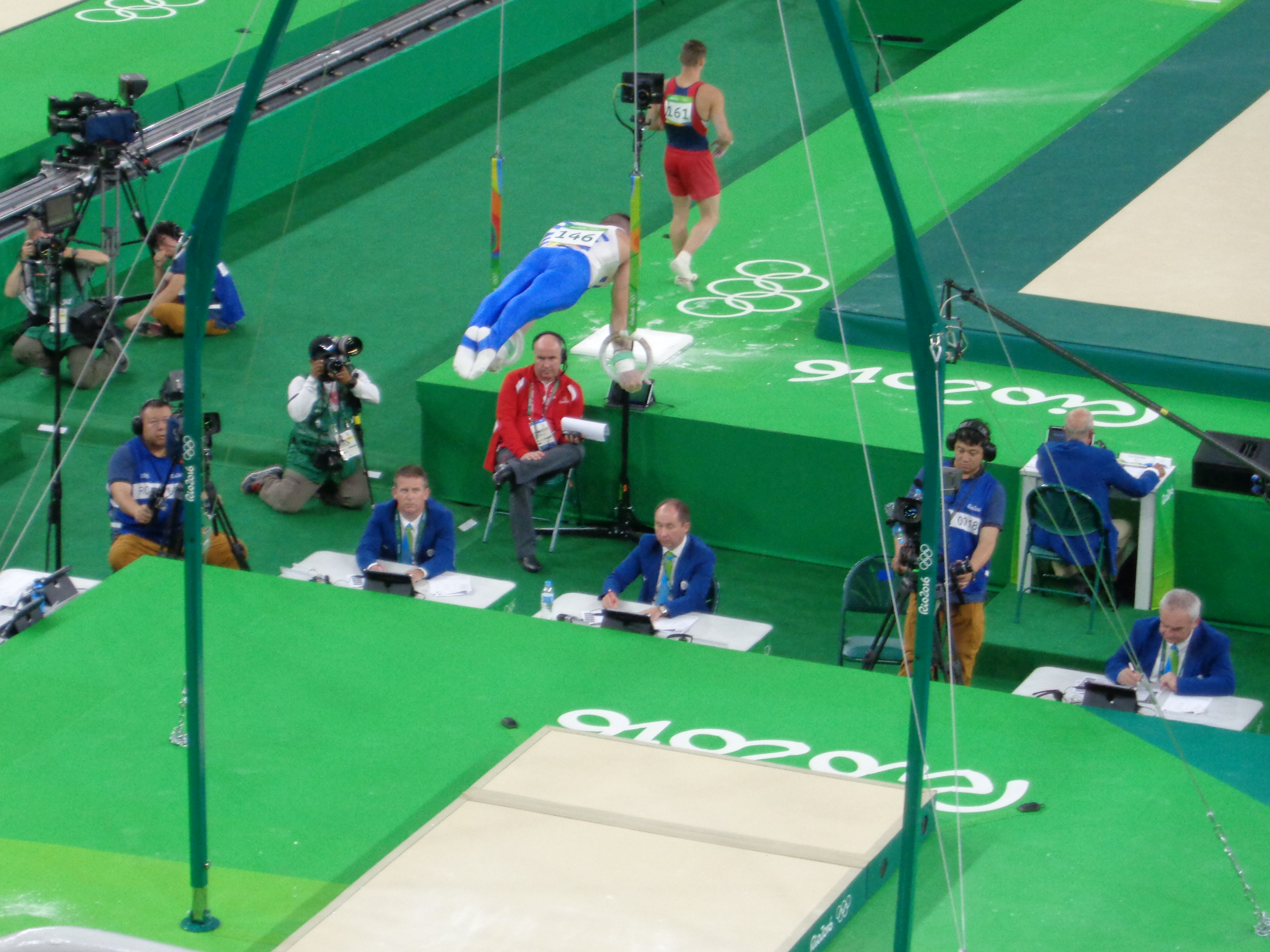
Petrounias at the 2016 Olympic Games

=== 2017–2021 ===
In April 2017, Petrounias competed at the 2017 European Championships at the Polyvalent Hall in Cluj-Napoca, Romania. During the competition, Petrounias secured his third European Championship rings title, scoring 15.433 in the final, above silver medalist Courtney Tulloch of Great Britain, who scored 15.066, and bronze medalist Igor Radivilov of Ukraine, who scored 15.033.

In late 2017, Petrounias competed at the 2017 World Championships in Montreal. Petrounias successfully defended his World title on rings, scoring 15.433 during the final - 0.100 points above Denis Abliazin of Russia, who won silver, and 0.167 points above Liu Yang of China, who won bronze.

Petrounias won the gold medal on rings at the 2018 European Championships in Glasgow despite a shoulder injury.

At the 2018 World Championships in Doha, Petrounias successfully defended his title and earned his third World Championship gold on rings with a score of 15.366. Arthur Zanetti, the 2012 Olympic champion on rings, earned the silver and Marco Lodadio earned bronze.

Petrounias competed at the 2020 Olympic Games in Tokyo, where he was also the flag bearer of Greek team along with Greek shooter Anna Korakaki. He won bronze on rings behind Chinese athletes Liu Yang and You Hao.

=== 2022–2024 ===
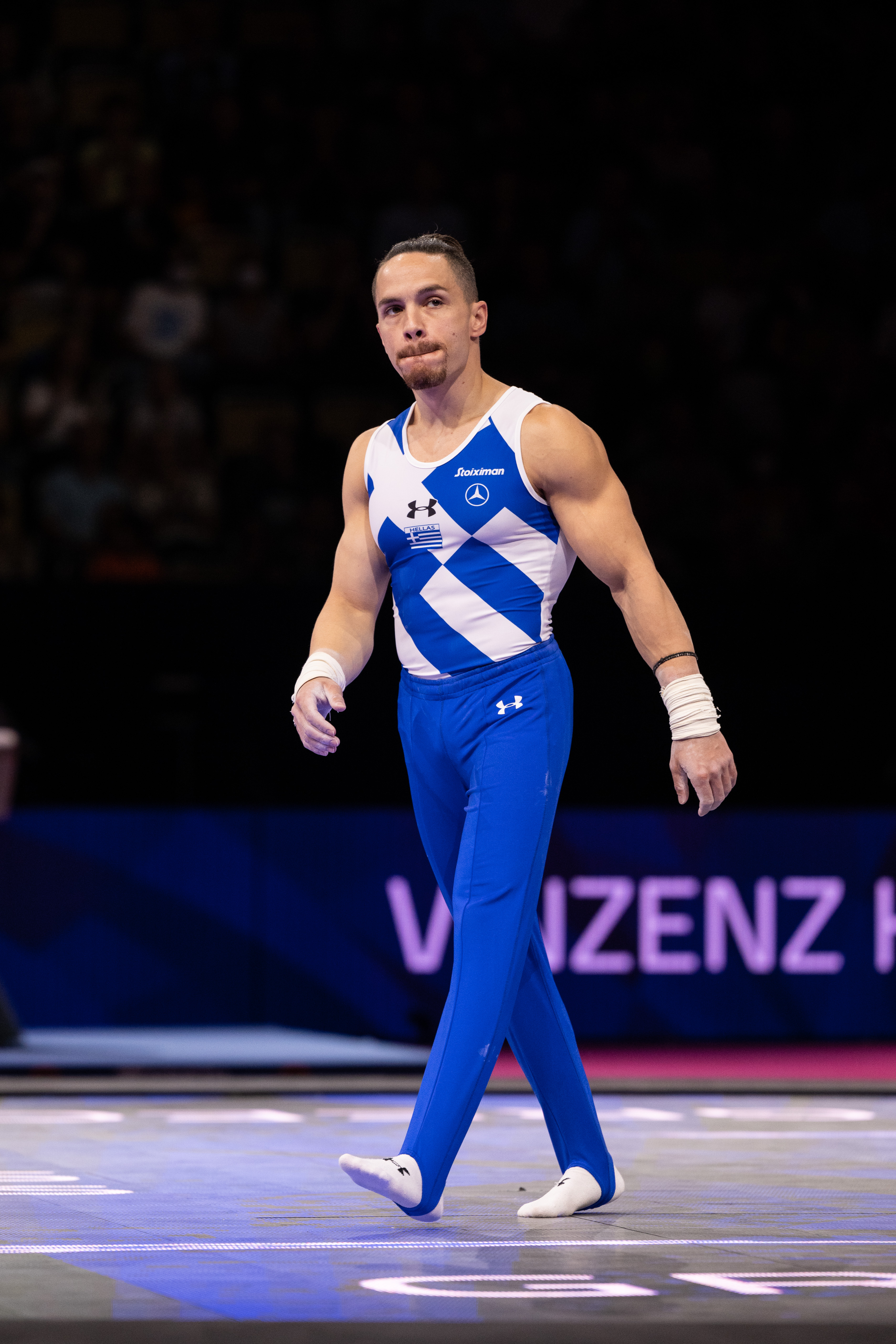
Petrounias at the 2022 European Championships

At the 2022 European Championships in Munich Petrounias won his sixth European title on rings, ahead of Adem Asil and Courtney Tulloch.

At the 2023 European Championships, Petrounias won bronze behind Adem Asil and Vahagn Davtyan.

Petrounias competed at the 2023 World Championships in Antwerp. He won silver on rings, once again sharing a podium with Chinese athletes Liu and You. As the highest-ranking athlete on rings not part of a qualified team, Petrounias qualified as an individual for the 2024 Olympic Games.

At the 2024 European Championships Petrnounias won his seventh European title on rings.

Petrounias competed at the 2024 Olympic Games in Paris. He won bronze on rings behind Chinese athletes Liu Yang and Zou Jingyuan. In doing so, Petrounias became the first person to win three medals on rings at the Olympic Games.

=== 2025 ===
Petrounias won gold on rings at the 2025 European Championships, tied with Adem Asil. In doing so, he extended his record of continental titles won on the same apparatus to eight. Additionally Petrounias, alongside Luxembourg gymnast Céleste Mordenti, was awarded the SmartScoring Shooting Star Award, an award which is presented to "a gymnast with an exceptional story in the spotlight, someone who is an inspiration for the future generation of gymnasts and the general public alike".

== Personal life ==
Petrounias has been married to fellow Greek gymnast Vasiliki Millousi since July 2019. They have two daughters, Sofia and Eleni.

== Competitive history ==
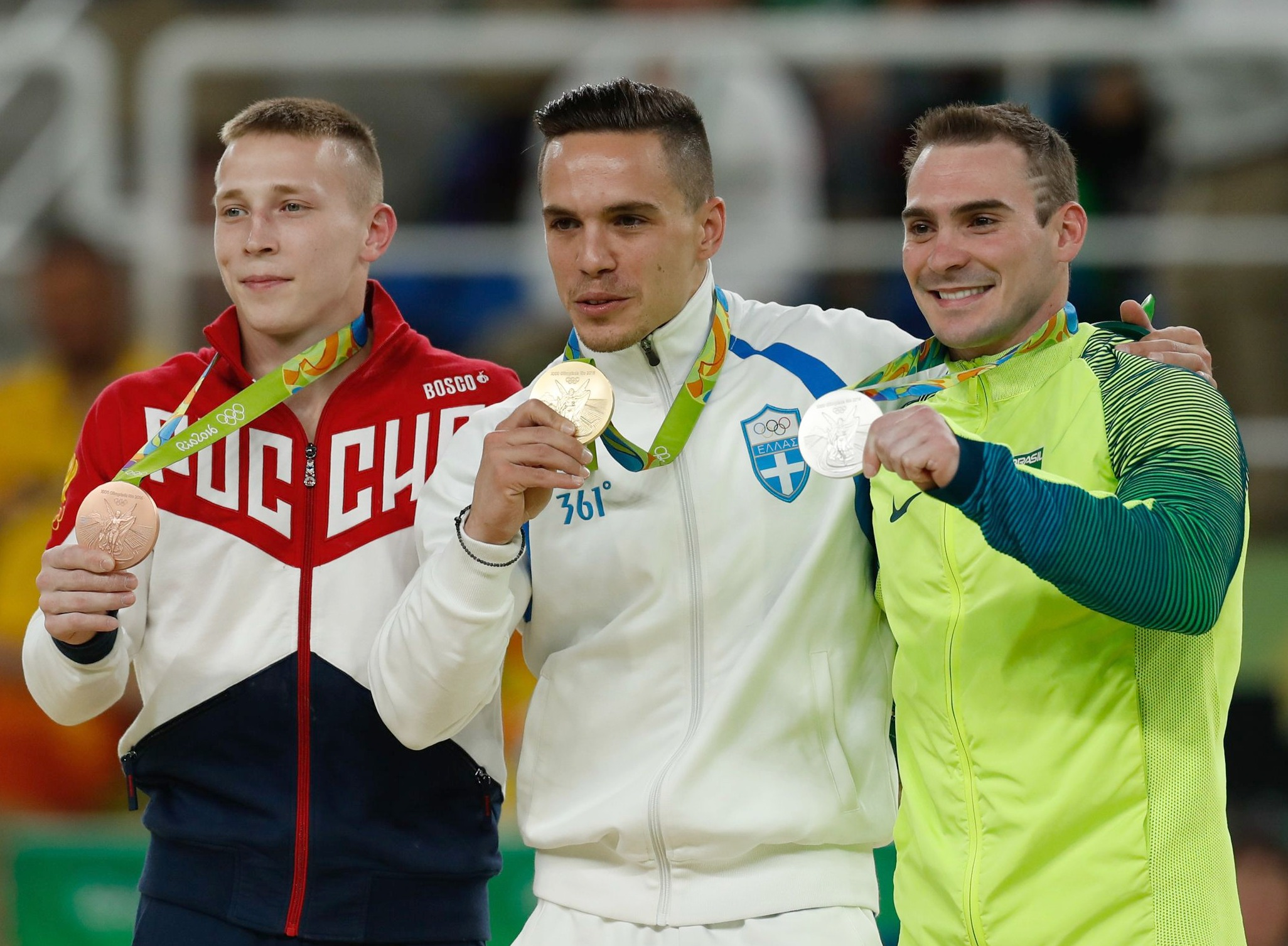
2016 Olympic podium

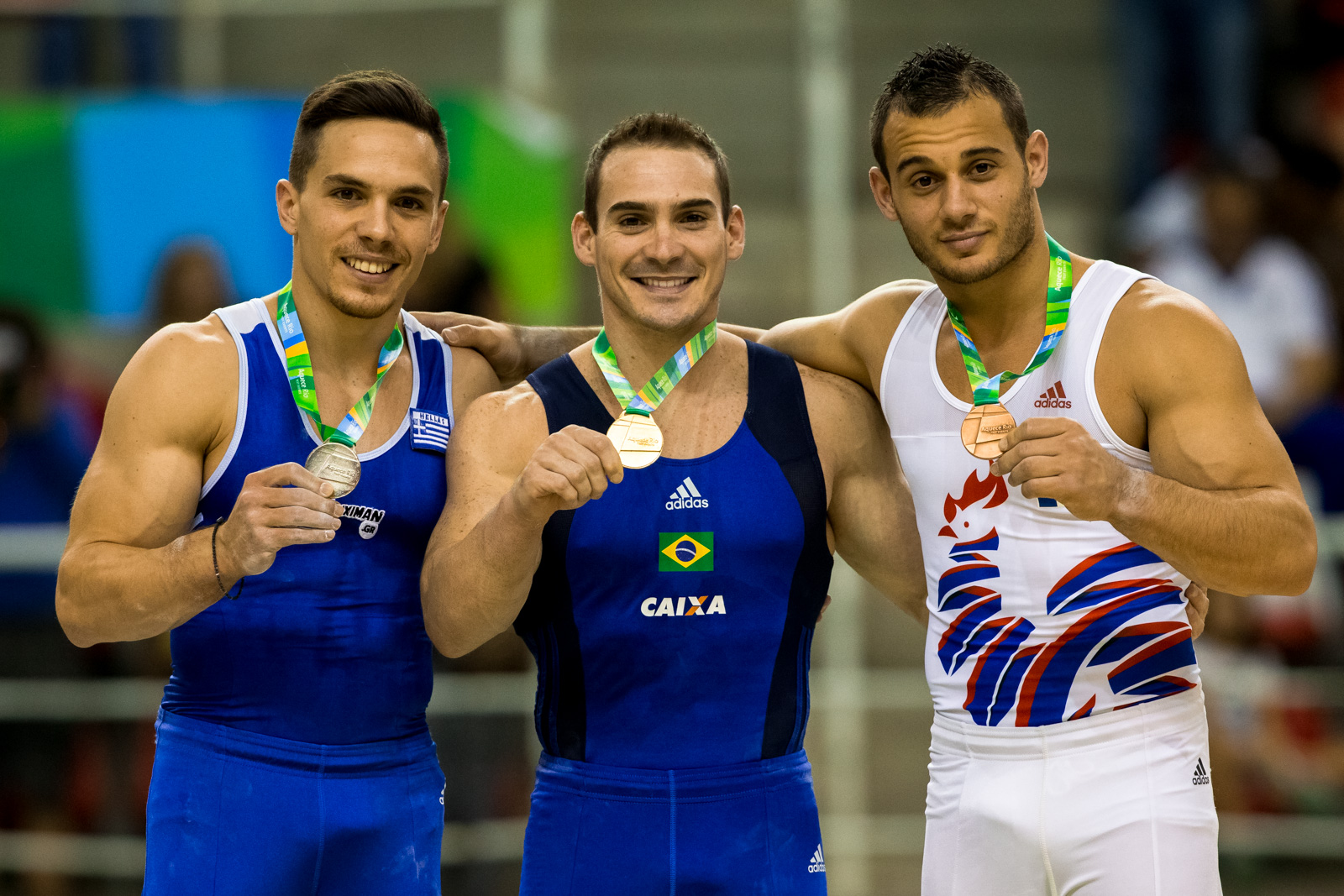
2016 Olympic test event podium

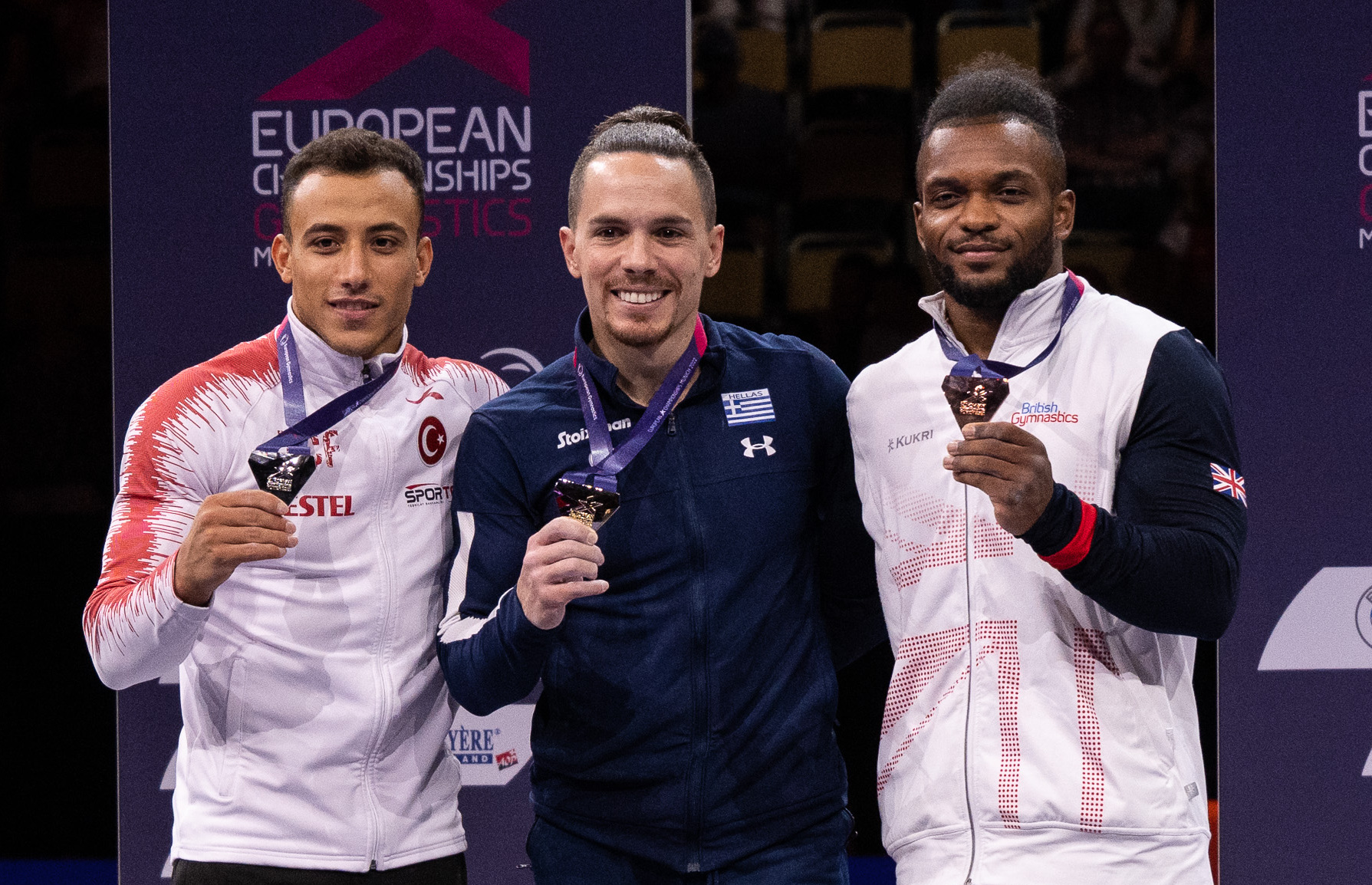
2022 European Championships podium

Competitive history of Eleftherios Petrounias
Year	Event	Team	AA	FX	PH	SR	VT	PB	HB
2008
2008	Junior European Championships	7				7			
2009	Cottbus World Cup					4			
2009	Glasgow World Cup					4			
2009	Doha World Cup					3rd place, bronze medalist(s)			
2009	World Championships					13			
2010	Ghent World Cup					3rd place, bronze medalist(s)			
2010	Glasgow World Cup					6			
2011	Cottbus World Cup					2nd place, silver medalist(s)			
2011	European Championships					3rd place, bronze medalist(s)			
2011	Ghent World Cup					1st place, gold medalist(s)			
2011	Maribor World Cup					1st place, gold medalist(s)			
2011	Ostrava World Cup					1st place, gold medalist(s)			
2012	Cottbus Challenge Cup					3rd place, bronze medalist(s)			
2012	Zibo Challenge Cup					2nd place, silver medalist(s)			
2012	Osijek Challenge Cup					3rd place, bronze medalist(s)			
2012	European Championships					5			
2012	Ghent Challenge Cup					2nd place, silver medalist(s)			
2012	Ostrava Challenge Cup					1st place, gold medalist(s)			
2013	La Roche-sur-Yon World Cup					1st place, gold medalist(s)			
2013	Cottbus Challenge Cup					1st place, gold medalist(s)			
2013	European Championships					5			
2013	Ljubljana Challenge Cup					1st place, gold medalist(s)			
2013	Mediterranean Games					1st place, gold medalist(s)			
2013	World Championships					9			
2014	Cottbus Challenge Cup					2nd place, silver medalist(s)			
2014	European Championships	14				5			
2014	World Championships	22				6			
2015	Cottbus Challenge Cup					2nd place, silver medalist(s)			
2015	European Championships					1st place, gold medalist(s)			
2015	European Games	10				1st place, gold medalist(s)			
2015	World Championships	20				1st place, gold medalist(s)			
2016	Olympic Test Event					2nd place, silver medalist(s)			
2016	Doha Challenge Cup					1st place, gold medalist(s)			
2016	European Championships	13				1st place, gold medalist(s)			
2016	Olympic Games					1st place, gold medalist(s)			
2017	Baku World Cup					1st place, gold medalist(s)			
2017	European Championships					1st place, gold medalist(s)			
2017	Paris Challenge Cup					1st place, gold medalist(s)			
2017	World Championships					1st place, gold medalist(s)			
2018	Baku World Cup					1st place, gold medalist(s)			
2018	European Championships					1st place, gold medalist(s)			
2018	World Championships	26				1st place, gold medalist(s)			
2019
2019	World Championships					4			
2019	Cottbus World Cup					2nd place, silver medalist(s)			
2020	Melbourne World Cup					1st place, gold medalist(s)			
2020	Baku World Cup					1st place, gold medalist(s)			
2021
2021	European Championships					1st place, gold medalist(s)			
2021	Doha World Cup					1st place, gold medalist(s)			
2021	Olympic Games					3rd place, bronze medalist(s)			
2022
2022	European Championships					1st place, gold medalist(s)			
2023	Cottbus World Cup					1st place, gold medalist(s)			
2023	Cairo World Cup					12			
2023	European Championships					3rd place, bronze medalist(s)			
2023	Szombathely World Cup					WD			
2023	World Championships					2nd place, silver medalist(s)			
2024
2024	European Championships					1st place, gold medalist(s)			
2024	Olympic Games					3rd place, bronze medalist(s)			
2025	Osijek World Cup					6			
2025	European Championships					1st place, gold medalist(s)			
2025	World Championships					5			
2026	Baku World Cup					2nd place, silver medalist(s)			
2026	Cairo World Cup					1st place, gold medalist(s)			
2026	European Championships					3rd place, bronze medalist(s)			
2026	World Championships					2nd place, silver medalist(s)			
