= Liu Yang (gymnast, born 1994) =

Chinese artistic gymnast

- Born: 11 August 1994 (age 32) Anshan, Liaoning, China
- Height: 162 cm (5 ft 4 in)

Gymnastics career
- Discipline: Men's artistic gymnastics
- Country represented: China; (2013–present)
- Club: Liaoning Province
- Head coach: Jin Weiguo
Medal record
Representing China
Olympic Games
Gold medal – first place	2020 Tokyo	Rings
Gold medal – first place	2024 Paris	Rings
Silver medal – second place	2024 Paris	Team
Bronze medal – third place	2016 Rio de Janeiro	Team
World Championships
Gold medal – first place	2014 Nanning	Team
Gold medal – first place	2014 Nanning	Rings
Gold medal – first place	2023 Antwerp	Rings
Silver medal – second place	2023 Antwerp	Team
Bronze medal – third place	2015 Glasgow	Team
Bronze medal – third place	2015 Glasgow	Rings
Bronze medal – third place	2017 Montreal	Rings
National Games
Gold medal – first place	2021 Shaanxi	Rings
Gold medal – first place	2025 Guangdong	Rings

Liu Yang (simplified Chinese: 刘洋; traditional Chinese: 劉洋; pinyin: Liú Yáng; born 11 August 1994) is a Chinese artistic gymnast. He is the two-time Olympic and two-time world champion in rings. He was a member of the Chinese team who won gold at the 2014 World Championships and silver at the 2023 World Championships. He was also part of the Chinese team who won bronze in the team competition at the 2016 Olympics.

== Gymnastics career ==
Liu began gymnastics when he was five years old.

At the 2013 Cottbus World Cup, Liu won the silver medal in the rings behind Greek gymnast Eleftherios Petrounias. He finished fourth in the rings final at the 2013 World Championships.

At the 2014 World Championships, Liu competed alongside Cheng Ran, Deng Shudi, Lin Chaopan, You Hao, and Zhang Chenglong, and they won the gold medal in the team event. Individually, he won the gold medal in rings. He said, on winning the rings gold medal, "I am very, very excited that I won the gold medal today and I wish to thank my teammates and my brothers and my sisters who have been cheering for me along the way... Last year during the World Championships I came fourth because of some minor mistakes I made during my performance. But this year I seized the opportunity and I managed to win and I am still very excited right now."

Liu competed at the 2015 World Championships and won the bronze medal with the Chinese team. In the rings final, he won the bronze medal behind Eleftherios Petrounias and You Hao.

Liu was selected to represent China at the 2016 Summer Olympics alongside Deng Shudi, Lin Chaopan, Zhang Chenglong, and You Hao. They won the bronze medal in the team competition behind Japan and Russia. In the rings event final, he finished fourth.

At the 2017 World Championships, Liu won the bronze medal in rings behind Eleftherios Petrounias and Denis Ablyazin.

Liu began his attempt to qualify for the 2020 Olympics through the World Cup series at the 2018 Cottbus World Cup where he won the gold medal in rings. He also won the gold medal in rings at the 2019 Melbourne World Cup and the 2019 Cottbus World Cup. While Liu won the maximum number of points through the World Cup series, he lost the tiebreaker to Eleftherios Petrounias and did not earn the Olympic spot.

China earned an additional quota for the 2020 Olympics through the cancelled All-Around World Cup series, and this spot was awarded to Liu. At the 2020 Olympics, Liu won the gold medal in the rings with a score of 15.500 with teammate You Hao winning the silver medal.

At the 2023 World Championships, Liu won gold on rings and silver with the men's team.
