= Samir Aït Saïd =

French artistic gymnast (born 1989)

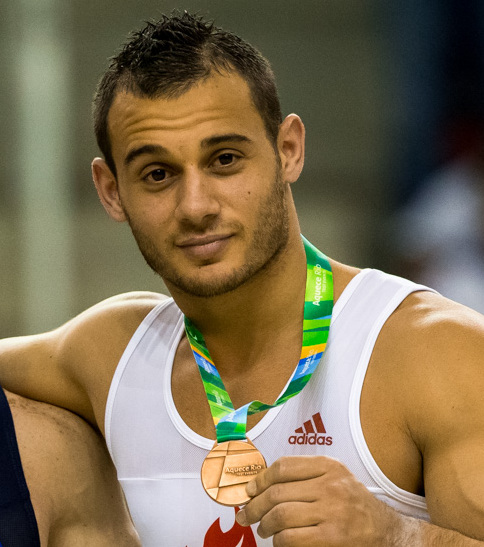
- Aït Saïd at the 2016 Olympic Test Event

Personal information
- Nickname: Sam
- Born: 1 November 1989 (age 37) Champigny-sur-Marne, France
- Height: 1.67 m (5 ft 6 in)

Gymnastics career
- Discipline: Men's artistic gymnastics
- Country represented: France; (2004–present)
- Club: Olympique Antibes Juan les Pins Gymnastique
- Head coach: Kévin Depuis
- Former coach: Rodolphe Bouche
- Eponymous skills: Still Rings: Roll backward slowly with straight arms and body to handstand through swallow
Medal record
Representing France
World Championships
Bronze medal – third place	2019 Stuttgart	Rings
European Championships
Gold medal – first place	2013 Moscow	Rings
Silver medal – second place	2010 Birmingham	Rings
Silver medal – second place	2011 Berlin	Vault
Silver medal – second place	2015 Montpellier	Rings
Bronze medal – third place	2010 Birmingham	Team
Bronze medal – third place	2014 Sofia	Rings
Summer Universiade
Silver medal – second place	2011 Shenzhen	Rings
FIG World Cup
Event	1st	2nd	3rd
World Cup	2	2	2
World Challenge Cup	3	4	0
Total	5	6	2

Samir Aït Saïd (born 1 November 1989) is a French artistic gymnast. He is the 2019 World bronze medalist and the 2013 European champion on the still rings. He is also a three-time European silver medalist and a two-time European bronze medalist. He represented France at the 2016 Summer Olympics, 2020 Summer Olympics, and the 2024 Summer Olympics. He was one of France's flagbearers at the 2020 Summer Olympics opening ceremony.

== Early life ==
Aït Saïd was born on 1 November 1989 in Champigny-sur-Marne. He is of Kabyle descent, and he learned the Kabyle language to communicate with the part of his family that still lived in Algeria. He began gymnastics when he was six years old.

== Gymnastics career ==
Aït Saïd joined the French junior national team in 2004. At the 2004 Junior European Championships, he won the bronze medal on the rings and placed fourth with the French team. Then at the 2006 Junior European Championships, he won the gold medal on the rings, and he placed eighth with the French team.

=== 2009–2012 ===
Aït Saïd's first World Championships was in 2009, and he finished seventh in the rings final. At the 2010 European Championships, he helped the French team win the bronze medal, and he won the silver medal on the rings behind Italy's Matteo Morandi. He won the gold medal on the rings at the 2010 Paris World Cup.

Aït Saïd won the silver medal on the vault at the 2011 European Championships behind his teammate Thomas Bouhail. Then at the 2011 Summer Universiade, he won the silver medal on the rings behind Brazil's Arthur Zanetti. He also finished second to Zanetti on the rings at the 2012 Osijek World Challenge Cup.

Aït Saïd fractured his right tibia in three places at the 2012 European Championships during the team final, and he could not compete at the 2012 Summer Olympics. He had surgery and missed six months of training. He still attended the 2012 Olympics as a spectator.

=== 2013–2014 ===
At the 2013 European Championships, Aït Saïd tied for the gold medal on rings with Ukraine's Igor Radivilov. He then won a silver medal on the rings at the 2013 Osijek World Challenge Cup behind Eleftherios Petrounias. He placed sixth in the rings final at the 2013 World Championships.

Aït Saïd won the bronze medal on the rings at the 2014 European Championships. He also helped the French team place fifth in the team final. He helped the French team win a 2014 friendly meet against Belgium and Spain with the highest scores on rings and vault. At the 2014 World Championships, he placed fifth in the rings final.

=== 2015–2016 ===
Aït Saïd won the silver medal on the rings at the 2015 Ljubljana World Challenge Cup. Then at the 2015 European Championships, he tied with Russia's Denis Ablyazin for the silver medal on the rings. At the 2015 World Championships, he helped the French team finish 10th, and he placed fourth in the rings final.

At the 2016 Olympic Test Event, he helped France secure the final team berth for the 2016 Summer Olympics. He helped the French team place sixth in the team final at the 2016 European Championships, and he placed sixth in the rings final. He then won the vault gold medal at the 2016 Anadia World Challenge Cup. In the qualification round of the Olympic Games, Aït Saïd suffered a double compound fracture in his left leg while landing badly on the vault. The volunteers carrying him out of the arena dropped the stretcher, but this did not cause further damage. He had qualified for the still rings final, but he had to withdraw. He had surgery the same day at the Samaritano Hospital.

=== 2017–2019 ===
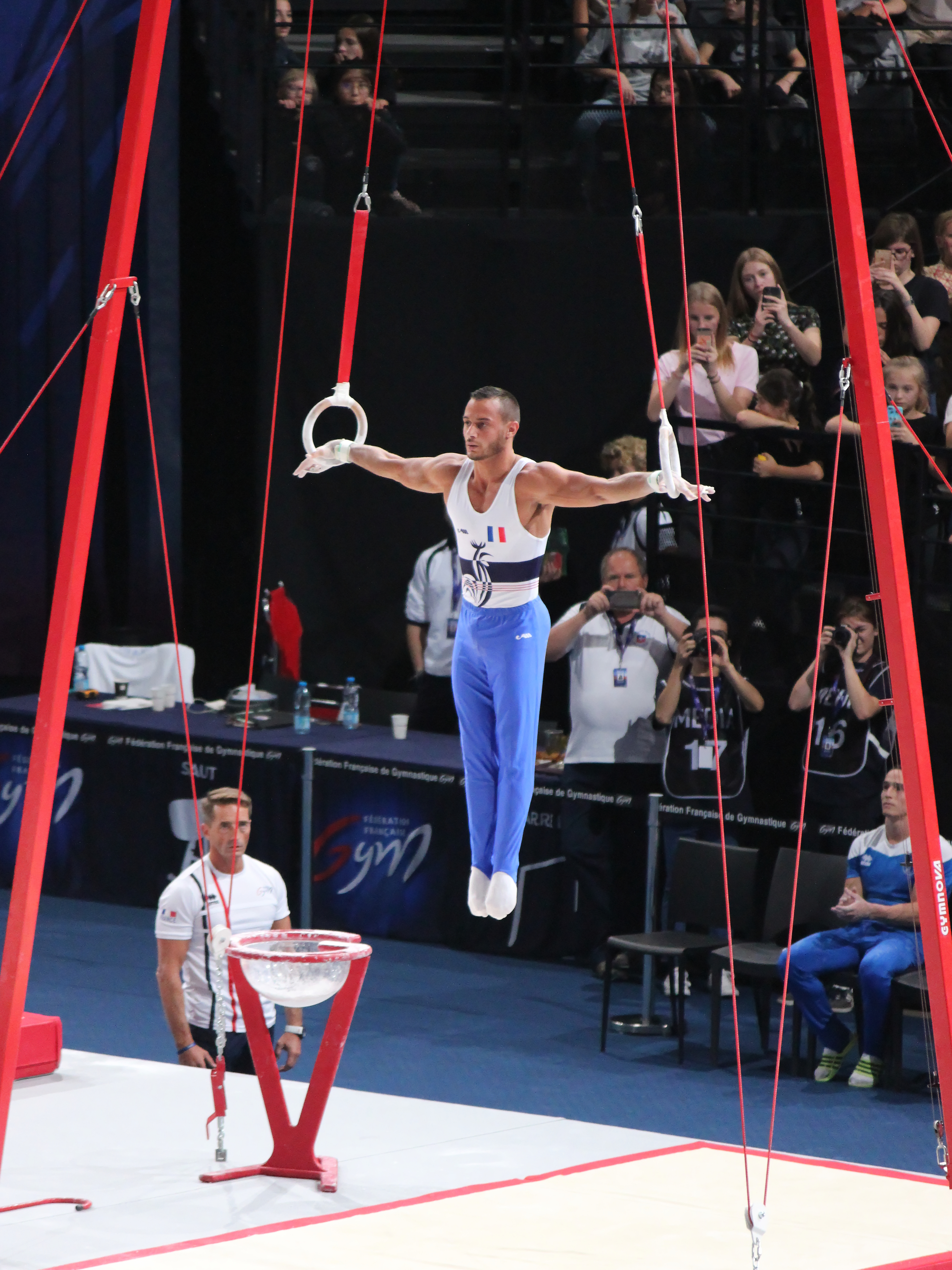
Aït Saïd competing at the 2018 Paris World Challenge Cup

Aït Saïd returned to competition thirteen months later at the 2017 Paris World Challenge Cup and won the silver medal on the rings. After this performance, he was selected to compete at the 2017 World Championships. There, he finished in fourth place in the rings final, missing out on a medal by only 0.008. He won the gold medal on the rings at the 2018 Paris World Challenge Cup.

Aït Saïd placed sixth in the rings final at the 2019 European Championships, and he finished fifth in the rings final at the 2019 European Games. At the 2019 Paris World Challenge Cup, he tied for the gold medal on the rings with Egypt's Ali Zahran. He won the bronze medal on the rings at the 2019 World Championships, his first World medal. Because of this result, he qualified for the 2020 Olympic Games as an individual.

=== 2021–2024 ===
He was a French flag bearer in the opening ceremonies of the 2020 Olympics in Tokyo, and he performed a backflip after the French team walked in. He injured his bicep during training, but he still competed despite his coach suggesting he withdraw. During the qualification round, he competed a new skill that was named after him in the Code of Points. He placed fourth in the still rings final, 0.300 points away from winning a medal.

Aït Saïd finished fourth on the rings at the 2023 Paris World Challenge Cup. He registered for the 2024 FIG World Cup series to attempt to qualify for the 2024 Olympic Games. At the Cottbus World Cup, he won the silver medal on the rings. Then at the Baku World Cup, he won the bronze medal on the rings. He also won the bronze medal on rings at the Doha World Cup. With these results, he earned an individual berth for the 2024 Olympic Games.

== Personal life ==
His father, who was a bus driver, died in January 2019 due to lung cancer. He has a daughter who was born in March 2021.

== Eponymous skill ==
Aït Saïd has a skill on the still rings that is named after him in the Code of Points.

Apparatus	Name	Description	Difficulty (Note: Valid for the 2022–2024 Code of Points)	Added to Code of Points
Still rings	Ait Said	Roll backward slowly with straight arms and body to handstand through swallow	E	2020 Summer Olympics

Olympic Games
Preceded by Teddy Riner	Flagbearer for France (with Clarisse Agbegnenou); Tokyo 2020	Succeeded by Mélina Robert-Michon; Florent Manaudou
