= You Hao =

Chinese artistic gymnast

- Full name: You Hao
- Born: April 26, 1992 (age 34) Xuzhou, Jiangsu, China

Gymnastics career
- Discipline: Men's artistic gymnastics
- Country represented: China
- Club: National Team
- Head coach: Huang Yubin
Medal record
Men's artistic gymnastics
Representing China
Olympic Games
Silver medal – second place	2020 Tokyo	Rings
Bronze medal – third place	2016 Rio de Janeiro	Team
World Championships
Gold medal – first place	2014 Nanning	Team
Gold medal – first place	2015 Glasgow	Parallel Bars
Gold medal – first place	2022 Liverpool	Team
Silver medal – second place	2015 Glasgow	Rings
Silver medal – second place	2019 Stuttgart	Team
Silver medal – second place	2023 Antwerp	Team
Bronze medal – third place	2014 Naning	Rings
Bronze medal – third place	2015 Glasgow	Team
Bronze medal – third place	2023 Antwerp	Rings
National Games
Gold medal – first place	2021 Shaanxi	Team
Gold medal – first place	2025 Guangdong	Team
Silver medal – second place	2021 Shaanxi	Parallel Bars
Bronze medal – third place	2021 Shaanxi	Rings
Bronze medal – third place	2025 Guangdong	Rings

You Hao (Chinese: 尤浩; pinyin: Yóu Hào; born April 26, 1992) is a Chinese artistic gymnast. He competed for the Chinese national team at the World Artistic Gymnastics Championships in 2013, 2014, and 2015. He became the World Champion on parallel bars at the 2015 World Championships.

You competed for China at the 2016 Summer Olympics.

== Gymnastics career ==
You made his senior debut at world level at the 2013 World Artistic Gymnastics Championships in Antwerp, where he finished fourth on parallel bars with a score of 15.500.

At the 2014 World Artistic Gymnastics Championships in Nanning, China, You contributed to the team's first-place finish in parallel bars. Individually, he tied with Denis Ablyazin to win a bronze medal on rings with a score of 15.700.

In 2015, You competed at the 2015 World Artistic Gymnastics Championships in Glasgow. In the team final, You competed again on pommel horse (14.666), rings (15.633) and parallel bars (15.933), contributing to the Chinese team's third-place finish behind Japan and Great Britain. In the event finals, You claimed the world champion title on parallel bars, scoring a massive 16.216, the highest score on this apparatus throughout the whole competition. This was also the only gold medal won by the Chinese men's team at this World Championship. He also won a silver medal on rings behind Greek Eleftherios Petrounias, with a score of 15.733.
