= Gymnastics at the 2018 Mediterranean Games – Men's artistic qualification =

Event at the 2018 Mediterranean Games

Qualification for men's artistic gymnastics competitions at the 2018 Mediterranean Games was held at the Pavelló Olímpic de Reus between 23 and 24 June 2018. Qualification for the individual all-around and individual apparatus finals was achieved through the team competition for athletes that were part of a team. Individual athletes competed qualification routines at the same time as the team competition. The top 22 all-around scores progressed to the all-around final and the top 8 scores on each apparatus progressed to the relevant apparatus final. There was a limit of 2 athletes per country in each final.

== Results ==
=== Individual all-around ===
Rank	Gymnast	Floor (gymnastics)	Pommel horse	Rings (gymnastics)	Vault (gymnastics)	Parallel bars	Horizontal bar	Total	Qual.
1	Néstor Abad (ESP)	14.500	13.750	14.300	14.250	14.450	14.350	85.600	Q
2	Marios Georgiou (CYP)	13.300	13.300	13.800	14.050	14.650	14.200	84.600	Q
3	Ahmet Onder (TUR)	14.300	12.650	14.450	14.550	15.000	13.600	84.550	Q
4	Julien Gobaux (FRA)	14.150	13.800	13.950	14.000	14.250	13.750	83.900	Q
5	Ferhat Arıcan (TUR)	13.950	13.650	13.100	13.833	14.700	13.400	83.400	Q
6	Andrea Russo (ITA)	13.700	13.300	14.250	13.800	14.350	13.600	83.000	Q
7	Ilias Georgiou (CYP)	13.500	13.400	13.550	12.750	14.250	14.100	81.550	Q
8	Loris Frasca (FRA)	12.800	13.500	13.200	14.900	13.800	13.250	81.450	Q
9	Nicolau Mir (ESP)	13.850	12.850	13.850	13.000	14.300	13.550	81.400	Q
10	Axel Augis (FRA)	13.250	14.100	13.150	13.500	14.250	12.300	80.550	–
11	Alberto Tallon (ESP)	14.150	10.550	14.300	14.450	13.400	13.300	80.150	–
12	Nikolaos Iliopoulos (GRE)	13.250	12.100	13.200	13.500	14.100	13.900	80.050	Q
13	Antonios Tantalidis (GRE)	13.400	14.000	12.350	14.350	12.900	12.850	79.850	Q
14	Marco Sarrugerio (ITA)	13.150	12.050	14.200	13.800	14.200	11.850	79.250	Q
15	Ahmed El Maraghy (EGY)	13.150	12.800	13.350	13.800	12.950	13.100	79.150	Q
16	Tommaso de Vecchis (ITA)	13.700	12.100	13.100	12.250	13.250	13.800	78.200	–
17	Hamza Hossaini (MAR)	13.600	11.500	12.450	14.150	13.750	12.450	77.900	Q
18	Ahmed Abdelrahman (EGY)	13.300	13.000	12.550	13.200	13.150	12.650	77.850	Q
19	Simao Almeida (POR)	13.000	10.450	13.600	14.050	13.350	12.850	77.300	Q
20	Sercan Demir (TUR)	12.750	12.050	13.050	13.250	13.250	12.800	77.150	–
21	Michalis Krasias (CYP)	13.200	13.200	12.650	13.250	13.100	11.200	76.600	–
22	Georgios Chatziefstathiou (GRE)	11.550	12.950	12.850	12.750	12.900	12.850	75.850	–
23	Kevin Crovetto (MON)	12.200	11.800	12.050	13.100	12.400	12.750	74.300	Q
24	Bojan Dejanovic (SRB)	13.150	12.700	11.200	13.450	11.850	11.650	74.000	Q
25	Luka Bojanc (SLO)	10.800	11.800	12.450	13.050	12.900	11.950	72.950	Q
26	Matija Baron (CRO)	11.400	13.950	9.900	10.650	11.750	11.000	68.650	Q
27	Andraz Lamut (SLO)	12.000	6.900	11.250	11.200	12.850	11.400	65.600	Q
28	Jakov Vlahek (CRO)	7.150	13.450	5.850	10.800	11.400	6.450	55.100	Q

=== Floor Exercise ===
Rank	Gymnast	D Score	E Score	Pen.	Total	Qual.
1	Néstor Abad (ESP)	5.8	8.700		14.500	Q
2	Rayderley Zapata (ESP)	5.8	8.500		14.300	Q
3	Ahmet Onder (TUR)	6.0	8.300		14.300	Q
4	Alberto Tallon (ESP)	5.6	8.550		14.150	–
5	Julien Gobaux (FRA)	5.7	8.450		14.150	Q
6	Christoforos Konstantinidis (GRE)	5.6	8.350	0.100	13.950	Q
7	Ferhat Arıcan (TUR)	5.6	8.350		13.950	Q
8	Rok Klavora (SLO)	5.5	8.350		13.950	Q
9	Nicolau Mir (ESP)	5.8	8.050		13.850	–
10	Luka Terbovsek (SLO)	5.6	8.150		13.750	Q
11	Andrea Russo (ITA)	5.3	8.500	0.100	13.700	R1
12	Tommaso de Vecchis (ITA)	5.3	8.400		13.700	R2

=== Pommel Horse ===
Rank	Gymnast	D Score	E Score	Pen.	Total	Qual.
1	Cyril Tommasone (FRA)	6.1	8.750		14.850	Q
2	Robert Seligman (CRO)	5.8	8.900		14.700	Q
3	Marios Georgiou (CYP)	5.7	8.900		14.600	Q
4	Sašo Bertoncelj (SLO)	5.7	8.800		14.500	Q
5	Axel Augis (FRA)	5.4	8.700		14.100	Q
6	Antonios Tantalidis (GRE)	5.8	8.200		14.000	Q
7	Matija Baron (CRO)	5.8	8.150		13.950	Q
8	Julien Gobaux (FRA)	5.2	8.600		13.800	–
9	Néstor Abad (ESP)	5.5	8.250		13.750	Q
10	Mohamed Aouicha (ALG)	5.3	8.400		13.700	R1
11	Ferhat Arıcan (TUR)	6.1	7.550		13.650	R2

=== Rings ===
Rank	Gymnast	D Score	E Score	Pen.	Total	Qual.
1	İbrahim Çolak (TUR)	6.2	8.950		15.150	Q
2	Marco Lodadio (ITA)	6.3	8.500		14.800	Q
3	Ahmet Önder (TUR)	6.0	8.450		14.450	Q
4	Ali Zahran (EGY)	6.2	8.200		14.400	Q
5	Néstor Abad (ESP)	5.2	9.100		14.300	Q
6	Alberto Tallon (ESP)	5.5	8.800		14.300	Q
7	Andrea Russo (ITA)	5.7	8.550		14.250	Q
8	Marco Sarrugerio (ITA)	5.5	8.700		14.200	–
9	Julien Gobaux (FRA)	5.2	8.750		13.950	Q
10	Rayderley Zapata (ESP)	5.7	8.200		13.900	–
11	Nicolau Mir (ESP)	5.1	8.750		13.850	–
12	Marios Georgiou (CYP)	5.0	8.800		13.800	R1
13	Simao Almeida (POR)	5.2	8.400		13.600	R2

=== Vault ===
Rank	Gymnast	Vault 1				Vault 2				Total	Qual.
Rank	Gymnast	D Score	E Score	Pen.	Score 1	D Score	E Score	Pen.	Score 2	Total	Qual.
1	Ahmet Onder (TUR)	5.2	9.350		14.550	5.2	9.000		14.200	14.375	Q
2	Ferhat Arıcan (TUR)	5.2	9.400		14.600	5.2	8.500		13.700	14.150	Q
3	Loris Frasca (FRA)	5.6	9.300		14.900	5.2	7.850	0.100	12.950	13.925	Q
4	Ahmed Elmaraghy (EGY)	4.8	9.000		13.800	5.2	8.550		13.750	13.775	Q
5	Nicolau Mir (ESP)	5.2	7.900	0.100	13.000	5.2	9.050		14.250	13.625	Q
6	Hamza Hossaini (MAR)	5.2	9.050	0.100	14.150	4.8	7.850		12.650	13.400	Q
7	Kyriakou Neofytos (CYP)	4.8	9.150		13.950	4.4	7.950		12.350	13.150	Q

=== Parallel Bars ===
Rank	Gymnast	D Score	E Score	Pen.	Total	Qual.
1	Ahmet Onder (TUR)	6.4	8.600		15.000	Q
2	Ferhat Arıcan (TUR)	6.2	8.500		14.700	Q
3	Marios Georgiou (CYP)	5.6	9.050		14.650	Q
4	Néstor Abad (ESP)	5.5	8.950		14.340	Q
5	Andrea Russo (ITA)	5.7	8.650		14.350	Q
6	Nicolau Mir (ESP)	5.5	8.800		14.300	Q
7	Ilias Georgiou (CYP)	5.4	8.850		14.250	Q
8	Julien Gobaux (FRA)	5.6	8.650		14.250	Q
9	Axel Augis (FRA)	5.7	8.550		14.250	R1
10	Marco Sarrugerio (ITA)	5.5	8.700		14.200	R2

=== Horizontal Bar ===
Rank	Gymnast	D Score	E Score	Pen.	Total	Qual.
1	Néstor Abad (ESP)	5.8	8.550		14,350	Q
2	Ümit Şamiloğlu (TUR)	5.5	8.750		14.250	Q
3	Marios Georgiou (CYP)	5.4	8.800		14.200	Q
4	Vlasios Maras (GRE)	5.8	8.400		14.200	Q
5	Ilias Georgiou (CYP)	5.2	8.900		14.100	Q
6	Paul Degouy (FRA)	5.7	8.300		14.000	Q
7	Nikolaos Iliopoulos (GRE)	5.8	8.100		13.900	Q
8	Tommaso de Vecchis (ITA)	5.6	8.200		13.800	Q
9	Julien Gobaux (FRA)	5.1	8.650		13.750	R1
10	Andrea Russo (ITA)	5.4	8.200		13.600	R2
