= Artistic gymnastics at the 2018 Mediterranean Games =

- Venue: Pavelló Olímpic de Reus
- Dates: 23–26 June
- Competitors: 98 from 15 nations

The artistic gymnastics competitions at the 2018 Mediterranean Games in Reus took place between 23 and 26 June at the Pavelló Olímpic de Reus.

Athletes competed in 14 events.

== Schedule ==
Q	Qualification	F	Final

Event↓/Date →	Sun 23	Sat 24	Mon 25	Tue 26
Men's individual all-around	Q		F	
Men's team all-around	F			
Men's vault	Q			F
Men's floor	Q			F
Men's pommel horse	Q			F
Men's rings	Q			F
Men's parallel bars	Q			F
Men's horizontal bar	Q			F
Women's individual all-around	Q		F	
Women's team all-around	F			
Women's vault	Q			F
Women's floor	Q			F
Women's uneven bars	Q			F
Women's balance beam	Q			F

== Medalists ==
=== Men ===
Event	Gold	Silver	Bronze
Team all-around	Spain; Alberto Tallón; Néstor Abad; Thierno Diallo; Nicolau Mir; Rayderley Zapata	Turkey; Ümit Şamiloğlu; Ferhat Arıcan; Sercan Demir; Ahmet Önder; İbrahim Çolak	France; Cyril Tommasone; Axel Augis; Julien Gobaux; Loris Frasca; Paul Degouy
Individual all-around	Marios Georgiou; Cyprus	Julien Gobaux; France	Ahmet Önder; Turkey
Floor exercise	Rayderley Zapata; Spain	Ahmet Önder; Turkey	Rok Klavora; Slovenia
Pommel horse	Cyril Tommasone; France	Robert Seligman; Croatia	Marios Georgiou; Cyprus
Rings	İbrahim Çolak; Turkey	Marco Lodadio; Italy	Ali Zahran; Egypt
Vault	Loris Frasca; France	Ahmet Önder; Turkey	Ferhat Arıcan; Turkey
Parallel bars	Ahmet Önder; Turkey	Marios Georgiou; Cyprus	Julien Gobaux; France
Horizontal bar	Marios Georgiou; Cyprus	Ümit Şamiloğlu; Turkey	Néstor Abad; Spain

=== Women ===
Event	Gold	Silver	Bronze
Team all-around	Italy; Lara Mori; Giada Grisetti; Caterina Cereghetti; Francesca Noemi Linari; Martina Basile	France; Sheyen Petit; Marine Boyer; Grâce Charpy; Morgane Osyssek; Louise Vanhille	Spain; Paula Raya; Cintia Rodríguez; Nora Fernández; Helena Bonilla; Ana Pérez
Individual all-around	Lara Mori; Italy	Louise Vanhille; France	Ana Pérez; Spain
Vault	Nancy Taman; Egypt	Tjaša Kysselef; Slovenia	Teja Belak; Slovenia
Uneven bars	Louise Vanhille; France	Paula Raya; Spain	Lucija Hribar; Slovenia
Balance beam	Marine Boyer; France	Giada Grisetti; Italy	Louise Vanhille; France
Floor exercise	Lara Mori; Italy	Göksu Üçtaş; Turkey	Cintia Rodríguez; Spain

== Medal table ==
Rank	Nation	Gold	Silver	Bronze	Total
1	France	4	3	3	10
2	Italy	3	2	0	5
3	Turkey	2	5	2	9
4	Spain*	2	1	4	7
5	Cyprus	2	1	1	4
6	Egypt	1	0	1	2
7	Slovenia	0	1	3	4
8	Croatia	0	1	0	1
Totals (8 entries)		14	14	14	42

== Participating nations ==
Fifteen nations have registered for artistic gymnastics competitions.

- Algeria (5)
- Croatia (3)
- Cyprus (9)
- Egypt (9)
- France (10)
- Greece (10)
- Italy (12)
- Morocco (1)
- Monaco (1)
- Portugal (5)
- Serbia (2)
- Slovenia (10)
- Spain (10)
- Tunisia (1)
- Turkey (10)
