= Gymnastics at the 2020 Summer Olympics – Men's artistic qualification =

Qualification for the men's artistic gymnastics competitions at the 2020 Summer Olympics was held at the Ariake Gymnastics Centre on 24 July 2021. The results of the qualification determined the qualifiers to the finals: 8 teams in the team final, 24 gymnasts in the all-around final, and 8 gymnasts in each of six apparatus finals. The competition was divided into three subdivisions.

== Subdivisions ==
Gymnasts from nations taking part in the team all-around event were grouped together while the remaining gymnasts were grouped into one of six mixed groups. The groups were divided into the three subdivisions after a draw held by the Fédération Internationale de Gymnastique. The groups rotated through each of the six apparatuses together.

- ^{ind}: Individual gymnast from NOC with a qualified team.

	Floor (gymnastics)	Pommel horse	Rings (gymnastics)	Vault (gymnastics)	Parallel bars	Horizontal bar
Subdivision 1 (10:00)	Mixed Group 1 Marian Drăgulescu (ROU); Tin Srbić (CRO); Loo Phay Xing (MAS); Mikhail Koudinov (NZL); David Jessen (CZE); Rhys McClenaghan (IRL)	Ukraine	ROC Aleksandr Kartsev (ROC) ^{ind} Vladislav Polyashov (ROC) ^{ind}	China Liu Yang (CHN) ^{ind} You Hao (CHN) ^{ind}	Mixed Group 3 Bart Deurloo (NED); Epke Zonderland (NED); Artem Dolgopyat (ISR); Alexander Shatilov (ISR); Marios Georgiou (CYP); Omar Mohamed (EGY)	Spain Rayderley Zapata (ESP) ^{ind}
Subdivision 2 (14:30)	Switzerland	Brazil Arthur Zanetti (BRA) ^{ind}	Great Britain	Mixed Group 6 Shek Wai Hung (HKG); Daniel Corral (MEX); Artur Davtyan (ARM); René Cournoyer (CAN); David Huddleston (BUL); Uche Eke (NGR); Eleftherios Petrounias (GRE)	Japan Kohei Kameyama (JPN) ^{ind} Kōhei Uchimura (JPN) ^{ind}	Mixed Group 4 Đinh Phương Thành (VIE); Lê Thanh Tùng (VIE); Tyson Bull (AUS); Milad Karimi (KAZ); David Rumbutis (SWE); Matvei Petrov (ALB); Tomás González (CHI)
Subdivision 3 (19:30)	Germany	Chinese Taipei	Mixed Group 5 Ferhat Arıcan (TUR); Adem Asil (TUR); İbrahim Çolak (TUR); Ahmet Önder (TUR); Ludovico Edalli (ITA); Marco Lodadio (ITA); Carlos Yulo (PHI)	Mixed Group 2 Samir Aït Saïd (FRA); Loris Frasca (FRA); Cyril Tommasone (FRA); Rasuljon Abdurakhimov (UZB); Sofus Heggemsnes (NOR); Robert Tvorogal (LTU); İvan Tixonov (AZE)	United States Alec Yoder (USA) ^{ind}	South Korea Shin Jae-hwan (KOR) ^{ind}

== Results ==
Team/Gymnast	Floor (gymnastics)		Pommel horse		Rings (gymnastics)		Vault (gymnastics)		Parallel bars		Horizontal bar		Total (All-around)	
Team/Gymnast	Score	Rank	Score	Rank	Score	Rank	Score (Note: Gymnasts who wanted to qualify for the vault final performed a second vault, with the average of the two counting for event final qualification. Only the first vault counted for individual and team all-around qualification.)	Rank	Score	Rank	Score	Rank	Score	Rank
Teams
Japan	43.832	2	43.515	3	42.532	2	43.232	5	45.641	2	43.499	1	262.251	1
Daiki Hashimoto (JPN)	14.700	10	14.766	8	13.866	27	14.866	–	15.300	10	15.033	1	88.531	1
Kazuma Kaya (JPN)	13.933	27	14.833	7	14.366	14	13.200	–	15.100	17	14.033	17	85.465	9
Takeru Kitazono (JPN)	14.666	11	13.916	22	13.333	44	14.700	–	14.900	22	14.433	6	85.948	7
Wataru Tanigawa (JPN)	14.466	14	13.833	25	14.300	17	13.666	–	15.241	11	13.400	32	84.906	13
China	43.165	4	43.733	1	41.866	4	44.132	2	46.699	1	42.466	3	262.061	2
Lin Chaopan (CHN)	13.966	26	14.100	20	13.433	41	14.666	–	14.733	25	14.200	11	85.098	12
Sun Wei (CHN)	14.333	17	14.833	6	14.233	18	14.766	–	15.133	15T	14.000	18	87.298	4
Xiao Ruoteng (CHN)	14.866	7	14.300	16	14.200	21	14.700	–	15.400	6	14.266	10	87.732	3
Zou Jingyuan (CHN)	–	–	14.600	12	–	–	–	–	16.166	1	–	–	–	–
ROC	43.066	5	42.899	4	43.633	1	44.258	1	45.524	3	42.565	2	261.945	3
Denis Ablyazin (ROC)	14.300	18	–	–	14.800	7	14.900/14.566; Avg: 14.733	5	–	–	–	–	–	–
David Belyavskiy (ROC)	12.933	59	14.733	9	14.000	23	14.300	–	15.325	9	14.033	16	85.324	10
Artur Dalaloyan (ROC)	13.700	37	13.800	26	14.500	10	14.658	–	15.233	12	14.066	14	85.957	6
Nikita Nagornyy (ROC)	15.066	2	14.366	14T	14.333	15T	14.700/14.866; Avg: 14.783	3	14.966	19	14.466	5	87.897	2
United States	44.065	1	41.866	5	42.099	3	42.799	6	44.766	5	41.166	6	256.761	4
Brody Malone (USA)	13.666	39	13.733	28	14.200	19	14.533	–	14.633	29	14.533	4	85.298	11
Sam Mikulak (USA)	14.466	15	13.900	23	13.866	25	14.133	–	15.433	5	12.866	54	84.664	14
Yul Moldauer (USA)	14.866	6	14.233	17T	14.033	22	14.133	–	13.900	49	12.933	53	84.098	19
Shane Wiskus (USA)	14.733	9	13.366	37	13.866	26	13.000	–	14.700	27	13.700	26	83.365	21
Great Britain	42.598	6	43.666	2	41.499	5	42.766	7	44.666	6	41.399	5	256.594	5
Joe Fraser (GBR)	14.066	23	14.666	11	14.400	12	13.833	–	15.400	7	13.933	19	86.298	5
James Hall (GBR)	13.866	29	14.100	21	13.733	30	14.333	–	14.333	36	14.066	15	84.431	16
Giarnni Regini-Moran (GBR)	14.666	12	12.166	65	13.366	42	14.600/13.400; Avg: 14.000	15	14.933	20	13.100	44	82.831	23
Max Whitlock (GBR)	–	–	14.900	5	–	–	–	–	14.100	40T	13.400	30	–	–
Germany	40.432	11	41.499	6	40.866	7	42.133	10	44.666	7	40.333	7	249.929	6
Lukas Dauser (GER)	13.766	32	13.666	30	13.533	37	13.600	–	15.733	2	13.433	29	83.731	20
Nils Dunkel (GER)	12.933	58	14.133	19	13.600	35T	13.533	–	14.433	34	13.000	50T	81.632	32
Philipp Herder (GER)	13.733	34	13.233	41	13.333	47	14.533	–	14.500	33	13.100	46T	82.432	27
Andreas Toba (GER)	12.833	62	13.700	29	13.733	31	14.000	–	14.100	40T	13.800	24	82.166	30
Switzerland	42.232	8	40.099	8	40.765	8	42.065	11	44.966	4	39.066	11	249.193	7
Christian Baumann (SUI)	13.833	30	12.700	57	13.766	29	13.566	–	15.200	13	12.566	59	81.631	33
Pablo Brägger (SUI)	14.133	22	13.566	33	13.466	39	12.733	–	15.066	18	12.600	58	81.564	35
Benjamin Gischard (SUI)	14.266	19	13.833	24	13.333	46	14.166	–	13.800	50	13.100	43	82.498	26
Eddy Yusof (SUI)	13.500	46	12.466	60	13.533	38	14.333	–	14.700	26	13.366	34	81.898	31
Ukraine	40.332	12	39.498	9	41.198	6	42.532	8	44.299	8	39.633	8	247.492	8
Illia Kovtun (UKR)	12.866	60	13.666	31	12.833	60	13.816	–	14.700	28	13.700	27	81.581	34
Petro Pakhniuk (UKR)	13.566	43	12.866	53	13.466	40	14.100	–	15.333	8	13.400	31	82.731	24
Igor Radivilov (UKR)	–	–	–	–	14.466	11	14.616/13.533; Avg: 14.074	14	–	–	–	–	–	–
Yevgen Yudenkov (UKR)	13.900	28	12.966	47	13.266	51	13.500	–	14.266	38	12.533	60	80.431	43
Brazil	41.166	9	39.400	10	40.666	9	42.166	9	42.433	10	41.432	4	247.263	9
Francisco Barretto Júnior (BRA)	13.000	57	13.200	42	13.200	53	13.466	–	14.000	45	13.833	22	80.699	42
Arthur Mariano (BRA)	12.800	63	–	–	–	–	13.500	–	–	–	14.133	12	–	–
Diogo Soares (BRA)	14.200	20	12.800	54	13.133	55	14.066	–	13.900	48	13.233	37T	81.332	36
Caio Souza (BRA)	13.966	25	13.400	36	14.333	15T	14.600/14.800; Avg: 14.700	7	14.533	31	13.466	28	84.298	18
Chinese Taipei	42.366	7	41.166	7	39.699	11	43.233	4	40.299	11	39.500	9	246.263	10
Hung Yuan-hsi (TPE)	13.233	52	10.766	73	12.633	63	12.966	–	11.500	69	13.000	50T	74.098	60
Lee Chih-kai (TPE)	14.200	21	15.266	1	13.033	57	14.500	–	14.233	39	13.100	46T	84.332	17
Shiao Yu-jan (TPE)	13.833	31	12.900	51	12.833	59	14.333	–	12.100	65	11.800	65	77.799	54
Tang Chia-hung (TPE)	14.333	16	13.000	45	13.833	28	14.400	–	13.966	47	13.400	33	82.932	22
South Korea	43.699	3	37.633	12	40.466	10	43.799	3	39.898	12	39.299	10	244.794	11
Kim Han-sol (KOR)	14.900	5	11.833	70	13.600	35T	14.233/14.433; Avg: 14.333	10	13.666	51	12.800	56	81.032	39
Lee Jun-ho (KOR)	13.733	36	12.900	48T	13.700	32	14.433/14.233; Avg: 14.333	11	14.266	37	13.366	35	82.398	28
Ryu Sung-hyun (KOR)	15.066	3	12.900	48T	13.166	54	14.500	–	11.966	66	13.133	40	80.731	41
Yang Hak-seon (KOR)	–	–	–	–	–	–	14.866/13.866; Avg: 14.366	9	–	–	–	–	–	–
Spain	40.699	10	38.933	11	38.700	12	40.832	12	43.466	9	38.832	12	241.462	12
Néstor Abad (ESP)	13.666	40	11.466	71	11.966	69	13.000	–	14.800	23	13.133	42	78.031	53
Thierno Diallo (ESP)	12.233	66	12.900	50	13.000	58	12.833	–	14.000	46	11.100	70	76.066	56
Nicolau Mir (ESP)	13.533	45	12.600	58	12.400	67	13.866/14.400; Avg: 14.133	13	14.033	43	13.233	37T	79.665	48
Joel Plata (ESP)	13.500	48	13.433	35	13.300	50	13.966	–	14.633	30	12.466	62	81.298	37
Individuals
Ahmet Önder (TUR)	14.600	13	13.333	39	14.366	13	14.333/14.600; Avg: 14.466	8	15.200	14	13.833	21	85.665	8
Adem Asil (TUR)	14.033	24	12.400	61	14.800	6	15.100/14.433; Avg: 14.766	4	14.091	42	14.100	13	84.524	15
Milad Karimi (KAZ)	14.766	8	11.900	68	13.300	49	14.433/13.300; Avg: 13.866	17	13.400	57	14.766	2	82.565	25
Aleksandr Kartsev (ROC)	13.733	35	13.500	34	13.633	34	14.533	–	14.900	21	12.000	64	82.299	29
Ludovico Edalli (ITA)	13.733	33	13.600	32	13.333	45	13.666	–	13.166	60	13.733	25	81.231	38
Daniel Corral (MEX)	13.200	55	13.266	40	13.366	43	13.933	–	14.033	44	13.100	45	80.898	40
Loris Frasca (FRA)	13.700	38	13.766	27	13.100	56	13.500/13.366; Avg: 13.433	20	13.433	56	12.833	55	80.332	44
Ivan Tikhonov (AZE)	13.233	53	13.366	38	14.200	20	13.600	–	12.766	62	13.133	41	80.298	45
Robert Tvorogal (LTU)	13.633	41	12.100	66	13.300	48	13.933/13.400; Avg: 13.666	18	14.500	32	12.766	57	80.232	46
Carlos Yulo (PHI)	13.566	44	11.833	69	14.000	24	14.766/14.658; Avg: 14.712	6	13.466	55	12.300	63	79.931	47
Rasuljon Abdurakhimov (UZB)	12.566	64	12.166	64	12.733	62	13.833	–	14.733	24	13.033	48	79.064	49
Marios Georgiou (CYP)	13.466	50	10.666	74	12.766	61	14.100	–	13.666	52	14.333	9	78.997	50
Omar Mohamed (EGY)	13.233	54	13.000	46	12.500	66	13.800	–	13.300	58	13.033	49	78.866	51
Mikhail Koudinov (NZL)	13.433	51	12.466	59	12.600	64	13.766	–	14.433	35	11.366	69	78.064	52
René Cournoyer (CAN)	11.766	68	12.800	55	13.666	33	13.866	–	12.333	63	13.266	36	77.697	55
David Jessen (CZE)	13.466	49	12.333	62	12.566	65	12.333	–	13.633	53	11.000	71	75.331	57
Uche Eke (NGR)	12.833	61	12.866	52	11.900	70	13.433	–	12.233	64	11.500	67	74.765	58
David Huddleston (BUL)	12.433	65	11.000	72	12.200	68	14.000	–	13.166	59	11.466	68	74.265	59
David Rumbutis (SWE)	12.166	67	12.033	67	11.200	71	13.100/12.333; Avg: 12.716	21	11.733	68	12.533	61	72.765	61
Loo Phay Xing (MAS)	13.100	56	12.266	63	7.700	72	12.466	–	10.200	70	11.766	66	67.498	62
Sofus Heggemsnes (NOR)	–	–	13.066	44	13.233	52	–	–	13.133	61	12.933	52	–	–
You Hao (CHN)	–	–	–	–	14.800	8	–	–	15.666	3	–	–	–	–
Ferhat Arıcan (TUR)	–	–	14.233	17T	–	–	–	–	15.566	4	–	–	–	–
Vladislav Polyashov (ROC)	–	–	14.366	14T	–	–	–	–	15.133	15T	–	–	–	–
Artur Davtyan (ARM)	–	–	14.566	13	–	–	14.733/15.000; Avg: 14.866	2	–	–	–	–	–	–
Tyson Bull (AUS)	–	–	–	–	–	–	–	–	13.566	54	14.433	7	–	–
Artem Dolgopyat (ISR)	15.200	1	12.766	56	–	–	–	–	–	–	–	–	–	–
Lê Thanh Tùng (VIE)	–	–	–	–	–	–	13.100/13.866; Avg: 13.483	19	–	–	13.166	39	–	–
Eleftherios Petrounias (GRE)	–	–	–	–	15.333	1	–	–	–	–	–	–	–	–
Liu Yang (CHN)	–	–	–	–	15.300	2	–	–	–	–	–	–	–	–
Rhys McClenaghan (IRL)	–	–	15.266	2T	–	–	–	–	–	–	–	–	–	–
Kohei Kameyama (JPN)	–	–	15.266	2T	–	–	–	–	–	–	–	–	–	–
Alec Yoder (USA)	–	–	15.200	4	–	–	–	–	–	–	–	–	–	–
Shin Jae-hwan (KOR)	–	–	–	–	–	–	15.100/14.633; Avg: 14.866	1	–	–	–	–	–	–
Samir Aït Saïd (FRA)	–	–	–	–	15.066	3	–	–	–	–	–	–	–	–
Rayderley Zapata (ESP)	15.041	4	–	–	–	–	–	–	–	–	–	–	–	–
İbrahim Çolak (TUR)	–	–	–	–	14.933	4	–	–	–	–	–	–	–	–
Arthur Zanetti (BRA)	–	–	–	–	14.900	5	–	–	–	–	–	–	–	–
Matvei Petrov (ALB)	–	–	14.733	10	–	–	–	–	–	–	–	–	–	–
Shek Wai Hung (HKG)	–	–	–	–	–	–	14.716/13.833; Avg: 14.274	12	–	–	–	–	–	–
Tin Srbić (CRO)	–	–	–	–	–	–	–	–	–	–	14.633	3	–	–
Marco Lodadio (ITA)	–	–	–	–	14.633	9	–	–	–	–	–	–	–	–
Bart Deurloo (NED)	–	–	–	–	–	–	–	–	–	–	14.400	8	–	–
Kōhei Uchimura (JPN)	–	–	–	–	–	–	–	–	–	–	13.866	20	–	–
Epke Zonderland (NED)	–	–	–	–	–	–	–	–	–	–	13.833	23	–	–
Tomás González (CHI)	13.600	42	–	–	–	–	–	–	–	–	–	–	–	–
Alexander Shatilov (ISR)	13.500	47	–	–	–	–	–	–	–	–	–	–	–	–
Marian Drăgulescu (ROU)	–	–	–	–	–	–	13.466/14.533; Avg: 13.999	16	–	–	–	–	–	–
Cyril Tommasone (FRA)	–	–	13.100	43	–	–	–	–	–	–	–	–	–	–
Đinh Phương Thành (VIE)	–	–	–	–	–	–	–	–	11.833	67	–	–	–	–

=== Team ===
Rank	Team	Floor (gymnastics)	Pommel horse	Rings (gymnastics)	Vault (gymnastics)	Parallel bars	Horizontal bar	Total	Qual.
1	Japan	43.832 (2)	43.515 (3)	42.532 (2)	43.232 (5)	45.641 (2)	43.499 (1)	262.251	Q
1	Daiki Hashimoto (JPN)	14.700	14.766	13.866	14.866	15.300	15.033	262.251	Q
1	Kazuma Kaya (JPN)	13.933	14.833	14.366	13.200	15.100	14.033	262.251	Q
1	Takeru Kitazono (JPN)	14.666	13.916	13.333	14.700	14.900	14.433	262.251	Q
1	Wataru Tanigawa (JPN)	14.466	13.833	14.300	13.666	15.241	13.400	262.251	Q
2	China	43.165 (4)	43.733 (1)	41.866 (4)	44.132 (2)	46.699 (1)	42.466 (3)	262.061	Q
2	Lin Chaopan (CHN)	13.966	14.100	13.433	14.666	14.733	14.200	262.061	Q
2	Sun Wei (CHN)	14.333	14.833	14.233	14.766	15.133	14.000	262.061	Q
2	Xiao Ruoteng (CHN)	14.866	14.300	14.200	14.700	15.400	14.266	262.061	Q
2	Zou Jingyuan (CHN)	–	14.600	–	–	16.166	–	262.061	Q
3	ROC	43.066 (5)	42.899 (4)	43.633 (1)	44.258 (1)	45.524 (3)	42.565 (2)	261.945	Q
3	Denis Ablyazin (ROC)	14.300	–	14.800	14.900	–	–	261.945	Q
3	David Belyavskiy (ROC)	12.933	14.733	14.000	14.300	15.325	14.033	261.945	Q
3	Artur Dalaloyan (ROC)	13.700	13.800	14.500	14.658	15.233	14.066	261.945	Q
3	Nikita Nagornyy (ROC)	15.066	14.366	14.333	14.700	14.966	14.466	261.945	Q
4	United States	44.065 (1)	41.866 (5)	42.099 (3)	42.799 (6)	44.766 (5)	41.166 (6)	256.761	Q
4	Brody Malone (USA)	13.666	13.733	14.200	14.533	14.633	14.533	256.761	Q
4	Sam Mikulak (USA)	14.466	13.900	13.866	14.133	15.433	12.866	256.761	Q
4	Yul Moldauer (USA)	14.866	14.233	14.033	14.133	13.900	12.933	256.761	Q
4	Shane Wiskus (USA)	14.733	13.366	13.866	13.000	14.700	13.700	256.761	Q
5	Great Britain	42.598 (6)	43.666 (2)	41.499 (5)	42.766 (7)	44.666 (6)	41.399 (5)	256.594	Q
5	Joe Fraser (GBR)	14.066	14.666	14.400	13.833	15.400	13.933	256.594	Q
5	James Hall (GBR)	13.866	14.100	13.733	14.333	14.333	14.066	256.594	Q
5	Giarnni Regini-Moran (GBR)	14.666	12.166	13.366	14.600	14.933	13.100	256.594	Q
5	Max Whitlock (GBR)	–	14.900	–	–	14.100	13.400	256.594	Q
6	Germany	40.432 (11)	41.499 (6)	40.866 (7)	42.133 (10)	44.666 (7)	40.333 (7)	249.929	Q
6	Lukas Dauser (GER)	13.766	13.666	13.533	13.600	15.733	13.433	249.929	Q
6	Nils Dunkel (GER)	12.933	14.133	13.600	13.533	14.433	13.000	249.929	Q
6	Philipp Herder (GER)	13.733	13.233	13.333	14.533	14.500	13.100	249.929	Q
6	Andreas Toba (GER)	12.833	13.700	13.733	14.000	14.100	13.800	249.929	Q
7	Switzerland	42.232 (8)	40.099 (8)	40.765 (8)	42.065 (11)	44.966 (4)	39.066 (11)	249.193	Q
7	Christian Baumann (SUI)	13.833	12.700	13.766	13.566	15.200	12.566	249.193	Q
7	Pablo Brägger (SUI)	14.133	13.566	13.466	12.733	15.066	12.600	249.193	Q
7	Benjamin Gischard (SUI)	14.266	13.833	13.333	14.166	13.800	13.100	249.193	Q
7	Eddy Yusof (SUI)	13.500	12.466	13.533	14.333	14.700	13.366	249.193	Q
8	Ukraine	40.332 (12)	39.498 (9)	41.198 (6)	42.532 (8)	44.299 (8)	39.633 (8)	247.492	Q
8	Illia Kovtun (UKR)	12.866	13.666	12.833	13.816	14.700	13.700	247.492	Q
8	Petro Pakhniuk (UKR)	13.566	12.866	13.466	14.100	15.333	13.400	247.492	Q
8	Igor Radivilov (UKR)	–	–	14.466	14.616	–	–	247.492	Q
8	Yevgen Yudenkov (UKR)	13.900	12.966	13.266	13.500	14.266	12.533	247.492	Q
9	Brazil	41.166 (9)	39.400 (10)	40.666 (9)	42.166 (9)	42.433 (10)	41.432 (4)	247.263	R1
9	Francisco Barretto Júnior (BRA)	13.000	13.200	13.200	13.466	14.000	13.833	247.263	R1
9	Arthur Mariano (BRA)	12.800	–	–	13.500	–	14.133	247.263	R1
9	Diogo Soares (BRA)	14.200	12.800	13.133	14.066	13.900	13.233	247.263	R1
9	Caio Souza (BRA)	13.966	13.400	14.333	14.600	14.533	13.466	247.263	R1
10	Chinese Taipei	42.366 (7)	41.166 (7)	39.699 (11)	43.233 (4)	40.299 (11)	39.500 (9)	246.263	R2
10	Hung Yuan-hsi (TPE)	13.233	10.766	12.633	12.966	11.500	13.000	246.263	R2
10	Lee Chih-kai (TPE)	14.200	15.266	13.033	14.500	14.233	13.100	246.263	R2
10	Shiao Yu-jan (TPE)	13.833	12.900	12.833	14.333	12.100	11.800	246.263	R2
10	Tang Chia-hung (TPE)	14.333	13.000	13.833	14.400	13.966	13.400	246.263	R2

=== Individual all-around ===
Rank	Gymnast	Floor (gymnastics)	Pommel horse	Rings (gymnastics)	Vault (gymnastics)	Parallel bars	Horizontal bar	Total	Qual.
1	Daiki Hashimoto (JPN)	14.700	14.766	13.866	14.866	15.300	15.033	88.531	Q
2	Nikita Nagornyy (ROC)	15.066	14.366	14.333	14.700	14.966	14.466	87.897	Q
3	Xiao Ruoteng (CHN)	14.866	14.300	14.200	14.700	15.400	14.266	87.732	Q
4	Sun Wei (CHN)	14.333	14.833	14.233	14.766	15.133	14.000	87.298	Q
5	Joe Fraser (GBR)	14.066	14.666	14.400	13.833	15.400	13.933	86.298	Q
6	Artur Dalaloyan (ROC)	13.700	13.800	14.500	14.658	15.233	14.066	85.957	Q
7	Takeru Kitazono (JPN)	14.666	13.916	13.333	14.700	14.900	14.433	85.948	Q
8	Ahmet Önder (TUR)	14.600	13.333	14.366	14.333	15.200	13.833	85.665	Q
9	Kazuma Kaya (JPN)	13.933	14.833	14.366	13.200	15.100	14.033	85.465	–
10	David Belyavskiy (ROC)	12.933	14.733	14.000	14.300	15.325	14.033	85.324	–
11	Brody Malone (USA)	13.666	13.733	14.200	14.533	14.633	14.533	85.298	Q
12	Lin Chaopan (CHN)	13.966	14.100	13.433	14.666	14.733	14.200	85.098	–
13	Wataru Tanigawa (JPN)	14.466	13.833	14.300	13.666	15.241	13.400	84.906	–
14	Sam Mikulak (USA)	14.466	13.900	13.866	14.133	15.433	12.866	84.664	Q
15	Adem Asil (TUR)	14.033	12.400	14.800	15.100	14.091	14.100	84.524	Q
16	James Hall (GBR)	13.866	14.100	13.733	14.333	14.333	14.066	84.431	Q
17	Lee Chih-kai (TPE)	14.200	15.266	13.033	14.500	14.233	13.100	84.332	Q
18	Caio Souza (BRA)	13.966	13.400	14.333	14.600	14.533	13.466	84.298	Q
19	Yul Moldauer (USA)	14.866	14.233	14.033	14.133	13.900	12.933	84.098	–
20	Lukas Dauser (GER)	13.766	13.666	13.533	13.600	15.733	13.433	83.731	Q
21	Shane Wiskus (USA)	14.733	13.366	13.866	13.000	14.700	13.700	83.365	–
22	Tang Chia-hung (TPE)	14.333	13.000	13.833	14.400	13.966	13.400	82.932	Q
23	Giarnni Regini-Moran (GBR)	14.666	12.166	13.366	14.600	14.933	13.100	82.831	–
24	Petro Pakhniuk (UKR)	13.566	12.866	13.466	14.100	15.333	13.400	82.731	Q
25	Milad Karimi (KAZ)	14.766	11.900	13.300	14.433	13.400	14.766	82.565	Q
26	Benjamin Gischard (SUI)	14.266	13.833	13.333	14.166	13.800	13.100	82.498	Q
27	Philipp Herder (GER)	13.733	13.233	13.333	14.533	14.500	13.100	82.432	Q
28	Lee Jun-ho (KOR)	13.733	12.900	13.700	14.433	14.266	13.366	82.398	Q
29	Aleksandr Kartsev (ROC)	13.733	13.500	13.633	14.533	14.900	12.000	82.299	–
30	Andreas Toba (GER)	12.833	13.700	13.733	14.000	14.100	13.800	82.166	–
31	Eddy Yusof (SUI)	13.500	12.466	13.533	14.333	14.700	13.366	81.898	Q
32	Nils Dunkel (GER)	12.933	14.133	13.600	13.533	14.433	13.000	81.632	–
33	Christian Baumann (SUI)	13.833	12.700	13.766	13.566	15.200	12.566	81.631	–
34	Illia Kovtun (UKR)	12.866	13.666	12.833	13.816	14.700	13.700	81.581	Q
35	Pablo Brägger (SUI)	14.133	13.566	13.466	12.733	15.066	12.600	81.564	–
36	Diogo Soares (BRA)	14.200	12.800	13.133	14.066	13.900	13.233	81.332	Q
37	Joel Plata (ESP)	13.500	13.433	13.300	13.966	14.633	12.466	81.298	R1
38	Ludovico Edalli (ITA)	13.733	13.600	13.333	13.666	13.166	13.733	81.231	R2
39	Kim Han-sol (KOR)	14.900	11.833	13.600	14.233	13.666	12.800	81.032	R3
40	Daniel Corral (MEX)	13.200	13.266	13.366	13.933	14.033	13.100	80.898	R4

=== Floor ===
Rank	Gymnast	D Score	E Score	Pen.	Total	Qual.
1	Artem Dolgopyat (ISR)	6.6	8.600		15.200	Q
2	Nikita Nagornyy (ROC)	6.2	8.866		15.066	Q
3	Ryu Sung-hyun (KOR)	6.9	8.166		15.066	Q
4	Rayderley Zapata (ESP)	6.5	8.541		15.041	Q
5	Kim Han-sol (KOR)	6.5	8.400		14.900	Q
6	Yul Moldauer (USA)	5.8	9.066		14.866	Q
7	Xiao Ruoteng (CHN)	6.2	8.666		14.866	Q
8	Milad Karimi (KAZ)	6.4	8.366		14.766	Q
9	Shane Wiskus (USA)	6.0	8.733		14.733	R1
10	Daiki Hashimoto (JPN)	6.2	8.600	0.100	14.700	R2
11	Takeru Kitazono (JPN)	6.2	8.466		14.666	R3

=== Pommel horse ===
Rank	Gymnast	D Score	E Score	Pen.	Total	Qual.
1 (Note: The top three on pommel horse all had a total score of 15.266 points, but in accordance with the FIG's tie-breaking criteria, Lee Chih-kai was placed first due to his E-score (8.866) being higher than that of the other two gymnasts, Rhys McClenaghan and Kohei Kameyama (8.766). McClenaghan and Kameyama had identical D-scores of 6.5, and were thus tied in second place.)	Lee Chih-kai (TPE)	6.4	8.866		15.266	Q
2	Rhys McClenaghan (IRL)	6.5	8.766		15.266	Q
2	Kohei Kameyama (JPN)	6.5	8.766		15.266	Q
4	Alec Yoder (USA)	6.4	8.800		15.200	Q
5	Max Whitlock (GBR)	6.8	8.100		14.900	Q
6	Sun Wei (CHN)	6.3	8.533		14.833	Q
7	Kazuma Kaya (JPN)	6.4	8.433		14.833	Q
8	Daiki Hashimoto (JPN)	6.5	8.266		14.766	–
9	David Belyavskiy (ROC)	6.4	8.333		14.733	Q
10	Matvei Petrov (ALB)	6.5	8.233		14.733	R1
11	Joe Fraser (GBR)	6.3	8.366		14.666	R2
12	Zou Jingyuan (CHN)	5.9	8.700		14.600	R3

=== Rings ===
Rank	Gymnast	D Score	E Score	Pen.	Total	Qual.
1	Eleftherios Petrounias (GRE)	6.3	9.033		15.333	Q
2	Liu Yang (CHN)	6.4	8.900		15.300	Q
3	Samir Aït Saïd (FRA)	6.3	8.766		15.066	Q
4	İbrahim Çolak (TUR)	6.2	8.733		14.933	Q
5	Arthur Zanetti (BRA)	6.2	8.700		14.900	Q
6	Adem Asil (TUR)	6.2	8.600		14.800	Q
7	Denis Ablyazin (ROC)	6.3	8.500		14.800	Q
8	You Hao (CHN)	6.5	8.300		14.800	Q
9	Marco Lodadio (ITA)	6.4	8.233		14.633	R1
10	Artur Dalaloyan (ROC)	6.0	8.500		14.500	R2
11	Igor Radivilov (UKR)	6.0	8.466		14.466	R3

=== Vault ===
Rank	Gymnast	Vault 1				Vault 2				Total	Qual.
Rank	Gymnast	D Score	E Score	Pen.	Score 1	D Score	E Score	Pen.	Score 2	Total	Qual.
1	Shin Jae-hwan (KOR)	6.0	9.100		15.100	5.6	9.033		14.633	14.866	Q
2	Artur Davtyan (ARM)	5.6	9.133		14.733	5.6	9.400		15.000	14.866	Q
3	Nikita Nagornyy (ROC)	5.6	9.100		14.700	5.6	9.266		14.866	14.783	Q
4	Adem Asil (TUR)	6.0	9.100		15.100	5.6	8.833		14.433	14.766	Q
5	Denis Ablyazin (ROC)	5.6	9.300		14.900	5.6	8.966		14.566	14.733	Q
6	Carlos Yulo (PHI)	5.6	9.166		14.766	5.6	9.058		14.658	14.712	Q
7	Caio Souza (BRA)	5.6	9.000		14.600	5.6	9.200		14.800	14.700	Q
8	Ahmet Önder (TUR)	5.2	9.133		14.333	5.6	9.000		14.600	14.466	Q
9	Yang Hak-seon (KOR)	5.6	9.266		14.866	6.0	7.966	0.100	13.866	14.366	R1
10	Kim Han-sol (KOR)	5.6	8.933	0.300	14.233	5.2	9.233		14.433	14.333	–
11	Lee Jun-ho (KOR)	5.6	8.833		14.433	5.2	9.033		14.233	14.333	–
12	Shek Wai Hung (HKG)	6.0	9.016	0.300	14.716	6.0	7.933	0.100	13.833	14.274	R2
13	Nicolau Mir (ESP)	5.6	8.566	0.300	13.866	5.2	9.200		14.400	14.133	R3

=== Parallel bars ===
Rank	Gymnast	D Score	E Score	Pen.	Total	Qual.
1	Zou Jingyuan (CHN)	6.8	9.366		16.166	Q
2	Lukas Dauser (GER)	6.7	9.033		15.733	Q
3	You Hao (CHN)	6.8	8.866		15.666	Q
4	Ferhat Arıcan (TUR)	7.0	8.566		15.566	Q
5	Sam Mikulak (USA)	6.4	9.033		15.433	Q
6	Xiao Ruoteng (CHN)	6.4	9.000		15.400	–
7	Joe Fraser (GBR)	6.6	8.800		15.400	Q
8	Petro Pakhniuk (UKR)	6.6	8.733		15.333	Q
9	David Belyavskiy (ROC)	6.6	8.725		15.325	Q
10	Daiki Hashimoto (JPN)	6.2	9.100		15.300	R1
11	Wataru Tanigawa (JPN)	6.4	8.841		15.241	R2
12	Artur Dalaloyan (ROC)	6.4	8.833		15.233	R3

=== Horizontal bar ===
Rank	Gymnast	D Score	E Score	Pen.	Total	Qual.
1	Daiki Hashimoto (JPN)	6.5	8.533		15.033	Q
2	Milad Karimi (KAZ)	6.4	8.366		14.766	Q
3	Tin Srbić (CRO)	6.2	8.433		14.633	Q
4	Brody Malone (USA)	6.5	8.033		14.533	Q
5	Nikita Nagornyy (ROC)	6.0	8.466		14.466	Q
6	Takeru Kitazono (JPN)	5.9	8.533		14.433	Q
7	Tyson Bull (AUS)	6.3	8.133		14.433	Q
8	Bart Deurloo (NED)	6.5	7.900		14.400	Q
9	Marios Georgiou (CYP)	6.1	8.233		14.333	R1
10	Xiao Ruoteng (CHN)	6.0	8.266		14.266	R2
11	Lin Chaopan (CHN)	6.3	7.900		14.200	R3
