= Gymnastics at the 2022 Mediterranean Games – Men's artistic individual all-around =

Men's artistic individual all-around at the 2022 Mediterranean Games
- Venue: Miloud Hadefi Complex Omnisport Arena
- Date: 28 June 2022
- Winning total: 84.700

Medalists
gold medal	(Turkey) Adem Asil
silver medal	(Spain) Joel Plata
bronze medal	(Cyprus) Marios Georgiou

The Men's artistic individual all-around competition at the 2022 Mediterranean Games was held on 28 June 2022 at the Miloud Hadefi Complex Omnisport Arena.

== Qualification ==
Position	Gymnast	Floor (gymnastics)	Pommel horse	Rings (gymnastics)	Vault (gymnastics)	Parallel bars	Horizontal bar	Total	Notes
1	Ahmet Önder (TUR)	14.250	13.150	13.900	13.950	15.150	13.650	84.050	~~Q~~ WD
2	Adem Asil (TUR)	14.400	13.300	14.600	13.500	14.050	13.800	83.650	Q
3	Nicola Bartolini (ITA)	14.600	13.700	12.900	14.650	14.050	13.250	83.150	Q
4	Omar Mohamed (EGY)	14.000	13.600	14.300	13.850	13.700	13.300	82.750	Q
5	Marios Georgiou (CYP)	13.450	14.200	13.300	13.600	14.100	13.800	82.450	Q
6	Nicolau Mir (ESP)	13.900	12.500	13.100	14.300	14.250	13.350	81.400	Q
7	Lorenzo Minh Casali (ITA)	13.300	12.950	13.300	14.300	14.150	13.250	81.250	Q
8	Mathias Philippe (FRA)	13.350	12.650	13.700	13.300	14.300	13.500	80.800	Q
9	Matteo Levantesi (ITA)	11.300	12.650	13.000	14.400	14.750	13.600	79.700	–
10	Antonios Tantalidis (GRE)	13.700	14.300	12.550	14.200	13.050	11.850	79.650	Q
11	Nikolaos Iliopoulos (GRE)	12.550	12.450	13.500	13.850	13.800	13.350	79.500	Q
12	Joel Plata (ESP)	13.800	13.450	13.350	13.800	12.250	11.850	78.500	Q
13	Thierno Diallo (ESP)	12.500	13.750	12.950	13.650	13.900	11.650	78.400	–
14	Hillal Metidji (ALG)	12.050	12.950	12.500	13.850	13.400	12.750	77.500	~~Q~~ WD
15	Sercan Demir (TUR)	13.450	10.400	13.250	13.150	14.000	13.100	77.350	– Sub
16	Filipe Almeida (POR)	12.950	12.550	12.950	14.000	12.250	12.450	77.150	Q
17	Ahmed Abdelrahman (EGY)	12.200	13.100	11.700	14.050	12.750	13.100	76.900	~~Q~~ WD
18	José Nogueira (POR)	13.200	12.600	12.900	12.250	12.800	12.650	76.400	Q
19	Lais Najjar (SYR)	12.950	13.650	12.500	13.850	10.100	12.600	75.650	Q
20	Léo Saladino (FRA)	12.100	13.500	13.600	13.100	10.900	11.700	74.900	Q
21	Marcelo Marques (POR)	13.100	12.950	11.650	12.850	11.700	11.950	74.200	–
21	Guilherme Campos (POR)	13.350	11.400	12.600	13.600	11.550	11.600	74.100	–
22	Georgios Angonas (CYP)	10.750	11.150	12.150	13.900	12.950	12.900	73.800	Q
23	Zaid Khater (EGY)	11.050	12.950	13.200	10.200	13.300	12.400	73.100	–
24	Mohamed Bourguieg (ALG)	11.200	10.200	12.550	13.700	12.700	12.050	72.400	~~Q~~ WD
25	Kevin Crovetto (MON)	12.450	11.250	11.400	13.150	12.250	11.150	71.650	Q
26	Michalis Chari (CYP)	12.650	11.400	11.750	12.650	11.600	11.500	71.550	–
27	Petar Vefic (SRB)	9.850	11.600	12.400	12.700	12.850	11.500	70.900	Q
28	H'mida Djaber (ALG)	11.400	11.600	12.200	12.950	12.350	9.550	70.050	–
29	Yazan Alsouliman (SYR)	11.850	10.650	11.000	11.950	11.900	10.000	67.350	Q

== Final ==
Rank	Gymnast	Floor (gymnastics)	Pommel horse	Rings (gymnastics)	Vault (gymnastics)	Parallel bars	Horizontal bar	Total
1st place, gold medalist(s)	Adem Asil (TUR)	14.050	13.250	14.950	14.850	14.100	13.500	84.700
2nd place, silver medalist(s)	Joel Plata (ESP)	13.800	13.600	13.300	14.050	13.850	13.350	81.950
3rd place, bronze medalist(s)	Marios Georgiou (CYP)	12.850	12.800	13.700	14.100	14.300	14.050	81.800
4	Omar Mohamed (EGY)	14.100	13.600	14.000	14.450	13.300	12.150	81.600
5	Lorenzo Minh Casali (ITA)	13.150	13.000	13.500	14.600	14.100	13.250	81.600
6	Nicolau Mir (ESP)	13.700	12.350	13.350	14.250	13.950	13.350	80.950
7	Nicola Bartolini (ITA)	14.200	13.100	13.100	13.200	13.950	13.300	80.850
8	Nikolaos Iliopoulos (GRE)	12.900	12.550	13.250	13.800	13.850	13.550	79.900
9	Antonios Tantalidis (GRE)	13.650	14.000	12.700	14.000	13.050	12.450	79.850
10	Sercan Demir (TUR)	13.100	12.250	13.500	13.050	14.250	12.850	79.000
11	Léo Saladino (FRA)	13.550	11.500	13.650	14.750	12.200	12.750	78.400
12	José Nogueira (POR)	13.600	12.250	12.750	13.750	12.800	12.600	77.750
13	Mathias Philippe (FRA)	13.750	10.950	13.400	13.150	13.100	13.250	77.600
14	Georgios Angonas (CYP)	13.150	11.200	12.500	13.900	13.650	12.950	77.350
15	H'mida Djaber (ALG)	13.450	11.600	12.350	13.200	12.700	11.600	74.900
16	Filipe Almeida (POR)	13.200	12.350	12.800	13.100	10.100	12.050	73.600
17	Kevin Crovetto (MON)	12.150	11.400	12.150	13.300	12.300	12.300	73.600
18	Petar Vefic (SRB)	12.950	12.000	12.450	12.650	12.050	11.300	73.400
19	Lais Najjar (SYR)	13.450	11.700	12.000	14.050	13.700	6.550	71.450
20	Yazan Alsouliman (SYR)	12.350	11.900	11.250	10.900	12.450	10.450	69.300
