= Umut (disambiguation) =

Umut is a Turkish given name.

Umut may also refer to:

- Umut (film), a 1970 Turkish drama film
- The University Museum, The University of Tokyo, a museum in Tokyo, Japan

== See also ==
- Ümit, a given name and a surname
