= Gymnastics at the 2018 Mediterranean Games – Men's artistic team all-around =

Men's artistic team all-around at the 2018 Mediterranean Games
- Venue: Pavelló Olímpic de Reus
- Date: 23–24 June
- Competitors: 45 from 10 nations
- Winning total: 250.550

Medalists
gold medal	Néstor Abad; Thierno Diallo; Nicolau Mir; Alberto Tallon; Rayderley Zapata	Spain
silver medal	Ümit Şamiloğlu; Ferhat Arıcan; İbrahim Çolak; Ahmet Önder; Sercan Demir	Turkey
bronze medal	Axel Augis; Loris Frasca; Julien Gobaux; Paul Degouy; Cyril Tommasone	France

The Men's artistic team all-around competition at the 2018 Mediterranean Games was held between the 23–24 June 2018 at the Pavelló Olímpic de Reus. The event also served as qualification for the individual all-around competition and individual apparatus finals.

== Qualified teams ==
The following NOCs qualified a team for the event.

- Algeria
- Croatia
- Cyprus
- Egypt
- Spain
- France
- Greece
- Italy
- Slovenia
- Turkey

== Final ==
The top 3 scores on each apparatus counted towards the total team score. The scores highlighted in bold counted towards the total team score.

Team	Floor (gymnastics)		Pommel horse		Rings (gymnastics)		Vault (gymnastics)		Parallel bars		Horizontal bar		Total (All-around)	
Team	Score	Rank	Score	Rank	Score	Rank	Score	Rank	Score	Rank	Score	Rank	Score	Rank
Spain	42.950	1	39.200	5	42.500	3	42.500	3	42.200	3	41.200	2	250.550	1st place, gold medalist(s)
Néstor Abad (ESP)	**14.500**	1	**13.750**	9	**14.300**	5	**14.250**	8	**14.450**	4	**14.350**	1	85.600	1
Thierno Diallo (ESP)			**12.600**	26			**13.800**	16	**13.450**	17	11.900	30		
Nicolau Mir (ESP)	13.850	9	**12.850**	22	13.850	11	13.625	28	**14.300**	6	**13.550**	12	81.400	9
Alberto Tallon (ESP)	**14.150**	4	10.550	38	**14.300**	6	**14.450**	5	13.400	18	**13.300**	15	80.150	11
Rayderley Zapata (ESP)	**14.300**	2			**13.900**	10								
Turkey	41.000	2	38.350	8	42.700	2	43.150	1	43.550	1	41.250	1	250.000	2nd place, silver medalist(s)
Ümit Şamiloğlu (TUR)	DNS		11.850	34			**14.000**	12			**14.250**	2		
Ferhat Arıcan (TUR)	**13.950**	7	**13.650**	11	**13.100**	21	**14.150**	3	**14.700**	2	**13.400**	14	83.400	5
İbrahim Çolak (TUR)					**15.150**	1			**13.850**	13				
Ahmet Önder (TUR)	**14.300**	3	**12.650**	25	**14.450**	3	**14.375**	4	**15.000**	1	**13.600**	11	84.550	3
Sercan Demir (TUR)	**12.750**	29	**12.050**	33	13.050	22	13.250	23	13.250	22	12.800	22	77.150	20
France	40.700	3	42.750	1	40.300	4	42.800	2	42.350	2	41.000	3	249.900	3rd place, bronze medalist(s)
Axel Augis (FRA)	**13.250**	19	**14.100**	5	**13.150**	19	13.500	20	**14.250**	9	12.300	27	80.550	10
Loris Frasca (FRA)	12.800	27	13.500	12	**13.200**	18	**13.925**	1	13.800	14	**13.250**	16	81.450	8
Julien Gobaux (FRA)	**14.150**	5	**13.800**	8	**13.950**	9	**14.000**	12	**14.250**	8	**13.750**	9	83.900	4
Paul Degouy (FRA)	**13.300**	17			12.900	23	**13.900**	15	**13.850**	12	**14.000**	6		
Cyril Tommasone (FRA)			**14.850**	1										
Italy	40.550	5	37.950	9	43.250	1	42.300	4	41.800	5	40.900	5	246.750	4
Andrea Russo (ITA)	**13.700**	11	**13.300**	16	**14.250**	7	**13.800**	16	**14.350**	5	**13.600**	10	83.000	6
Marco Sarrugerio (ITA)	**13.150**	24	12.050	32	**14.200**	8	**13.800**	16	**14.200**	10	11.850	31	79.250	14
Marco Lodadio (ITA)	12.850	26			**14.800**	2	**14.700**	2						
Tommaso De Vecchis (ITA)	**13.700**	12	**12.100**	31	13.100	20	12.250	31	**13.250**	21	**13.800**	8	78.200	16
Ludovico Edalli (ITA)			**12.550**	27					13.050	25	**13.500**	13		
Cyprus	40.000	6	41.200	3	40.000	6	41.250	6	42.000	4	40.250	6	244.700	5
Marios Georgiou (CYP)	**13.300**	17	**14.600**	3	**13.800**	12	**14.050**	10	**14.650**	3	**14.200**	3	84.600	2
Irodotos Georgallas (CYP)					DNS									
Ilias Georgiou (CYP)	**13.500**	14	**13.400**	15	**13.550**	14	12.750	29	**14.250**	7	**14.100**	5	81.550	7
Michalis Krasias (CYP)	**13.200**	21	**13.200**	17	**12.650**	25	**13.250**	23	**13.100**	24	11.200	34	76.600	21
Neofytos Kyriakou (CYP)	12.150	31	9.850	40			**13.150**	14	12.250	34	**11.950**	29		
Greece	40.600	4	39.050	6	39.600	7	42.200	5	40.300	6	40.950	4	242.700	6
Vlasios Maras (GRE)							**14.350**	6	**13.300**	20	**14.200**	4		
Georgios Christos Chatziefstathiou (GRE)	11.550	33	**12.950**	21	**12.850**	24	12.750	29	**12.900**	29	**12.850**	18	75.850	22
Nikolaos Iliopoulos (GRE)	**13.250**	20	**12.100**	30	**13.200**	17	**13.500**	20	**14.100**	11	**13.900**	7	80.050	12
Antonios Tantalidis (GRE)	**13.400**	15	**14.000**	6	12.350	29	**14.350**	6	**12.900**	27	**12.850**	19	79.850	13
Christoforos Konstantinidis (GRE)	**13.950**	6	DNS		**13.550**	15								
Egypt	39.200	8	38.950	7	40.300	4	27.000	8	38.400	7	38.550	7	222.400	7
Ahmed Abdelrahman (EGY)	**13.300**	16	**13.000**	20	**12.550**	26	**13.200**	25	**13.150**	23	**12.650**	25	77.850	18
Omar Mohamed (EGY)	**12.750**	28	**13.150**	18	12.250	30	DNS		**12.300**	33	**12.800**	21		
Ahmed Elmaraghy (EGY)	**13.150**	23	**12.800**	23	**13.350**	16	**13.775**	16	**12.950**	26	**13.100**	17	79.150	15
Ali Zahran (EGY)					**14.400**	4								
Slovenia	39.600	7	33.200	10	23.700	8	24.250	9	25.750	9	23.350	8	169.850	8
Sašo Bertoncelj (SLO)			**14.500**	4										
Luka Bojanc (SLO)	10.800	35	**11.800**	36	**12.450**	27	**13.050**	27	**12.900**	28	**11.950**	28	72.950	25
Andraž Lamut (SLO)	**12.000**	32	**6.900**	41	**11.250**	32	**11.200**	32	**12.850**	30	**11.400**	33	65.600	27
Rok Klavora (SLO)	**13.850**	8												
Luka Terbovsek (SLO)	**13.750**	10			DNS		DNS		DNS		DNS			
Croatia	18.550	9	42.100	2	15.750	9	32.300	7	30.900	8	17.450	9	157.050	9
Robert Seligman (CRO)	DNS		**14.700**	2	DNS		**10.850**	33	**7.750**	39	DNS		DNF	
Matija Baron (CRO)	**11.400**	34	**13.950**	7	**9.900**	34	**10.650**	35	**11.750**	36	**11.000**	35	68.650	26
Jakov Vlahek (CRO)	**7.150**	36	**13.450**	14	**5.850**	35	**10.800**	34	**11.400**	37	**6.450**	36	55.100	28
Algeria			39.350	4					24.450	10			63.800	10
Hillal Metidji (ALG)			**13.450**	13					**13.600**	16				
Mohamed Aouicha (ALG)			**13.700**	10										
Islem Lettreuch (ALG)			**12.200**	29					**10.850**	38				
