= Ummeed =

Ummeed (lit. 'hope') may refer to:

- Ummeed (1941 film), a Bollywood film
- Umeed (1962 film), a Bollywood Hindi film

== See also ==
- Umid (disambiguation)
- Omid (name), a Persian male given name
