= Umid =

Umid or UMID or Ümid may refer to:

- Unique Material Identifier, for labelling media files etc.
- Unified Multi-Purpose ID, Philippines, an identity card
- Umid gas field off the Azerbaijani coast
- Ümid FK, an Azerbaijani football club

== People ==
- Umid Irgashev (born 1987), Uzbek TV and film actor
- Umid Iskandarov (born 1980), Uzbek actor and director
- Umid Isoqov (born 1978), Uzbek footballer
- Omid (name), sometimes transliterated as Umid

== See also ==
- Ummeed (disambiguation)
