= Gymnastics at the 2020 Summer Olympics – Men's floor =

Olympic gymnastics event

Men's floor at the Games of the XXXII Olympiad
- Olympic artistic gymnastics
- Venue: Ariake Gymnastics Centre
- Date: 24 July 2021 (qualifying); 1 August 2021 (final)
- Competitors: 8 from 7 nations
- Winning score: 14.933 points

Medalists
1st place, gold medalist(s)		Artem Dolgopyat	Israel
2nd place, silver medalist(s)		Rayderley Zapata	Spain
3rd place, bronze medalist(s)		Xiao Ruoteng	China

The men's floor event at the 2020 Summer Olympics was held on 24 July and 1 August 2021 at the Ariake Gymnastics Centre. Approximately 70 gymnasts from 35 nations (of the 98 total gymnasts) competed on floor in the qualifying round.

In the absence of heavyweights such as the three-time world floor champion (2013, 2015 and 2017) Kenzō Shirai of Japan, due to injury, Artem Dolgopyat of Israel won the event on a tie-breaker over Spain's Rayderley Zapata — it is the first Olympic medal for both. Dolgopyat's victory was also the first medal for Israel in artistic gymnastics and the second-ever Olympic gold medal for the country. Xiao Ruoteng of China earned the bronze medal for his third medal of the 2020 Olympics.

The medals for the competition were presented by Alex Gilady, Israel; IOC Member, and the medalists' bouquets were presented by Ali Al-Hitmi, Qatar; FIG Executive Committee Member.

== Background ==
This was the 25th appearance of the event, which was one of the five apparatus events held every time there were apparatus events at the Summer Olympics (no apparatus events were held in 1900, 1908, 1912, or 1920).

== Qualification ==
A National Olympic Committee (NOC) could enter up to 6 qualified gymnasts: a team of 4 and up to 2 specialists. A total of 98 quota places are allocated to men's gymnastics.

The 12 teams that qualify will be able to send 4 gymnasts in the team competition, for a total of 48 of the 98 quota places. The top three teams at the 2018 World Artistic Gymnastics Championships (China, Russia, and Japan) and the top nine teams (excluding those already qualified) at the 2019 World Artistic Gymnastics Championships (Ukraine, Great Britain, Switzerland, the United States, Chinese Taipei, South Korea, Brazil, Spain, and Germany) earned team qualification places.

The remaining 50 quota places are awarded individually. Each gymnast can only earn one place, except that gymnasts that competed with a team that qualified are eligible to earn a second place through the 2020 All Around World Cup Series. Some of the individual events are open to gymnasts from NOCs with qualified teams, while others are not. These places are filled through various criteria based on the 2019 World Championships, the 2020 FIG Artistic Gymnastics World Cup series, continental championships, a host guarantee, and a Tripartite Commission invitation.

Each of the 98 qualified gymnasts are eligible for the floor competition, but many gymnasts do not compete in each of the apparatus events.

The COVID-19 pandemic delayed many of the events for qualifying for gymnastics. The 2018 and 2019 World Championships were completed on time, but many of the World Cup series events were delayed into 2021.

== Competition format ==
The top 8 qualifiers in the qualification phase (limit two per NOC) advanced to the apparatus final. The finalists performed an additional exercise. Qualification scores were then ignored, with only final round scores counting.

== Schedule ==
The competition was held over two days, 24 July and 1 August. The qualifying round (for all men's gymnastics events) was on the first day; the apparatus final was on the first day of individual event finals.

Date	Time	Round	Subdivision
24 July	10:00	Qualification	Subdivision 1
24 July	14:30	Qualification	Subdivision 2
24 July	19:30	Qualification	Subdivision 3
1 August	17:00	Final	–
All times are local time (UTC+09:00).

== Results ==
=== Qualifying ===
Rank	Gymnast	D Score	E Score	Pen.	Total	Qual.
1	Artem Dolgopyat (ISR)	6.6	8.600		15.200	Q
2	Nikita Nagornyy (ROC)	6.2	8.866		15.066	Q
3	Ryu Sung-hyun (KOR)	6.9	8.166		15.066	Q
4	Rayderley Zapata (ESP)	6.5	8.541		15.041	Q
5	Kim Han-sol (KOR)	6.5	8.400		14.900	Q
6	Yul Moldauer (USA)	5.8	9.066		14.866	Q
7	Xiao Ruoteng (CHN)	6.2	8.666		14.866	Q
8	Milad Karimi (KAZ)	6.4	8.366		14.766	Q
9	Shane Wiskus (USA)	6.0	8.733		14.733	R1
10	Daiki Hashimoto (JPN)	6.2	8.600	0.100	14.700	R2
11	Takeru Kitazono (JPN)	6.2	8.466		14.666	R3

Reserves

The reserves for the men's floor final were:

1. Shane Wiskus (USA)
2. Daiki Hashimoto (JPN)
3. Takeru Kitazono (JPN)

Only two gymnasts from each country may advance to the event final. No gymnasts were excluded from the final or as reserves because of the quota.

=== Final ===
Rank	Gymnast	D Score	E Score	Pen.	Total
1st place, gold medalist(s)	Artem Dolgopyat (ISR)	6.6	8.433	0.100	14.933
2nd place, silver medalist(s)	Rayderley Zapata (ESP)	6.5	8.433		14.933
3rd place, bronze medalist(s)	Xiao Ruoteng (CHN)	6.2	8.566		14.766
4	Ryu Sung-hyun (KOR)	7.0	7.533	0.300	14.233
5	Milad Karimi (KAZ)	6.4	8.033	0.300	14.133
6	Yul Moldauer (USA)	5.4	8.133		13.533
7	Nikita Nagornyy (ROC)	6.4	6.966	0.300	13.066
8	Kim Han-sol (KOR)	6.3	6.766		13.066

Gold medalist Artem Dolgopyat and silver medalist Rayderley Zapata finished with identical scores of 14.933 points. According to the FIG's tie-breaking procedure, Dolgopyat and Zapata had identical E-scores (8.433), but Dolgopyat prevailed on his higher D-score (6.6 vs 6.5). Seventh- and eighth-place finishers Nikita Nagornyy and Kim Han-sol, respectively, also tied on total score (13.066 points), and Nagornyy earned the higher placement due to higher E-score (6.966 vs 6.766).
