= Gymnastics at the 2024 Summer Olympics – Men's floor =

Olympic gymnastics event

Men's floor at the Games of the XXXIII Olympiad
- Olympic artistic gymnastics
- Venue: Accor Arena
- Date: 27 July 2024 (qualifying); 3 August 2024 (final)
- Competitors: 8 from 7 nations
- Winning score: 15.000

Medalists
1st place, gold medalist(s)		Carlos Yulo	Philippines
2nd place, silver medalist(s)		Artem Dolgopyat	Israel
3rd place, bronze medalist(s)		Jake Jarman	Great Britain

The men's floor event at the 2024 Summer Olympics was held on 27 July and 3 August 2024 at the Accor Arena (referred to as the Bercy Arena due to IOC sponsorship rules).

== Competition Format ==
The top 8 qualifiers (limit two per NOC) for floor exercise advanced to the apparatus finals.

== Schedule ==
The competition was held over two days, 27 July and 3 August. The qualifying round (for all men's gymnastics events) was on the first day with the apparatus final on the second day.

Date	Time	Round	Subdivision
27 July	11:00	Qualification	Subdivision 1
27 July	15:30	Qualification	Subdivision 2
27 July	20:00	Qualification	Subdivision 3
3 August	15:30	Final	–
All times are Central European Summer Time (UTC+2)

== Qualification ==
Rank	Gymnast	D Score	E Score	Pen.	Total	Qual.
1	Jake Jarman (GBR)	6.6	8.366		14.966	Q
2	Carlos Yulo (PHI)	6.3	8.466		14.766	Q
3	Rayderley Zapata (ESP)	6.3	8.300		14.600	Q
4	Illia Kovtun (UKR)	6.2	8.333		14.533	Q
5	Luke Whitehouse (GBR)	6.5	8.033		14.533	Q
6	Zhang Boheng (CHN)	6.1	8.366		14.466	Q
7	Artem Dolgopyat (ISR)	6.4	8.066		14.466	Q
8	Milad Karimi (KAZ)	6.3	8.133		14.433	Q
9	Shinnosuke Oka (JPN)	5.8	8.533		14.333	R1
10	Ryu Sung-hyun (KOR)	6.6	7.666		14.266	R2
11	Joel Plata (ESP)	5.7	8.466		14.166	R3

Reserves

The reserves for the men's floor final were:

1. Shinnosuke Oka (JPN)
2. Ryu Sung-hyun (KOR)
3. Joel Plata (ESP)

== Final ==
Rank	Gymnast	D Score	E Score	Pen.	Total
1st place, gold medalist(s)	Carlos Yulo (PHI)	6.600	8.400		15.000
2nd place, silver medalist(s)	Artem Dolgopyat (ISR)	6.400	8.566		14.966
3rd place, bronze medalist(s)	Jake Jarman (GBR)	6.600	8.333		14.933
4	Illia Kovtun (UKR)	6.200	8.333		14.533
5	Milad Karimi (KAZ)	6.300	8.200		14.500
6	Luke Whitehouse (GBR)	6.300	8.166		14.466
7	Rayderley Zapata (ESP)	6.200	8.233	-0.1	14.333
8	Zhang Boheng (CHN)	6.100	8.133	-0.3	13.933
