= Umut =

- Pronunciation: Turkish pronunciation: [ˈumut]
- Gender: Unisex
- Language: Turkish

Origin
- Origin: Proto-Turkic
- Derivation: um- + -ut
- Meaning: Hope
- Region of origin: Turkey

Other names
- Variant forms: Umutcan, Umuthan, Umud, Umutefe, Umutali

Umut is a Turkish gender neutral given name meaning hope.

== Etymology ==
Umut comes from the Turkish word umut or ummak, which both derive from the Proto-Turkic *um-, meaning "hope". It is cognate with the Karakhanid um- "to ask for, covet, hope for” and umdu “covetousness, desire”, Old Uyghur umuɣ “an object of desire”, Chuvash ӑмсанма (ăms̬anma) “to want, desire, envy”, Kyrgyz умсунуу (umsunuu) “to hope, expect”, and Yakut умсугуй (umsuguy) “to develop passion, have a fancy for”, which are all derived from the Proto-Turkic *um-.

The name Ümit, which is the Turkish equivalent of the Persian name Omid, originating from the Persian امید (ômêd) and also signifying "hope", is most likely to be a false cognate with Umut.

== Popularity ==
In Turkey, Umut was ranked as the 21st most commonly given name to baby boys in 2020.

== Given name ==
- Umut Akkoyun (born 2000), Turkish tennis player
- Umut Aral (born 1976), Turkish film director, producer, and screenwriter
- Umut Atakişi (born 1981), Turkish Chess Champion
- Umut Bozok (born 1996), French-born Turkish footballer
- Umut Bulut (born 1983), Turkish footballer
- Umut Gündoğan (born 1990), Turkish footballer
- Umut Güneş (born 2000), Turkish footballer
- Umut A. Gurkan, Turkish–American mechanical and biomedical engineer
- Umut Güzelses (born 1987), Turkish-Israeli soccer player
- Umut Meraş (born 1995), Turkish footballer
- Umut Nayir (born 1993), Turkish footballer
- Umut Oran (born 1962), Turkish textile manufacturer and politician
- Umut Özkirimli (born 1970), Turkish political scientist
- Umut Shayakhmetova (born 1969), Kazakh businesswoman
- Umut Sönmez (born 1993), Azerbaijani footballer
- Umut Sözen (born 1990), Turkish footballer
- Umut Taniş (born 2004), Turkish footballer
- Umut Tursun (born 1999), Chinese-Uyghur singer

== See also ==
- Ümit, a Turkish given name and surname
