= Joel Plata =

Spanish artistic gymnast

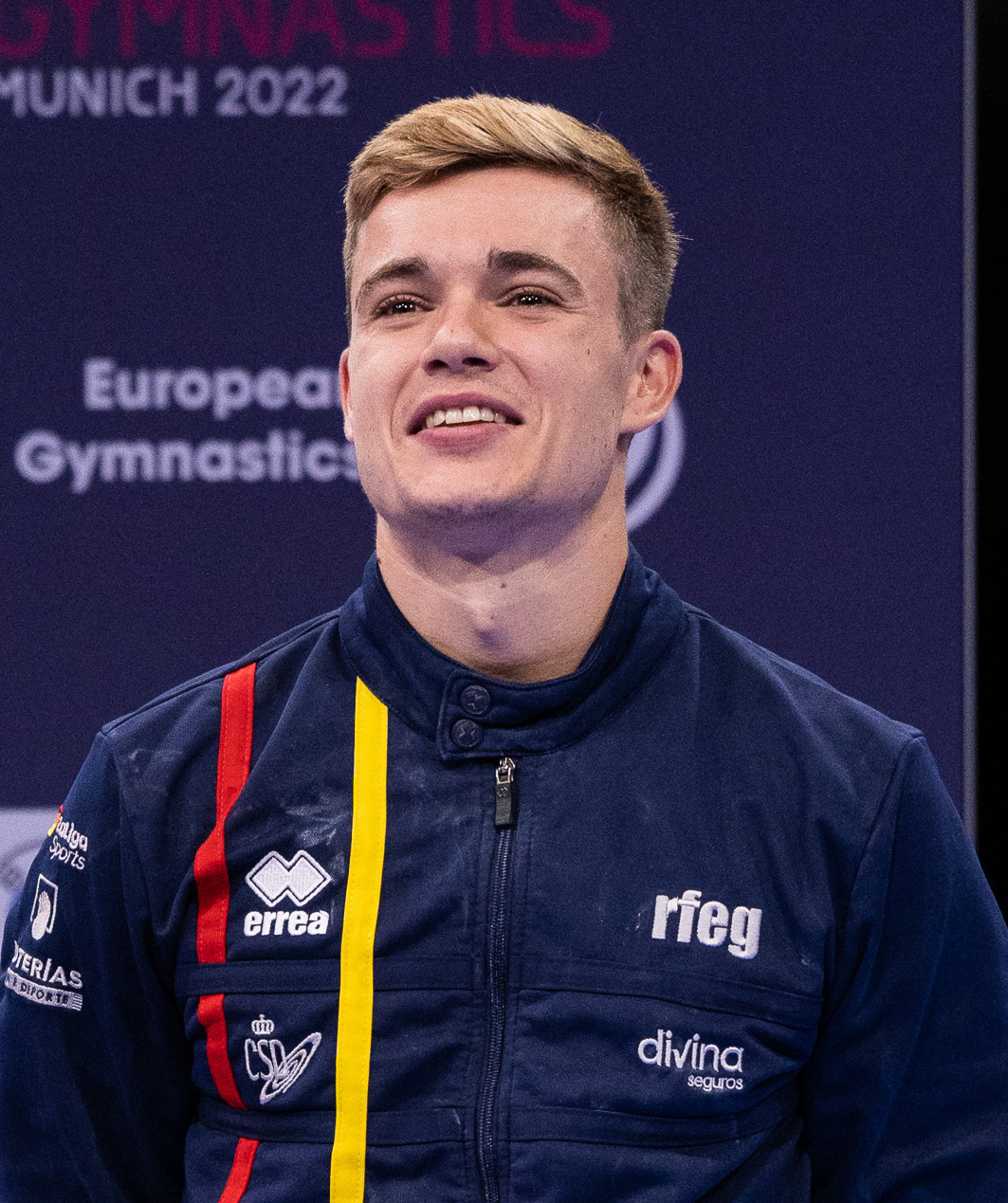
- Plata at the 2022 European Championships

Personal information
- Full name: Joel Plata Rodríguez
- Born: 20 March 1998 (age 28) Barcelona, Catalonia
- Height: 1.67 m (5 ft 6 in)

Gymnastics career
- Discipline: Men's artistic gymnastics
- Country represented: Spain
- Club: Club Gimnastic Sant Boi
Medal record
Representing Spain
Men's artistic gymnastics
European Championships
Bronze medal – third place	2022 Munich	Horizontal bar
Mediterranean Games
Silver medal – second place	2022 Oran	All-around
FIG World Cup
Event	1st	2nd	3rd
World Challenge Cup	1	1	1
Total	1	1	1

Joel Plata Rodríguez (born 20 March 1998) is a Spanish artistic gymnast. He won the bronze medal on the horizontal bar at the 2022 European Championships. He is also the 2022 Mediterranean Games all-around silver medalist. He represented Spain at the 2020 Summer Olympics and at the 2024 Summer Olympics.

== Early life ==
Plata was born on 20 March 1998 in Barcelona. He began gymnastics when he was five years old. Initially, he also did swimming and played football, but he decided to focus fully on gymnastics because it was his favorite.

== Career ==
=== 2016-17 ===
Plata competed with the Spanish team that finished sixth at the 2016 Olympic Test Event, meaning they did not qualify for the 2016 Summer Olympics. He then competed at the 2016 European Championships with the Spanish team that finished eighth. He competed at the 2017 World Championships and qualified for the all-around final where he finished 24th.

=== 2018-19 ===
Plata won a bronze medal on the floor exercise at the 2018 Szombathely World Challenge Cup. He was initially the second reserve for the all-around final at the 2019 European Championships, but he was slated to compete after two other athletes withdrew. He ultimately finished 18th in the all-around final. He then represented Spain at the 2019 European Games and qualified for the all-around final, where he finished 12th. He competed with the Spanish team that finished 11th at the 2019 World Championships, and this result ensured their team's qualification for the 2020 Summer Olympics.

=== 2020-21 ===
Plata was scheduled to compete at the 2020 Birmingham World Cup. However, the competition was postponed to 2021 and eventually canceled due to the COVID-19 pandemic. He was selected to compete at the postponed-2020 Summer Olympics alongside Néstor Abad, Thierno Diallo, and Nicolau Mir. The team finished 12th in the qualification round. Additionally, Plata was the first reserve for the all-around final. He finished sixth in the all-around at the 2021 World Championships.

=== 2022 ===
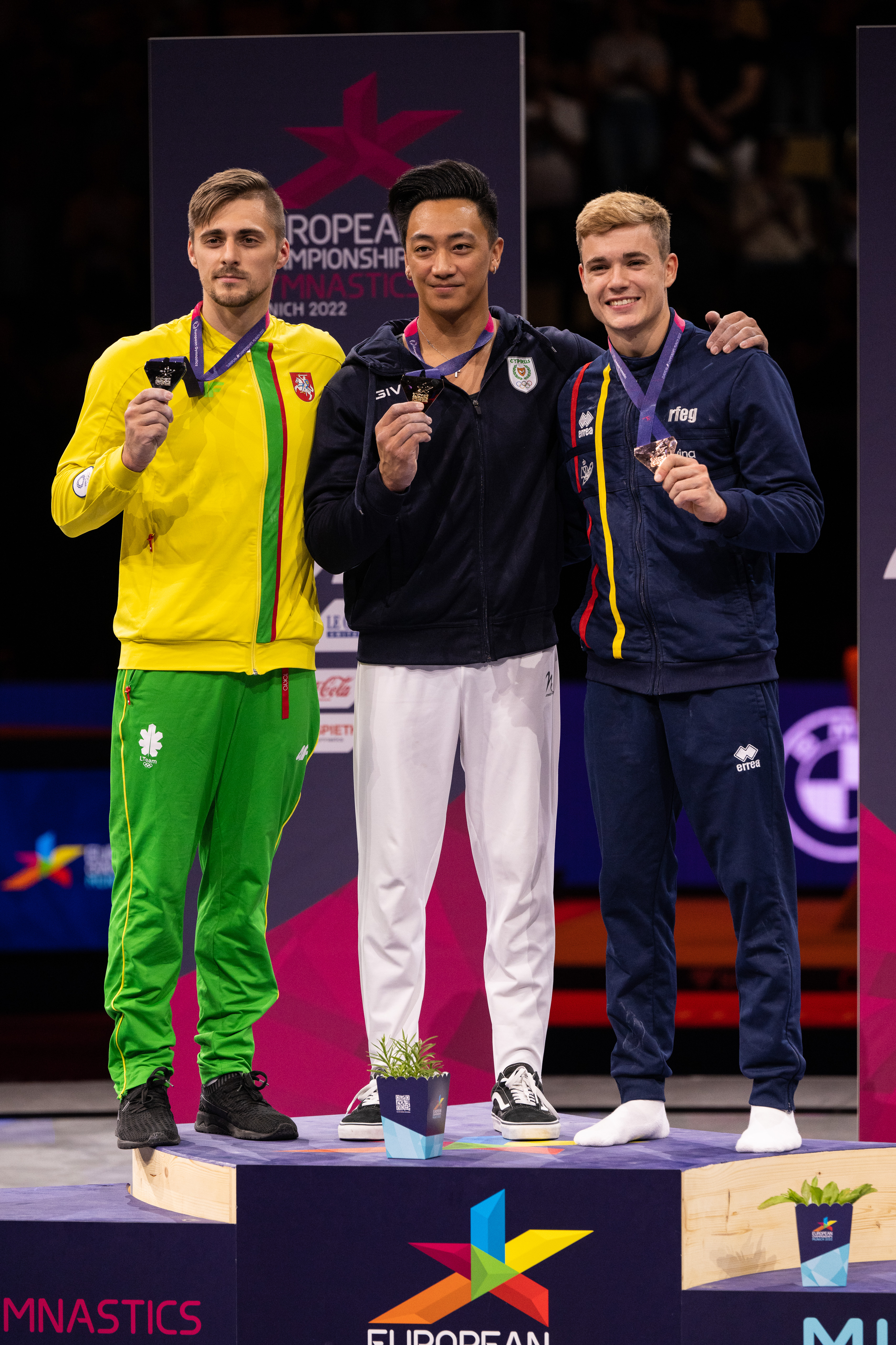
Plata (right) at the 2022 European Championships

Plata represented Spain at the 2022 Mediterranean Games and helped the team finish fourth. Individually, Plata won the all-around silver medal behind Turkey's Adem Asil. Then at the European Championships, he finished fourth in the all-around competition. He also helped Spain qualify for the team final, finishing in eighth place. He then won the bronze medal in the horizontal bar final, behind Marios Georgiou and Robert Tvorogal. Plata and the Spanish team finished sixth at the World Championships in Liverpool. Individually, he qualified for the all-around final, finishing 18th. After the World Championships, he competed at the Swiss Cup Zürich, a mixed-pairs competition, alongside Laura Casabuena, and they placed fourth.

=== 2023 ===
On 16 March 2023, Plata and other members of the Spanish national team were involved in a car accident during a training camp in Anadia, Portugal. The wheel on their van exploded, causing it to roll over multiple times. Plata was the only one ejected from the van because his seatbelt broke, and he was the most severely injured. His injuries included a broken femur that required emergency surgery. He also needed several staples in his elbow and stitches in his eyebrow and lip.

Plata was able to return in time for the 2023 World Championships. He helped the team finish in ninth place, which made them the first reserve for the team final and allowed them to qualify for the 2024 Summer Olympics.

=== 2024 ===
At the Antalya World Challenge Cup, Plata won the gold medal on the horizontal bar and the silver medal on the floor exercise behind Turkey's Adem Asil. Then at the 2024 European Championships, he helped the Spanish team finish fifth. Individually, Plata finished 11th in the all-around competition. He also qualified for the horizontal bar final, finishing eighth.

Plata was selected to represent Spain at the 2024 Summer Olympics alongside Néstor Abad, Thierno Diallo, Nicolau Mir, and Rayderley Zapata. The team finished 12th in the qualification round. Individually, Plata was the first reserve for the all-around final and the third reserve for the floor exercise final.
