= Ümit =

Ümit is a unisex Turkish given name and occasional surname, meaning “hope”, originated from the Persian name, Omid. Notable people with the name include:

== Given name ==
- Ümit Aktan (1949–2025), Turkish sports journalist
- Ümit Aydın (born 1980), Turkish footballer
- Ümit Haluk Bayülken (1921–2007), Turkish diplomat and politician
- Ümit Davala (born 1973), Turkish football coach
- Ümit Kaftancıoğlu (1935–1980), Turkish TV producer
- Ümit Karan (born 1976), Turkish football player
- Ümit Korkmaz (born 1985), Austrian footballer of Turkish descent
- Ümit Kurt (historian), Turkish historian and writer
- Ümit Kurt (footballer) (born 1991), Turkish footballer
- Ümit Yaşar Oğuzcan (1926–1984), Turkish poet
- Ümit Özdağ (born 1961), Turkish politician
- Ümit Şamiloğlu (born 1980), Turkish artistic gymnast
- Ümit Sonkol (born 1982), Turkish basketball player

== Surname ==
- Ahmet Ümit (born 1960), Turkish author and poet
- Tarık Ümit (1947–1995), Turkish intelligence official

== See also ==
- Umut, a Turkish given name
