= Magín Mir =

Spanish footballer

Magín Mir Martínez (born 6 January 1970), known simply as Magín, is a Spanish former footballer who played as a defender.

== Career ==
Born in Palma de Mallorca, Balearic Islands, Magín began his career at hometown team RCD Mallorca, playing five games of the 1988–89 Segunda División season in which his team earned promotion to La Liga via the play-offs. He made only one substitute appearance the following campaign, and did not feature at all in the next, moving on to Segunda División B team FC Cartagena in 1992.

After one season with the Murcian team, he returned to the top flight, playing nine games across the campaign for Albacete Balompié. He did not feature in the following season, and in 1995 he went back to the third tier with Elche CF.

Magín remained in Segunda B for the rest of his career, joining Real Murcia after his first season at Elche. He passed two campaigns there, and spent his last three seasons at CF Sóller, UDA Gramenet and Gimnástica Segoviana CF respectively, tasting relegation with the first and last before retiring in 2000.

== Personal life ==
His son, Rafa Mir, is also a professional footballer, playing as a forward. He is the uncle of artistic gymnast Nicolau Mir.
