= Artistic gymnastics at the 2026 Mediterranean Games – Men's artistic team all-around =

Men's artistic team all-around at the 2026 Mediterranean Games
- Venue: Grottaglie Sports Hall
- Date: 31 August
- Nations: 9
- Winning total: 238.400

Medalists
gold medal	Ferhat Arıcan; Alperen Ege Avcı; Altan Doğan; Mert Efe Kılıçer; Mehmet Ayberk Koşak; İbrahim Çolak	Turkey
silver medal	Tommaso Brugnami; Ivan Brunello; Matteo Levantesi; Stefano Patron; Niccolo Vannucchi; Diego Vazzola	Italy
bronze medal	Daniel Carrión Caro; Thierno Diallo; Sergio Kovacs; Nicolau Mir; Ignacio Yockers; Unai Baigorri	Spain

The men's artistic team all-around competition at the 2026 Mediterranean Games was held on 31 August 2026 at the Grottaglie Sports Hall.

== Qualified teams ==
The following NOCs competed as a team for the event.

- Algeria
- Cyprus
- Egypt
- France
- Greece
- Italy
- Slovenia
- Spain
- Turkey

== Final ==
Rank	Team	Floor (gymnastics)	Pommel horse	Rings (gymnastics)	Vault (gymnastics)	Parallel bars	Horizontal bar	Total
1st place, gold medalist(s)	Turkey	40.100 (2)	39.450 (3)	39.500 (1)	39.950 (3)	40.150 (2)	39.250 (3)	238.400
1st place, gold medalist(s)	Ferhat Arıcan (TUR)		13.950			12.700	12.300	238.400
1st place, gold medalist(s)	Alperen Ege Avcı (TUR)	13.250	10.350	12.350	13.500	12.750	12.750	238.400
1st place, gold medalist(s)	Altan Doğan (TUR)	12.300		12.950	12.500	13.850	12.050	238.400
1st place, gold medalist(s)	Mert Efe Kılıçer (TUR)	13.450	12.450	12.150	13.250	13.550	14.200	238.400
1st place, gold medalist(s)	Mehmet Ayberk Koşak (TUR)	13.400	13.050	14.200	13.200			238.400
2nd place, silver medalist(s)	Italy	40.500 (1)	37.350 (5)	39.450 (2)	40.750 (2)	40.650 (1)	38.300 (4)	237.000
2nd place, silver medalist(s)	Tommaso Brugnami (ITA)	12.400	12.700	12.550	13.500	13.200	12.350	237.000
2nd place, silver medalist(s)	Ivan Brunello (ITA)	13.750	12.000	12.950	12.750	13.050	12.550	237.000
2nd place, silver medalist(s)	Matteo Levantesi (ITA)		12.400			14.000	13.400	237.000
2nd place, silver medalist(s)	Stefano Patron (ITA)	12.850	12.250	12.800	13.150	13.450	12.050	237.000
2nd place, silver medalist(s)	Niccolo Vannucchi (ITA)	13.900		13.700	14.100			237.000
3rd place, bronze medalist(s)	Spain	38.950 (4)	40.200 (2)	38.350 (5)	39.850 (4)	40.100 (3)	36.950 (8)	234.400
3rd place, bronze medalist(s)	Daniel Carrión Caro (ESP)	12.900	10.600	12.850	13.350	12.900	12.150	234.400
3rd place, bronze medalist(s)	Thierno Diallo (ESP)	12.600	13.100	12.300	11.950	13.350	11.650	234.400
3rd place, bronze medalist(s)	Sergio Kovacs (ESP)	11.700		12.750	13.350			234.400
3rd place, bronze medalist(s)	Nicolau Mir (ESP)	13.450	12.900	12.750	13.150	13.850	11.800	234.400
3rd place, bronze medalist(s)	Ignacio Yockers (ESP)		14.200			12.050	13.000	234.400
4	France	40.000 (3)	36.900 (6)	37.000 (7)	40.800 (1)	37.600 (6)	40.800 (1)	233.100
4	Lorenzo Aymes (FRA)	13.150		12.300	13.700	12.700	13.800	233.100
4	Swaimy Bellil (FRA)	13.500	12.150	12.400	13.400	12.600	13.600	233.100
4	Alphonce Burbail (FRA)		11.750	12.300	13.250	11.750	13.400	233.100
4	Antonin Delaye (FRA)	13.350	13.000		13.700	12.300		233.100
4	Enae Fouchard (FRA)	13.050	11.700	12.300			12.950	233.100
5	Greece	38.750 (5)	39.300 (4)	37.700 (6)	39.150 (6)	39.000 (4)	38.000 (6)	231.900
5	Ioannis Chronopoulos (GRE)	12.650	12.950	12.300	12.400	12.950	11.450	231.900
5	Apostolos Kanellos (GRE)	12.000	12.650	11.600	12.700	12.150	13.800	231.900
5	Antonios Tantalidis (GRE)	13.850	13.700	12.050	14.050	12.450	12.750	231.900
5	Christos Tsingelidis (GRE)			13.350				231.900
5	Stefanos Tsolakidis (GRE)	12.250	11.250			13.600		231.900
6	Cyprus	38.700 (6)	35.900 (7)	38.850 (4)	38.600 (8)	37.750 (5)	40.650 (2)	230.450
6	Ilias Georgiou (CYP)	12.500	12.050	11.950		12.650	13.050	230.450
6	Marios Georgiou (CYP)	12.950	12.300	13.300	13.250	13.450	14.250	230.450
6	Michalis Isaias (CYP)	10.750	11.150	11.400	12.650	11.450	12.200	230.450
6	Neofytos Kyriakou (CYP)	13.250	11.550		12.700	11.650	13.350	230.450
6	Sokratis Pilakouris (CYP)			13.600				230.450
7	Egypt	35.250 (8)	40.800 (1)	39.450 (3)	39.000 (7)	37.500 (7)	38.100 (5)	230.100
7	Mohamed Afify (EGY)	12.850	13.700	12.450	12.750	13.150	11.850	230.100
7	Mostafa Ahmed (EGY)	9.150		12.650	12.400	11.650	13.000	230.100
7	Omar El-Shobki (EGY)		13.650	12.900	12.550	12.200		230.100
7	Omar Mohamed (EGY)	11.250	13.200	13.900	13.700	12.150	13.250	230.100
7	Abdelrahman Wakid (EGY)	11.050	13.450				11.650	230.100
8	Algeria	36.000 (7)	35.850 (8)	36.500 (8)	39.800 (5)	36.750 (8)	37.400 (7)	222.300
8	Ahmed-Riadh Aliouat (ALG)	11.500	10.200		12.450	12.600	11.150	222.300
8	Adam Cogat (ALG)	12.050	11.650	11.700	13.650	11.250	12.200	222.300
8	H'mida Djaber (ALG)			11.550	12.700	11.950	12.200	222.300
8	Houssem Hamadouche (ALG)	12.450	11.250	12.350	13.450	12.200	12.350	222.300
8	Youcef Semmani (ALG)		12.950	12.450				222.300
9	Slovenia	26.200 (9)	26.600 (9)	25.600 (9)	11.800 (9)	12.950 (9)	25.950 (9)	129.100
9	Luka Bojanc (SLO)			13.350				129.100
9	Kevin Buckley (SLO)	12.800	13.350	12.250	11.800	12.950	13.000	129.100
9	Anže Hribar (SLO)	13.400						129.100
9	Toni Kastelic (SLO)						12.950	129.100
9	Gregor Rakovič (SLO)		13.250					129.100
