= Omid Rahimi =

American neuroscientist

Omid B. Rahimi

Academic background
- Education: PhD, Uniformed Services University of the Health Sciences, 2000

Omid B. Rahimi is a professor at the Long School of Medicine at the University of Texas Health Science Center at San Antonio (UTHSCSA). He is the assistant course director for the school's Medical Gross Anatomy & Embryology course. In addition, he works as a lecturer and laboratory instructor for Medical Neuroscience. He also co-directs senior medical student electives in Advanced Anatomy of the Back, Head & Neck, Advanced Anatomy of the Thorax, Abdomen & Pelvis, Anatomy of the Newborn, and Advanced Anatomy of the Extremities.

Rahimi has been involved with instruction of Gross Anatomy and Neuroscience to first-year Medical and Graduate students since 2000. He is also active in the development of interactive digital modules aimed to enhance the teaching of gross anatomy (GATEways).

Rahimi's research interests focus on morphological changes in neurons during development and aging. The goal of his work is to determine factors that underlie normal neuronal development and to reveal relationships between deficits in learning and memory observed during aging and changes in neuronal structure.

== Education ==
Rahimi received a Bachelor of Science in Biology from the University of Texas at San Antonio in 1993. He earned a PhD in anatomy & cell biology at the Uniformed Services University of the Health Sciences in 2000, then completed a post-doctoral fellowship in neuroscience before joining the University of Texas Health Science Center in 2001. He joined the Department of Cell Systems and Anatomy at UTHSCSA in September 2004.
