= Axel Augis =

French artistic gymnast

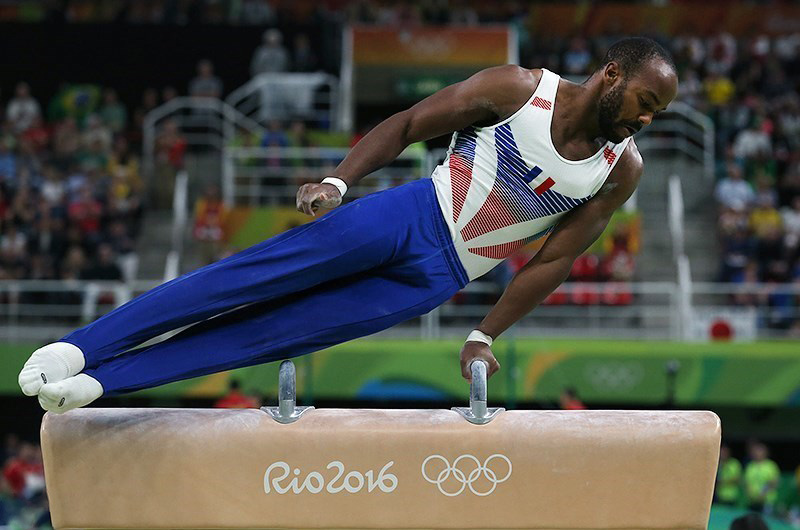
- Augis at the 2016 Summer Olympics

Personal information
- Full name: Axel Louis Augis
- Born: 6 December 1990 (age 35) Courbevoie, France
- Height: 1.72 m (5 ft 8 in)

Gymnastics career
- Discipline: Men's artistic gymnastics
- Country represented: France; (2015)
- Club: Clamart Gym 92
- Head coach: Sébastien Darrigade
Medal record
Men's artistic gymnastics
Representing France
European Championships
Bronze medal – third place	2018 Glasgow	Team
Summer Universiade
Gold medal – first place	2017 Taipei	Horizontal bar
Mediterranean Games
Bronze medal – third place	2018 Tarragona	Team

Axel Louis Augis (born 6 December 1990) is a French male artistic gymnast and a member of the national team. He participated at the 2015 World Artistic Gymnastics Championships in Glasgow, and qualified for the 2016 Summer Olympics.

== Biography ==
He is a member of the French national team. At the “Test Event” in London, he will attempt to qualify in order to secure more than two individual spots for the 2012 London Olympics. At the London Games, he was the second alternate on the French team. Axel Augis began artistic gymnastics at the SCGT (Sporting Club Gretz-Tournan) gymnastics club in Gretz-Armainvilliers.

He competed in the 2016 Summer Olympics in Rio, where he was a finalist in the all-around competition, finishing in 21st place.

He won the bronze medal in the team event at the Artistic gymnastics at the 2018 Mediterranean Games.

He won a bronze medal in the team event at the 2018 European Men's Artistic Gymnastics Championships in Glasgow alongside Edgar Boulet,Loris Frasca,Julien Gobaux, and Cyril Tommasone.
