= Néstor Abad =

Spanish artistic gymnast

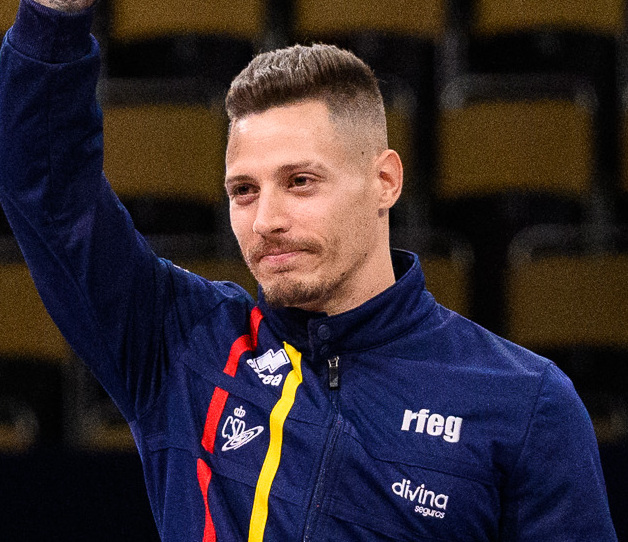
- Abad at the 2022 European Championships

Personal information
- Full name: Néstor Abad Sanjuan
- Born: 29 March 1993 (age 33) Alcoy, Spain
- Height: 1.67 m (5 ft 6 in)

Gymnastics career
- Discipline: Men's artistic gymnastics
- Country represented: Spain (2010–present)
- Club: San Blas
- Head coach: Fernando Siscar
Medal record
Men's artistic gymnastics
Representing Spain
Mediterranean Games
Gold medal – first place	2013 Mersin	Team
Gold medal – first place	2013 Mersin	Vault
Gold medal – first place	2018 Tarragona	Team
Bronze medal – third place	2018 Tarragona	Horizontal bar
Youth Olympic Games
Silver medal – second place	2010 Singapore	Horizontal bar
Bronze medal – third place	2010 Singapore	Vault
Bronze medal – third place	2010 Singapore	Rings

Néstor Abad Sanjuan (born 29 March 1993) is a Spanish male artistic gymnast. He represented Spain at the 2016, 2020, and 2024 Olympics Games. Additionally he competed at the inaugural Youth Olympic Games in 2010 where he won three medals.

== Early and personal life ==
Abad was born in Alcoy in 1993. In 2013 he moved to Madrid for further training. He and his wife Sonia have two children together; a son Eiden and a daughter Lis, who was born while Abad was competing at the 2019 World Championships.

== Gymnastics career ==
=== Junior career ===
Abad competed at the 2010 Junior European Championships where he won gold on rings. Abad competed at the inaugural Youth Olympic Games in 2010. While there he won three medals: silver on horizontal bar and bronze on rings and vault.

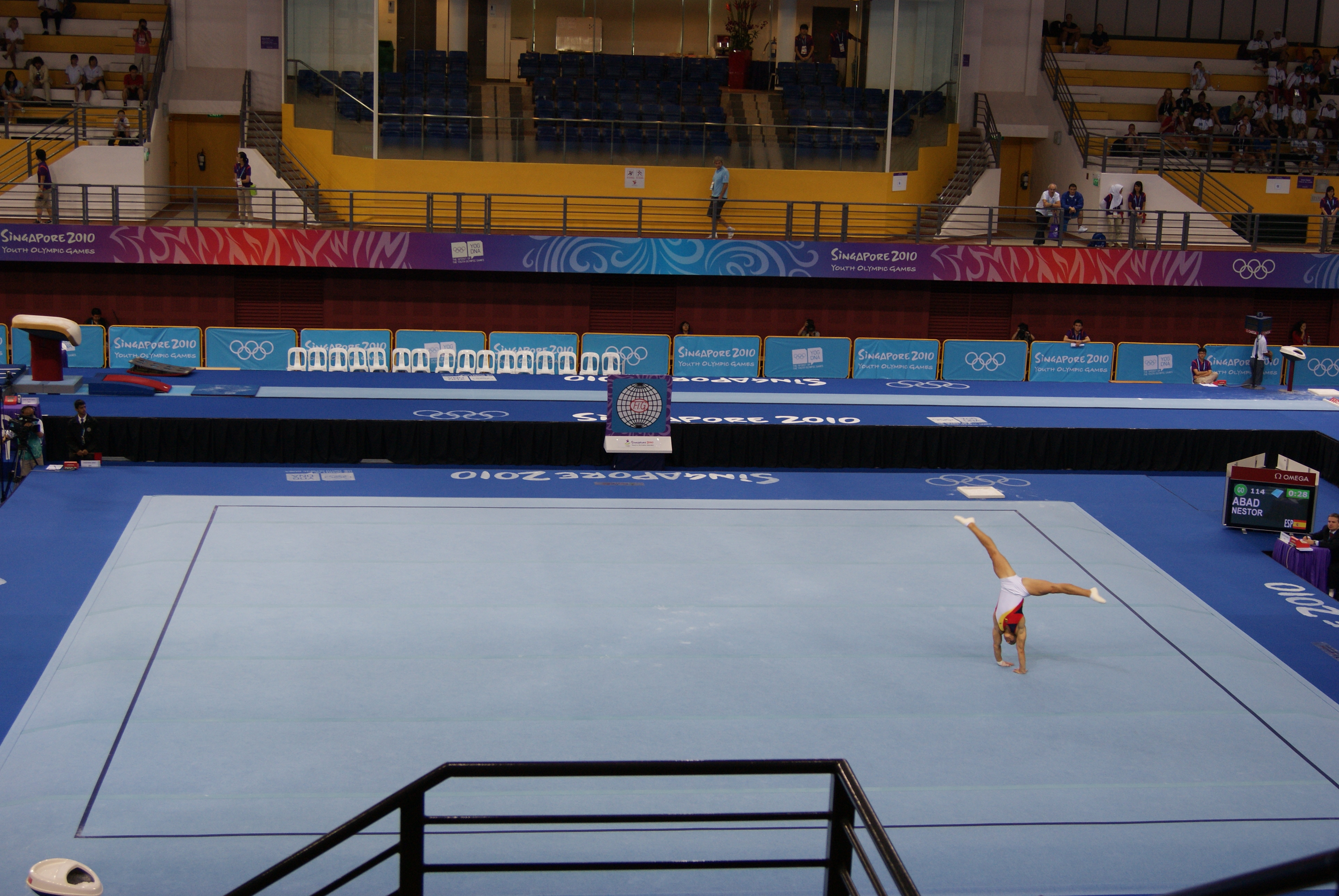
Abad competing at the 2010 Youth Olympic Games

=== First Olympic cycle: 2013–2016 ===
Abad competed at the 2013 Mediterranean Games where he helped Spain win gold as a team. Individually he won gold on vault. Later in the year he competed at the 2013 World Championships where he placed twentieth in the all-around.

In 2014 Abad tore ligaments in his knee.

Abad competed at the Cottbus World Cup in early 2015 where he won bronze on horizontal bar behind Ümit Şamiloğlu and Pablo Brägger. At the 2015 European Games Abad placed sixth in the all-around. At the 2015 World Championships Abad helped Spain finish thirteenth during qualifications.

In early 2016 Abad competed at the Olympic Test Event. He finished twelfth in the all-around and qualified Spain a non-nominative Olympic berth. At the 2016 European Championships he helped Spain finish eighth. Abad was selected to represent Spain at the 2016 Olympic Games alongside Ray Zapata, who had qualified at the previous year's World Championships. During qualifications Abad finished 31st and was the third reserve for the all-around final.

=== Second Olympic cycle: 2017–2021 ===
Abad competed at the DTB Pokal Team Challenge in early 2017 where he helped Spain finish fifth. Abad competed at the 2017 World Championships but did not qualify to any finals.

In early March 2018 Abad competed at the American Cup where he finished ninth. At the 2018 Mediterranean Games Abad helped Spain retain their team title. Additionally he won bronze on horizontal bar. In September he competed at the Paris Challenge Cup where he won bronze on horizontal bar. At the 2018 World Championships Abad finished eleventh in the all-around.

In April 2019 Abad competed at the Tokyo World Cup where he finished seventh. In June he competed at the 2019 European Games where he finished sixth in the all-around. At the 2019 World Championships Abad helped Spain finish eleventh during qualifications. Although they did not qualify for the team final, they qualified a full team to the 2020 Summer Olympics in Tokyo.

Abad competed at the 2020 American Cup where he finished ninth. The remainder of competitions during 2020 were either canceled or postponed, including the 2020 Olympic Games, due to the global COVID-19 pandemic.

In summer 2021 Abad was named to the team to represent Spain at the postponed 2020 Olympic Games alongside Thierno Diallo, Nicolau Mir, and Joel Plata. During the qualification round Spain finished twelfth and did not advance to the team final.

In late 2021 Abad competed at the 2021 World Championships. He finished tenth in the all-around.

=== Third Olympic cycle: 2022–2024 ===
In early 2022 Abad was diagnosed with myocarditis. He was able to compete at the 2022 Mediterranean Games where he helped Spain place fourth. At the 2022 European Championships Abad only competed on three events but helped Spain finish eighth as team. At the 2022 World Championships he helped Spain finish sixth, which matched their previous highest placement record set in 2007.

In April 2023 Abad competed at the 2023 European Championships where he helped Spain finish sixth. Abad competed at the 2023 Tel Aviv World Challenge Cup where he won silver on rings and gold on horizontal bar. At the 2023 World Championships Abad helped Spain finish ninth during qualifications; as a result Spain qualified a full team to the upcoming Olympic Games.

Abad competed at the 2024 European Championships where he helped Spain finish fifth as a team. Additionally he finished seventh in the all-around. In July Abad was selected to represent Spain at his third Olympic Games alongside Thierno Diallo, Nicolau Mir, Joel Plata, and Ray Zapata.
