= Rayderley Zapata =

Spanish artistic gymnast (born 1993)

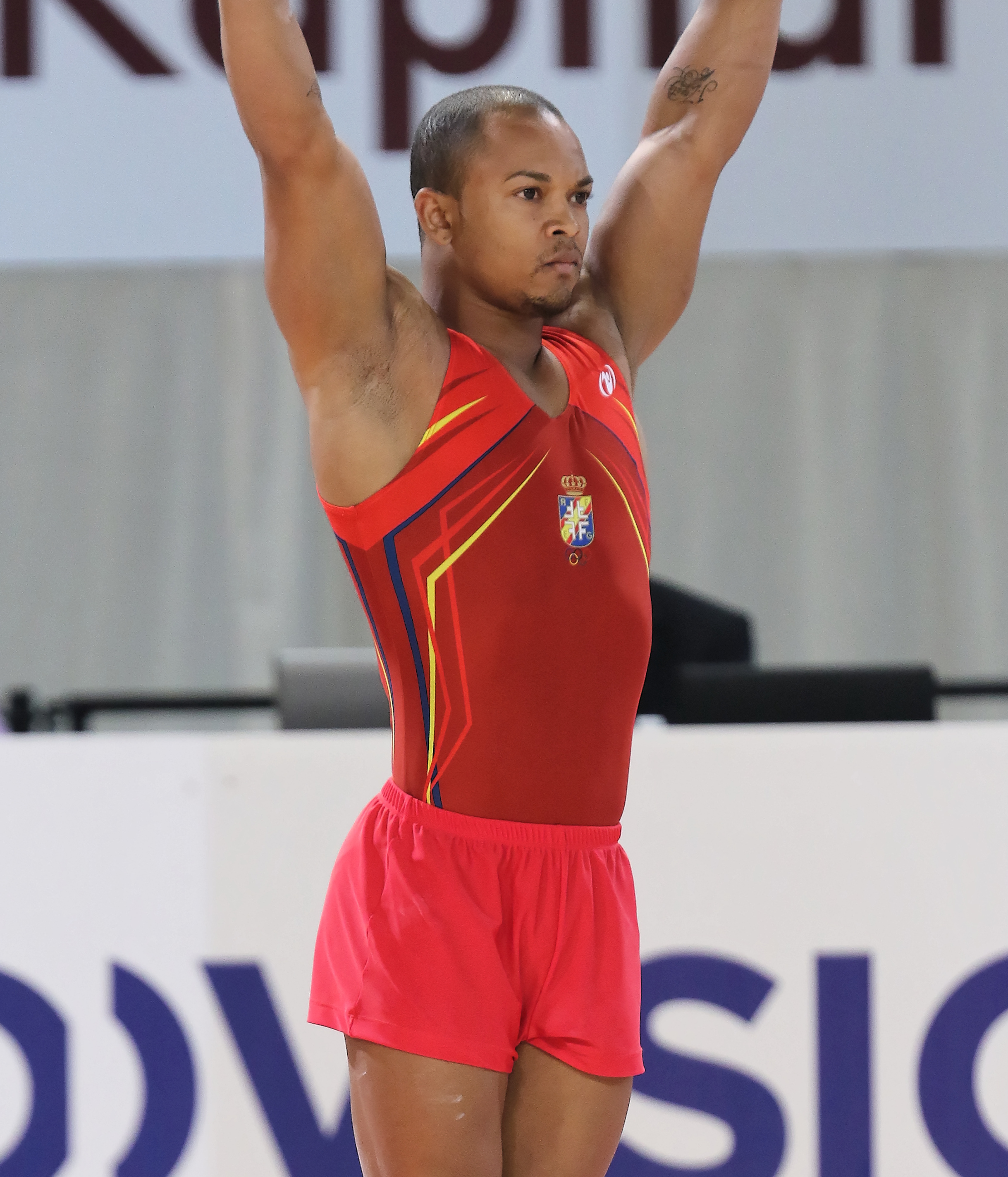
- Zapata at the 2015 European Championships

Personal information
- Full name: Miguel Rayderley Zapata Santana
- Nickname: Ray
- Born: 26 May 1993 (age 33) Santo Domingo, Dominican Republic
- Height: 1.69 m (5 ft 7 in)

Gymnastics career
- Discipline: Men's artistic gymnastics
- Country represented: Spain (2014 – present)
- Club: Isla Lanzarote
- Head coach: Fernando Siscar
- Eponymous skills: Zapata (floor) – double front tucked 1½ twist (F [0.6]); Zapata II (floor) – double front layout 1½ twist (H [0.8])
Medal record
Men's artistic gymnastics
Representing Spain
Olympic Games
Silver medal – second place	2020 Tokyo	Floor exercise
World Championships
Bronze medal – third place	2015 Glasgow	Floor exercise
European Games
Gold medal – first place	2015 Baku	Floor exercise
Mediterranean Games
Gold medal – first place	2018 Tarragona	Team
Gold medal – first place	2018 Tarragona	Floor exercise
FIG World Cup
Event	1st	2nd	3rd
Apparatus World Cup	0	3	3
World Challenge Cup	0	0	2
Total	0	3	5

Miguel Rayderley Zapata Santana (born 26 May 1993) is a Spanish-Dominican artistic gymnast. He is the 2020 Olympic silver medalist on the floor exercise. He is also the 2015 World bronze medalist and the 2015 European Games champion on the floor exercise. He also competed at the 2016 Summer Olympics and at the 2024 Summer Olympics, where he finished seventh on the floor exercise.

== Early life ==
Born in the Dominican Republic, his family moved to the Spanish island of Lanzarote when he was a child. Later, in 2010, he moved to Barcelona to receive further training with Gervasio Deferr and Víctor Cano.

== Career ==
=== 2014–15 ===
At the 2014 Cottbus World Cup, Zapata won his first FIG World Cup medal- a bronze on the vault. He finished eighth on the floor exercise at the 2014 World Championships. After the World Championships, he competed at the Mexican Open and placed tenth in the all-around.

At the 2015 European Championships, Zapata initially placed sixth in the floor exercise, but he was allowed to repeat his routine due to a timing error. He then received a score that would have won the bronze medal, but the judges later added an out-of-bounds deduction they had initially missed, and he ultimately finished fifth. He then won the gold medal on the floor exercise at the 2015 European Games. Then at the 2015 World Championships, he won the bronze medal on the floor exercise and as a result qualified for the 2016 Summer Olympics.

=== 2016–18 ===
Zapata won a silver medal on the floor exercise at the 2016 Cottbus World Cup behind Japan's Naoto Hayasaka. He helped the Spanish team finish eighth at the 2016 European Championships. He then represented Spain at the 2016 Summer Olympics and was the second reserve for the floor exercise final.

Zapata finished sixth on the floor exercise at the 2017 European Championships. He returned to competition after a torn Achilles tendon at the 2018 Mediterranean Games and won gold medals with the Spanish team and on the floor exercise. At the 2018 European Championships, he helped the Spanish team place sixth, and he also finished seventh on the floor exercise. He won bronze medals on the floor exercise at the 2018 World Challenge Cups in Guimarães and Paris.

=== 2019–21 ===
Zapata tied with Great Britain's Dominick Cunningham for the floor exercise bronze medal at the 2019 Melbourne World Cup. He won another floor exercise bronze medal at the 2019 Baku World Cup. He also won silver medals at the Doha and Cottbus World Cups. At the 2019 European Championships, he finished sixth in the floor exercise final.

Zapata won a silver medal on the floor exercise at the 2021 Doha World Cup. He secured an Olympic berth with his results from the prior two years of the FIG World Cup series. At the Summer Olympics in Tokyo, Zapata qualified for the floor exercise final in first place. In the final, he tied with Israel's Artem Dolgopyat for the highest score with 14.933. For the first tiebreaker, Zapata and Dolgopyat had the same execution score, but Dolgopyat prevailed on the second tiebreaker because he had a higher difficulty score. Zapata thus received the silver medal.

=== 2022–24 ===
Zapata helped the Spanish team finish eighth at the 2022 European Championships. He was the first reserve for the floor exercise final. Zapata and the Spanish team then finished sixth at the World Championships in Liverpool.

On 16 March 2023, Zapata and other members of the Spanish national team were involved in a car accident during a training camp in Anadia, Portugal. The wheel on their van exploded, causing it to roll over multiple times, but Zapata was not severely injured. At the 2023 European Championships, he was the third reserve for botht the rings and vault finals. Then at the 2023 World Championships, he helped the team finish in ninth place, which made them the first reserve for the team final and allowed them to qualify for the 2024 Summer Olympics.

Zapata was selected to represent Spain at the 2024 Summer Olympics alongside Néstor Abad, Thierno Diallo, Nicolau Mir, and Joel Plata. The team finished 12th in the qualification round, and Zapata qualified for the floor exercise final in third place. He stepped out of bounds during the floor final and finished in seventh place.

== Eponymous skills ==
Zapata has two difficult tumbling passes named after him in the Code of Points. The first is a double forward flip in a tucked position with a 1.5 twist. The second is the same skill in a layout position.

Apparatus	Name	Description	Difficulty (Note: Valid for the 2022–2024 Code of Points)	Added to Code of Points
Floor exercise	Zapata	Double salto fwd. tucked with 3/2 turn	F	
Floor exercise	Zapata II	Double salto fwd. str. with 3/2 turn	H	2021 Doha World Cup

== Personal life ==
Zapata has a daughter Olympia, born in 2021, and a son Kayro, born in 2023, with his wife Susana.
