= Omid (name) =

- Gender: Male

Origin
- Origin: Persian

Other names
- Alternative spelling: Omeed or Umeed or Ümit (Turkish equivalent)

Omid (Persian: اُمید), also transliterated as Omeed, Umeed or Ümit (Turkish equivalent), is a common Persian, Turkish, and Kurdish male given name, meaning hope.

== Given name ==
- Omid Abolhassani, Iranian football player banned for four years
- Omid Abtahi, Iranian-American actor
- Omid Djalili, Iranian-British stand-up comedian and actor
- Omid Ebrahimi, Iranian footballer
- Omid Kordestani, Iranian-American Google executive
- Omeed Malik, Iranian-American businessman
- Omid Memarian, Iranian journalist and social activist
- Omid Najafi (born 1988), German politician
- Omid Namazi, Iranian-American soccer player
- Omid Nouripour, German-Iranian politician
- Omid Rahimi, American anatomist
- Omid Ravaei, Iranian-British Mathematician
- Omid Ravankhah, Iranian footballer
- Omid Safi, American religion academic
- Omid Scobie, British journalist and writer
- Omid Tahvili, Iranian-Canadian criminal
- Omid Walizadeh, American underground hip hop producer

== Surname ==
- Ghazal Omid, Iranian-Canadian author
- Pierre Omidyar, French-born American entrepreneur and the founder of eBay

== Other uses ==
- Omid, first Iranian-launched satellite, launched on February 2, 2009
- "Omid", an electronic database of human rights violations in Iran, acting as a memorial to the victims executed by the Islamic Republic since it was established in 1979.
- "Omid", a song on Thievery Corporation's album The Richest Man in Babylon
- Apache Omid, an open source transaction processing system for Apache HBase
- M. Omid, pen name of Mehdi Akhavan-Sales, notable contemporary Iranian poet
