= Nicolau Mir =

Spanish artistic gymnast

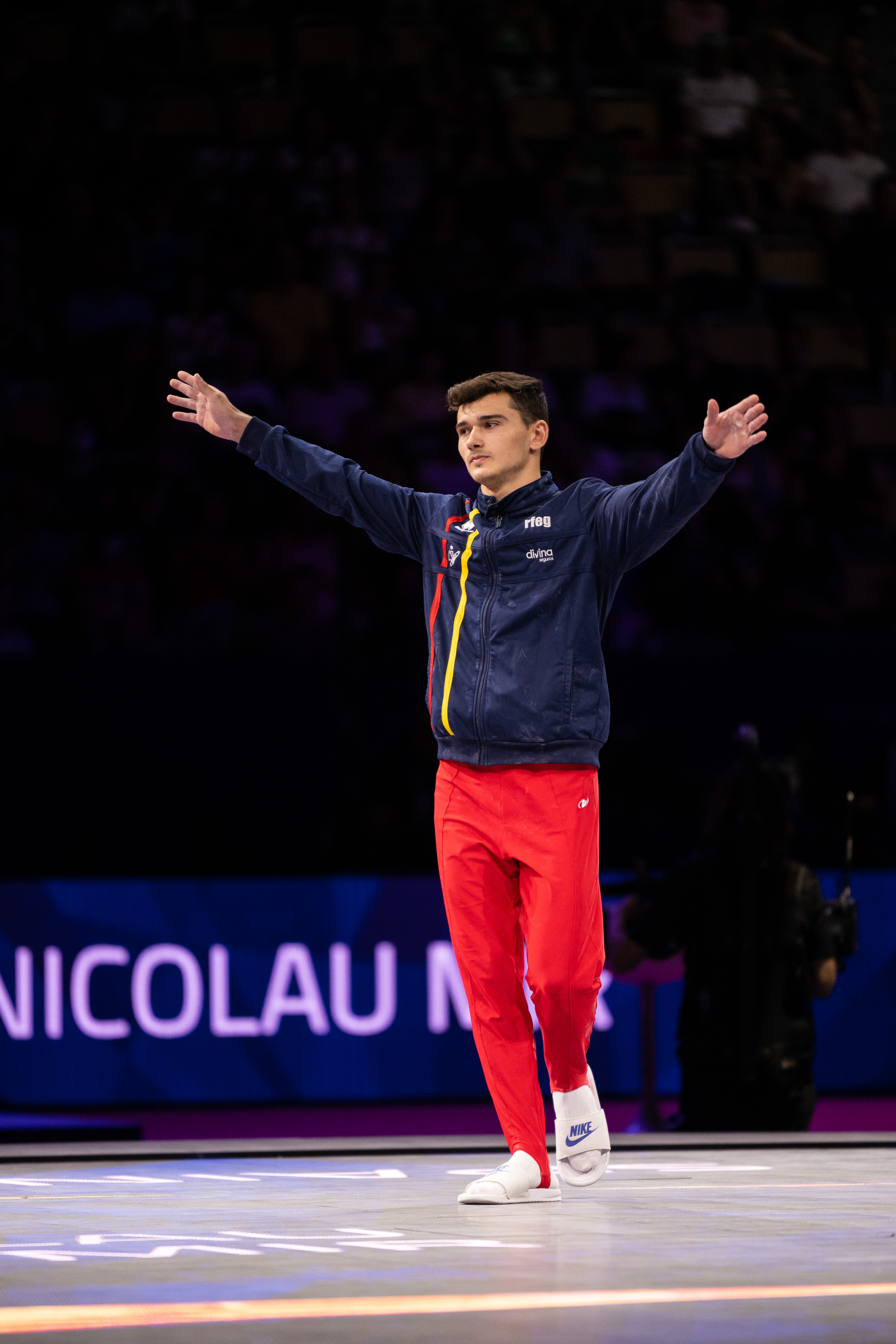

Personal information
- Full name: Nicolau Mir Rosselló
- Born: 10 May 2000 (age 26) Palma de Mallorca
- Height: 1.65 m (5 ft 5 in)
- Relatives: Rafa Mir (cousin); Magín Mir (uncle)

Gymnastics career
- Discipline: Men's artistic gymnastics
- Country represented: Spain; (2017–present)
- Club: Club Esportiu Xelska
- Head coach: Pedro Mir
Medal record
Men's artistic gymnastics
Representing Spain
Mediterranean Games
Gold medal – first place	2018 Tarragona	Team
Silver medal – second place	2026 Taranto	All-around
Bronze medal – third place	2026 Taranto	Team
FIG World Cup
Event	1st	2nd	3rd
World Challenge Cup	1	1	0
Total	1	1	0

Nicolau Mir Rosselló (born 10 May 2000) is a Spanish artistic gymnast. He is the 2026 Mediterranean Games all-around silver medalist. He represented Spain at the 2020 and 2024 Olympic Games.

== Early life ==
Mir was born in Palma de Mallorca in 2000 to gymnastics coaches Pedro Mir and Praxedes Rosselló. His cousin Rafa Mir and uncle Magín Mir are professional footballers.

== Gymnastics career ==
=== 2018–2021 ===
At the 2018 Mediterranean Games Mir helped Spain retain their team title. At the 2018 World Championships he helped Spain finish eleventh during qualifications.

At the 2019 World Championships Mir helped Spain finish eleventh during qualifications. Although they did not qualify for the team final, they qualified a full team to the 2020 Summer Olympics in Tokyo.

In summer 2021 Mir was named to the team to represent Spain at the postponed 2020 Olympic Games alongside Néstor Abad, Thierno Diallo, and Joel Plata. During the qualification round Spain finished twelfth and did not advance to the team final. In late 2021 Mir competed at the 2021 World Championships but did not advance to any individual finals.

=== 2022–2024 ===
Mir competed at the 2022 Mediterranean Games where he helped Spain finish fourth. Individually he finished sixth in the all-around, fourth on floor exercise, sixth on parallel bars, and eighth on horizontal bar. At the 2022 European Championships Mir helped Spain finish eighth as team. Individually he finished fourth on parallel bars. At the 2022 World Championships he helped Spain finish sixth, which matched their previous highest placement record set in 2007.

In Summer of 2023 Mir at the Tel Aviv World Challenge Cup where he won silver on floor exercise behind Krisztofer Mészáros. He next competed at the postponed 2021 World University Games. While there he helped Spain finish tenth as a team. Individually he finished eleventh in the all-around and sixth on parallel bars. At the 2023 World Championships Mir helped Spain finish ninth during qualifications; as a result Spain qualified a full team to the upcoming Olympic Games.

In early 2024 Mir competed at the Antalya World Challenge Cup where he placed first on parallel bars. He next competed at the 2024 European Championships where he helped Spain finish fifth as a team. Additionally he finished seventh on floor exercise. In July Mir was selected to represent Spain at his second Olympic Games alongside Néstor Abad, Thierno Diallo, Joel Plata, and Ray Zapata.
