= Pavelló Olímpic de Reus =

Indoor arena in Reus, Spain

Coordinates: 41.1405°N 1.1121°E

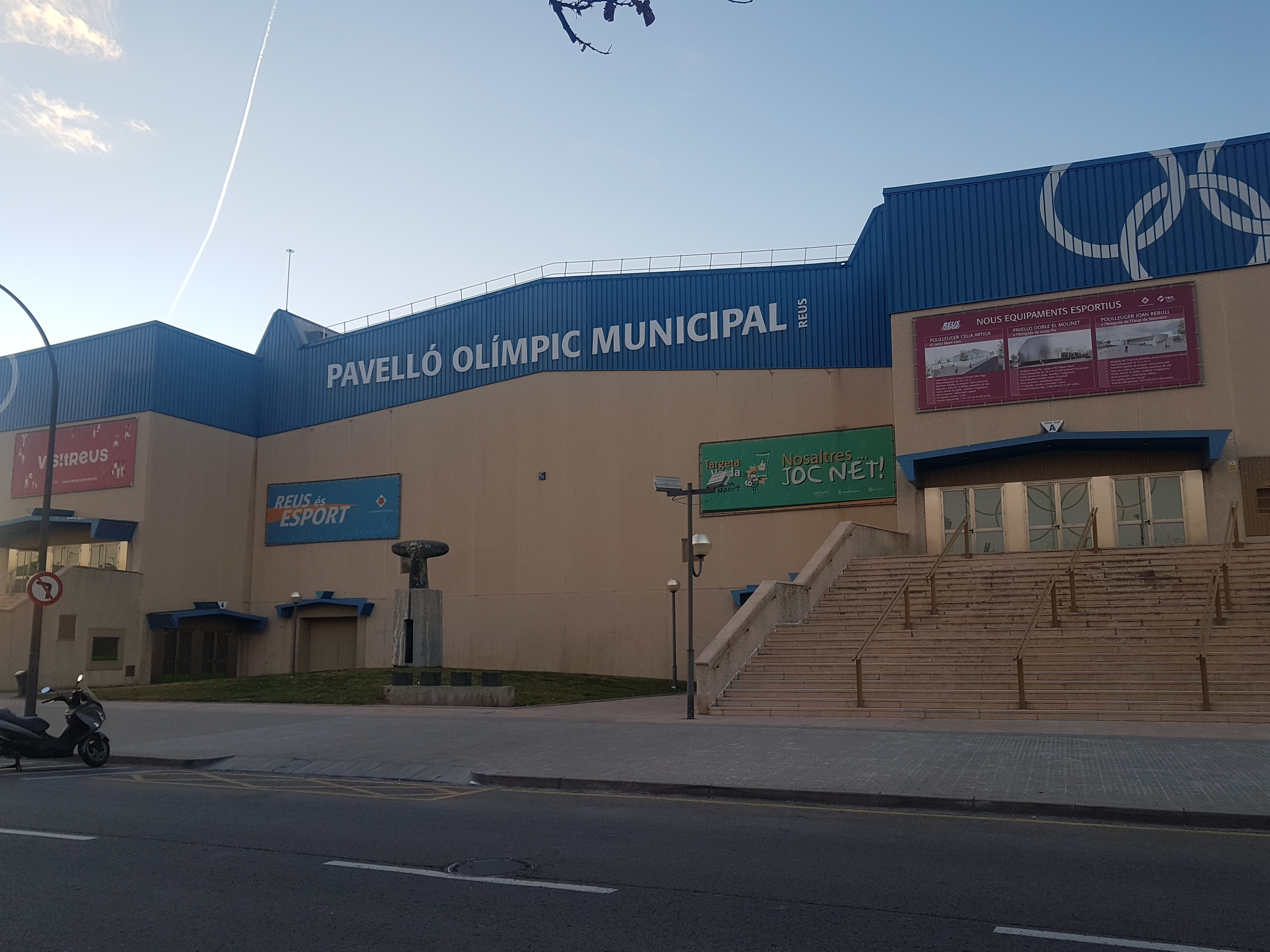
Pavelló Olímpic de Reus Arena

The Pavelló d'Esports de Reus is an indoor arena located in Reus, Catalonia, Spain. Constructed in 1992, this venue was one of the hosts for the demonstration roller hockey competitions at the 1992 Summer Olympics.
