= Ümit Şamiloğlu =

Turkish artistic gymnast (born 1980)

- Born: 29 September 1980 (age 45) Doğubayazıt, Ağrı, Turkey
- Height: 1.73 m (5 ft 8 in)

Gymnastics career
- Discipline: Men's artistic gymnastics
- Country represented: Turkey
- Club: Ankara EGO S.K.
- Head coach: Erdoğan Kapucu
Medal record
Representing Turkey
Men's artistic gymnastics
European Championships
Silver medal – second place	2020 Mersin	Team
Bronze medal – third place	2008 Lausanne	Horizontal bar
World Cup
Gold medal – first place	2020 Baku	Horizontal Bar
Gold medal – first place	2019 Koper	Horizontal Bar
Gold medal – first place	2019 Mersin	Horizontal Bar
Gold medal – first place	2018 Mersin	Horizontal Bar
Gold medal – first place	2016 Ljubljana	Horizontal Bar
Gold medal – first place	2016 Osijek	Horizontal Bar
Gold medal – first place	2016 Mersin	Horizontal Bar
Gold medal – first place	2015 Cottbus	Horizontal Bar
Mediterranean Games
Silver medal – second place	2018 Tarragona	Team
Gold medal – first place	2013 Mersin	Horizontal bar
Silver medal – second place	2001 Tunis	Vault

Ümit Şamiloğlu (born 29 September 1980) is a retired Turkish artistic gymnast. He competed in the horizontal bar event and has won numerous gold medals in international competition. He is said to be the "oldest gymnast" at competitions in which he takes part. He is the creator of a special grip registered by the International Gymnastics Federation into the Code of Points as the "Şamiloğlu" grip.

== Private life ==
Ümit Şamiloğlu was born in Doğubayazıt, Ağrı, eastern Turkey, on 29 September 1980. He has a two years older sister. In 2008, he married Ceren, with whom he has a son, Alkin. His second marriage was to his long-time girlfriend Sevil Topuz; he proposed to her during the medal ceremony at the 2016 Mersin World Challenge Cup. Şamiloğlu worked as a teacher of physical education at a middle School in Bolu before he was appointed to a school in Ankara.

== Early years in gymnastics ==
Şamiloğlu began with artistic gymnastics at a young age, motivated by his schoolteacher father, who himself was untalented but tenacious in physical education lessons during this early school years. The family moved from their hometown of Ağrı to Manisa, where his father was appointed. His father encouraged him to start with gymnastics and introduced him to Hasan Onmuş at Dokuz Eylul University at Manisa. Following a physical examination, Onmuş recommended Ümit to go to Bolu although he was three years older than the age to normally start with gymnastics sport. At that time, Bolu was considered the center of gymnastics in Turkey, as the world's best Soviet trainers had emigrated there following the Dissolution of the Soviet Union.

At age 10, Şamiloğlu moved to Bolu far from his family, and was admitted to a training camp. He was inspired by Turkish gymnast Murat Canbaş. He first trained with Turkish coach Dilaver Abdiloğlu and later with Bulgarian coach Jivko Dobrev, whom he credits with shaping his basic techniques. Şamiloğlu moved to Ankara to study physical education at Gazi University after Dobrev left Bolu to return to his home. A year later, when Dobrev returned to Turkey, Şamiloğlu suspended his university studies and also returned to Bolu.

== Professional career ==
In 2001, Şamiloğlu won his first international medal, a silver, in the vault event at the 2001 Mediterranean Games in Tunis, Tunisia. Upon his return from Tunisia, he realized that his coach had left Turkey again, and followed him to Bulgaria at his own expense to continue training with him. The Turkish Gymnastics Federation later sent him to Romania for a short time for exercise.

Şamiloğlu sustained an ulnar collateral ligament injury of the elbow at the 2007 World Artistic Gymnastics Championships, which was a qualification competition for the 2008 Summer Olympics. After recuperating, he won the bronze medal at the 2008 European Men's Artistic Gymnastics Championships held in Lausanne, Switzerland. Due to an Achilles tendon rupture sustained four days before the 2011 World Artistic Gymnastics Championships - Olympic qualification in Tokyo, Japan, Şamiloğlu lost the chance to participate in the 2012 Summer Olympics.

Şamiloğlu returned to active sport by March 2013 at the age of 33, placing fourth at the Turnier der Meister in Cottbus, Germany., He won his first gold medal at the 2013 Mediterranean Games held in Mersin, Turkey. This also represented Turkey's first gold medal in gymnastics. The Slovenian world and European champion gymnast Aljaž Pegan was appointed head coach of the Turkey national team, and began coaching Şamiloğlu.

Şamiloğlu was a gold medalist at the 2015 FIG Artistic Gymnastics World Cup series in Cottbus, Germany. In 2016, he captured three gold medals at the FIG Artistic Gymnastics World Challenge Cup series in Ljubljana, Slovenia, Osijek, Croatia, and Mersin, Turkey. He was a gold medalist in the horizontal bar event at the 2018 FIG Artistic Gymnastics World Challenge Cup series in Mersin, Turkey. He won the silver medal at the 2018 Mediterranean Games in Tarragona, Spain. In 2019, he won two gold medals at the FIG Artistic Gymnastics World Cup series in Mersin and Koper, Slovenia.

Şamiloğlu transferred from Bolu Gençlik Merkezi S.K. to Ankara EGO S.K. by December 2019. He captains the Turkey national team. In 2020, he took the silver medal in the team event at the European Men's Artistic Gymnastics Championships in Mersin. Şamiloğlu is attributed as the "oldest gymnast" at the competitions in which he participates.

In late 2021 Şamiloğlu announced his retirement from the sport.

== The "Şamiloğlu" grip ==
Together with his coach, Şamiloğlu developed a special grip which could be used by high-level competitors in artistic gymnastics. His aim was to be remembered after he retired from active sport. Şamiloğlu executed this grip for the first time at the 2013 Mediterranean Games in Mersin, Turkey, where he won the gold medal. He used this grip again at subsequent competitions. In 2019, his grip was registered by the International Gymnastics Federation into the Code of Points as the "Şamiloğlu" grip.
