= Loris Frasca =

French artistic gymnast

- Born: 3 July 1995 (age 31) Forbach, France
- Height: 170 cm (5 ft 7 in)

Gymnastics career
- Discipline: Men's artistic gymnastics
- Country represented: France
- Club: OAJLP Antibes
- Retired: 2025
Medal record
Representing France
European Championships
| Bronze medal – third place | 2018 Glasgow | Team |
Mediterranean Games
| Gold medal – first place | 2018 Tarragona | Vault |
| Bronze medal – third place | 2018 Tarragona | Team |
FIG World Cup
| Event | 1st | 2nd | 3rd |
|---|---|---|---|
| Apparatus World Cup | 0 | 1 | 1 |
| World Challenge Cup | 2 | 0 | 0 |
| Total | 2 | 1 | 1 |

Loris Frasca (born 3 July 1995) is a French retired artistic gymnast. He represented France at the 2020 Summer Olympics and at three consecutive World Championships (2017–2019). He is the 2018 Mediterranean Games vault champion. He won bronze medals in the team competitions at the 2018 European Championships and the 2018 Mediterranean Games.

== Gymnastics career ==
Frasca began gymnastics at the age of five. In 2010, he was invited to join the French junior national team, and he moved from Forbach to Antibes. He finished second on the vault at the 2015 and 2016 French Championships.

In 2017, Frasca became the French champion on the vault and also won a bronze medal on the floor exercise. He then made his international debut at the 2017 Paris World Challenge Cup, finishing eighth in the vault final. He competed at the 2017 World Championships but did not advance into any finals.

At the 2018 European Championships, Frasca helped the French team win the bronze medal. Additionally, he qualified for the vault final, where he finished fourth after stepping out of bounds on both vaults. He then won the vault title at the 2018 Mediterranean Games in addition to helping France win team bronze. He won the vault gold medal by only 0.050 points ahead of Andrey Medvedev at the Paris World Challenge Cup. At the 2018 World Championships, he was the third reserve for the all-around final after placing 29th in the qualifications.

Frasca won the all-around title at the 2019 French Championships. He won a silver medal on the vault at the 2019 Melbourne World Cup to Ukraine's Igor Radivilov. At the 2019 European Championships, he finished ninth in the all-around final. He then finished ninth in the all-around at the 2019 European Games, and he finished fifth in the vault final. At the Paris World Challenge Cup, he won the vault title. Although the French team did not qualify for the 2020 Summer Olympics, Frasca qualified through his all-around result at the 2019 World Championships. He was initially the first reserve for the all-around final, but when Kim Han-sol withdrew, he was able to compete and finished 18th.

Frasca placed eighth in the vault final at the 2021 European Championships. He then represented France at the 2020 Summer Olympics, but he did not advance beyond the qualifications.

Frasca did not qualify to compete at the 2024 Summer Olympics, but he was part of the torch relay in Olympia, Greece, after being invited by the city of Antibes. He competed with the French team that placed fifth at the 2025 European Championships. He announced his retirement from the sport after the competition.
