= Thierno Diallo =

Spanish artistic gymnast (born 2000)

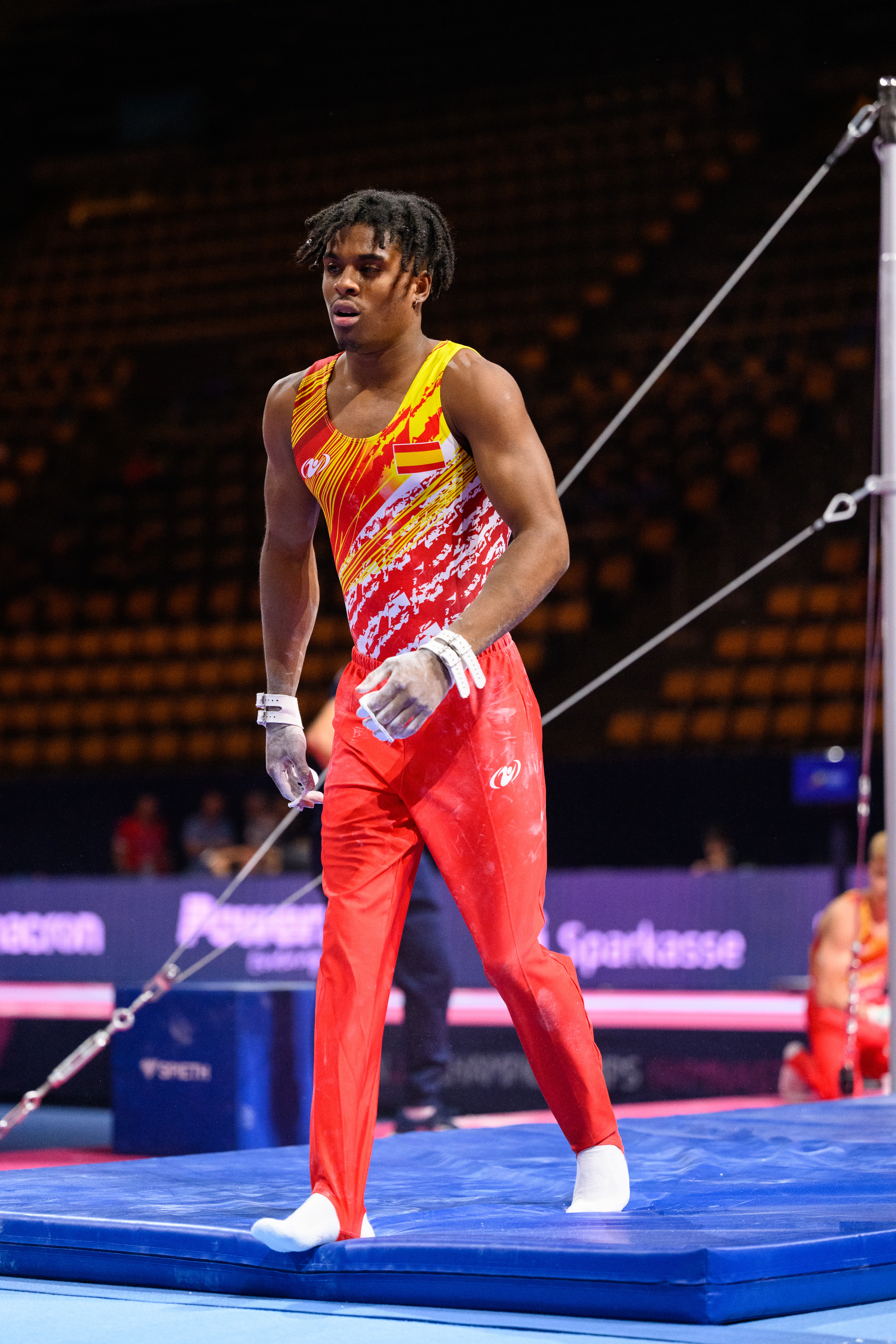

Personal information
- Full name: Thierno Boubacar Diallo Diallo
- Born: 22 November 2000 (age 25) Conakry, Guinea
- Height: 1.64 m (5 ft 5 in)

Gymnastics career
- Discipline: Men's artistic gymnastics
- Country represented: Spain; (2018–present)
- Club: Club Egiba
- Head coach: Fernando Siscar
Medal record
Men's artistic gymnastics
Representing Spain
European Championships
Bronze medal – third place	2023 Antalya	Parallel Bars
Mediterranean Games
Gold medal – first place	2018 Tarragona	Team
Bronze medal – third place	2026 Taranto	Team

Thierno Boubacar Diallo Diallo (born 22 November 2000) is a Guinean-born Spanish artistic gymnast. He represented Spain at the 2020 and 2024 Olympic Games.

== Early life ==
Diallo was born on 22 November 2000 in Conakry, Guinea. When he was six years old he attended a talent scouting program at his school in Manresa and was encouraged to start gymnastics by the coaches who saw his potential.

Diallo was granted Spanish citizenship in 2015. He debuted with the senior national gymnastics team in 2018.

== Gymnastics career ==
Diallo won a team all-around gold medal at the 2018 Mediterranean Games along with Néstor Abad, Nicolau Mir, Alberto Tallón and Rayderley Zapata. The same group finished sixth at the 2018 European Championships. Diallo also competed in the 2018 and 2019 World Championships.

At the Spanish national championships, Diallo placed third in 2018 and second in 2020 in the individual all-around.

At the 2020 Summer Olympics, Diallo competed in the team event.
