= FIG Artistic Gymnastics World Cup series – 2020 Summer Olympics Qualification =

This article describes the qualifying results for 10 nominative spots (6 MAG, 4 WAG) earned through the FIG Artistic Gymnastics World Cup series for the 2020 Summer Olympics. It further describes the results for six non-nominative spots (3 MAG, 3WAG) earned through the FIG Artistic Gymnastics World Cup All-Around series by nations who have qualified a for the team events at those Games.

== Rules ==
Gymnasts attempting to earn a nominative spot at the 2020 Summer Olympics earn points at the various Artistic Gymnastics World Cups and their top three placements count towards their total. Whoever earns the highest total points at the end of the eight World Cups earns a guaranteed spot at the Olympics. Only one athlete per NOC can earn a spot and the athlete can not have helped their NOC qualify a team spot through the 2018 or 2019 World Artistic Gymnastics Championships.

Gymnasts attempting to earn their nation a non-nominative spot at the 2020 Summer Olympics earn points at the 4 Artistic Gymnastics World Cup All-Around series events. Points earned count towards a national total. The three nations earning the highest total points at the end of the four All-Around World Cups in men's and women's competition earn a fifth individual spot at the Olympics.

Below is the table showing how many points a gymnast earns at each competition, depending on their placement.

Nominative places

| Rank | # of Points Earned |
|---|---|
| 1 | 30 |
| 2 | 25 |
| 3 | 20 |
| 4 | 18 |
| 5 | 16 |
| 6 | 14 |
| 7 | 12 |
| 8 | 10 |
| 9 | 8 |
| 10 | 7 |
| 11 | 6 |
| 12 | 5 |

Non-nominative places

| Rank | # of Points Earned |
|---|---|
| 1 | 60 |
| 2 | 55 |
| 3 | 50 |
| 4 | 45 |
| 5 | 40 |
| 6 | 35 |
| 7 | 30 |
| 8 | 25 |
| 9 | 20 |
| 10 | 15 |
| 11 | 10 |
| 12 | 5 |

== All-Around World Cup series results ==
As stated in the Olympic Qualification guidelines, a minimum of 3 and maximum of 4 All-Around World Cups must take place for the All-Around World Cup series to remain a valid path for qualification of an additional spot. However, due to the fact that the Stuttgart, Birmingham, and Tokyo World Cups were canceled, the backup qualification allocation was to be executed:

Should the 2020 Individual All-Around World Cup Series not be held, the unused quota places will be reallocated to the next highest ranked eligible NOC based on the Team ranking results of Qualifications of the 2019 World Championships.

However, in April 2020 the FIG announced that because the IOC has extended the qualification period until 29 June 2021, they will work with the organizing national federations to reschedule the canceled World Cups and proposed an amendment whereby the three best results out of four All-Around World Cups will be taken into consideration for Olympic qualification.

In February 2021, after both Stuttgart and Birmingham had once again canceled their respective World Cups, the FIG stated that because less than three World Cups took place, the unused places go to the highest-ranked countries in the team ranking results of the qualifications at the 2019 World Championships. For men's artistic gymnastics this was Russia, China, and Japan. For women's artistic gymnastics this was the US, China, and Russia. In March the Tokyo World Cup was once again canceled as well.

Men's All-Around World Cup

| Nation | Milwaukee (United States) | Stuttgart (Germany) | Birmingham (United Kingdom) | Tokyo (Japan) | Total |
|---|---|---|---|---|---|
| United States | 60 | (Note: Canceled due to the COVID-19 pandemic in Germany) | (Note: Canceled due to the COVID-19 pandemic in the United Kingdom) | (Note: Canceled due to the COVID-19 pandemic in Japan) | 60 |
| Ukraine | 55 | (Note: Canceled due to the COVID-19 pandemic in Germany) | (Note: Canceled due to the COVID-19 pandemic in the United Kingdom) | (Note: Canceled due to the COVID-19 pandemic in Japan) | 55 |
| Great Britain | 50 | (Note: Canceled due to the COVID-19 pandemic in Germany) | (Note: Canceled due to the COVID-19 pandemic in the United Kingdom) | (Note: Canceled due to the COVID-19 pandemic in Japan) | 50 |
| Japan | 45 | (Note: Canceled due to the COVID-19 pandemic in Germany) | (Note: Canceled due to the COVID-19 pandemic in the United Kingdom) | (Note: Canceled due to the COVID-19 pandemic in Japan) | 45 |
| Switzerland | 40 | (Note: Canceled due to the COVID-19 pandemic in Germany) | (Note: Canceled due to the COVID-19 pandemic in the United Kingdom) | (Note: Canceled due to the COVID-19 pandemic in Japan) | 40 |
| Brazil | 35 | (Note: Canceled due to the COVID-19 pandemic in Germany) | (Note: Canceled due to the COVID-19 pandemic in the United Kingdom) | (Note: Canceled due to the COVID-19 pandemic in Japan) | 35 |
| Chinese Taipei | 30 | (Note: Canceled due to the COVID-19 pandemic in Germany) | (Note: Canceled due to the COVID-19 pandemic in the United Kingdom) | (Note: Canceled due to the COVID-19 pandemic in Japan) | 30 |
| Spain | 25 | (Note: Canceled due to the COVID-19 pandemic in Germany) | (Note: Canceled due to the COVID-19 pandemic in the United Kingdom) | (Note: Canceled due to the COVID-19 pandemic in Japan) | 25 |
| Canada | 20 | (Note: Canceled due to the COVID-19 pandemic in Germany) | (Note: Canceled due to the COVID-19 pandemic in the United Kingdom) | (Note: Canceled due to the COVID-19 pandemic in Japan) | 20 |
| China | 15 | (Note: Canceled due to the COVID-19 pandemic in Germany) | (Note: Canceled due to the COVID-19 pandemic in the United Kingdom) | (Note: Canceled due to the COVID-19 pandemic in Japan) | 15 |
| Germany | 10 | (Note: Canceled due to the COVID-19 pandemic in Germany) | (Note: Canceled due to the COVID-19 pandemic in the United Kingdom) | (Note: Canceled due to the COVID-19 pandemic in Japan) | 10 |
| ROC | DNP (Note: Withdrew due to the COVID-19 pandemic in the United States) | (Note: Canceled due to the COVID-19 pandemic in Germany) | (Note: Canceled due to the COVID-19 pandemic in the United Kingdom) | (Note: Canceled due to the COVID-19 pandemic in Japan) | 0 |

Women's All-Around World Cup

| Nation | Milwaukee (United States) | Stuttgart (Germany) | Birmingham (United Kingdom) | Tokyo (Japan) | Total |
|---|---|---|---|---|---|
| United States | 60 | | | | 60 |
| Japan | 55 | | | | 55 |
| Great Britain | 50 | | | | 50 |
| Canada | 45 | | | | 45 |
| Australia | 40 | | | | 40 |
| Italy | 35 | | | | 35 |
| France | 30 | | | | 30 |
| China | 25 | | | | 25 |
| Ukraine | 20 | | | | 20 |
| Germany | 15 | | | | 15 |
| Spain | 10 | | | | 10 |
| ROC | DNP | | | | 0 |

== Apparatus World Cup series results ==
Only the top ten athletes per apparatus are listed below. The top 3 scores per athlete are bolded and the total column is the sum of the top 3 scores.

Even though the 2020 Baku World Cup was canceled due to the coronavirus pandemic, qualifications were completed before the event was canceled and the FIG ruled that the qualifying results would be used for Olympic qualification point distribution.

=== Women ===
==== Vault ====
| Rank | Athlete | Cottbus 2018 | Melbourne 2019 | Baku 2019 | Doha 2019 | Cottbus 2019 | Melbourne 2020 | Baku 2020 | Doha 2021 | Total |
|---|---|---|---|---|---|---|---|---|---|---|
| 1 | Jade Carey (USA) | 25 | – | **30** | **30** | – | **30** | – | – | 90 |
| 2 | Coline Devillard (FRA) | – | – | **25** | 20 | – | **25** | 25 | **30** | 80 |
| 3 | Teja Belak (SLO) | **16** | – | 7 | 8 | **25** | 12 | **30** | – | 71 |
| 4 | Yu Linmin (CHN) | – | **30** | – | – | **30** | – | – | – | 60 |
| 5 | Maria Paseka (RUS) | – | – | **20** | **25** | **14** | 10 | 6 | – | 59 |
| 6 | Tjaša Kysselef (SLO) | 12 | **20** | **18** | 14 | – | **16** | 16 | – | 54 |
| 7 | Nancy Taman (EGY) | – | – | **14** | – | **8** | – | – | **25** | 47 |
| 8 | Ayaka Sakaguchi (JPN) | – | **25** | – | – | **18** | – | – | – | 43 |
| 9 | Paula Mejias (PUR) | – | **18** | – | **16** | **6** | – | – | – | 40 |
| 10 | Dipa Karmakar (IND) | **20** | – | **16** | – | – | – | – | – | 36 |
| ref | | | | | | | | | | |

==== Uneven bars ====
| Rank | Athlete | Cottbus 2018 | Melbourne 2019 | Baku 2019 | Doha 2019 | Cottbus 2019 | Melbourne 2020 | Baku 2020 | Doha 2021 | Total |
|---|---|---|---|---|---|---|---|---|---|---|
| 1 | Fan Yilin (CHN) | 16 | **30** | – | **30** | **30** | – | 30 | – | 90 |
| 2 | Lyu Jiaqi (CHN) | **25** | **25** | **30** | – | – | – | – | – | 80 |
| 3 | Rebeca Andrade (BRA) | **30** | – | – | – | – | – | **20** | **30** | 80 |
| 4 | Anastasia Ilyankova (RUS) | – | – | **25** | **25** | 18 | 18 | **25** | – | 75 |
| 5 | Daria Spiridonova (RUS) | **20** | – | – | – | – | **30** | **18** | – | 68 |
| 6 | Georgia-Rose Brown (AUS) | – | **20** | **20** | – | 10 | **25** | 16 | – | 65 |
| 7 | Anastasia Bachynska (UKR) | – | – | **16** | – | – | **16** | 14 | **25** | 57 |
| 8 | Martina Rizzelli (ITA) | 12 | **14** | **18** | **20** | – | – | – | – | 52 |
| 9 | Lorrane Oliveira (BRA) | **10** | – | – | – | – | – | – | **20** | 30 |
| 10 | Aoka Mori (JPN) | – | – | – | – | **8** | **20** | – | – | 28 |
| ref | | | | | | | | | | |

==== Balance beam ====
| Rank | Athlete | Cottbus 2018 | Melbourne 2019 | Baku 2019 | Doha 2019 | Cottbus 2019 | Melbourne 2020 | Baku 2020 | Doha 2021 | Total |
|---|---|---|---|---|---|---|---|---|---|---|
| 1 | Urara Ashikawa (JPN) | – | – | – | – | **30** | **30** | **30** | – | 90 |
| 2 | Rebeca Andrade (BRA) | **30** | – | – | – | – | – | **25** | **30** | 85 |
| 3 | Emma Nedov (AUS) | – | **25** | **30** | – | **20** | 18 | 18 | – | 75 |
| 4 | Li Qi (CHN) | – | – | **18** | **30** | **20** | – | – | – | 68 |
| 5 | Anastasia Bachynska (UKR) | – | – | **20** | – | 18 | **20** | **20** | 12 | 60 |
| 6 | Mana Oguchi (JPN) | – | **20** | **25** | – | – | – | – | – | 45 |
| 7 | Lara Mori (ITA) | **12** | – | **16** | – | – | **12** | 8 | – | 40 |
| 8 | Coline Devillard (FRA) | – | – | **12** | **8** | – | – | – | **20** | 40 |
| 9 | Ondine Achampong (GBR) | – | – | – | – | – | **25** | **14** | – | 39 |
| 10 | Lai Pin-Ju (TPE) | **10** | **16** | 6 | **10** | – | 6 | – | – | 36 |
| ref | | | | | | | | | | |

==== Floor exercise ====
| Rank | Athlete | Cottbus 2018 | Melbourne 2019 | Baku 2019 | Doha 2019 | Cottbus 2019 | Melbourne 2020 | Baku 2020 | Doha 2021 | Total |
|---|---|---|---|---|---|---|---|---|---|---|
| 1 | Jade Carey (USA) (Note: Carey qualified via Vault; therefore the Floor Exercise berth went to Ferrari) | 18 | – | **30** | **30** | – | **30** | – | – | 90 |
| 2 | Vanessa Ferrari (ITA) (Note: Ferrari was named to the Italian four-person team after Giorgia Villa was injured; therefore the berth went to Mori) | – | **30** | 20 | 20 | – | **25** | 25 | **30** | 85 |
| 3 | Lara Mori (ITA) | 20 | – | **25** | 25 | 25 | 20 | **30** | **25** | 80 |
| 4 | Anastasia Bachynska (UKR) | – | – | **14** | – | **30** | 6 | 5 | **18** | 62 |
| 5 | Marta Pihan-Kulesza (POL) | **25** | – | – | **18** | **18** | – | 6 | – | 61 |
| 6 | Angelina Radivilova (UKR) | **7** | – | – | – | **14** | – | **18** | – | 39 |
| 7 | Varvara Zubova (RUS) | – | – | **18** | **16** | – | – | – | – | 34 |
| 8 | Emma Nedov (AUS) | – | **18** | **16** | – | – | – | – | – | 34 |
| 9 | Paula Mejias (PUR) | – | **25** | – | **8** | – | – | – | – | 33 |
| 10 | Ondine Achampong (GBR) | – | – | – | – | – | **18** | **14** | – | 32 |
| ref | | | | | | | | | | |

=== Men ===
==== Floor exercise ====
| Rank | Athlete | Cottbus 2018 | Melbourne 2019 | Baku 2019 | Doha 2019 | Cottbus 2019 | Melbourne 2020 | Baku 2020 | Doha 2021 | Total |
|---|---|---|---|---|---|---|---|---|---|---|
| 1 | Rayderley Zapata (ESP) | – | 25 | **30** | **30** | 25 | 18 | – | **30** | **90** |
| 2 | Emil Soravuo (FIN) | **18** | – | **25** | **25** | – | – | – | – | **68** |
| 3 | Kirill Prokopev (RUS) | – | – | – | – | **14** | **25** | **25** | – | **64** |
| 4 | Casimir Schmidt (NED) | **30** | **20** | – | – | – | – | **8** | – | **57** |
| 5 | Chris Remkes (AUS) | – | **18** | **18** | **18** | – | – | – | – | **54** |
| 6 | Ryu Sung-hyun (KOR) | 14 | 16 | – | – | – | 30 | 20 | – | 50 |
| 7 | Hayden Skinner (GBR) | – | – | – | – | **25** | **10** | **14** | – | **49** |
| 8 | Kazuki Minami (JPN) | – | – | – | – | 30 | – | 18 | – | 48 |
| 9 | Rok Klavora (SLO) | **16** | 7 | **14** | – | **8** | – | 7 | – | **38** |
| 10 | Jorge Vega Lopez (GUA) | – | – | – | **16** | **6** | **14** | – | – | **36** |
| ref | | | | | | | | | | |

==== Pommel horse ====
| Rank | Athlete | Cottbus 2018 | Melbourne 2019 | Baku 2019 | Doha 2019 | Cottbus 2019 | Melbourne 2020 | Baku 2020 | Doha 2021 | Total |
|---|---|---|---|---|---|---|---|---|---|---|
| 1 | Weng Hao (CHN) (Note: Chinese athlete You Hao won Parallel Bars and beat Weng in the tie-break, earning the Olympic Berth. A NOC could earn a max of 1 spot via this qualification; therefore Kameyama earned the Pommel Horse berth.) | **30** | **30** | 25 | 0 | **30** | – | 30 | – | 90 |
| 2 | Kohei Kameyama (JPN) | – | – | **30** | **30** | – | **20** | – | 20 | 80 |
| 3 | Saeid Reza Keikha (IRI) | **25** | – | 18 | 20 | – | **25** | 20 | **30** | 80 |
| 4 | Kaito Imabayahi (JPN) | – | – | **14** | **25** | **25** | – | – | – | 64 |
| 5 | Nariman Kurbanov (KAZ) | – | 12 | **20** | – | – | 5 | **16** | **25** | 61 |
| 6 | Stephen Nedoroscik (USA) | – | – | – | **16** | **12** | **30** | – | – | 58 |
| 7 | Harutyun Merdinyan (ARM) | **20** | – | – | **18** | **20** | – | – | – | 58 |
| 8 | Thierry Pellerin (CAN) | – | **20** | – | 10 | **18** | **18** | 14 | – | 56 |
| 9 | Robert Seligman (CRO) | **16** | – | – | **12** | **16** | 10 | – | – | 44 |
| 10 | Filip Ude (CRO) | **12** | – | **16** | **14** | – | – | 10 | – | 42 |
| ref | | | | | | | | | | |

==== Still rings ====
| Rank | Athlete | Cottbus 2018 | Melbourne 2019 | Baku 2019 | Doha 2019 | Cottbus 2019 | Melbourne 2020 | Baku 2020 | Doha 2021 | Total |
|---|---|---|---|---|---|---|---|---|---|---|
| 1 | Eleftherios Petrounias (GRE) | – | – | – | – | 25 | **30** | **30** | **30** | **90** |
| 2 | Liu Yang (CHN) | **30** | **30** | – | – | **30** | – | 25 | – | **90** |
| 3 | You Hao (CHN) | **25** | **25** | **18** | – | 18 | – | – | – | **68** |
| 4 | Courtney Tulloch (GBR) | **18** | **18** | **30** | 16 | 14 | 16 | 16 | – | **66** |
| 5 | Mehdi Ahmadkohani (IRI) | – | – | **10** | – | – | **25** | 5 | **25** | **60** |
| 6 | Ali Zahran (EGY) | 16 | 16 | 16 | **18** | – | **20** | 16 | **20** | **58** |
| 7 | Lan Xingyu (CHN) | – | – | – | 30 | – | – | 20 | – | 50 |
| 8 | Vahagn Davtyan (ARM) | 14 | – | – | 20 | 16 | – | – | – | 50 |
| 9 | Nikita Simonov (AZE) | **12** | – | **25** | **10** | – | – | – | – | **47** |
| 10 | Artur Tovmasyan (ARM) | 20 | – | – | 25 | – | – | – | – | 45 |
| ref | | | | | | | | | | |

==== Vault ====
| Rank | Athlete | Cottbus 2018 | Melbourne 2019 | Baku 2019 | Doha 2019 | Cottbus 2019 | Melbourne 2020 | Baku 2020 | Doha 2021 | Total |
|---|---|---|---|---|---|---|---|---|---|---|
| 1 | Shin Jea-hwan (KOR) | – | **25** | 16 | – | 16 | **30** | **30** | 18 | **85** |
| 2 | Hidenobu Yonekura (JPN) | **25** | **30** | – | – | 20 | 10 | 7 | **30** | **85** |
| 3 | Jorge Vega (GUA) | **20** | – | 10 | **30** | 14 | **25** | 10 | 7 | **75** |
| 4 | Andrey Medvedev (ISR) | – | 18 | 12 | 18 | – | **20** | **25** | **25** | **70** |
| 5 | Yahor Sharamkou (BLR) | 12 | – | **18** | 14 | **25** | 16 | **18** | 8 | **61** |
| 6 | Tseng Wei-Sheng (TPE) | **16** | 7 | – | **25** | **18** | 7 | – | – | **59** |
| 7 | Audrys Nin Reyes (DOM) | – | – | – | – | **30** | **12** | **6** | – | **48** |
| 8 | James Bacueti (AUS) | – | 8 | – | **10** | – | **18** | **20** | – | **48** |
| 9 | Denis Ablyazin (RUS) | – | – | 30 | 12 | – | – | – | – | 42 |
| 10 | Christopher Remkes (AUS) | – | 20 | 20 | – | – | – | – | – | 40 |
| ref | | | | | | | | | | |

==== Parallel bars ====
| Rank | Athlete | Cottbus 2018 | Melbourne 2019 | Baku 2019 | Doha 2019 | Cottbus 2019 | Melbourne 2020 | Baku 2020 | Doha 2021 | Total |
|---|---|---|---|---|---|---|---|---|---|---|
| 1 | You Hao (CHN) | 20 | **30** | 25 | – | **30** | – | **30** | – | **90** |
| 2 | Vladislav Poliashov (RUS) | – | – | **30** | **30** | 25 | **30** | 25 | – | **90** |
| 3 | Mitchell Morgans (AUS) | 16 | **25** | 8 | **25** | – | **18** | – | – | **68** |
| 4 | Đinh Phương Thành (VIE) | –' | – | **20** | **18** | – | **25** | 18 | – | **63** |
| 5 | Mikhail Koudinov (NZL) | – | **18** | – | – | – | **12** | **16** | – | **46** |
| 6 | Julien Gobaux (FRA) | 25 | – | – | 10 | – | – | – | – | 35 |
| 7 | Matteo Levantesi (ITA) | – | – | 18 | 16 | – | – | – | – | 34 |
| 8 | Marcel Nguyen (GER) | 30 | – | – | – | – | – | – | – | 30 |
| 9 | Omar Mohamed (EGY) | – | – | – | – | – | – | – | 30 | 30 |
| 10 | Frank Rijken (NED) | – | – | – | | – | 16 | 12 | – | 28 |
| ref | | | | | | | | | | |

==== High bar ====
| Rank | Athlete | Cottbus 2018 | Melbourne 2019 | Baku 2019 | Doha 2019 | Cottbus 2019 | Melbourne 2020 | Baku 2020 | Doha 2021 | Total |
|---|---|---|---|---|---|---|---|---|---|---|
| 1 | Epke Zonderland (NED) | **30** | 25 | **30** | 16 | – | **30** | 25 | – | **90** |
| 2 | Hidetaka Miyachi (JPN) | 25 | **30** | 20 | **30** | **30** | 18 | – | – | **90** |
| 3 | Mitchell Morgans (AUS) | – | **18** | **25** | – | – | **25** | – | – | **68** |
| 4 | Alexey Rostov (RUS) | – | – | 7 | **18** | **20** | – | **25** | – | **63** |
| 5 | Carlo Macchini (ITA) | **18** | – | **16** | **20** | – | – | – | – | **54** |
| 6 | Zhang Chenglong (CHN) | – | **20** | **18** | 12 | **14** | – | – | – | **52** |
| 7 | Ümit Şamiloğlu (TUR) | – | – | – | – | – | 20 | 30 | – | 50 |
| 8 | Dávid Vecsernyés (HUN) | **20** | 6 | **12** | **10** | 7 | – | – | – | **42** |
| 9 | Randy Lerú (CUB) | – | – | – | 25 | 12 | – | – | – | 37 |
| 10 | Mikhail Koudinov (NZL) | – | **8** | – | – | – | **14** | **12** | – | **34** |
| ref | | | | | | | | | | |
