= Gymnastics at the 2020 Summer Olympics – Qualification =

This article describes the qualifying phase for gymnastics at the 2020 Summer Olympics (postponed to 2021 due to the COVID-19 pandemic).

The qualification system underwent a significant revision following the 2016 Summer Olympics in Rio. The team events in artistic gymnastics will be reduced from five members to four, but a maximum of two further places will be available for competitors in individual events, in principle allowing one or two athletes per National Olympic Committee (NOC) to enter as specialists.

In a further move to link International Gymnastics Federation (FIG) competitions to the Olympics, it will now be possible to qualify for the Olympics on the basis of an aggregate of scores achieved over the Artistic Gymnastics World Cup series and the various continental artistic gymnastics championships.

== Timeline ==
Artistic Gymnastics
Event	Date	Venue
2018 World Artistic Gymnastics Championships	October 25 – November 3, 2018	(Qatar) Doha
2019 World Artistic Gymnastics Championships	October 4–13, 2019	(Germany) Stuttgart
Artistic Gymnastics World Cup: 2018 World Cup series; 2019 World Cup series; 2020 World Cup series; 2021 World Cup series	Throughout 2018, 2019, 2020 and 2021	Various
2021 Continental Championships: 2021 European Championships; ~~2021 Asian Championships~~; 2021 Pan American Championships; 2021 African Championships; 2021 Oceania Championships	April–June 2021	(Switzerland) Basel; N/A (Brazil) Rio de Janeiro (Egypt) Cairo (Australia) Gold Coast
Rhythmic Gymnastics
Event	Date	Venue
2018 Rhythmic Gymnastics World Championships	September 10–16, 2018	(Bulgaria) Sofia
2019 Rhythmic Gymnastics World Championships	September 16–22, 2019	(Azerbaijan) Baku
2021 Rhythmic Gymnastics World Cup Series	2021	Various
2020–21 Continental Championships	2020 and 2021	Various
Trampoline
Event	Date	Venue
2019 Trampoline World Championships	November 28 – December 1, 2019	(Japan) Tokyo
2019–21 Trampoline World Cup series	February 2019 to 2021 (6 competitions)	Various
2021 Continental Championships	2021	Various

== Qualification summary ==
The table below lists the numbers of men and women from each NOC who have qualified for the gymnastics events at the 2020 Olympics.

Nation	Artistic		Rhythmic		Trampoline		Total
Nation	Men	Women	Individual	Group	Men	Women	Total
Albania	1						1
Argentina		1					1
Armenia	1						1
Australia	1	2	1	Yes	1	1	11
Austria		1					1
Azerbaijan	1	1	1	Yes			8
Belarus	~~1~~	1	2	Yes	2		10
Belgium		4					4
Brazil	5	2		Yes			12
Bulgaria	1		2	Yes			8
Canada	1	4				2	7
Cape Verde			1				1
Cayman Islands		1					1
Chile	1	1					2
China	6	6		Yes	2	2	21
Colombia					1		1
Costa Rica		1					1
Croatia	1	1					2
Cuba	~~1~~	1					1
Cyprus	1						1
Czech Republic	1	1					2
Egypt	1	2	1	Yes	1	1	11
France	3	4			1	1	9
Georgia			1				1
Germany	4	4					8
Great Britain	4	4				2	10
Greece	1						1
Hong Kong	1						1
Hungary		1	1				2
India		1					1
Ireland	1	1					2
Israel	2	1	2	Yes			10
Italy	2	5	2	Yes			14
Jamaica		1					1
Japan	6	5	2	Yes	2	2	22
Kazakhstan	1		1				2
Lithuania	1						1
Malaysia	1	1					2
Mexico	1	1	1			1	4
Netherlands	2	4					6
New Zealand	1				1	1	3
Nigeria	1						1
~~North Korea~~		~~1~~					~~1~~
Norway	1	1					2
Peru		1					1
Philippines	1						1
Poland		1					1
Portugal		1			1		2
Romania	1	2					3
ROC	6	6	2	Yes	2	2	23
Singapore		1					1
Slovakia		1					1
Slovenia			1				1
South Africa		2					2
South Korea	5	2					7
Spain	5	4					9
Sri Lanka		1					1
Sweden	1	1					2
Switzerland	4	1					5
Chinese Taipei	4	1					5
Turkey	4	1					5
Ukraine	4	1	2	Yes	1		13
United States	5	6	2	Yes	1	1	20
Uzbekistan	1	1	1	Yes			8
Vietnam	2						2
Total: 64 NOCs	98	98	26	70	16	16	324

== Artistic ==
=== Men's events ===
Team places

Event	Standard	Qualified national team
Teams of four
2018 World Artistic Gymnastics Championships	Team places 1–3	China; ROC; Japan
2019 World Artistic Gymnastics Championships	Team places 1–9 (among non-qualified teams)	Ukraine; Great Britain; Switzerland; United States; Chinese Taipei; South Korea; Brazil; Spain; Germany
Total		48 (12 teams of 4)

Individual quotas

Event	Standard	Qualified gymnast
2019 World Artistic Gymnastics Championships (1 quota per NOC)	All-around	Carlos Yulo (PHI); ~~Manrique Larduet (CUB)~~; Ludovico Edalli (ITA); Milad Karimi (KAZ); Loris Frasca (FRA); Robert Tvorogal (LTU); Alexander Shatilov (ISR); Ferhat Arıcan (TUR); Artur Davtyan (ARM); David Huddleston (BUL); Bart Deurloo (NED); Daniel Corral (MEX)
2019 World Artistic Gymnastics Championships (max. 3 quotas per NOC across all apparatus)	Floor	Artem Dolgopyat (ISR)
2019 World Artistic Gymnastics Championships (max. 3 quotas per NOC across all apparatus)	Pommel horse	Rhys McClenaghan (IRL); Cyril Tommasone (FRA)
2019 World Artistic Gymnastics Championships (max. 3 quotas per NOC across all apparatus)	Rings	İbrahim Çolak (TUR); Marco Lodadio (ITA); Samir Aït Saïd (FRA)
2019 World Artistic Gymnastics Championships (max. 3 quotas per NOC across all apparatus)	Vault	Shek Wai Hung (HKG); Lê Thanh Tùng (VIE); Marian Drăgulescu (ROU)
2019 World Artistic Gymnastics Championships (max. 3 quotas per NOC across all apparatus)	Parallel bars	Ahmet Önder (TUR)
2019 World Artistic Gymnastics Championships (max. 3 quotas per NOC across all apparatus)	Horizontal bar	Tin Srbić (CRO); Tyson Bull (AUS)
FIG Artistic Gymnastics World Cup series 2018–2020 (1 quota per NOC across all apparatus)	Floor	Rayderley Zapata (ESP)
FIG Artistic Gymnastics World Cup series 2018–2020 (1 quota per NOC across all apparatus)	Pommel horse	Kohei Kameyama (JPN)
FIG Artistic Gymnastics World Cup series 2018–2020 (1 quota per NOC across all apparatus)	Rings	Eleftherios Petrounias (GRE)
FIG Artistic Gymnastics World Cup series 2018–2020 (1 quota per NOC across all apparatus)	Vault	Shin Jae-hwan (KOR)
FIG Artistic Gymnastics World Cup series 2018–2020 (1 quota per NOC across all apparatus)	Parallel bars	You Hao (CHN)
FIG Artistic Gymnastics World Cup series 2018–2020 (1 quota per NOC across all apparatus)	Horizontal bar	Epke Zonderland (NED)
2020 Individual All-Around World Cup series (1 quota per NOC)	All-around	ROC; China; Japan
2020 Continental Championships (1 quota per NOC; all-around qualification)	Africa	Omar Mohamed (EGY); Uche Eke (NGR)
2020 Continental Championships (1 quota per NOC; all-around qualification)	Asia	Đinh Phương Thành (VIE); Loo Phay Xing (MAS)
2020 Continental Championships (1 quota per NOC; all-around qualification)	Americas	United States; Brazil
2020 Continental Championships (1 quota per NOC; all-around qualification)	Europe	ROC; Adem Asil (TUR)
2020 Continental Championships (1 quota per NOC; all-around qualification)	Oceania	Mikhail Koudinov (NZL)
Reserved places	Host nation	Host nation qualified above
Reserved places	Tripartite invitation	Matvei Petrov (ALB)
2019 World Artistic Gymnastics Championships (Reallocation)	All-around	René Cournoyer (CAN); Rasuljon Abdurakhimov (UZB); Marios Georgiou (CYP); İvan Tixonov (AZE); David Rumbutis (SWE); ~~Andrey Likhavitski (BLR)~~; Sofus Heggemsnes (NOR); David Jessen (CZE); Tomás González (CHI)
Total		50

=== Women's events ===
Team places

Event	Standard	Qualified national team
Teams of four
2018 World Artistic Gymnastics Championships	Team places 1–3	United States; ROC; China
2019 World Artistic Gymnastics Championships	Team places 1–9 (among non-qualified teams)	France; Canada; Netherlands; Great Britain; Italy; Germany; Belgium; Japan; Spain
Total		48 (12 teams of 4)

Individual quotas

Event	Standard	Qualified gymnast
2019 World Artistic Gymnastics Championships (1 quota per NOC)	All-around	Flávia Saraiva (BRA); Giulia Steingruber (SUI); Georgia Godwin (AUS); Diana Varinska (UKR); Lee Yun-seo (KOR); Zsófia Kovács (HUN); ~~Martina Dominici (ARG) (Note: On 23 June 2021, it was reported that Dominici had tested positive for a banned substance and was excluded from the Olympics.)~~; Abigail Magistrati (ARG); Alexa Moreno (MEX); Danusia Francis (JAM); ~~Kim Su-jong (PRK)~~; Aneta Holasová (CZE); Marcia Vidiaux (CUB); Maria Holbură (ROU); Elisa Hämmerle (AUT); ~~Anastasiya Alistratava (BLR)~~; Farah Ann Abdul Hadi (MAS); Mandy Mohamed (EGY); Nazlı Savranbaşı (TUR); Barbora Mokošová (SVK); Ana Filipa Martins (POR)
2019 World Artistic Gymnastics Championships (max. 3 quotas per NOC across all apparatus)	Vault	Yeo Seo-jeong (KOR)
2019 World Artistic Gymnastics Championships (max. 3 quotas per NOC across all apparatus)	Uneven Bars	—
2019 World Artistic Gymnastics Championships (max. 3 quotas per NOC across all apparatus)	Balance beam	—
2019 World Artistic Gymnastics Championships (max. 3 quotas per NOC across all apparatus)	Floor	—
FIG Artistic Gymnastics World Cup series 2018–2020 (1 quota per NOC across all apparatus)	Vault	Jade Carey (USA)
FIG Artistic Gymnastics World Cup series 2018–2020 (1 quota per NOC across all apparatus)	Uneven bars	Fan Yilin (CHN)
FIG Artistic Gymnastics World Cup series 2018–2020 (1 quota per NOC across all apparatus)	Balance beam	Urara Ashikawa (JPN)
FIG Artistic Gymnastics World Cup series 2018–2020 (1 quota per NOC across all apparatus)	Floor	~~Vanessa Ferrari (ITA)~~; Lara Mori (ITA)
2020 Individual All-Around World Cup series (1 quota per NOC)	All-around	United States; China; ROC
2020 Continental Championships (1 quota per NOC; all-around qualification)	Africa	Zeina Ibrahim (EGY); Naveen Daries (RSA)
2020 Continental Championships (1 quota per NOC; all-around qualification)	Asia	Milka Gehani (SRI); Pranati Nayak (IND)
2020 Continental Championships (1 quota per NOC; all-around qualification)	Americas	Rebeca Andrade (BRA); Luciana Alvarado (CRC)
2020 Continental Championships (1 quota per NOC; all-around qualification)	Europe	ROC; Larisa Iordache (ROU)
2020 Continental Championships (1 quota per NOC; all-around qualification)	Oceania	Emily Whitehead (AUS)
Reserved places	Host nation	Host nation qualified above
Reserved places	Tripartite invitation	Raegan Rutty (CAY)
2019 World Artistic Gymnastics Championships (Reallocation)	All-around	Ana Đerek (CRO); Caitlin Rooskrantz (RSA); Jonna Adlerteg (SWE); Gabriela Janik (POL); Simona Castro (CHI); Lihie Raz (ISR); Julie Erichsen (NOR); Ariana Orrego (PER); Oksana Chusovitina (UZB); Ting Hua-tien (TPE); Marina Nekrasova (AZE); Tan Sze En (SGP); Megan Ryan (IRL); Hanna Traukova (BLR)
Total		50

== Rhythmic ==
=== Individual all-around ===
Event	Standard	Qualified NOC
2019 Rhythmic Gymnastics World Championships; Places 1–16 (max. 2 per NOC)	All-around	Azerbaijan; Belarus; Belarus; Bulgaria; Bulgaria; Israel; Israel; Italy; Italy; Japan; ROC; ROC; Ukraine; Ukraine; United States; United States
2021 FIG Rhythmic Gymnastics World Cup series Top 3 (max. 1 per NOC)	All-around	Ekaterina Vedeneeva (SLO); ~~Sabina Tashkenbaeva (UZB)~~; Ekaterina Fetisova (UZB); Chisaki Oiwa (JPN)
2021 Continental Championships; All-around (max. 1 per NOC)	Africa	Habiba Marzouk (EGY)
2021 Continental Championships; All-around (max. 1 per NOC)	Asia	Alina Adilkhanova (KAZ)
2021 Continental Championships; All-around (max. 1 per NOC)	Americas	Rut Castillo (MEX)
2021 Continental Championships; All-around (max. 1 per NOC)	Europe	Fanni Pigniczki (HUN)
2021 Continental Championships; All-around (max. 1 per NOC)	Oceania	Lidiia Iakovleva (AUS)
FIG Executive Board invitations	Host nation	Host nation qualified above
FIG Executive Board invitations	Tripartite invitation	Márcia Lopes (CPV)
2019 Rhythmic Gymnastics World Championships (Reallocation)	All-around	Salome Pazhava (GEO)
Total		26

=== Group all-around ===
Event	Standard	Qualified team
2018 Rhythmic Gymnastics World Championships; Team places 1–3	All-around	ROC; Italy; Bulgaria
2019 Rhythmic Gymnastics World Championships; Team places 1–5	All-around	Japan; Belarus; Israel; China; Azerbaijan
2020 Continental Championships; All-around (1 per continent)	Africa	Egypt
2020 Continental Championships; All-around (1 per continent)	Asia	Uzbekistan
2020 Continental Championships; All-around (1 per continent)	Americas	Brazil
2020 Continental Championships; All-around (1 per continent)	Europe	Ukraine
2020 Continental Championships; All-around (1 per continent)	Oceania	Australia
FIG Executive Board invitations	Host nation	Host nation qualified above
2019 Rhythmic Gymnastics World Championships (Reallocation)	All-around	United States
Total		14

== Trampoline ==
=== Men's events ===
Event	Standard	Quotas awarded	Qualified NOC	
2019 Trampoline World Championships	Top 8 (max. 1 per NOC)	5	China; Belarus; ROC; Japan; France	
2021 Continental Championships	1 per continent	0	Europe	Unused
2021 Continental Championships	1 per continent	0	Asia	Unused
2021 Continental Championships	1 per continent	1	Africa	Egypt
2021 Continental Championships	1 per continent	0	Oceania	Unused
2021 Continental Championships	1 per continent	1	Americas	Colombia
2019–2020 Trampoline World Cup series	Up to 14 gymnasts qualified	8	Belarus; China; ROC; Japan; New Zealand; Portugal; Australia; Ukraine	
Host nation	—	0	~~0–1 gymnasts~~	
Tripartite invitation	—	0	~~0–1 gymnasts~~	
Reallocation of Tripartite Commission	—	1	Aliaksei Shostak (USA)	
Total		16		

- Both the host quota and the tripartite quota were redistributed, as Japan qualified already and no eligible tripartite eligible countries competed at the 2019 Worlds.

=== Women's events ===
Event	Standard	Quotas awarded	Qualified NOC	
2019 Trampoline World Championships	Top 8 (max. 1 per NOC)	6	China; Japan; Great Britain; Canada; France; ROC	
2021 Continental Championships	1 per continent	0	Europe	Unused
2021 Continental Championships	1 per continent	0	Asia	Unused
2021 Continental Championships	1 per continent	1	Africa	Egypt
2021 Continental Championships	1 per continent	0	Oceania	Unused
2021 Continental Championships	1 per continent	0	Americas	Unused
2019–2020 Trampoline World Cup series	Up to 14 gymnasts qualified	8	China; Japan; Great Britain; ROC; United States; New Zealand; Australia; Mexico	
Host nation	—	0	~~0–1 gymnasts~~	
Tripartite invitation	—	0	~~0–1 gymnasts~~	
Reallocation of Host Country	—	1	Samantha Smith (CAN)	
Total		16		
