= 2019 FIG Artistic Gymnastics World Cup series =

International gymnastics competition series

FIG Artistic Gymnastics World Cup series
- Location: various — see locations
- Date: February 21 – November 24, 2019 see schedule

The 2019 FIG World Cup circuit in Artistic Gymnastics is a series of competitions officially organized and promoted by the International Gymnastics Federation (FIG) in 2019. All four of the Apparatus World Cup series competitions (Melbourne, Baku, Doha, and Cottbus) will serve as opportunities for gymnasts to earn points towards Olympic qualification through the FIG Artistic Gymnastics World Cup series route.

== Schedule ==
=== World Cup series ===
Date	Location	Event	Type
February 21–24	(Australia) Melbourne	FIG World Cup 2019	C III – Apparatus
March 2	(United States) Greensboro	American Cup FIG Individual All-Around World Cup 2019	C II – All-Around
March 14–17	(Azerbaijan) Baku	FIG Individual Apparatus World Cup, AGF Trophy 2019	C III – Apparatus
March 16–17	(Germany) Stuttgart	EnBW -DTB-Pokal FIG Individual All-Around World Cup 2019	C II – All-Around
March 20–23	(Qatar) Doha	FIG World Cup 2019	C III – Apparatus
March 23	(United Kingdom) Birmingham	FIG Individual All-Around World Cup 2019	C II – All-Around
April 7	(Japan) Tokyo	FIG Individual All-Around World Cup 2019	C II – All-Around
November 21–24	(Germany) Cottbus	44th Turnier der Meister FIG Individual Apparatus World Cup 2019	C III – Apparatus

=== World Challenge Cup series ===
Date	Location	Event	Type
May 19–21	(China) Zhaoqing	FIG World Challenge Cup	C III – Apparatus
May 23–26	(Croatia) Osijek	FIG World Challenge Cup	C III – Apparatus
May 30–June 2	(Slovenia) Koper	FIG World Challenge Cup	C III – Apparatus
August 30–September 1	(Turkey) Mersin	FIG World Challenge Cup	C III – Apparatus
September 6–8	(Hungary) Szombathely	FIG World Challenge Cup	C III – Apparatus
September 14–15	(France) Paris	FIG World Challenge Cup	C III – Apparatus
September 19–22	(Portugal) Guimarães	FIG World Challenge Cup	C III – Apparatus

== Medalists ==
=== Men ===
==== World Cup series ====
Competition	Event	Gold	Silver	Bronze
Melbourne	Floor Exercise	(Philippines) Carlos Yulo	(Japan) Hibiki Arayashiki	(Spain) Rayderley Zapata (United Kingdom) Dominick Cunningham
Melbourne	Pommel Horse	(Chinese Taipei) Lee Chih-kai	(China) Weng Hao	(Japan) Tomomasa Hasegawa
Melbourne	Rings	(China) Liu Yang	(China) You Hao	(Brazil) Arthur Zanetti
Melbourne	Vault	(Ukraine) Igor Radivilov	(France) Loris Frasca	(United Kingdom) Dominick Cunningham
Melbourne	Parallel Bars	(China) You Hao	(Turkey) Ahmet Önder	(Turkey) Ferhat Arıcan
Melbourne	Horizontal Bar	(Japan) Hidetaka Miyachi	(Netherlands) Epke Zonderland	(China) Zhang Chenglong
Greensboro	All-Around	(United States) Yul Moldauer	(United States) Sam Mikulak	(China) Ma Yue
Baku	Floor Exercise	(Israel) Artem Dolgopyat	(Switzerland) Pablo Braegger	(Spain) Rayderley Zapata
Baku	Pommel Horse	(Japan) Kohei Kameyama	(France) Cyril Tommasone	(China) Weng Hao
Baku	Rings	(United Kingdom) Courtney Tulloch	(Azerbaijan) Nikita Simonov	(Ukraine) Igor Radivilov
Baku	Vault	(South Korea) Yang Hak-seon	(Ukraine) Igor Radivilov	(Russia) Denis Ablyazin
Baku	Parallel Bars	(Russia) Vladislav Poliashov	(Turkey) Ferhat Arıcan	(China) You Hao
Baku	Horizontal Bar	(Netherlands) Epke Zonderland	(Croatia) Tin Srbić	(Switzerland) Oliver Hegi
Stuttgart	All-Around	(Russia) Artur Dalaloyan	(China) Sun Wei	(Ukraine) Petro Pakhniuk
Birmingham	All-Around	(Russia) Nikita Nagornyy	(China) Sun Wei	(Japan) Kazuma Kaya
Doha	Floor Exercise	(Israel) Alexander Shatilov	(Spain) Rayderley Zapata	(Philippines) Carlos Yulo
Doha	Pommel Horse	(Chinese Taipei) Lee Chih-kai	(Japan) Kohei Kameyama	(Japan) Kaito Imabayashi
Doha	Rings	(China) Lan Xingyu	(Armenia) Artur Tovmasyan	(Armenia) Vahagn Davtyan
Doha	Vault	(South Korea) Yang Hak-seon	(Ukraine) Igor Radivilov	(Armenia) Artur Davtyan
Doha	Parallel Bars	(China) Zou Jingyuan	(Russia) Vladislav Poliashov	(Australia) Mitchell Morgans
Doha	Horizontal Bar	(Croatia) Tin Srbić	(Japan) Hidetaka Miyachi	(Cuba) Randy Lerú
Tokyo	All-Around	(United States) Sam Mikulak	(Japan) Wataru Tanigawa	(Japan) Kenzo Shirai
Cottbus	Floor Exercise	(Japan) Kazuki Minami	(Spain) Rayderley Zapata	(United Kingdom) Hayden Skinner
Cottbus	Pommel Horse	(China) Weng Hao	(Japan) Kaito Imabayashi	(Ukraine) Oleg Verniaiev
Cottbus	Rings	(China) Liu Yang	(Greece) Eleftherios Petrounias	(Armenia) Artur Avetisyan
Cottbus	Vault	(Ukraine) Ihor Radivilov	(Dominican Republic) Audrys Nin Reyes	(Belarus) Yahor Sharamkou
Cottbus	Parallel Bars	(Ukraine) Oleg Verniaiev	(China) You Hao	(Russia) Vladislav Poliashov
Cottbus	Horizontal Bar	(Japan) Hidetaka Miyachi	(Cyprus) Ilias Georgiou	(Russia) Alexey Rostov

==== World Challenge Cup series ====
Competition	Event	Gold	Silver	Bronze
Zhaoqing	Floor Exercise	(China) Deng Shudi	(Japan) Takuya Sakakibara	(South Korea) Lee Seung-min
Zhaoqing	Pommel Horse	(China) Zou Jingyuan	(Republic of Ireland) Rhys McClenaghan	(China) Weng Hao
Zhaoqing	Rings	(China) Liu Yang	(South Korea) Jeon Yo-seop	(Japan) Takuya Sakakibara
Zhaoqing	Vault	(North Korea) Kim Hyok	(South Korea) Shin Jea-hwan	(Japan) Genta Tsuyuki
Zhaoqing	Parallel Bars	(China) Zou Jingyuan	(South Korea) Lee Seung-min	(North Korea) Ri Yong-min
Zhaoqing	Horizontal Bar	(Japan) Takuya Sakakibara	(China) Lin Chaopan	(South Korea) Lee Seung-min
Osijek	Floor Exercise	(Israel) Artem Dolgopyat	(Russia) Kirill Prokopev	(Chile) Tomás González
Osijek	Pommel Horse	(Croatia) Robert Seligman	(Russia) Nikolai Kuksenkov	(Azerbaijan) Ivan Tikhonov
Osijek	Rings	(Azerbaijan) Nikita Simonov	(Russia) Alexey Rostov	(Turkey) Yunus Gündoğdu
Osijek	Vault	(Hong Kong) Shek Wai Hung	(Italy) Andrea Cingolani	(Israel) Andrey Medvedev
Osijek	Parallel Bars	(Lithuania) Robert Tvorogal	(Turkey) Demir Sercan	(Russia) Alexandr Kartsev
Osijek	Horizontal Bar	(Russia) Alexey Rostov	(Russia) Alexandr Kartsev	(Cyprus) Ilias Georgiou
Koper	Floor Exercise	(Chile) Tomás González	(Kazakhstan) Milad Karimi	(Croatia) Aurel Benović
Koper	Pommel Horse	(Republic of Ireland) Rhys McClenaghan	(Kazakhstan) Ilyas Azizov	(Israel) Alexander Myakinin
Koper	Rings	(Azerbaijan) Nikita Simonov	(Egypt) Ali Zahran	(Italy) Salvatore Maresca
Koper	Vault	(Hong Kong) Shek Wai Hung	(Belarus) Yahor Sharamkou	(Israel) Andrey Medvedev
Koper	Parallel Bars	(United Kingdom) Frank Baines	(Kazakhstan) Milad Karimi	(Cyprus) Ilias Georgiou
Koper	Horizontal Bar	(Turkey) Ümit Şamiloğlu	(United Kingdom) Frank Baines	(Israel) Alexander Myakinin
Mersin	Floor Exercise	(Croatia) Aurel Benović	(Turkey) Mustafa Arca	(Slovenia) Rok Klavora
Mersin	Pommel Horse	(Slovenia) Sašo Bertoncelj	(Turkey) Ferhat Arıcan	(Turkey) Ahmet Önder
Mersin	Rings	(Turkey) İbrahim Çolak	(Turkey) Yunus Gündoğdu	(Azerbaijan) Javidan Babayev
Mersin	Vault	(Azerbaijan) Murad Agharzayev	(Bulgaria) David Huddleston	(Cyprus) Neofytos Kyriakou
Mersin	Parallel Bars	(Turkey) Ferhat Arıcan	(Turkey) Ahmet Önder	(Bulgaria) Yordan Aleksandrov
Mersin	Horizontal Bar	(Turkey) Ümit Şamiloğlu	(Turkey) Ahmet Önder	(Bulgaria) Yordan Aleksandrov
Szombathely	Floor Exercise	(Israel) Artem Dolgopyat	(Ukraine) Oleg Verniaiev	(Ukraine) Petro Pakhniuk
Szombathely	Pommel Horse	(United Kingdom) Joshua Nathan	(Ukraine) Oleg Verniaiev	(Slovenia) Sašo Bertoncelj
Szombathely	Rings	(Ukraine) Igor Radivilov	(Egypt) Ali Zahran	(Austria) Vinzenz Hoeck
Szombathely	Vault	(Japan) Hidenobu Yonekura	(Japan) Keitaro Okubo	(Norway) Sofus Heggemsnes
Szombathely	Parallel Bars	(Ukraine) Oleg Verniaiev	(Ukraine) Petro Pakhniuk	(Bulgaria) Yordan Aleksandrov
Szombathely	Horizontal Bar	(Hungary) Dávid Vecsernyés	(Ukraine) Petro Pakhniuk	(Israel) Alexander Myakinin
Paris	Floor Exercise	(Japan) Kazuki Minami	(Israel) Artem Dolgopyat	(Russia) Kirill Prokopev
Paris	Pommel Horse	(United Kingdom) Joshua Nathan	(Russia) Kirill Prokopev	(Canada) Thierry Pellerin
Paris	Rings	(Egypt) Ali Zahran (France) Samir Aït Saïd	—N/a	(Japan) Kentaro Yunoki
Paris	Vault	(France) Loris Frasca	(United Kingdom) Jake Jarman	(Spain) Adria Vera
Paris	Parallel Bars	(Japan) Kaito Sugimoto	(Russia) Sergei Eltcov	(Hungary) Ryan Sheppard
Paris	Horizontal Bar	(Croatia) Tin Srbić	(Russia) Sergei Eltcov	(Chinese Taipei) Tang Chia-hung
Guimarães	Floor Exercise	(Japan) Takaaki Sugino	(Mexico) Daniel Corral	(Finland) Patrick Palmroth
Guimarães	Pommel Horse	(Japan) Takaaki Sugino	(Mexico) Daniel Corral	(Italy) Yumin Abbadini
Guimarães	Rings	(Japan) Takuya Nagano	(Mexico) Fabian de Luna	(Portugal) Bernardo Almeida
Guimarães	Vault	(Poland) Sebastian Gawronski	(Mexico) Fabian de Luna	(Italy) Umberto Zurlini
Guimarães	Parallel Bars	(Japan) Takuya Nagano	(Mexico) Isaac Núñez	(Japan) Hirohito Kohama
Guimarães	Horizontal Bar	(Japan) Hirohito Kohama	(Mexico) Isaac Núñez	(Mexico) Kevin Cerda

===== World Challenge Cup series winners =====
Apparatus	Winner
Floor Exercise	(Israel) Artem Dolgopyat
Pommel Horse	(Republic of Ireland) Rhys McClenaghan
Rings	(Egypt) Ali Zahran
Vault	(Hong Kong) Shek Wai Hung
Parallel Bars	(Bulgaria) Yordan Aleksandrov
Horizontal Bar	(Turkey) Ümit Şamiloğlu

=== Women ===
==== World Cup series ====
Competition	Event	Gold	Silver	Bronze
Melbourne	Vault	(South Korea) Yeo Seo-jeong	(Uzbekistan) Oksana Chusovitina	(China) Yu Linmin
Melbourne	Uneven Bars	(China) Fan Yilin	(China) Lyu Jiaqi	(Australia) Georgia-Rose Brown
Melbourne	Balance Beam	(China) Zhao Shiting	(Australia) Emma Nedov	(Japan) Mana Oguchi
Melbourne	Floor Exercise	(Italy) Vanessa Ferrari	(Puerto Rico) Paula Mejías	(China) Zhao Shiting
Greensboro	All-Around	(United States) Leanne Wong	(United States) Grace McCallum	(Japan) Mai Murakami (Canada) Ellie Black
Baku	Vault	(United States) Jade Carey	(Uzbekistan) Oksana Chusovitina	(Mexico) Alexa Moreno
Baku	Uneven Bars	(China) Lyu Jiaqi	(Russia) Anastasia Ilyankova	(Australia) Georgia-Rose Brown
Baku	Balance Beam	(Australia) Emma Nedov	(France) Marine Boyer	(Japan) Mana Oguchi
Baku	Floor Exercise	(United States) Jade Carey	(Italy) Lara Mori	(Italy) Vanessa Ferrari
Stuttgart	All-Around	(United States) Simone Biles	(Canada) Ana Padurariu	(Germany) Elisabeth Seitz
Birmingham	All-Around	(Russia) Aliya Mustafina	(United States) Riley McCusker	(Brazil) Thaís Fidélis
Doha	Vault	(United States) Jade Carey	(Russia) Maria Paseka	(France) Coline Devillard
Doha	Uneven Bars	(Belgium) Nina Derwael	(China) Fan Yilin	(Russia) Anastasia Ilyankova
Doha	Balance Beam	(China) Li Qi	(Belgium) Nina Derwael	(France) Marine Boyer
Doha	Floor Exercise	(United States) Jade Carey	(Italy) Lara Mori	(Italy) Vanessa Ferrari
Tokyo	All-Around	(United States) Morgan Hurd	(Canada) Ellie Black	(Japan) Asuka Teramoto
Cottbus	Vault	(China) Yu Linmin	(Slovenia) Teja Belak	(Cuba) Yesenia Ferrera
Cottbus	Uneven Bars	(China) Fan Yilin	(Russia) Anastasia Agafonova	(China) Yin Sisi
Cottbus	Balance Beam	(Japan) Urara Ashikawa	(Ukraine) Diana Varinska	(China) Li Qi
Cottbus	Floor Exercise	(Ukraine) Anastasia Bachynska	(Germany) Kim Bùi	(Italy) Lara Mori

==== World Challenge Cup series ====
Competition	Event	Gold	Silver	Bronze
Zhaoqing	Vault	(China) Yu Linmin	(Uzbekistan) Oksana Chusovitina	(Malaysia) Yueh Tan Ing
Zhaoqing	Uneven Bars	(China) Li Shijia	(China) Liu Jingxing	(South Korea) Eom Do-hyun
Zhaoqing	Balance Beam	(China) Li Shijia	(China) Yin Sisi	(South Korea) Eom Do-hyun
Zhaoqing	Floor Exercise	(China) Liu Jingxing	(Malaysia) Yueh Tan Ing	(South Korea) Eom Do-hyun
Osijek	Vault	(Slovenia) Teja Belak	(Ukraine) Angelina Radivilova	(Slovenia) Tjaša Kysselef
Osijek	Uneven Bars	(Russia) Anastasia Agafonova	(Hungary) Nora Feher	(Ukraine) Yana Fedorova
Osijek	Balance Beam	(Ukraine) Angelina Radivilova	(Romania) Carmen Ghiciuc	(Romania) Alexandra Mihai
Osijek	Floor Exercise	(Croatia) Ana Đerek	(Ukraine) Angelina Radivilova	(Romania) Alexandra Mihai
Koper	Vault	(Azerbaijan) Marina Nekrasova	(Slovenia) Teja Belak	(Chile) Franchesca Santi
Koper	Uneven Bars	(Hungary) Zsófia Kovács	(Austria) Jasmin Mader	(Belarus) Aliaksandra Varabyova
Koper	Balance Beam	(Hungary) Zsófia Kovács	(Switzerland) Ilaria Käslin	(Egypt) Farah Hussein
Koper	Floor Exercise	(Switzerland) Ilaria Käslin	(Romania) Ana Maria Puiu	(Slovenia) Adela Šajn
Mersin	Vault	(Slovenia) Teja Belak	(Slovenia) Tjaša Kysselef	(Croatia) Tijana Tkalčec
Mersin	Uneven Bars	(Turkey) Nazlı Savranbaşı	(Republic of Ireland) Megan Ryan	(Republic of Ireland) Jane Heffernan
Mersin	Balance Beam	(Canada) Audrey Rousseau	(Slovenia) Teja Belak	(Vietnam) Katelyn Nguyễn
Mersin	Floor Exercise	(Turkey) Göksu Üçtaş Şanlı	(Turkey) Tutya Yılmaz	(Vietnam) Đoàn Trần
Szombathely	Vault	(Azerbaijan) Marina Nekrasova	(Slovenia) Teja Belak	(Ukraine) Angelina Radivilova
Szombathely	Uneven Bars	(South Africa) Caitlin Rooskrantz	(United Kingdom) Phoebe Jakubczyk	(Spain) Roxana Popa
Szombathely	Balance Beam	(Hungary) Noémi Makra	(Slovenia) Teja Belak	(Canada) Emma Spence
Szombathely	Floor Exercise	(Spain) Marina Gonzalez	(United Kingdom) Emily Thomas	(Ukraine) Angelina Radivilova
Paris	Vault	(Uzbekistan) Oksana Chusovitina	(Hungary) Sára Péter	(Chile) Franchesca Santi
Paris	Uneven Bars	(France) Mélanie de Jesus dos Santos	(Russia) Anastasia Agafonova	(Hungary) Zsófia Kovács
Paris	Balance Beam	(Russia) Anastasia Agafonova	(Ukraine) Anastasia Bachynska	(Ukraine) Diana Varinska
Paris	Floor Exercise	(Ukraine) Diana Varinska	(France) Marine Boyer	(Czech Republic) Aneta Holasová
Guimarães	Vault	(Puerto Rico) Paula Mejías	(Croatia) Tijana Tkalčec	(Canada) Sophie Marois
Guimarães	Uneven Bars	(Mexico) Frida Esparza	(Mexico) Elsa García	(Portugal) Ana Filipa Martins
Guimarães	Balance Beam	(Portugal) Ana Filipa Martins	(Croatia) Ana Đerek	(Canada) Sophie Marois
Guimarães	Floor Exercise	(Mexico) Ana Lago	(Mexico) Anapaula Gutiérrez	(Croatia) Ana Đerek

===== World Challenge Cup series winners =====
Apparatus	Winner
Vault	(Slovenia) Teja Belak
Uneven Bars	(Russia) Anastasia Agafonova
Balance Beam	(Slovenia) Teja Belak
Floor Exercise	(Croatia) Ana Đerek

== See also ==
- 2019 FIG Rhythmic Gymnastics World Cup series
