= Gymnastics at the 2020 Summer Olympics – Men's vault =

Olympic gymnastics event

Men's vault at the Games of the XXXII Olympiad
- Olympic artistic gymnastics
- Venue: Ariake Gymnastics Centre
- Dates: 24 July 2021 (qualifying); 2 August 2021 (final)
- Competitors: 8 from 6 nations
- Winning score: 14.783 points

Medalists
1st place, gold medalist(s)		Shin Jea-hwan	South Korea
2nd place, silver medalist(s)		Denis Ablyazin	ROC
3rd place, bronze medalist(s)		Artur Davtyan	Armenia

The men's vault event at the 2020 Summer Olympics was held on 24 July and 2 August 2021 at the Ariake Gymnastics Centre. Unlike the other apparatus events, vault requires gymnasts to perform two exercises in order for results to count towards the vault final; most of the gymnasts perform only one (if they are participating in team or individual all-around) or none (if they are participating in only other apparatus). Approximately 20 gymnasts from 15 nations (of the 98 total gymnasts) competed two vaults in the qualifying round.

Shin Jea-hwan of South Korea won the title on a tiebreaker over ROC's Denis Ablyazin. It is Shin's first Olympic medal, while Ablyazin won his third consecutive silver on vault. Artur Davtyan of Armenia earned the bronze medal, both his first individual medal and the first medal for Armenia in artistic gymnastics. Davtyan's medal is also the first for Armenia at the 2020 Olympics.

The medals for the competition were presented by Mikaela Cojuangco Jaworski, Philippines; IOC Executive Board Member, and the medalists' bouquets were presented by Nicolas Buompane, Switzerland; FIG Secretary General.

== Background ==
This was the 25th appearance of the event, which is one of the five apparatus events held every time there were apparatus events at the Summer Olympics (no apparatus events were held in 1900, 1908, 1912, or 1920).

== Qualification ==
A National Olympic Committee (NOC) could enter up to 6 qualified gymnasts: a team of 4 and up to 2 specialists. A total of 98 quota places are allocated to men's gymnastics.

The 12 teams that qualify will be able to send 4 gymnasts in the team competition, for a total of 48 of the 98 quota places. The top three teams at the 2018 World Artistic Gymnastics Championships (China, Russia, and Japan) and the top nine teams (excluding those already qualified) at the 2019 World Artistic Gymnastics Championships (Ukraine, Great Britain, Switzerland, the United States, Chinese Taipei, South Korea, Brazil, Spain, and Germany) earned team qualification places.

The remaining 50 quota places are awarded individually. Each gymnast can only earn one place, except that gymnasts that competed with a team that qualified are eligible to earn a second place through the 2020 All Around World Cup Series. Some of the individual events are open to gymnasts from NOCs with qualified teams, while others are not. These places are filled through various criteria based on the 2019 World Championships, the 2020 FIG Artistic Gymnastics World Cup series, continental championships, a host guarantee, and a Tripartite Commission invitation.

Each of the 98 qualified gymnasts are eligible for the vault competition, but due to the requirement that the gymnast perform two vault exercises in the qualifying round (rather than the one needed to count for team and individual all-around events), many gymnasts do not attempt to qualify for the vault final.

The COVID-19 pandemic delayed many of the events for qualifying for gymnastics. The 2018 and 2019 World Championships were completed on time, but many of the World Cup series events were delayed into 2021.

== Competition format ==
The top 8 qualifiers in the qualification phase (limit two per NOC) advanced to the apparatus final. For the vault, only gymnasts who performed two exercises on the vault were considered for the final; the average score of the two exercises was counted. The finalists again performed two vaults. Qualification scores were then ignored, with only final round scores (average of the two exercises) counting.

== Schedule ==
The competition was held over two days, 24 July and 2 August. The qualifying round (for all men's gymnastics events) was the first day with the apparatus final on the second day.

All times are Japan Standard Time (UTC+9)

Date	Time	Round	Subdivision
24 July	10:00	Qualification	Subdivision 1
24 July	14:30	Qualification	Subdivision 2
24 July	19:30	Qualification	Subdivision 3
2 August	18:50	Final	–
All times are local time (UTC+09:00).

== Results ==
=== Qualifying ===
Rank	Gymnast	Vault 1				Vault 2				Total	Results
Rank	Gymnast	D Score	E Score	Penalty	Score 1	D Score	E Score	Penalty	Score 2	Total	Results
1	Shin Jea-hwan (KOR)	6.0	9.100		15.100	5.6	9.033		14.633	14.866	Q
2	Artur Davtyan (ARM)	5.6	9.133		14.733	5.6	9.400		15.000	14.866	Q
3	Nikita Nagornyy (ROC)	5.6	9.100		14.700	5.6	9.266		14.866	14.783	Q
4	Adem Asil (TUR)	6.0	9.100		15.100	5.6	8.833		14.433	14.766	Q
5	Denis Ablyazin (ROC)	5.6	9.300		14.900	5.6	8.966		14.566	14.733	Q
6	Carlos Yulo (PHI)	5.6	9.166		14.766	5.6	9.058		14.658	14.712	Q
7	Caio Souza (BRA)	5.6	9.000		14.600	5.6	9.200		14.800	14.700	Q
8	Ahmet Önder (TUR)	5.2	9.133		14.333	5.6	9.000		14.600	14.466	Q
9	Yang Hak-seon (KOR)	5.6	9.266		14.866	6.0	7.966	0.100	13.866	14.366	R1
10	Kim Han-sol (KOR)	5.6	8.933	0.300	14.233	5.2	9.233		14.433	14.333	–
11	Lee Jun-ho (KOR)	5.6	8.833		14.433	5.2	9.033		14.233	14.333	–
12	Shek Wai Hung (HKG)	6.0	9.016	0.300	14.716	6.0	7.933	0.100	13.833	14.274	R2
13	Nicolau Mir (ESP)	5.6	8.566	0.300	13.866	5.2	9.200		14.400	14.133	R3

Reserves

The reserves for the men's vault final were:

1. Yang Hak-seon (KOR)
2. Shek Wai Hung (HKG)
3. Nicolau Mir (ESP)

Only two gymnasts from each country may advance to the event final. No gymnasts were excluded from the final because of the quota, although Korean gymnasts Kim Han-sol and Lee Jun-ho were excluded as reserves due to the two-per-country rule.

Although both Shin Jea-hwan of South Korea and Artur Davtyan of Armenia both posted the highest average combined score of 14.866, the former was placed ahead because tie-breaking rules dictated his highest single combined score (15.100 versus 15.000) determine final rankings.

=== Final ===
Position	Gymnast	Vault 1				Vault 2				Total
Position	Gymnast	D Score	E Score	Penalty	Score 1	D Score	E Score	Penalty	Score 2	Total
Gold medal	Shin Jea-hwan (KOR)	6.0	8.833	0.100	14.733	5.6	9.233		14.833	14.783
Silver medal	Denis Ablyazin (ROC)	5.6	9.166		14.766	5.6	9.200		14.800	14.783
Bronze medal	Artur Davtyan (ARM)	5.6	9.200		14.800	5.6	9.166	0.100	14.666	14.733
4	Carlos Yulo (PHI)	5.6	9.066	0.100	14.566	5.6	9.266		14.866	14.716
5	Nikita Nagornyy (ROC)	5.6	9.233		14.833	5.6	9.000		14.600	14.716
6	Adem Asil (TUR)	6.0	9.266		15.266	5.6	8.033		13.633	14.449
7	Ahmet Önder (TUR)	5.2	8.633		13.833	5.2	9.100		14.300	14.066
8	Caio Souza (BRA)	5.6	8.866		14.466	5.2	7.700		12.900	13.683

Gold medalist Shin Jea-hwan and silver medalist Denis Ablyazin finished with identical scores of 14.783 points. According to the FIG's tie-breaking procedure, Shin prevailed due to having the higher single individual vault score (14.833 vs 14.800). It was Ablyazin’s third Olympic silver medal in a row in individual vault finals, and this was also the second time at these Olympics that the tie-breaking procedure had worked in Shin's favour as the same situation happened in vault qualifications. Fourth- and fifth-place finishers, Carlos Yulo and Nikita Nagornyy respectively, also tied on total score (14.716 points), but Yulo earned the higher placement due to his single higher individual vault score (14.866 vs 14.833).
