= Shin Jea-hwan =

South Korean artistic gymnast (born 1998)

Shin Jea-hwan 신재환
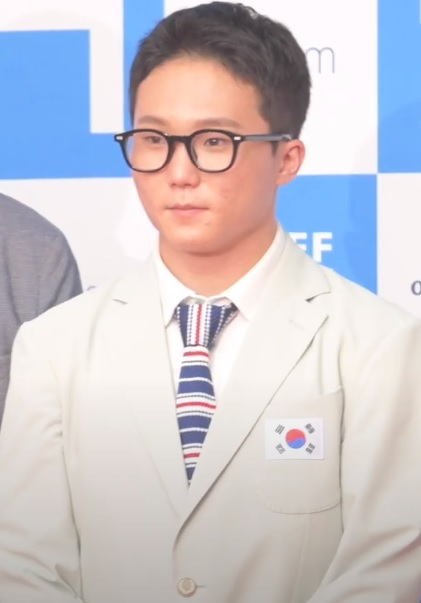
- Shin in 2021

Personal information
- Alternative names: Shin Jeahwan; Shin Jeah-wan; Shin Jae-hwan
- Born: March 3, 1998 (age 28) Seoul, South Korea

Gymnastics career
- Discipline: Men's artistic gymnastics
- Country represented: South Korea
- Club: Jecheon City Hall
Medal record
Men's artistic gymnastics
Representing South Korea
Event	1st	2nd	3rd
Olympic Games	1	0	0
FIG World Cup	2	1	0
Total	3	1	0
Olympic Games
Gold medal – first place	2020 Tokyo	Vault
FIG World Cup
Gold medal – first place	2020 Baku	Vault
Gold medal – first place	2020 Melbourne	Vault
Silver medal – second place	2019 Zhaoqing	Vault

Korean name
- Hangul: 신재환
- RR: Sin Jaehwan
- MR: Sin Chaehwan

Shin Jea-hwan (Korean: 신재환; born March 3, 1998) is a South Korean artistic gymnast. He is the 2020 Summer Olympic champion on vault. He is a two-time World Cup champion on vault (2020 Melbourne, 2020 Baku).

== Personal life ==
Shin was born on March 3, 1998, in Seoul. He attended the Korea National Sport University and graduated in 2020. Shin relocated to Jecheon in 2021. He looks up to teammate Yang Hak-seon.

== Career ==
Shin made his senior international debut at the 2019 Zhaoqing World Cup, where he won silver on vault and finished fourth on floor.

Shin competed on vault and floor at several events on the 2020 World Cup circuit and won two golds on vault. After points were re-allocated to eligible gymnasts following the 2019 World Championships, he was leading the series to qualify for the 2020 Summer Olympics when the COVID-19 pandemic curtailed the 2020 series.

In 2021, the International Gymnastics Federation decided at the last minute to hold the final event in the qualification process, the 2021 Doha World Cup; Shin chose to attend to preserve his series lead over Japanese gymnast Hidenobu Yonekura. Despite placing fifth to Yonekura's first in Doha, Shin was able to win the overall series on a tiebreaker and qualify as an individual for the Olympic Games in Tokyo.

At 2020 Summer Olympics held in Tokyo, he qualified for vault final in first place winning the tiebreak against Armenia's Artur Davtyan with both men scoring 14.866, but he ranked ahead due to his higher individual vault score (15.100 vs 15.000). In the vault final, he won the gold after ranking ahead in the tiebreak once more, this time against Denis Ablyazin of ROC. Both men scored 14.783, but he won yet again due to having his higher individual vault score (14.833 vs 14.800). This is South Korea's second gold medal on the vault apparatus after Yang Hak-seon won it at the 2012 Summer Olympics in London.
