= 2020 FIG Artistic Gymnastics World Cup series =

International gymnastics competition series

FIG Artistic Gymnastics World Cup series
- Location: various — see locations
- Date: February 20 – October 4, 2020 see schedule

The 2020 FIG World Cup circuit in Artistic Gymnastics is a series of competitions officially organized and promoted by the International Gymnastics Federation (FIG) in 2020. A number of events were originally scheduled to take place in 2020 and serve as opportunities for gymnasts to earn points towards Olympic qualification. However, the organization of many events was heavily affected by the worldwide COVID-19 pandemic, resulting in either cancelation or postponement of some events to 2021.

Two of the Apparatus World Cup series competitions (Melbourne and Baku), as well as the American Cup All-Around World Cup in Milwaukee, were held and counted towards Olympic qualification through the FIG Artistic Gymnastics World Cup series route. Additionally, the Szombathely World Challenge Cup was the sole representative of the World Challenge Cup series staged in 2020, and did not affect the ranking for Olympic qualification.

== Schedule ==
=== World Cup series ===
Date	Location	Event	Type
February 20–23, 2020	(Australia) Melbourne	FIG World Cup 2020	C III - Apparatus
March 7, 2020	(United States) Milwaukee	American Cup FIG Individual All-Around World Cup 2020	C II - All-Around
March 12–15, 2020	(Azerbaijan) Baku	FIG Individual Apparatus World Cup, AGF Trophy 2020	C III - Apparatus

Note
1.Canceled midway due to the COVID-19 pandemic in Azerbaijan. Results of the qualification stage were considered as the final rankings.

=== World Challenge Cup series ===
Date	Location	Event	Type
October 1–4, 2020	(Hungary) Szombathely	FIG World Challenge Cup	C III - Apparatus

=== Events canceled or postponed ===
Date	Location	Event	Type	Status
June 26–28, 2020	(Turkey) Mersin	FIG World Challenge Cup	C III - Apparatus	Canceled due to the COVID-19 pandemic in Turkey
March 10–13, 2021	(Qatar) Doha	FIG World Cup	C III - Apparatus	Postponed to 2021 due to the COVID-19 pandemic in Qatar
March 21–22, 2021	(Germany) Stuttgart	EnBW -DTB-Pokal FIG Individual All-Around World Cup	C II - All-Around	Postponed to 2021 due to the COVID-19 pandemic in Germany
March 27, 2021	(United Kingdom) Birmingham	FIG Individual All-Around World Cup	C II - All-Around	Postponed to 2021 due to the COVID-19 pandemic in the United Kingdom
May 2 or 9, 2021 (TBC)	(Japan) Tokyo	FIG Individual All-Around World Cup	C II - All-Around	Postponed to 2021 due to the COVID-19 pandemic in Japan
May 27–30, 2021	(Bulgaria) Varna	FIG World Challenge Cup	C III - Apparatus	Postponed to 2021 due to the COVID-19 pandemic in Bulgaria
June 3–6, 2021	(Egypt) Cairo	FIG World Challenge Cup	C III - Apparatus	Postponed to 2021 due to the COVID-19 pandemic in Egypt
June 10–13, 2021	(Croatia) Osijek	FIG World Challenge Cup	C III - Apparatus	Postponed to 2021 due to the COVID-19 pandemic in Croatia
September 2–5, 2021	(Slovenia) Koper	FIG World Challenge Cup	C III - Apparatus	Postponed due to the COVID-19 pandemic in Slovenia

== Medalists ==
=== Men ===
==== World Cup series ====
===== All-Around =====
The three federations who earn the most points through the Individual All-Around World Cups will earn an additional Olympic spot in addition to their 4-person team. Whoever places first earns 60 points for their country and each subsequent placement is five less points. The total points earned is the summation of total points from all four events in the series. Three events in the series were moved to 2021 due to the global COVID-19 pandemic.

Competition	Event	Gold	Silver	Bronze
Milwaukee	All-Around	(United States) Sam Mikulak	(Ukraine) Oleg Verniaiev	(United Kingdom) James Hall

===== Apparatus =====
An athlete can earn Olympic qualification points at each Apparatus World Cup in 2020. The athlete who earned the spot on each apparatus will be announced after the conclusion of the Doha World Cup, which was moved to 2021 due to the global COVID-19 pandemic.

Competition	Event	Gold	Silver	Bronze
Melbourne	Floor Exercise	(South Korea) Ryu Sung-hyun	(Russia) Kirill Prokopev	(Kazakhstan) Milad Karimi
Melbourne	Pommel Horse	(United States) Stephen Nedoroscik	(Iran) Saeid Reza Keikha	(Japan) Kohei Kameyama
Melbourne	Rings	(Greece) Eleftherios Petrounias	(Iran) Mehdi Ahmad Kohani	(Egypt) Ali Zahran
Melbourne	Vault	(South Korea) Shin Jea-hwan	(Guatemala) Jorge Vega	(Israel) Andrey Medvedev
Melbourne	Parallel Bars	(Russia) Vladislav Polyashov	(Japan) Yusuke Tanaka	(Vietnam) Đinh Phương Thành
Melbourne	Horizontal Bar	(Netherlands) Epke Zonderland	(Kazakhstan) Milad Karimi	(Australia) Mitchell Morgans
Baku	Floor Exercise	(Turkey) Abdelrahman Elgamal	(Russia) Kirill Prokopev	(Kazakhstan) Milad Karimi
Baku	Pommel Horse	(China) Weng Hao	(Japan) Takaaki Sugino	(Iran) Saeid Reza Keikha
Baku	Rings	(Greece) Eleftherios Petrounias	(China) Liu Yang	(China) Lan Xingyu
Baku	Vault	(South Korea) Shin Jea-hwan	(Israel) Andrey Medvedev	(Ukraine) Igor Radivilov
Baku	Parallel Bars	(China) You Hao	(Russia) Vladislav Polyashov	(Turkey) Ferhat Arıcan
Baku	Horizontal Bar	(Turkey) Ümit Şamiloğlu	(Netherlands) Epke Zonderland (Russia) Alexey Rostov	None awarded

==== World Challenge Cup series ====
One event in the series was canceled, and four other events were moved to 2021 due to the global COVID-19 pandemic.

Competition	Event	Gold	Silver	Bronze
Szombathely	Floor Exercise	(Slovenia) Rok Klavora	(Kazakhstan) Ilyas Azizov	(Ukraine) Petro Pakhniuk
Szombathely	Pommel Horse	(Kazakhstan) Nariman Kurbanov	(Croatia) Robert Seligman	(Albania) Matvei Petrov
Szombathely	Rings	(Austria) Vinzenz Höck	(Ukraine) Igor Radivilov	(Ukraine) Yevgen Yudenkov
Szombathely	Vault	(Ukraine) Igor Radivilov	(Czech Republic) Ondřej Kalný	(Poland) Sebastian Gawronski
Szombathely	Parallel Bars	(Ukraine) Petro Pakhniuk	(Kazakhstan) Milad Karimi	(Ukraine) Yevgen Yudenkov
Szombathely	Horizontal Bar	(Croatia) Tin Srbić	(Kazakhstan) Milad Karimi	(Hungary) Dávid Vecsernyés

=== Women ===
==== World Cup series ====
===== All-Around =====
The three federations who earn the most points through the Individual All-Around World Cups will earn an additional Olympic spot in addition to their 4-person team. Whoever places first earns 60 points for their country and each subsequent placement is five less points. The total points earned is the summation of total points from all four events in the series. Three events in the series were moved to 2021 due to the global COVID-19 pandemic.

Competition	Event	Gold	Silver	Bronze
Milwaukee	All-Around	(United States) Morgan Hurd	(United States) Kayla DiCello	(Japan) Hitomi Hatakeda

===== Apparatus =====
An athlete can earn Olympic qualification points at each Apparatus World Cup in 2020. The athlete who earned the spot on each apparatus will be announced after the conclusion of the Doha World Cup, which was moved to 2021 due to the global COVID-19 pandemic.

Competition	Event	Gold	Silver	Bronze
Melbourne	Vault	(United States) Jade Carey	(France) Coline Devillard	(Japan) Shoko Miyata
Melbourne	Uneven Bars	(Ukraine) Diana Varinska	(Australia) Georgia Godwin	(Russia) Daria Spiridonova
Melbourne	Balance Beam	(Japan) Urara Ashikawa	(United Kingdom) Ondine Achampong	(Ukraine) Anastasiia Bachynska
Melbourne	Floor Exercise	(United States) Jade Carey	(Italy) Vanessa Ferrari	(Italy) Lara Mori
Baku	Vault	(Slovenia) Teja Belak	(France) Coline Devillard	(Azerbaijan) Marina Nekrasova
Baku	Uneven Bars	(China) Fan Yilin	(Russia) Anastasia Ilyankova	(Brazil) Rebeca Andrade
Baku	Balance Beam	(Japan) Urara Ashikawa	(Brazil) Rebeca Andrade	(Ukraine) Anastasiia Bachynska
Baku	Floor Exercise	(Italy) Lara Mori	(Italy) Vanessa Ferrari	(Canada) Audrey Rousseau

==== World Challenge Cup series ====
One event in the series was canceled, and four other events were moved to 2021 due to the global COVID-19 pandemic.

Competition	Event	Gold	Silver	Bronze
Szombathely	Vault	(Hungary) Boglárka Dévai	(Ukraine) Anastasiia Motak	(Ukraine) Angelina Radivilova
Szombathely	Uneven Bars	(Ukraine) Diana Varinska	(Germany) Lara Hinsberger	(Germany) Lisa Zimmermann
Szombathely	Balance Beam	(Croatia) Christina Zwicker	(Latvia) Elīna Vihrova	(Czech Republic) Aneta Holasová
Szombathely	Floor Exercise	(Ukraine) Angelina Radivilova	(Poland) Marta Pihan-Kulesza	(Germany) Lisa Zimmermann

=== Medal table ===
==== Overall ====
Rank	Nation	Gold	Silver	Bronze	Total
1	Ukraine	5	3	7	15
2	United States	5	1	0	6
3	China	3	1	1	5
4	South Korea	3	0	0	3
5	Japan	2	2	3	7
6	Croatia	2	1	0	3
7	Turkey	2	0	1	3
8	Greece	2	0	0	2
8	Slovenia	2	0	0	2
10	Russia	1	5	1	7
11	Kazakhstan	1	4	2	7
12	Italy	1	2	1	4
13	Netherlands	1	1	0	2
14	Hungary	1	0	1	2
15	Austria	1	0	0	1
16	Iran	0	2	1	3
17	France	0	2	0	2
18	Germany	0	1	2	3
19	Australia	0	1	1	2
19	Brazil	0	1	1	2
19	Czech Republic	0	1	1	2
19	Great Britain	0	1	1	2
19	Israel	0	1	1	2
19	Poland	0	1	1	2
25	Guatemala	0	1	0	1
25	Latvia	0	1	0	1
27	Albania	0	0	1	1
27	Azerbaijan	0	0	1	1
27	Canada	0	0	1	1
27	Egypt	0	0	1	1
27	Vietnam	0	0	1	1
Totals (31 entries)		32	33	31	96

== See also ==
- 2021 FIG Artistic Gymnastics World Cup series
