= Lara Mori =

Italian artistic gymnast (born 1998)

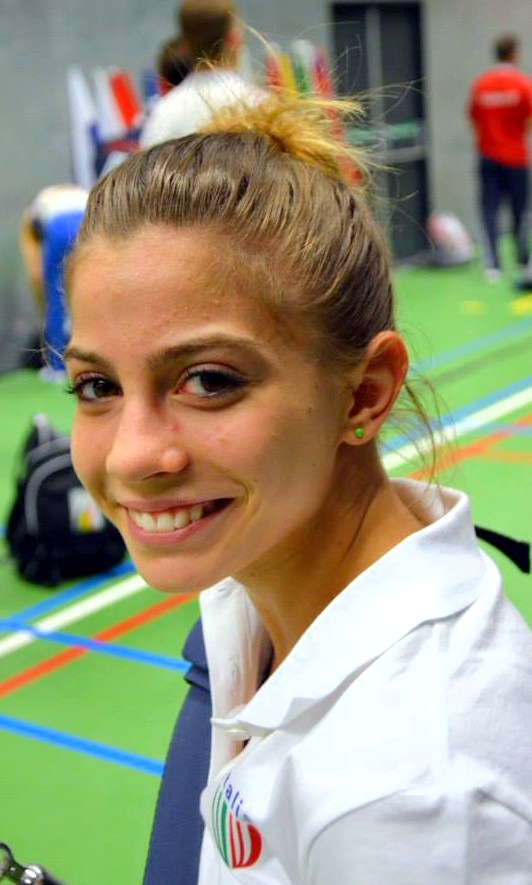
- Mori at the 2013 European Youth Olympic Festival.

Personal information
- Born: 26 July 1998 (age 28) Montevarchi, Italy
- Height: 1.50 m (4 ft 11 in)

Gymnastics career
- Discipline: Women's artistic gymnastics
- Country represented: Italy (2010–2023)
- Club: Ginnica Giglio
- Head coach: Stefania Bucci
Medal record
Representing Italy
Summer Universiade
Silver medal – second place	2019 Naples	Balance Beam
Bronze medal – third place	2019 Naples	Team
Mediterranean Games
Gold medal – first place	2018 Tarragona	Team
Gold medal – first place	2018 Tarragona	All-Around
Gold medal – first place	2018 Tarragona	Floor Exercise
FIG World Cup
Event / 1st / 2nd / 3rd; World Cup / 0 / 3 / 2

Lara Mori (born 26 July 1998) is a former Italian artistic gymnast who represented Italy at the 2020 Summer Olympics. She is the 2018 Mediterranean Games champion in the all-around, on the floor exercise, and with the Italian team. She is the 2019 Summer Universiade silver medalist on the balance beam and bronze medalist with the team.

== Junior career ==
Mori made her international debut at the 2012 City of Jesolo Trophy and helped the Italian team win the silver medal behind the United States. Individually, she finished sixth in the all-around. She then competed alongside Elisa Meneghini, Enus Mariani, Tea Ugrin, and Alessia Leolini at the 2012 Junior European Championships where they won the team silver medal behind the Russian team. She was selected to compete at the 2013 European Youth Summer Olympic Festival with Martina Rizzelli and Tea Ugrin, and they placed fifth in the team competition. Mori finished thirteenth in the all-around final.

== Senior career ==
=== 2014 ===
Mori made her senior debut at the 1st Italian Serie A where Mori helped her club, Ginnica Giglio, place fifth. Then at the 2nd Italian Serie A, her club won the silver medal behind Brixia. Mori made her senior international debut at the City of Jesolo Trophy and helped the Italian team win the silver medal behind the United States. At the 3rd Italian Serie A, she helped her club finish seventh.

At the Italian Championships, Mori finished sixth in the all-around, placed fourth in the uneven bars event final, and won the silver medal on the floor exercise behind Elisa Meneghini. She then helped Italy win the team gold medal at the Novara Cup. Then at the Golden League, she finished seventh in the all-around and eighth on the uneven bars, and she won the silver medal on the floor exercise behind Erika Fasana. She then competed at the World Championships alongside Fasana, Vanessa Ferrari, Giorgia Campana, Martina Rizzelli, and Lavinia Marongiu, and they finished fifth in the team final. Her final event of the year was the Élite Gym Massilia where she won the bronze medal on the floor exercise behind Axelle Klinckaert and Olivia Cîmpian.

=== 2015 ===
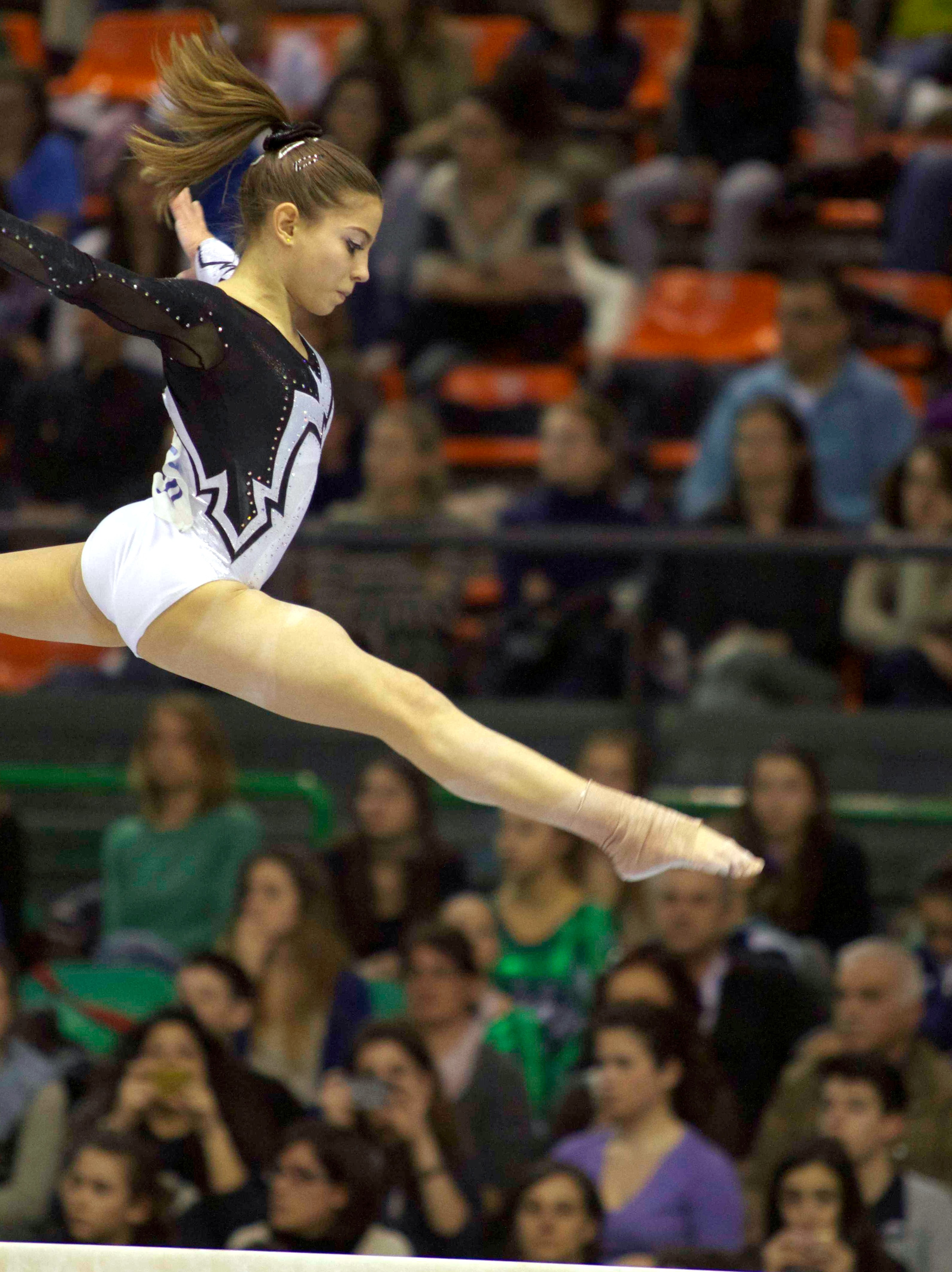
Mori on the balance beam in 2013.

Mori competed at the 1st Italian Serie A and helped her club finish fourth. They then won the bronze medal at the 2nd Italian Serie A. Then at the 3rd Italian Serie A, they finished fifth. In March, Mori had an ankle injury. She returned in September at the Golden League, she finished fourth with her club, in the all-around, and on the uneven bars, and she won the bronze medal on the balance beam. At the Italian Championships, she finished fourth in the all-around and sixth on the floor exercise, and she won the bronze medal on the uneven bars and the silver medal on the balance beam. At the Novara Cup, she helped the Italian team win the silver medal behind Romania. She competed at the 2015 World Championships alongside Carlotta Ferlito, Erika Fasana, Elisa Meneghini, Enus Mariani, and Tea Ugrin, and they finished seventh in the team final. Her final meet of the season was the Mexican Open where she finished fifth in the all-around.

=== 2016 ===
At the 1st Italian Serie A, Mori helped Ginnica Giglio win the bronze medal, and she placed fourth in the all-around. Then at the 2nd Italian Serie A, her club finished fourth, and she won the bronze medal in the all-around. She once again won the bronze medal in the all-around at the 3rd Italian Serie A, and her club won the bronze medal. She participated in the Olympic Test Event and finished fifteenth in the all-around. She won another all-around bronze medal at the 4th Italian Serie A. She competed at the European Championships with Elisa Meneghini, Enus Mariani, Martina Rizzelli, and Sofia Busato, and they finished fifth in the team final. At the Italian Championships, she finished fourth in the all-around and won the bronze medal on the balance beam. She was selected as the alternate for the 2016 Olympic team.

=== 2017 ===
Mori finished eighth in the all-around at the 1st Italian Serie A. She then competed only on the uneven bars at the City of Jesolo Trophy, but she did not qualify for the event final. She then finished fourth in the all-around at the 2nd Italian Serie A and helped her club finish fifth. At the European Championships, she finished fifth in the floor exercise event final. Then at the 3rd Italian Serie A, she won the silver medal in the all-around behind Martina Maggio. She finished ninth in the all-around and sixth on the balance beam at the Italian Championships, and she won the gold medal on the floor exercise. She won the bronze medal in the all-around at the 4th Italian Serie A. At the World Championships, she finished twelfth in the all-around final and sixth in the floor exercise event final.

=== 2018 ===
At the 1st Italian Serie A, Mori finished fourth with her club and fifth in the all-around. She then competed at the Doha World Cup where she finished eighth on the uneven bars and fourth on the floor exercise. She helped the Italian team win the bronze medal at the City of Jesolo Trophy, and she finished thirteenth in the all-around and seventh on the balance beam. At the 2nd Italian Serie A, she finished tenth in the all-around and seventh with her club. She then finished sixth in the all-around at the 3rd Italian Serie A. She was selected to represent Italy at the 2018 Mediterranean Games, and she helped the team win the gold medal. She then won the gold medals in the individual all-around and on the floor exercise.

Mori won the gold medal on the floor exercise at the Italian Championships. Then at the Rüsselsheim Friendly, she helped the Italian team win the silver medal behind Germany, and she finished fourth in the all-around. She then competed at the World Championships alongside Irene Lanza, Martina Basile, Sara Ricciardi, and Martina Rizzelli, but they did not qualify for the team final. Individually, she finished twenty-second in the all-around final. After the World Championships, she competed at the Cottbus World Cup and finished fourth on the floor exercise. This was her first result for the Olympic qualification through the World Cup series. Her final meet of the season was the Joaquin Blume Memorial, and she finished fourth in the all-around.

=== 2019 ===
Mori won the silver medal in the all-around behind Giorgia Villa at the 1st Italian Serie A. She then competed at the Baku World Cup and won the silver medal on the floor exercise behind Jade Carey. She once again won a silver medal on the floor exercise behind Carey at the Doha World Cup. She won the gold medal in the all-around at the 2nd Italian Serie A and the bronze medal in the all-around at the 3rd Italian Serie A. She then represented Italy at the 2019 Summer Universiade alongside Carlotta Ferlito and Martina Rizzelli, and they won the team bronze medal behind Japan and Russia. Mori finished fifth in the all-around final and won the silver medal on the balance beam behind Hitomi Hatakeda. At the Italian Championships, she finished seventh on the balance beam and won the silver medal on the floor exercise behind Desiree Carofiglio. She won the bronze medal on the floor exercise behind Anastasiia Bachynska and Kim Bui at the Cottbus World Cup.

=== 2020 ===
At the 1st Italian Serie A, Mori finished fourth in the all-around and won the bronze medal with her club. Then at the Melbourne World Cup, she won the bronze medal on the floor exercise behind Jade Carey and Vanessa Ferrari. In March, she went to the Baku World Cup and qualified for the floor exercise final in first place. However, the event finals were canceled due to the COVID-19 pandemic in Azerbaijan. In April, the International Gymnastics Federation decided that the results of the qualification round would be considered the final results for the purpose of awarded points in the 2020 Olympic qualification system- meaning Mori received 30 points for finishing in first place. In October, she competed at the 3rd Italian Serie A and won the silver medal in the all-around behind Martina Maggio.

=== 2021 ===
In March, Mori won a bronze medal with her club at the 1st Italian Serie A. Then at the 2nd Italian Serie A, she won a silver medal with her club and finished ninth in the all-around. Her club then finished ninth at the 3rd Italian Serie A. In June, she competed at the Doha World Cup and won the silver medal on the floor exercise behind Vanessa Ferrari. At the conclusion of the World Cup series, Ferrari earned the individual Olympic berth via floor exercise with a total of 85 points; Mori finished directly after her with 80 points.

At the Italian Championships, Olympic team member Giorgia Villa was injured and had to withdraw from the Olympic team. Ferrari was then added to the four person team, and her individual spot was reallocated to Mori. Mori then represented Italy at the 2020 Summer Olympics. In the qualification round, she scored 12.133 on the balance beam and 13.400 on the floor exercise, but she did not qualify for any event finals.

== Competitive history ==
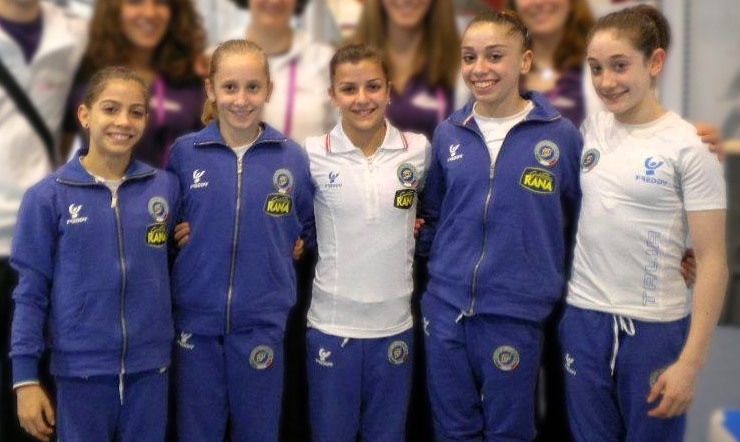
From left to right: Lara Mori, Tea Ugrin, Elisa Meneghini, Enus Mariani, and Alessia Leolini at the 2012 Junior European Championships.

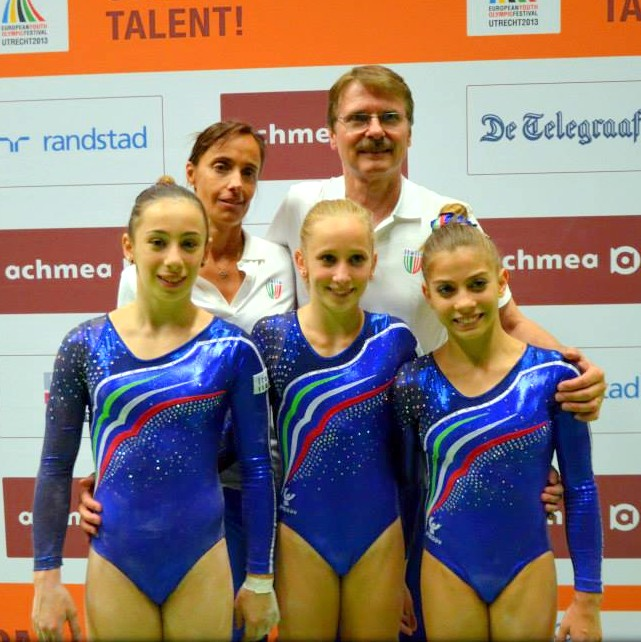
From left to right: Martina Rizzelli, Tea Ugrin, and Lara Mori at the 2013 European Youth Summer Olympic Festival.

Year	Event	Team	AA	VT	UB	BB	FX
2012	City of Jesolo Trophy	2nd place, silver medalist(s)	6				
2012	Junior European Championships	2nd place, silver medalist(s)					
2013	European Youth Olympic Festival	5	13				
2014	1st Italian Serie A	5					
2014	2nd Italian Serie A	2nd place, silver medalist(s)					
2014	City of Jesolo Trophy	2nd place, silver medalist(s)	22				
2014	3rd Italian Serie A	7					
2014	Italian Championships		6		4		2nd place, silver medalist(s)
2014	Novara Cup	1st place, gold medalist(s)	10				
2014	Golden League		7		8		2nd place, silver medalist(s)
2014	World Championships	5					
2014	Élite Gym Massilia						3rd place, bronze medalist(s)
2015	1st Italian Serie A	4					
2015	2nd Italian Serie A	3rd place, bronze medalist(s)					
2015	3rd Italian Serie A	5					
2015	Golden League	4	4		4	3rd place, bronze medalist(s)	
2015	Italian Championships		4		3rd place, bronze medalist(s)	2nd place, silver medalist(s)	6
2015	Novara Cup	2nd place, silver medalist(s)	14				
2015	World Championships	7					
2015	Mexican Open		5				
2016	1st Italian Serie A	3rd place, bronze medalist(s)	4				
2016	2nd Italian Serie A	4	3rd place, bronze medalist(s)				
2016	3rd Italian Serie A	3rd place, bronze medalist(s)	3rd place, bronze medalist(s)				
2016	Olympic Test Event		15				
2016	4th Italian Serie A	4	3rd place, bronze medalist(s)				
2016	European Championships	5					
2016	Italian Championships		4			3rd place, bronze medalist(s)	
2017	1st Italian Serie A	11	8				
2017	City of Jesolo Trophy		33				
2017	2nd Italian Serie A	5	4				
2017	European Championships						5
2017	3rd Italian Serie A	2nd place, silver medalist(s)	2nd place, silver medalist(s)				
2017	Italian Championships		9			6	1st place, gold medalist(s)
2017	4th Italian Serie A	6	3rd place, bronze medalist(s)				
2017	World Championships		12				6
2018	1st Italian Serie A	4	5				
2018	Doha World Cup				8		4
2018	City of Jesolo Trophy	3rd place, bronze medalist(s)	13			7	
2018	2nd Italian Serie A	7	10				
2018	3rd Italian Serie A	12	6				
2018	Mediterranean Games	1st place, gold medalist(s)	1st place, gold medalist(s)		7	8	1st place, gold medalist(s)
2018	Italian Championships						1st place, gold medalist(s)
2018	Rüsselsheim Friendly	2nd place, silver medalist(s)	4				
2018	World Championships		22				R3
2018	Cottbus World Cup						4
2018	Joaquin Blume Memorial		4				
2019	1st Italian Serie A	3rd place, bronze medalist(s)	2nd place, silver medalist(s)				
2019	Baku World Cup						2nd place, silver medalist(s)
2019	Doha World Cup						2nd place, silver medalist(s)
2019	2nd Italian Serie A	4	1st place, gold medalist(s)				
2019	3rd Italian Serie A	8	3rd place, bronze medalist(s)				
2019	Universiade	3rd place, bronze medalist(s)	5			2nd place, silver medalist(s)	
2019	Italian Championships					7	2nd place, silver medalist(s)
2019	Cottbus World Cup						3rd place, bronze medalist(s)
2020	1st Italian Serie A	3rd place, bronze medalist(s)	4				
2020	Melbourne World Cup						3rd place, bronze medalist(s)
2020	Baku World Cup						(Note: Mori qualified to the FX final in first place; however event finals were cancelled due to the COVID-19 pandemic in Azerbaijan)
2020	3rd Italian Serie A	4	2nd place, silver medalist(s)				
2021	1st Italian Serie A	3rd place, bronze medalist(s)					
2021	2nd Italian Serie A	2nd place, silver medalist(s)	9				
2021	3rd Italian Serie A	9					
2021	Doha World Cup						2nd place, silver medalist(s)
2021	Olympic Games					62	19
