= Megan Ryan =

Irish artistic gymnast

- Nicknames: Meg, Mugsy
- Born: 3 April 2002 (age 24) Cork, Ireland

Gymnastics career
- Discipline: Women's artistic gymnastics
- Country represented: (Republic of Ireland) Ireland
- Club: Douglas Gymnastics Club
- Head coach: Emma Hamill
Medal record
Representing Ireland
FIG World Cup
| Event | 1st | 2nd | 3rd |
|---|---|---|---|
| World Challenge Cup | 0 | 1 | 0 |

Megan "Meg" Ryan (born 3 April 2002) is an Irish artistic gymnast who competed at the 2020 Olympic Games. She was the first Irish female gymnast to win a medal on the FIG World Cup series.

== Early life ==
Ryan was born on 3 April 2002 in Cork. She began gymnastics at age five after watching her older sister Hayley train. She also played Gaelic football before she decided to concentrate on gymnastics.

== Gymnastics career ==
=== Junior ===
Ryan won the gold medal on every event at the 2016 Irish Championships, except for the uneven bars where she won the silver medal. She made her international debut at the European Championships where she finished 53rd in the all-around during the qualification round. In 2017, Ryan once again won the junior all-around at the Irish Championships. Then at the FIT Challenge, she finished seventh with the junior Irish team. She then competed at the European Youth Summer Olympic Festival and was chosen to be Ireland's flag bearer in the opening ceremony. The team of Ryan, Jane Heffernan, and Emma Slevin finished 18th in the team competition. At the Northern European Championships, she finished 12th in the all-around final and fifth in the vault final.

=== Senior ===
Ryan became age-eligible for senior competition in 2018. However, she missed the entire 2018 season after having surgery to remove an extra bone in her ankle.

Ryan competed at the 2019 European Championships where she finished 49th in the all-around during the qualification round. She then won the gold medal in the all-around at the senior Irish Championships. She only competed on the balance beam at the Irish Super Championships, and she won the gold medal. At the Mersin World Challenge Cup, she won the silver medal on the uneven bars behind Nazli Savranbasi. This was Ireland's first medal at the women's FIG World Cup. She then competed at the 2019 World Championships where she finished 95th in the all-around in the qualification round. Due to this result, she was initially the first reserve for the Olympic Games. However, after North Korea withdrew from the Olympics, Ryan received the spot that initially went to Kim Su-jong.

At the 2021 European Championships, Ryan decided to only compete on the uneven bars, balance beam, and floor exercise in order to build up towards the Olympic Games. She did not qualify for any of the event finals. At the Olympic Games, Ryan finished 72nd in the all-around during the qualification round with a total score of 47.199.

== Awards ==
Ryan received the Echo Women in Sport Award in 2019. Gymnastics Ireland gave her the Rising Star award in 2017.

== Personal life ==
Ryan studies pharmacy at University College Cork.

== Competitive history ==
Competitive history of Megan Ryan at the junior level
| Year | Event | Team | AA | VT | UB | BB | FX |
|---|---|---|---|---|---|---|---|
| 2016 | Irish Championships | | 1st place, gold medalist(s) | 1st place, gold medalist(s) | 2nd place, silver medalist(s) | 1st place, gold medalist(s) | 1st place, gold medalist(s) |
| 2016 | Junior European Championships | | 53 | | | | |
| 2017 | Irish Championships | | 1st place, gold medalist(s) | | | | |
| 2017 | FIT Challenge | 7 | 34 | | | | |
| 2017 | European Youth Olympic Festival | 18 | | | | | |
| 2017 | Northern European Championships | 7 | 12 | 5 | | | |

Competitive history of Megan Ryan at the senior level
| Year | Event | Team | AA | VT | UB | BB | FX |
2019
| 2019 | European Championships | | 49 | | | | |
| 2019 | Irish Championships | | 1st place, gold medalist(s) | | | | |
| 2019 | Irish Super Championships | | | | | 1st place, gold medalist(s) | |
| 2019 | Mersin World Challenge Cup | | | 8 | 2nd place, silver medalist(s) | | |
| 2019 | World Championships | | 95 | | | | |
2021
| 2021 | Olympic Games | | 72 | | | | |
