= Vladislav Polyashov =

Russian artistic gymnast

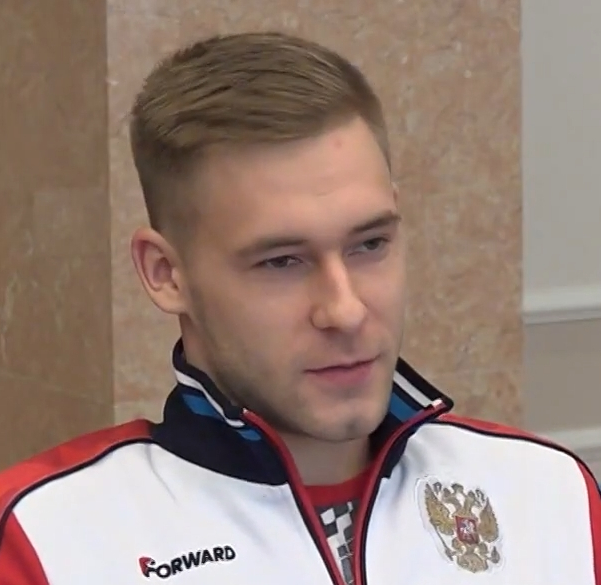
- Polyashov in October 2019

Personal information
- Full name: Vladislav Sergeyevich Polyashov
- Born: 4 April 1995 (age 31) Cheboksary, Russia

Gymnastics career
- Discipline: Men's artistic gymnastics
- Country represented: Russia; (2012–present)
- Club: Cheboksary Sports School of Olympic Reserve No.6: Russia
- Head coaches: Anatoly Vasilyev, Irina Rudyanu
Medal record
Men's artistic gymnastics
Representing Russia
World Championships
Gold medal – first place	2019 Stuttgart	Team
Silver medal – second place	2018 Doha	Team
European Games
Bronze medal – third place	2019 Minsk	All-around
European Championships
Bronze medal – third place	2019 Szczecin	Pommel horse
Summer Universiade
Silver medal – second place	2017 Taipei	Horizontal bar
Bronze medal – third place	2017 Taipei	Team
FIG World Cup
Event / 1st / 2nd / 3rd; Apparatus World Cup / 2 / 2 / 1

Vladislav Sergeyevich Polyashov (alt. spelling: Poliashov; Russian: Владислав Сергеевич Поляшов; born 4 April 1995) is a Russian artistic gymnast. He is a 2019 World champion and 2018 World silver medalist in the team competition. Individually, he is the 2019 European Games all-around bronze medalist and the 2019 European Championships pommel horse bronze medalist. He competed at the 2020 Summer Olympics.

== Gymnastics career ==
Polyashov began gymnastics when he was five years old. He won a silver medal with the Russian team at the 2012 Junior European Championships.

Polyashov was an alternate for the 2016 Summer Olympics team. At the 2017 Summer Universiade, Polyashov won a team bronze and a horizontal bar silver.

Polyashov won the all-around bronze medal at the 2018 Russian Championships. At the 2018 World Championships in Doha, Qatar, he was the alternate on the Russian team that won the silver medal. He won the silver medal in the all-around at the 2019 Russian Championships.

Polyashov won a gold medal on the parallel bars at the 2019 Baku World Cup– the first FIG World Cup medal of his career. Then at the Doha World Cup, he won the silver medal behind the reigning World champion, Zou Jingyuan. At the 2019 European Championships, he won a bronze medal on the pommel horse behind Max Whitlock and Cyril Tommasone. He then represented Russia at the 2019 European Games and won the all-around bronze medal behind teammate David Belyavskiy and Ukraine's Oleg Verniaiev. He was the alternate for the Russian team that won the gold medal at the 2019 World Championships. After the World Championships, he competed at the Cottbus World Cup and won the parallel bars bronze medal.

At the 2020 Melbourne World Cup, Polyashov won a gold medal on the parallel bars. He finished second in the parallel bars qualifications at the Baku World Cup, but the finals were canceled due to the start of the COVID-19 pandemic.

Polyashov won the parallel bars title at the 2021 Russian Championships. He was selected for one of the Russian Olympic Committee's individual spots at the 2020 Summer Olympics. He competed on the pommel horse and the parallel bars but did not advance beyond the qualification round.

In 2022, the International Gymnastics Federation (FIG) banned Russian athletes from international competition. At the 2024 BRICS Games, he won a gold medal on the pommel horse, and he won a silver medal on the parallel bars to teammate Daniel Marinov. Russian athletes were allowed to return to FIG competitions as Authorised Neutral Athletes given they met the neutrality criteria, and Polyashov's application was approved in 2025.

== Competitive history ==
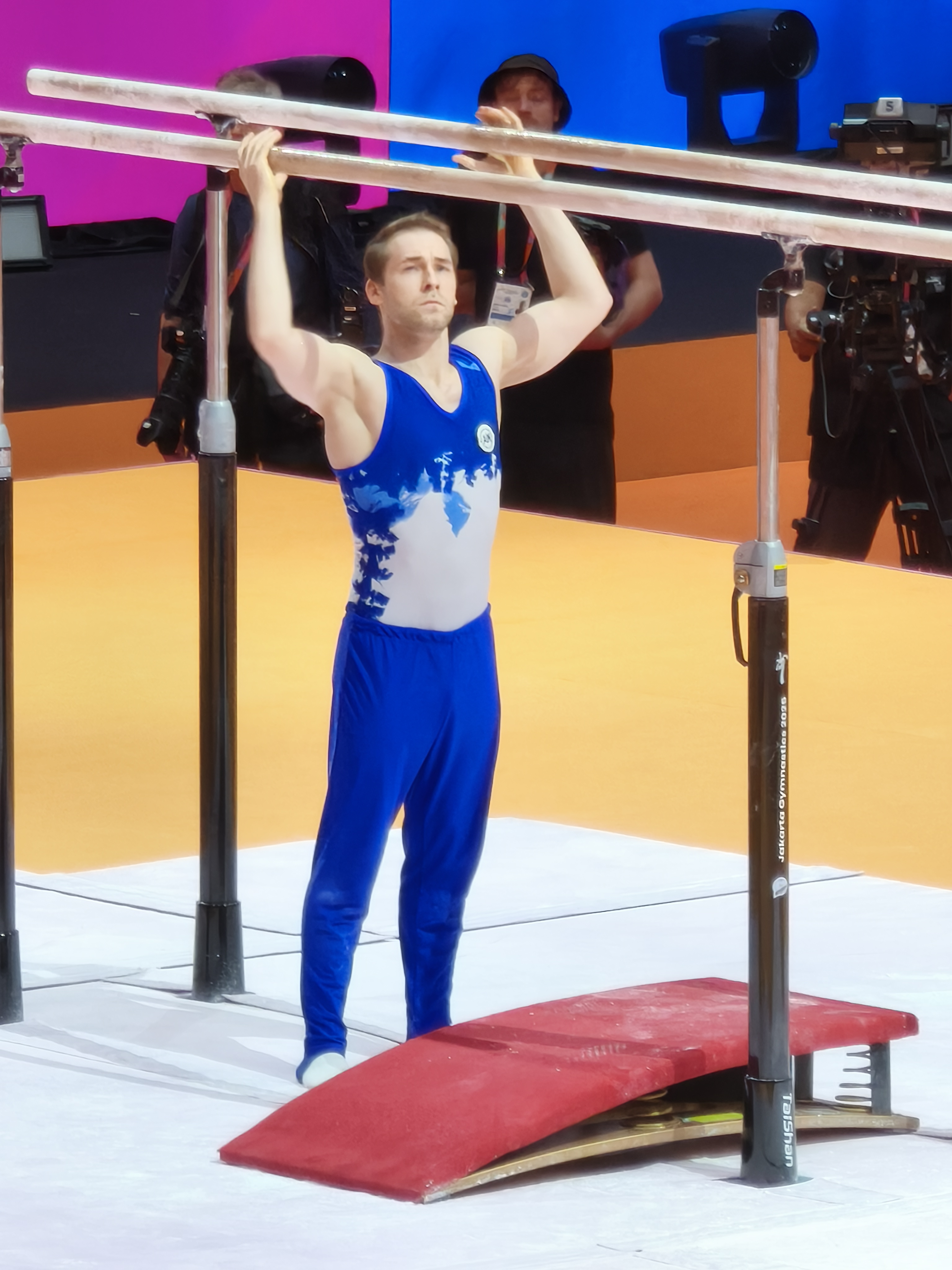
Polyashov at the 2025 World Championships

Competitive history of Vladislav Polyashov
Year	Event	Team	AA	FX	PH	SR	VT	PB	HB
2012
2012	Junior European Championships	2nd place, silver medalist(s)				7		6	
2014	Russian Championships		8		6			4	
2014	World Championships	5							
2015	Russian Championships	3rd place, bronze medalist(s)			7			7	5
2016	Russian Championships	1st place, gold medalist(s)		6				2nd place, silver medalist(s)	
2017	Russian Championships	4	3rd place, bronze medalist(s)	3rd place, bronze medalist(s)	4	7		2nd place, silver medalist(s)	3rd place, bronze medalist(s)
2017	Universiade	3rd place, bronze medalist(s)							2nd place, silver medalist(s)
2018	DTB Pokal Team Challenge	1st place, gold medalist(s)	30					1st place, gold medalist(s)	
2018	Russian Championships	2nd place, silver medalist(s)	3rd place, bronze medalist(s)	6	8			4	7
2018	Russian Cup		2nd place, silver medalist(s)	8	3rd place, bronze medalist(s)			5	5
2018	World Championships	2nd place, silver medalist(s)							
2019	Russian Championships		2nd place, silver medalist(s)		7			6	4
2019	Baku World Cup			32	20			1st place, gold medalist(s)	
2019	European Championships				3rd place, bronze medalist(s)			8	
2019	European Games		3rd place, bronze medalist(s)	14	19	13		2	10
2019	Russian Cup		5	7				6	5
2019	Cottbus World Cup				10			3rd place, bronze medalist(s)	
2020	Melbourne World Cup				6			1st place, gold medalist(s)	
2021	Russian Championships	2nd place, silver medalist(s)			6			1st place, gold medalist(s)	4
2021	Russian Cup				2nd place, silver medalist(s)				
2021	Olympic Games				14			15	
2021	World Championships				25			49	
2025
2025	World Championships							6	
