= Nazlı Savranbaşı =

Turkish artistic gymnast

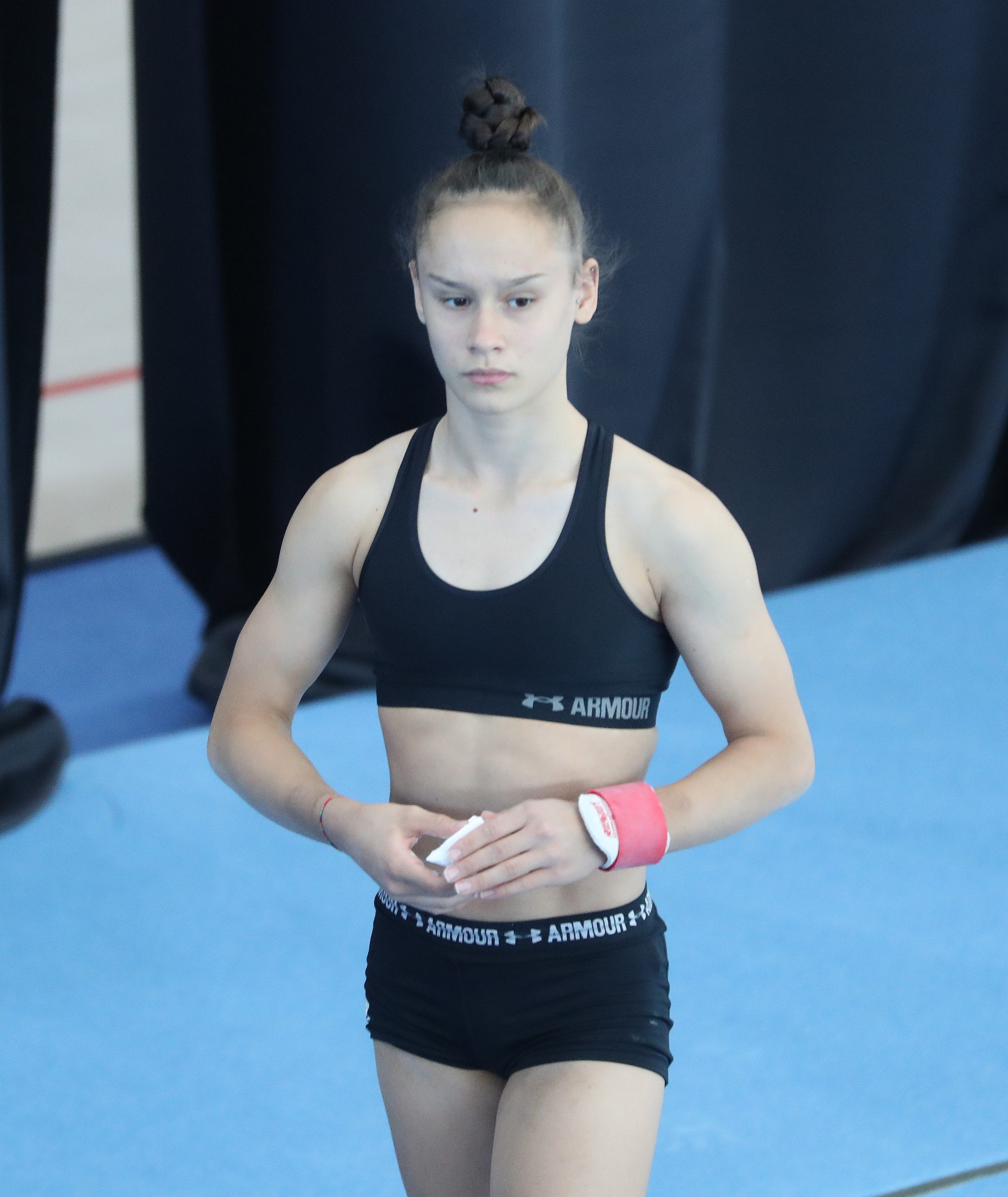
- Savranbaşı at the 2018 Summer Youth Olympics

Personal information
- Born: 9 October 2003 (age 22) Konak, İzmir, Turkey
- Height: 1.60 m (5 ft 3 in)

Gymnastics career
- Discipline: Women's artistic gymnastics
- Country represented: Turkey (2017 - present)
- Club: Şavkar Gymnastics Club
- Head coach: Özgür Gümüşlü
Medal record
Representing Turkey
Women's Artistic Gymnastics
FIG World Cup
Event	1st	2nd	3rd
World Challenge Cup	1	0	0

Nazlı Savranbaşı (born 9 October 2003) is a Turkish artistic gymnast. She represented Turkey at the 2020 Summer Olympics and at the 2018 Summer Youth Olympics. She is the 2019 Mersin World Challenge Cup champion on the uneven bars. She is the 2020 Turkish all-around champion and the 2018 Turkish junior all-around champion.

== Career ==
Savranbaşı began gymnastics when she was four years old.

=== Junior ===
Savranbaşı won the bronze medal in the junior all-around at the 2017 Turkish Championships. She then made her international debut at the Austrian Team Open where the Turkish team finished sixth, and Savranbaşı finished 17th in the all-around. Then at the FIT Challenge in Ghent, she helped the Turkish junior team finish eighth. She finished 19th with the Turkish team at the 2017 European Youth Summer Olympic Festival.

Savranbaşı won the gold medal in the all-around at the 2018 Turkish Championships. She then competed at the 2018 Gymnasiade where she finished 14th in the all-around, and she tied for fifth place in the vault final. She took bronze medals in the vault and uneven bars and the gold medal in the floor exercise at the 2018 Gym Festival Trnava in Slovakia. She then finished 11th at the Youth Olympic Qualifier and qualified Turkey a spot for the 2018 Summer Youth Olympics. The Turkish team finished 13th at the 2018 Junior European Championships, and Savranbaşı finished 22nd in the all-around. She competed at the 2018 Summer Youth Olympics in Buenos Aires, Argentina but did not advance to any finals. She finished 11th in the mixed multi-discipline team event.

=== Senior ===
Savranbaşı won the bronze medal in the all-around at her first senior Turkish Championships. She then competed at the 2019 Baku World Cup where she finished ninth in the floor exercise final. She competed at the 2019 European Championships but did not qualify for any finals. She began competing in the German Bundesliga for the Berkheim club. Berkheim finished second in League 2 at the 2nd Bundesliga event, and Savranbaşı won the all-around. She then competed at the Koper World Challenge Cup and finished seventh on the uneven bars. She was selected to represent Turkey at the 2019 European Games where she finished 26th in the all-around during the qualification round. She won the gold medal on the uneven bars at the Mersin World Challenge Cup. At the 2019 World Championships, she finished 61st in the all-around and qualified a spot for the 2020 Olympic Games. After the World Championships, she competed at the 3rd Bundesliga where Berkheim finished eighth, and Savranbaşı finished third in the all-around.

Savranbaşı won the gold medal in the all-around at the 2020 Turkish Championships. At the 2021 Turkish Championships, she only competed on the uneven bars where she won the bronze medal. She then competed at the 2021 European Championships but did not advance to any finals. She finished sixth on the uneven bars at the 2021 Osijek World Challenge Cup. She then competed at the postponed-2020 Summer Olympics, but she did not advance past the qualifying round.

Savranbaşı represented Turkey at the 2022 Mediterranean Games where the Turkish team finished fourth in the team final. She qualified for the uneven bars final where she finished eighth. She then competed at the 2022 European Championships where the Turkish team finished 20th.

== Competition history ==
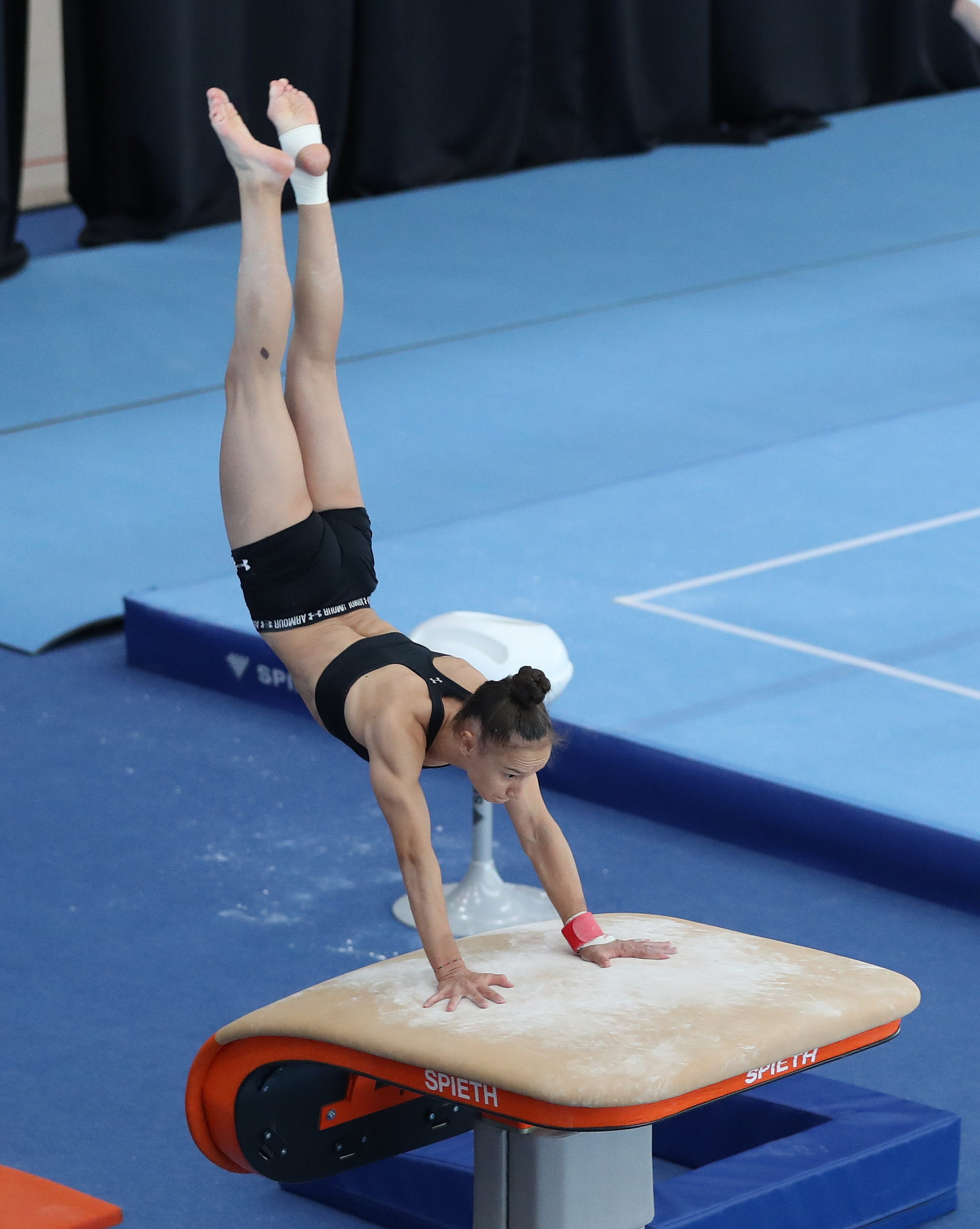
Savranbaşı training at the 2018 Summer Youth Olympics.

Year	Event	Team	AA	VT	UB	BB	FX
Junior
2017	Turkish Championships		3rd place, bronze medalist(s)	2nd place, silver medalist(s)	1st place, gold medalist(s)	7	3rd place, bronze medalist(s)
2017	Austrian Team Open	6	17				
2017	FIT Challenge	8					
2017	European Youth Olympic Festival	19					
2018	Turkish Championships		1st place, gold medalist(s)	1st place, gold medalist(s)	1st place, gold medalist(s)	7	5
2018	Gymnasiade	5	14	5			
2018	Gym Festival Trnava		4	3rd place, bronze medalist(s)	3rd place, bronze medalist(s)		1st place, gold medalist(s)
2018	Youth Olympic Games Qualifier		11				
2018	European Championships	13	22				
2018	Youth Olympic Games	11	31				
Senior
2019	Turkish Championships		3rd place, bronze medalist(s)	1st place, gold medalist(s)		8	5
2019	Baku World Cup						9
2019	2nd Bundesliga	2nd place, silver medalist(s)	1st place, gold medalist(s)				
2019	Koper World Challenge Cup				7		
2019	Mersin World Challenge Cup			5	1st place, gold medalist(s)		
2019	World Championships		61				
2019	3rd Bundesliga	8	3rd place, bronze medalist(s)				
2020	Turkish Championships		1st place, gold medalist(s)		3rd place, bronze medalist(s)	3rd place, bronze medalist(s)	2nd place, silver medalist(s)
2021	Turkish Championships				3rd place, bronze medalist(s)		
2021	Osijek World Challenge Cup				6		
2021	Olympic Games		71				
2022	Mediterranean Games	4			8		
2022	European Championships	20					
