= Urara Ashikawa =

Japanese artistic gymnast

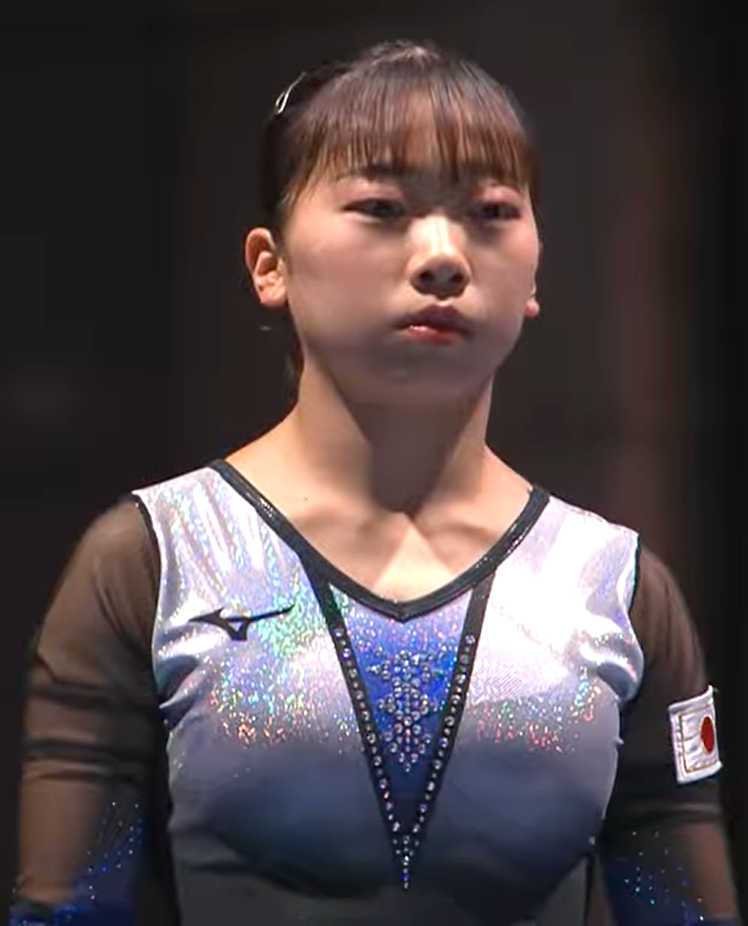
- Ashikawa at the 2025 World University Games

Personal information
- Born: March 8, 2003 (age 23) Fuji, Shizuoka, Japan

Gymnastics career
- Discipline: Women's artistic gymnastics
- Country represented: Japan; (2018–2025)
- Club: Mizutori Gymnasium
- Retired: November 17, 2025
Medal record
Representing Japan
World Championships
Gold medal – first place	2021 Kitakyushu	Balance beam
World University Games
Gold medal – first place	2025 Rhine-Ruhr	Team
Gold medal – first place	2025 Rhine-Ruhr	Balance beam
Event / 1st / 2nd / 3rd; FIG World Cup / 2 / 2 / 0
- Education: Nippon Sport Science University

Urara Ashikawa (芦川うらら, Ashikawa Urara; born March 8, 2003) is a Japanese former artistic gymnast who represented Japan at the 2020 Summer Olympics. She is the 2021 World Champion on the balance beam.

== Personal life ==
Ashikawa was born in Fuji, Shizuoka, Japan in 2003. She began gymnastics when she was a year old and began training at Mizutori Gymnasium when she was in second grade.

== Junior gymnastics career ==
=== 2016–17 ===
In 2016, Ashikawa competed at the All-Japan Event Championships where she placed third on balance beam behind Asuka Teramoto and Kiko Kuwajima. In 2018, she again competed at the All-Japan Event Championships and once again placed third on balance beam behind Teramoto and Natsumi Sasada.

=== 2018 ===
In 2018, Ashikawa represented Japan at the Asian Junior Championships alongside Haruka Ikeda, Hinata Matsubara, Shoko Miyata, and Ayumi Niiyama. They placed second in the team final behind China. Individually Ashikawa placed fifth in the all-around, seventh on uneven bars, and sixth on balance beam. At the All-Japan Event Championships, Ashikawa placed ninth on balance beam during qualifications and did not qualify to the event final. She ended the season competing at the World Cup trials where she placed second on balance beam behind Mana Oguchi.

== Senior gymnastics career ==
=== 2019 ===
Ashikawa turned senior in 2019. She made her senior international debut at the 2019 City of Jesolo Trophy where she placed 16th in the all-around and seventh on uneven bars and balance beam. At the All Japan Event Championships, she placed sixth on balance beam. In November, she made her World Cup debut at the Cottbus World Cup where she won gold on balance beam ahead of Ukrainian Diana Varinska.

=== 2020 ===
In February, Ashikawa competed at the Melbourne World Cup where she once again won gold on balance beam, this time ahead of first-year senior Ondine Achampong of Great Britain. She next competed at the Baku World Cup where she qualified to the balance beam final in first place; however, event finals were canceled due to the COVID-19 pandemic in Azerbaijan. The FIG later ruled that the results of qualification would be used for point distribution for Olympic qualification, meaning Ashikawa earned a perfect score of 90 and no other competitor could match her score on the balance beam.

=== 2021 ===
In June, Ashikawa was officially awarded an Olympic berth via the Apparatus World Cup series and competed at the 2020 Summer Olympics as an individual athlete. She was originally the first reserve for the balance beam final but was able to compete when Larisa Iordache withdrew. She finished sixth.

In October, Ashikawa competed at the 2021 World Championships in Kitakyushu. While there, she won gold on the balance beam. This was Japan's second world gold medal on the apparatus following Keiko Tanaka-Ikeda's win in 1954. Ashikawa became the third Japanese woman to win a world title in artistic gymnastics following Tanaka-Ikeda and Mai Murakami.

== Competitive history ==
Competitive history of Urara Ashikawa at the junior level
Year	Event	Team	AA	VT	UB	BB	FX
2016	All Japan Event Championships					3rd place, bronze medalist(s)	
2017	All Japan Event Championships					3rd place, bronze medalist(s)	
2018
2018	Asian Championships	2nd place, silver medalist(s)	5		7	6	
2018	All Japan Event Championships					R2	
2018	World Cup Trials					2nd place, silver medalist(s)	

Competitive history of Urara Ashikawa at the senior level
Year	Event	Team	AA	VT	UB	BB	FX
2019	City of Jesolo Trophy	4	16		7	7	
2019	All Japan Event Championships					6	
2019	Cottbus World Cup					1st place, gold medalist(s)	
2020	Melbourne World Cup					1st place, gold medalist(s)	
2020	Baku World Cup					1	
2021	All-Japan Championships		14			1st place, gold medalist(s)	
2021	NHK Trophy		11			2nd place, silver medalist(s)	
2021	Olympic Games					6	
2021	World Championships					1st place, gold medalist(s)	
2022	All-Japan Championships		7			1st place, gold medalist(s)	
2022	NKH Trophy		14				
2023	Cottbus World Cup					2nd place, silver medalist(s)	
2023	World Championships	8				5	
2024	Cottbus World Cup					2nd place, silver medalist(s)	
2025	NKH Trophy		15			1st place, gold medalist(s)	
2025	World University Games	1st place, gold medalist(s)				1st place, gold medalist(s)	
