= Weng Hao =

Chinese artistic gymnast

- 翁浩
- Nickname: King of Pommel Horse
- Born: 21 March 1998 (age 28)

Gymnastics career
- Country represented: China
- Club: Jiangsu Province
Medal record
Representing China
World Championships
Silver medal – second place	2021 Kitakyushu	Pommel Horse
National Games
Gold medal – first place	2017 Tianjin	Pommel Horse
Gold medal – first place	2021 Shaanxi	Team
Gold medal – first place	2021 Shaanxi	Pommel Horse
Silver medal – second place	2017 Tianjin	Team
FIG World Cup
Event	1st	2nd	3rd
FIG World Cup	5	2	1
Total	5	2	1

Weng Hao (Chinese: 翁浩; pinyin: Wēng Hào; born 21 March 1998) is a Chinese artistic gymnast. He competed in the 2017 World Artistic Gymnastics Championships in Montreal, Canada, placing 6th in the pommel horse event finals. Over the course of the 2016, 2017, 2018, 2019, and 2020 FIG World Cups he won 5 gold medals in pommel horse: three in Baku and one in Anadia and Cottbus each. At the 2021 World Artistic Gymnastics Championships he qualified for the pommel horse event final and placed second in the final in a tie with Kazuma Kaya.

== Competitive history ==
Year	Event	Team	AA	FX	PH	SR	VT	PB	HB
2016	World Cup Anadia				1st place, gold medalist(s)				
2016	National Championships	3rd place, bronze medalist(s)			1st place, gold medalist(s)				
2017	World Cup Melbourne				3rd place, bronze medalist(s)				
2017	World Cup Baku				1st place, gold medalist(s)				
2017	National Championships	1st place, gold medalist(s)							
2017	World Championships				6				
2017	National Games	2nd place, silver medalist(s)			1st place, gold medalist(s)				
2018	World Cup Baku				1st place, gold medalist(s)				
2018	World Cup Cottbus				2nd place, silver medalist(s)				
2018	National Championships	1st place, gold medalist(s)			1st place, gold medalist(s)				
2019	World Cup Melbourne				2nd place, silver medalist(s)				
2019	World Cup Cottbus				1st place, gold medalist(s)				
2019	National Championships	2nd place, silver medalist(s)			1st place, gold medalist(s)				
2020	World Cup Baku				1st place, gold medalist(s)				
2020	National Championships	1st place, gold medalist(s)							
2021
2021	National Championships	1st place, gold medalist(s)			1st place, gold medalist(s)				
2021	National Games	1st place, gold medalist(s)			1st place, gold medalist(s)				
2021	World Championships				2nd place, silver medalist(s)				
