= Hidenobu Yonekura =

Japanese artistic gymnast

- Nicknames: Hide, Hidepu
- Born: 1 May 1997 (age 29)

Gymnastics career
- Discipline: Men's artistic gymnastics
- Country represented: Japan
- Club: Tokushukai Gymnastics Club
- Head coaches: Isao Yoneda [club], Hisashi Mizutori [national]
Medal record
Men's artistic gymnastics
Representing Japan
World Championships
Silver medal – second place	2021 Kitakyushu	Vault
FIG World Cup
Event	1st	2nd	3rd
World Championships	0	1	0
World Challenge Cup	2	0	0
Total	2	1	0

Hidenobu Yonekura (born 1 May 1997) is a Japanese artistic gymnast. He is the 2021 World Artistic Gymnastics Championships silver medalist in Vault. His first international success was at the 2019 World Cup where he won gold in the vault event in Szombathely. In the 2019 World Cup he won another gold in vault at Doha.

== Competitive history ==
Year	Event	Team	AA	FX	PH	SR	VT	PB	HB
2019	World Cup Szombathely						1st place, gold medalist(s)		
2021
2021	World Cup Doha						1st place, gold medalist(s)		
2021	World Championships						2nd place, silver medalist(s)		

Apparatus	Name(s)	Description(s)	Difficulty	Competition Achieved
Vault	The Yonekura	Kasamatsu straight with 5/2 (2½) turn, or Tsukahara straight with 7/2 (3½) turn	6.0	2019 FIG Artistic Gymnastics World Cup series in Melbourne
