= Andrey Medvedev (gymnast) =

Israeli gymnast

- אנדריי מדבדב
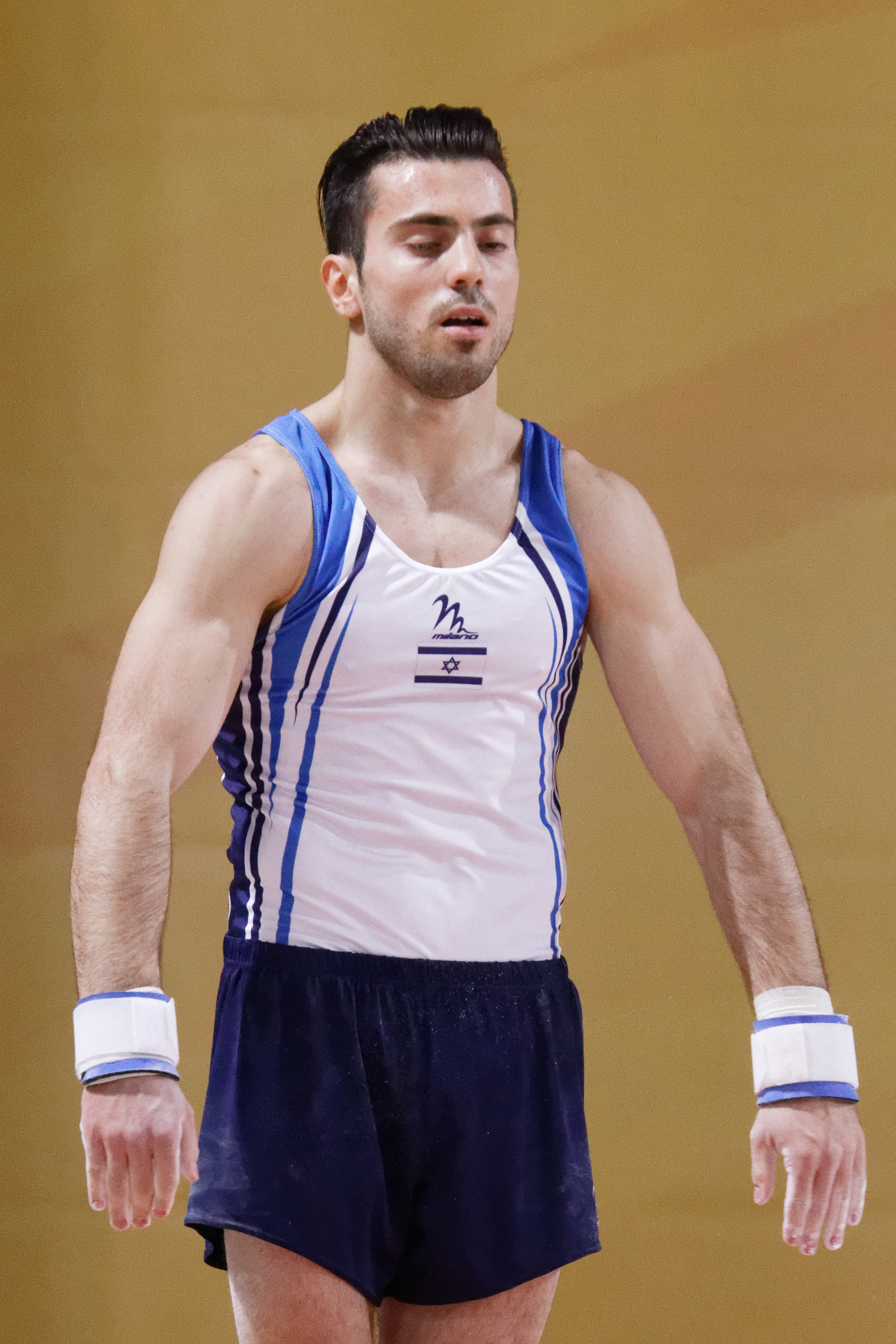
- Medvedev at the 2015 European Championships

Personal information
- Born: April 6, 1990 (age 36) Ulyanovsk, Soviet Russia, USSR

Gymnastics career
- Discipline: Men's artistic gymnastics
- Country represented: Israel
- Club: Maccabi Tel Aviv
- Head coach: Sergey Vaisburg
Medal record
Representing Israel
World Championships
Bronze medal – third place	2021 Kitakyushu	Vault
European Championships
Silver medal – second place	2019 Szczecin	Vault
Silver medal – second place	2021 Basel	Vault
Maccabiah Games
Gold medal – first place	2017 Tel Aviv	Vault
Gold medal – first place	2017 Tel Aviv	Rings
Silver medal – second place	2017 Tel Aviv	Floor Exercise

Andrey Medvedev (Hebrew: אנדריי מדבדב, Russian: Андрей Медведев; born April 6, 1990) is a USSR-born Israeli artistic gymnast. He won the bronze medal at the 2021 World Artistic Gymnastics Championships in Vault and two silver medals in Vault at the 2019 and the 2021 European Championships.

== Early life ==
Medvedev was born in Soviet Union in 1990. He grew up in the city of Ulyanovsk. Enrolled in gymnastics at the age of 6. When he was 12 years old, Medvedev immigrated with his family to Israel. Then resided in Haifa, Israel, and in 2013 moved to Tel Aviv, Israel, to join the local club of Maccabi Tel Aviv.

== Career ==
In April 2014, Medvedev won his first medal in a world tour competition when he won a silver medal in vault at the 'Ljubljana World Cup' with the score of 14.975. In May 2017, he won a gold medal at the 'Koper World Cup' after scoring 14.975 in vault. Later that year, he won a bronze medal at the 'Osijek World Cup'.

At the 2017 Maccabiah Games, he won three gold medals.

At the 2018 European Championships held in Glasgow, he finished 5th in vault after scoring 14.266. In May of that year, he won a gold medal in vault at the Osijek World Cup with the score of 14.667.

At the 2019 European Championships held in Szczecin, he won the silver medal in vault after scoring 14.699 in the final.

In 2021, he won a bronze medal in the men's vault at the Artistic Gymnastics World Championships.

At the 2022 Maccabiah Games, he was part of the Team Israel squad that won the gold medal in the open men's team.
