= List of people from Saint Petersburg =

Coat of Arms of Saint Petersburg

This is a list of notable people who have lived in Saint Petersburg, Russia (1914–1924: Petrograd, 1924–1991: Leningrad).

== Born in Saint Petersburg ==
=== 1701–1800 ===
- Peter II of Russia (1715–1730), emperor of Russia, 1727–1730
- Franz Moritz von Lacy (1725–1801), son of Count Peter von Lacy; Austrian field marshal
- Dmitri Alekseyevich Golitsyn (1728–1803), diplomat, art agent, writer, volcanologist and mineralogist
- Johann Euler (1734–1800), Swiss-Russian astronomer and mathematician
- John Julius Angerstein (1735–1823), London businessman and Lloyd's of London underwriter
- Ivan VI of Russia (1740–1764), emperor of Russia, 1740–1741
- Ivan Lepyokhin (1740–1802), naturalist, zoologist, botanist and explorer
- Mikhail Kutuzov (1745–1813), field marshal of the Russian Empire
- Nikolay Rumyantsev (1754–1826), Russia's foreign minister and chancellor of the Russian Empire
- Mikhail Miloradovich (1771–1825), Russian general of Serbian origin
- Thomas Tooke (1774 in Kronstadt – 1858), English economist
- Catharina of Württemberg (1783–1835), second wife of Jérôme Bonaparte; Queen consort of Westphalia, 1807–1813
- Joseph Bové (1784–1834), Russian neoclassical architect with Italian roots
- Paul von Krüdener (1784–1852), Russian diplomat; fourth Russian ambassador to the United States
- Michael Lunin (1787–1845), political philosopher, revolutionary, Freemason, Decembrist and a participant of the Franco-Russian Patriotic War of 1812
- Catherine Pavlovna of Russia (1788–1819), fourth daughter of emperor Paul I of Russia; Queen consort of Württemberg, 1816–1819
- Sylvester Shchedrin (1791–1830), landscape painter
- Grand Duchess Olga Pavlovna of Russia (1792–1795), Grand Duchess of Russia as the second-youngest daughter and seventh child of emperor Paul I of Russia
- Maria Danilova (1793–1810), ballet dancer
- Nikolay Muravyov-Karsky (1794–1866), Imperial Russian military officer and general of the Russian Army
- Konstantin Thon (1794–1881), official architect of Imperial Russia during the reign of Nicholas I
- Sergey Muravyov-Apostol (1796–1826), Russian Imperial lieutenant colonel; organizer of the Decembrist revolt
- Nicholas I of Russia (1796–1855), emperor of Russia, 1825–1855
- Wilhelm Küchelbecker (1797–1846), Romantic poet and Decembrist
- Fyodor Litke (1797–1882), navigator, geographer and Arctic explorer
- Karl Bryullov (1799–1852), painter
- Countess of Ségur (1799–1874), French writer of Russian birth

=== 1801–1830 ===
- Alexander Odoevsky (1802–1839), poet and playwright
- Alexis Guignard, comte de Saint-Priest (1805–1851), French diplomat, historian, and peer of France
- Alexander Andreyevich Ivanov (1806–1858), painter
- George Busk (1807–1886), British naval surgeon, zoologist and palaeontologist
- Nestor Kukolnik (1809–1868), playwright and prose writer of Carpatho-Rusyn origin
- Nikolay Muravyov-Amursky (1809–1881), statesman and diplomat
- Alexandre Remi (1809–1871), mayor-general, brother officer of Mikhail Lermontov
- Ivan Panaev (1812–1862), publisher of the magazine Sovremennik
- Anatoly Demidov (1813–1870), industrialist, diplomat and arts patron of the Demidov family
- Nikolay Ogarev (1813–1877), poet, historian and political activist
- Vladimir Sollogub (1813–1882), writer
- Alexander von Stieglitz (1814–1884), philanthropist and financier
- Eugene Balabin (1815–1895), Roman Catholic Jesuit priest
- Otto von Böhtlingk (1815–1904), German Indologist and Sanskrit scholar
- Alexander von Middendorff (1815–1894), zoologist and explorer
- Count Nikolay Adlerberg (1819–1892), Councilor of State, Chamberlain, governor of Taganrog, Simferopol and Finland
- Avdotya Panaeva (1820–1893), novelist, short-story writer, memoirist and literary-salon holder
- Alexander Serov (1820–1871), composer and music critic
- Mikhail Petrashevsky (1821–1866), thinker and public figure
- Boleslav Markevich (1822–1884), writer, essayist, journalist and literary critic
- Vladimir Stasov (1824–1906), critic
- Percy Smythe, 8th Viscount Strangford (1825–1869), British nobleman and man of letters
- Aleksey Uvarov (1825–1884), archaeologist
- Otto Pius Hippius (1826–1883), Baltic-German architect
- Pyotr Shuvalov (1827–1889), statesman and a counselor to emperor Alexander II
- Charles Sillem Lidderdale (1830–1895), British artist

=== 1831–1850 ===
- Mikhail Clodt (1832–1902), realistic painter
- Nikolay Pavlovich Ignatyev (1832–1908), statesman and diplomat
- Alexander Borodin (1833–1887), composer and chemist
- Viktor Hartmann (1834–1873), architect and painter
- Nikolai Pomyalovsky (1835–1863), writer
- Mitrofan Belyayev (1836–1904), Imperial Russian music publisher, philanthropist
- John Codman Ropes (1836–1899), American military historian and lawyer
- Mariia Surovshchikova-Petipa (1836–1886), prima ballerina; wife of ballet dancer and choreographer Marius Petipa and mother of ballerina Marie Petipa
- Anna Filosofova (1837–1912), feminist
- Franz Overbeck (1837–1905), German Protestant theologian
- Friedrich Konrad Beilstein (1838–1906), chemist
- Dmitry Chernov (1839–1921), metallurgist
- Ingeborg Bronsart von Schellendorf (1840–1913), Finnish-German composer
- Alexander W. von Götte (1840–1922), German zoologist
- Woldemar Kernig (1840–1917), internist and neurologist
- Princess Maria Maximilianovna of Leuchtenberg (1841–1914), daughter of Maximilian de Beauharnais, 3rd Duke of Leuchtenberg
- Nikolai Menshutkin (1842–1907), chemist
- Friedrich Heinrich Stöckhardt (1842–1920), architect
- Mikhail Skobelev (1843–1882), general; known for his conquest of Central Asia and heroism during the Russo-Turkish War
- Alexander III of Russia (1845–1894), emperor of Russia, 1881–1894
- Georg Cantor (1845–1918), German mathematician
- Bogomir Korsov (1845–1920), baritone opera singer
- Vladimir Lamsdorf (1845–1907), statesman, foreign minister of the Russian Empire, 1900–1906
- Ella Adayevskaya (1846–1926), pianist and composer
- Alexander von Bilderling (1846–1912), general in the Imperial Russian Army
- Anna Dostoevskaya (1846–1918), memoirist, stenographer, assistant; second wife of writer Fyodor Dostoyevsky
- Peter Carl Fabergé (1846–1920), jeweller
- Wladimir Köppen (1846–1940), German geographer, meteorologist, climatologist and botanist
- Rafail Levitsky (1847–1940), painter and professor
- Jean Béraud (1849–1935), French painter

=== 1851–1860 ===
- Walter W. Winans (1852–1920), American marksman, horse breeder, sculptor, and painter
- Nikolai Reitsenshtein (1854–1916), career naval officer in the Imperial Russian Navy
- Vladimir Golenishchev (1856–1947), Egyptologist
- Marie Petipa (1857–1930), ballerina; daughter of ballet dancer and choreographer Marius Petipa and prima ballerina Mariia Surovshchikova-Petipa
- Leopold Engel (1858–1931), writer and occultist
- Catherine Schneider (1856–1918), Baltic German saint
- Princess Maria Tenisheva (1858–1928), nobility, philanthropist and art collector
- Maria Blumenthal-Tamarina (1859–1938), actress
- Emanuel Nobel (1859–1932), Swedish-Russian oil baron
- Nikolai Essen (1860–1915), naval commander and admiral
- Victor Ewald (1860–1935), composer

=== 1861–1870 ===
- Lou Andreas-Salomé (1861–1937), psychoanalyst and writer
- Arvid Järnefelt (1861–1932), Finnish judge and writer
- Feodor Yulievich Levinson-Lessing (1861–1939), geologist
- Konstantin Fofanov (1862–1911), poet
- Fyodor Sologub (1863–1927), poet, novelist, translator, playwright and essayist
- Vladimir Vernadsky (1863–1945), one of the founders of geochemistry
- Alexander Glazunov (1865–1936), composer
- Dmitry Merezhkovsky (1866–1941), novelist, poet, religious thinker and literary critic
- Mikhail Eisenstein (1867–1921), architect and civil engineer of Baltic-German descent
- Nicholas II of Russia (1868–1918), emperor of Russia, 1894–1917
- Vasily Bartold (1869–1930), historian
- Nadezhda Krupskaya (1869–1939), revolutionary and wife of Vladimir Lenin
- Vera Karelina (1870–1931), labour activist and revolutionary
- Nikolay Pushnitsky (1870–1921), sailor

=== 1871–1880 ===
- Fyodor Dan (1871–1947), one of the founding leaders of Menshevism
- Olga Preobrajenska (1871–1962), ballerina of the Russian Imperial Ballet and a ballet instructor
- Alexandra Kollontai (1872–1952), revolutionary, writer and diplomat
- Mathilde Kschessinska (1872–1971), ballerina from a family of Polish origin
- George Washington Lambert (1873–1930), Australian artist
- Vladimir Fyodorov (1874–1966), scientist, weapons designer, professor, lieutenant general of a corps of military engineers
- Nicholas Roerich (1874–1947), painter and writer
- Noë Bloch (1875–1937), film producer
- Carl Enckell (1876–1959), Finnish politician, officer and diplomat
- Herman Gummerus (1877–1948), Finnish classical scholar and diplomat
- Lev Urusov (1877–1933), diplomat; member of the International Olympic Committee
- Pavel Pototsky (1879–1932), Polish engineer
- Agrippina Vaganova (1879–1951), Russian-Armenian ballet teacher; creator of the Vaganova method
- Peter P. von Weymarn (1879–1935), chemist
- Alexander Blok (1880–1921), lyrical poet
- Michel Fokine (1880–1942), choreographer and dancer

=== 1881–1890 ===
- Anna Pavlova (1881–1931), prima ballerina
- Mikhail Avilov (1882–1954), painter and art educator
- Igor Stravinsky (1882–1971), composer, pianist and conductor; born in a suburb of Saint Petersburg
- Viktor Bulla (1883–1938), photographer and cinema pioneer
- Rusudana Nikoladze (1884–1981), inorganic chemist and educator
- Leopold van der Pals (1884–1966), composer
- Stella Arbenina (1885–1976), Russian-born English actress
- Ivan Abramovich Zalkind (1885–1928), Soviet diplomat
- Sacha Guitry (1885–1957), French stage actor, film actor, director, screenwriter
- Naum Idelson (1885–1951), Soviet theoretical astronomer; expert in the history of physics and the history of mathematics
- Tamara Karsavina (1885–1978), prima ballerina
- Lydia Kyasht (1885–1959), Russian-British ballerina and dance teacher
- Nikolai Gumilev (1886–1921), poet
- Elsa Brändström (1888–1948), Swedish nurse and philanthropist
- Alexander Friedmann (1888–1925), mathematician and physicist
- Varvara Brilliant-Lerman (1888–1954), plant physiologist
- Ludmilla Schollar (1888–1978), Russian-American dancer and educator
- Serge Elisséeff (1889–1975), Russian-French scholar and professor
- Joseph Ruttenberg (1889–1983), Russian-American photojournalist and cinematographer
- Vladimir Rosing (1890–1963), opera singer and director; emigrated to England in 1913

=== 1891–1900 ===
- Boris Morros (1891–1963), worked at Paramount Pictures, where he produced films and supervised the music department
- Alexander Rodchenko (1891–1956), artist, sculptor, photographer, and graphic designer
- Aleksei Uversky (1891–1942), football player
- Erté (born Roman Petrovich Tyrtov, 1892–1990), fashion designer, costume designer, scenic designer, and illustrator
- Lydia Lopokova (1892–1981), ballerina
- Xenia Makletzova (1892–1974), ballerina
- Fyodor Raskolnikov (1892–1939), Bolshevik and Soviet diplomat
- Prince Paul of Yugoslavia (1893–1976), prince regent of Yugoslavia
- Robert Mertens (1894–1975), German herpetologist
- Vladimir Propp (1895–1970), folklorist and scholar
- Sasha Stone (1895–1940), photographer
- Vera Vinogradova (1895–1982), composer and pianist
- Mikhail Zoshchenko (1895–1958), satirist
- Felia Doubrovska (1896–1981), dancer and teacher
- Cleo Nordi (1898–1983), Russo-Finnish ballerina
- Vladimir Fock (1898–1974), physicist
- Maria Vega (1898–1980), poet, artist, and translator
- Pyotr Grigoryev (1899–1942), international footballer
- Vladimir Nabokov (1899–1977), writer
- Pyotr Pavlenko (1899–1951), writer
- Vera Fedorovna Gaze (1899–1954), astronomer
- Eugène Vinaver (1899–1979), literary scholar
- Nina Anisimova (1900–1979), ballerina and choreographer
- Nina Gagen-Torn (1900–1986), poet, historian, and ethnographer
- Léon Motchane (1900–1990), French industrialist and mathematician

=== 1901–1910 ===
- Andrews Engelmann (1901–1992), Russian-born German actor
- Waldemar Gurian (1902–1954), German-American political scientist, writer, and professor at the University of Notre Dame
- Véra Nabokov (1902–1991), wife, editor and translator of Russian writer Vladimir Nabokov
- Alexandra Danilova (1903–1997), Russian-born American prima ballerina
- Yevgeny Mravinsky (1903–1988), conductor
- George Balanchine (1904–1983), Russian-American choreographer
- Colonel-General Nikolai Berzarin (1904–1945), appointed Soviet military commandant of Berlin in 1945; the Bersarinplatz in Berlin Friedrichshain was named in his honour
- Tom Conway (1904–1967), British film, television and radio actor
- Daniel Prenn (1904–1991), Russian-born German, Polish, and British world-top-ten tennis player
- Tamara Talbot Rice (1904–1993), Russian-born English art historian
- Mischa Auer (1905–1967), actor
- Alexey Eisner (1905–1984), poet, translator and writer
- Natalia Gippius (1905–1994), artist
- Oleg Kerensky (1905–1984), civil engineer
- Daniil Kharms (1905–1942), writer and poet
- Ayn Rand (1905–1982), Russian-American novelist and philosopher
- Andria Balanchivadze (1906–1992), Georgian composer
- Dmitry Likhachev (1906–1999), philologist
- Illaria Obidenna Ladré (1906–1998), ballet dancer
- Dmitri Shostakovich (1906–1975), composer and pianist
- Evgenia Baykova (1907–1997), painter and graphic artist
- Vera Broido (1907–2004), writer
- Olga Sapphire (1907–1981), Russian-Japanese ballerina and choreographer (real name: Olga Ivanovna Pavlova, Russian: Ольга Ивановна Павлова)
- Sofka Skipwith (1907–1994), Russian émigrée to England; became a well-known Communist after working for Laurence Olivier and being interned by the Nazis in France in World War II
- Vasily Solovyov-Sedoy (1907–1979), composer
- Edmund Kurtz (1908–2004), cellist and music editor
- Ilya Frank (1908–1990), physicist
- Rostislaw Kaischew (1908–2002), Bulgarian physicochemist
- Alexandre Mnouchkine (1908–1993), French film producer
- Marina Semyonova (1908–2010), first Soviet-trained prima ballerina and 1975's People's Artist of the USSR
- Sergey Urusevsky (1908–1974), cinematographer and film director
- Boris Vildé (1908–1942), linguist and ethnographer
- Nina Anisimova (1909–1979), dancer and choreographer
- Anatole de Grunwald (1910–1967), Russian-British film producer and screenwriter
- Barys Kit (1910–2018), rocket scientist
- Nina Tikhonova (1910–1995), ballet dancer and teacher
- Galina Ulanova (1910–1998), ballet dancer

=== 1911–1920 ===
- Yrjö von Grönhagen (1911–2003), Finnish nobleman and anthropologist
- Igor Karassik (1911–1995), Russian-American engineer; known for his pioneering work with pumps
- Nikolay Novotelnov (1911–2006), chess International Master and writer
- David Shoenberg (1911–2004), British physicist
- Lev Gumilev (1912–1992), historian, ethnologist, anthropologist and translator
- Leonid Kantorovich (1912–1986), economist
- Varvara P. Mey (1912–1995), prima ballerina, ballet teacher and writer
- Assia Noris (1912–1998), Russian-Italian film actress
- Irina Nijinska (1913–1991), Russian-Polish ballet dancer
- Adrian von Fölkersam (1914–1945), German Waffen-SS officer in World War II
- Valentina Khetagurova (1914–1992), founder of the Khetagurovite Campaign
- Elena Shtaerman (1914–1991), scholar of Roman history; recipient of the State Prize of the USSR
- Dmitry Maevsky (1917–1992), painter; member of the Leningrad Union of Artists; regarded as one of representatives of the Leningrad School of Painting
- Anna Marly (1917–2006), singer-songwriter
- Efim Etkind (1918–1999), philologist and translation theorist
- Nathalie Krassovska (1918–2005), prima ballerina and teacher of classical ballet
- Irina Baronova (1919–2008), ballerina and actress
- Galina Ustvolskaya (1919–2006), composer of classical music
- Tatiana Semenova (1920–1996), Russian-American ballet dancer, dance teacher; founded the Houston Ballet Academy

=== 1921–1950 ===
- Aris Alexandrou (1922–1978), Greek novelist, poet and translator
- Juri Lotman (1922–1993), literary scholar, semiotician and cultural historian
- Boris Ugarov (1922–1991), realist painter and art educator
- Ekaterina Mikhailova-Demina (1925–2019), Hero of the Soviet Union
- Galina Vishnevskaya (1926–2012), soprano opera singer
- Igor Dmitriev (1927–2008), actor
- Vladimir Kondrashin (1929–1999), basketball coach
- Ninel Kurgapkina (1929–2009), prima ballerina and dance teacher
- Yuli Vorontsov (1929–2007), diplomat
- Boris Parygin (1930–2012), philosopher, sociologist and social psychologist
- Georgy Grechko (1931–2017), cosmonaut
- Viktor Korchnoi (1931–2016), chess player
- Alla Osipenko (1931–2025), ballerina
- Evgeny Ukhnalev (1931–2015), artist
- Mark Ermler (1932–2002), conductor
- Georgy Kovenchuk (1933–2015), artist and writer
- Boris Strugatsky (1933–2012), science-fiction writer
- Ilya Averbakh (1934–1986), film director
- Evegeny Bachurin (1934–2015), poet and composer
- Ludvig Faddeev (1934–2017), mathematician
- Oleg Golovanov (1934–2019), rower
- Tatiana Samoylova (1934–2014), actress
- Nina Timofeeva (1935–2014), ballet dancer
- Yuri Schmidt (1937–2013), human-rights lawyer
- Boris Spassky (1937–2025), chess grandmaster; the tenth World Chess Champion (1969–1972)
- Vitaly Efimov (born 1938), theoretical physicist
- Boris Melnikov (1938–2022), fencer; won a gold medal in the team sabre event at the 1964 Summer Olympics
- Alexander Ney (born 1939), artist
- Joseph Brodsky (1940–1996), Russian-American poet and essayist; 1987 Nobel Prize in Literature laureate
- Irina Gubanova (1940–2000), ballerina and film actress
- Natalia Makarova (born 1940), prima ballerina and choreographer
- Leon Petrosyan (born 1940), mathematician
- Eduard Vinokurov (1942–2010), Olympic and world-champion fencer
- Yakov Eliashberg (born 1946), mathematician
- Andrej Hoteev (1946–2021), pianist
- Tatyana Chernigovskaya (born 1947), neuroscientist, psycholinguist and theory of mind scientist
- Aleksandr Sokolov (born 1949), politician
- Viktor Novozhilov (1950–1991), wrestler

=== 1951–1960 ===
- Alexander Belov (1951–1978), basketball player
- Vladimir Kishkun (born 1951), athlete
- Ilya Klebanov (born 1951), politician
- Dmitry Stukalov (born 1951), hurdler
- Alexei Uchitel (born 1951), film director
- Vitali Baganov (born 1952), actor of film and television
- Vladimir Putin (born 1952), politician; president of the Russian Federation (2000–2008, since 7 May 2012)
- Tatiana Mishina (born 1954), figure-skating coach and former competitor
- Evgenij Kozlov (born 1955), artist
- Alexander Radvilovich (born 1955), composer, pianist and teacher
- Alexander Dityatin (1957–2025), artistic gymnast; Honoured Master of Sports of the USSR
- Sergei Krikalev (born 1958), cosmonaut

=== 1961–1970 ===
- Igor Butman (born 1961), jazz saxophonist
- Yevgeny Prigozhin (1961–2023), oligarch; former leader of the Wagner Group
- Valeri Broshin (1962–2009), professional football player and manager
- Oleg Makarov (born 1962), pair skater
- Viktor Tsoi (1962–1990), musician
- Alexey Parygin (born 1964), artist and art historian
- Peter Chernobrivets (born 1965), composer and musicologist
- Dmitry Medvedev (born 1965), politician; tenth prime minister of Russia (2012–2020); third president of Russia (2008–2012)
- Alexander Khalifman (born 1966), chessmaster; 1999 FIDE World Chess Champion
- Grigori Perelman (born 1966), mathematician
- Vitaly Pushnitsky (born 1967), artist
- Yulia Makhalina (born 1968), ballet dancer
- Larissa Lezhnina (born 1969), ballerina; principal dancer with the Dutch National Ballet in Amsterdam
- Anna Podlesnaya (born 1970), ballerina
- Ekaterina Shchelkanova (born 1970), ballerina, singer and actress

=== 1971–1980 ===
- Arcadi Volodos (born 1972), pianist
- Victoria Haralabidou (born 1971), Greek-Russian actress
- Lenn Kudrjawizki (born 1975), German actor
- Konstantin Khabensky (born 1972), actor
- Vladimir Volodenkov (born 1972), Olympic rower
- Alexei Urmanov (born 1973), figure skater
- Nikolai Valuev (born 1973), professional boxer
- Vitaly Milonov (born 1974), politician
- Kseniya Rappoport (born 1974), actress
- Konstantin Sakaev (born 1974), chess player
- Andrejs Mamikins (born 1976), Latvian politician and journalist; member of the European Parliament
- Vasily Petrenko (born 1976), conductor
- Anastasia Volochkova (born 1976), prima ballerina
- Diana Vishneva (born 1976), principal ballerina with the Kirov/Mariinsky Ballet
- Roman Savushkin(born 1977), professor
- Yevgeniya Isakova (born 1978), hurdler
- Marina Kislova (born 1978), sprinter
- Veronika Part (born 1978), ballet dancer
- Ivan Urgant (born 1978), television personality, showman, actor and musician
- Vyacheslav Malafeev (born 1979), footballer
- Svetlana Pospelova (born 1979), European indoor 400-metre champion
- Svetlana Abrosimova (born 1980), European champion basketball player
- Irina Golub (born 1980), ballerina
- Vladimir Karpets (born 1980), road bicycle racer
- Ilona Korstin (born 1980), basketball forward
- Yevgeniya Kuznetsova (born 1980), Olympic gymnast; based in Sofia, Bulgaria
- Margarita Levieva (born 1980), Russian-American actress
- Alexei Manziola (born 1980), swimmer
- Yevgeny Sudbin (born 1980), concert pianist
- Alexei Yagudin (born 1980), figure skater; born in Saint Petersburg, lived in the United States from 1998, but moved back to Saint Petersburg in 2006

=== 1981–1990 ===
- Natalya Antyukh (born 1981), athlete
- Andrey Arshavin (born 1981), footballer, Arsenal FC
- Anatoli Bogdanov (born 1981), professional footballer
- Olga Dmitrieva (born 1981), professional triathlete
- Mikhail Elgin (born 1981), professional tennis player
- Andrei Ivanov (born 1981), professional ice-hockey winger
- Kirill Safronov (born 1981), professional ice-hockey defenceman
- Kseniya Sobchak (born 1981), member of political opposition
- Georgy Grebenkov (born 1982), artistic gymnast
- Ilya Gringolts (born 1982), violinist and educator
- Sergei Slavnov (born 1982), pair skater
- Anastasia Fomina (born 1983), basketball point guard
- Konstantin Menshov (born 1983), figure skater
- Julia Novikova (born 1983), coloratura-soprano opera singer
- Pavel Durov (born 1984), entrepreneur
- Svetlana Bolshakova (born 1984), triple jumper
- Igor Denisov (born 1984), association footballer
- Daniil Konstantinov (born 1984), opposition politician, lawyer, human-rights activist
- Evgenia Obraztsova (born 1984), ballerina
- Anastasia Stashkevich (born 1984), ballerina; principal dancer with the Bolshoi Ballet
- Dmitry Borovikov (born 1984), Neo-Nazi pagan
- Maxim Martsinkevich (born 1984), Neo-Nazi activist
- Xenia Dyakonova (born 1985), poet, translator, literary critic, and teacher of writing
- Mikhail Ignatiev (born 1985), professional track-and-road bicycle racer
- Aleksandra Kiryashova (born 1985), pole vaulter
- Svetlana Kuznetsova (born 1985), tennis player
- Maria Mukhortova (born 1985), pair skater
- Oxxxymiron (born Miron Fyodorov 1985), rapper
- Nadezhda Skardino (born 1985), Belarusian biathlete
- Alina Somova (born 1985), ballerina; principal dancer with the Mariinsky Ballet
- Vladimir Suleimanov (born 1985), former professional footballer
- Andrey Timofeev (born 1985), musician
- Ekaterina Yurlova (born 1985), biathlete
- Natalia Ziganshina (born 1985), former gymnast
- Evgeniya Belyakova (born 1986), professional basketball player
- Vadim Bogdanov (born 1986), handball player
- Olga Esina (born 1986), ballerina; first solo dancer at the Vienna State Ballet
- Timofey Mozgov (born 1986), professional basketball player
- Anna Nazarova (born 1986), track-and-field athlete
- Oksana Akinshina (born 1987), actress
- Vladimir Garin (1987–2003), actor
- Roman Ovchinnikov (born 1987), former footballer
- Natalia Shliakhtenko (born 1987), professional triathlete
- Aleksei Shvalev (born 1987), professional ice-hockey player
- Sofya Skya (born 1987), actress, ballet dancer, and acting coach
- Kinuski Kakku (born 1988), pornographic model
- Polina Miller (born 1988), artistic gymnast
- Alexander Enbert (born 1989), pair skater
- Sergey Fesikov (born 1989), swimmer
- Katarina Gerboldt (born 1989), figure skater
- Nadezhda Grishaeva (born 1989), professional basketball player
- Katya Jones (born 1989), television personality (Strictly Come Dancing professional dancer), oil heiress
- Tatyana McFadden (born 1989), United States Paralympian athlete
- Slava Tutukin (born 1989), former ballet dancer and arts manager
- Andriy Yarmolenko (born 1989), Ukrainian football winger
- Anton Yelchin (1989–2016), American-raised actor, born in Saint Petersburg, who left with his parents at the age of six months; known for his role in Star Trek as Pavel Chekov, a character who is often implied to be from the city
- Alena Leonova (born 1990), figure skater
- Ksenia Polikarpova (born 1990), badminton player
- Julia Vlassov (born 1990), Russian-American figure skater

=== 1991–2000 ===
- Ekaterina Kramarenko (born 1991), artistic gymnast
- Alexander Majorov (born 1991), figure skater
- Maxim Matlakov (born 1991), chess Grandmaster
- Olga Smirnova (born 1991), prima ballerina with the Bolshoi Ballet
- Alexey Stadler (born 1991), cellist
- Ilya Zakharov (born 1991), diver, Olympics gold medalist (2012)
- Ksenia Makarova (born 1992), figure skater
- Viktor Manakov (born 1992), professional racing cyclist
- Alexey Romashov (born 1992), ski jumper
- Ksenia Stolbova (born 1992), pair skater
- Sergey Karasev (born 1993), professional basketball player
- Samira Mustafaeva (born 1993), Russian-Azerbaijani rhythmic gymnast
- Alexander Barabanov (born 1994), ice-hockey player
- Anish Giri (born 1994), Russian-Dutch chess prodigy and Grandmaster
- Tatiana Nabieva (born 1994), gymnast
- Alexandra Stepanova (born 1995), ice dancer
- Elizaveta Tuktamysehva (born 1996), figure skater
- Aleksei Gasilin (born 1996), professional football player
- Ramil Sheydayev (born 1996), Russian-Azerbaijani professional footballer
- Lilia Akhaimova (born 1997), artistic gymnast
- Daniel Koperberg (born 1997), Israeli basketball player
- Colton Gordon (born 1998), baseball pitcher
- Mikhail Maltsev (born 1998), ice-hockey player
- Alexander Alexeyev (born 1999), ice-hockey player
- Pasha Pozdniakova (born 1999), Finnish-Russian Playboy model and social-media influencer
- Natalia Safonova (born 1999), rhythmic gymnast

=== 21st century ===
- Makar Ignatov (born 2000), figure skater
- Maria Khoreva (born 2000), ballet dancer and first soloist of the Mariinsky Ballet
- Yuri Busse (born 2001), artistic gymnast
- Elena Eremina (born 2001), artistic gymnast
- Maria Sergeeva (born 2001), individual rhythmic gymnast
- Anastasia Smirnova (born 2001), ballet dancer
- Petr Gumennik (born 2002), figure skater
- Evgeni Semenenko (born 2003), figure skater

=== Year of birth unknown ===
- Alice Edun (born 20th century), gospel- and dance-music singer; born in Saint Petersburg before moving to Nigeria at age five (her mother is Russian, father is Nigerian)

== Lived in Saint Petersburg ==
=== 17th century and 18th century ===
- Domenico Trezzini (1670–1734), Swiss-Italian architect
- Joseph-Nicolas Delisle (1688–1768), French astronomer and cartographer; lived in Saint Petersburg for twenty-two years
- Harmen van Bol'es (1689–1764), royal master builder, 1713–1764; designed the ship wind vane which is used as an emblem of Saint Petersburg
- Daniel Bernoulli (1700–1782), Swiss mathematician and physicist; lived and worked in Saint Petersburg
- Francesco Bartolomeo Rastrelli (1700–1771), architect
- Leonhard Euler (1707–1783), Swiss mathematician and physicist; worked in Saint Petersburg and died there
- Mikhail Lomonosov (1711–1765), polymath, scientist and writer; worked in Saint Petersburg and died there
- Gabriel François Doyen (1726–1806), French painter
- Christian Friedrich von Völkner (1728–1796), German translator and historian; worked in Saint Petersburg and died there
- Alexander Suvorov (1730–1800), National Hero of Russia, generalissimo of the Russian Empire; died in Saint Petersburg
- Stanisław August Poniatowski (1732–1798), last elected king of Polish–Lithuanian Commonwealth; lover of empress Catherine the Great; after the Third and final Partition of Poland, prisoner in Saint Petersburg, 1795–1798, of her son and successor, emperor Paul I of Russia
- Shneur Zalman of Liadi (1745–1812), rabbi, philosopher, writer, founder and spiritual-leader of Chabad-Lubavitch movement; recognized as military supporter of tsar emporor Alexander I of Russia in the French Invasion of Russia
- Giacomo Quarenghi (1744–1817), architect
- Tadeusz Kościuszko (1746–1817), Polish military leader; imprisoned in Saint Petersburg
- Domenico Cimarosa (1749–1801), Italian opera composer; wrote two operas in Saint Petersburg
- Alexander Radishchev (1749–1802), novelist and social critic
- Joseph de Maistre (1753–1821), Savoyard philosopher, writer, lawyer, Freemason and diplomat; lived in Saint Petersburg for fourteen years
- Louis Philippe, comte de Ségur (1753–1830), French diplomat and historian
- Agustín de Betancourt (1754–1824), Spanish engineer urban planner of Saint Petersburg
- Heinrich Friedrich Karl vom und zum Stein (1757–1831), exiled during Napoleon's reign
- Andrey Voronikhin (1759–1814), architect and painter
- Étienne Dumont (1759–1829), Swiss-French political writer
- James Walker (c. 1760 – c. 1823), mezzotint engraver invited to Saint Petersburg by empress Catherine the Great and appointed as "Engraver to Her Imperial Majesty" for a duration of twenty years
- August von Kotzebue (1761–1819), German dramatist and writer; consul in Russia and Germany; from 1780 to 1783 in Saint Petersburg
- Nikolay Karamzin (1766–1826), writer and historian; died in Saint Petersburg
- John Quincy Adams (1767–1848), first U.S. ambassador in Saint Petersburg and sixth president of the United States
- Ernst Moritz Arndt (1769–1860), German patriotic author and poet, in his function as the secretary of Heinrich Friedrich Karl, baron von und zum Stein
- Vasily Stasov (1769–1848), architect
- Adam Jerzy Czartoryski (1770–1861), Polish statesman; friend of tsars and emperor Alexander I of Russia's foreign minister and key in forming the Third Coalition against France
- Adam Johann von Krusenstern (1770–1846), admiral and explorer; led the first Russian circumnavigation of the globe, early 19th century
- Yuri Lisyansky (1773–1837), explorer
- Joseph Saunders (1773–1845), English engraver; "Historical engraver to the Hermitage" under emperor Paul I of Russia
- Pierre Rode (1774–1830), violinist; worked in Saint Petersburg from 1804 until 1809
- Carlo Rossi (1775–1849), Italian architect
- François-Adrien Boieldieu (1775–1834), French composer of operas; called "the French Mozart"
- Władysław Grzegorz Branicki (1783–1843), Polish nobleman, landowner, Russian senator and army general
- Vasily Zhukovsky (1783–1852), poet
- Auguste de Montferrand (1786–1858), architect
- Karl Ernst Claus (1796–1864), Baltic German chemist and naturalist
- Imam Shamil (1797–1871), Avars political and religious leader of the Muslim tribes of the Northern Caucasus
- Alexander Pushkin (1799–1837), poet; died following a duel in Saint Petersburg

=== 19th century ===
- Fyodor Tyutchev (1803–1873), poet
- Mikhail Glinka (1804–1857), composer
- Nikolai Gogol (1809–1852), created the memorable image of Saint Petersburg in his fiction
- Vissarion Belinsky (1811–1848), literary critic; lived in Saint Petersburg, 1839–1848
- Ivan Goncharov (1812–1891), writer; died in Saint Petersburg
- Alexander Herzen (1812–1870), writer and thinker
- Nikolay Zinin (1812–1880), organic chemist
- Mikhail Lermontov (1814–1841), novelist, playwright, and poet
- Taras Shevchenko (1814–1861), Ukrainian artist, novelist, playwright, and poet; died in Saint Petersburg
- Marius Petipa (1818–1910), Marseille-born ballet master; worked for nearly sixty years in the Mariinsky Theatre
- Sergey Levitsky (1819–1898), photographer; opened Saint Petersburg's first photography studio, "Light Painting"
- Pafnuty Chebyshev (1821–1894), mathematician
- Fyodor Dostoyevsky (1821–1881), writer
- Nikolay Nekrasov (1821–1878), poet
- Heinrich Schliemann (1822–1890), archaeologist; worked as a tradesman based in Saint Petersburg
- Aleksey Pleshcheyev (1825–1893), poet
- Mikhail Saltykov-Shchedrin (1826–1889), writer, including satirist
- Carl Heinrich von Siemens (1829–1906), German entrepreneur; lived in Saint Petersburg, 1853–1867
- Nikolai Leskov (1831–1895), writer
- Alfred Nobel (1833–1896), Swedish chemist, engineer, innovator, and armaments manufacturer
- Feliks Sobański (1833–1913), Polish entrepreneur and philanthropist; held in Peter and Paul Fortress on sedition charges
- Dmitri Mendeleev (1834–1907), chemist and inventor; died in Saint Petersburg
- James McNeill Whistler (1834–1903), American painter; went to school in Saint Petersburg
- Nicholas of Japan (1836–1912), Russian Orthodox priest, monk, bishop, and saint
- Mily Balakirev (1837–1910), pianist, conductor and composer
- Modest Mussorgsky (1839–1881), composer; died and buried in Saint Petersburg
- Pyotr Ilyich Tchaikovsky (1840–1893), composer; died and buried in Saint Petersburg
- Peter Kropotkin (1842–1921), geographer, economist, activist, philologist, zoologist, evolutionary theorist, philosopher, writer and prominent anarchist
- Ilya Repin (1844–1930), painter
- Nikolai Rimsky-Korsakov (1844–1908), composer; worked primarily in Saint Petersburg
- Nicholas Miklouho-Maclay (1846–1888), ethnologist, anthropologist and biologist
- Anna Shabanova (1848–1932), one of the first women doctors in Russia; women's-rights activist; worked all her career at Ol'denburg Children's Hospital in Saint Petersburg
- Ivan Pavlov (1849–1936), physiologist; died in Leningrad
- Opanas Slastion (1855–1933), ethnographer and painter; studied at the Imperial Academy of Arts, lived and worked in Saint Petersburg for several years, before returning to Ukraine at the end of 19th century
- Andrey Markov (1856–1922), mathematician
- Alexander Makarov (1857–1919), politician; lived in Saint Petersburg, 1857–1917
- Alexander Popov (1859–1906), physicist; died in Saint Petersburg
- Anton Arensky (1861–1906), composer
- Alexander Gretchaninov (1864–1956), Romantic composer
- Maud Gonne (1866–1953), Irish actress; made her debut in Saint Petersburg
- Carl Gustaf Emil Mannerheim (1867–1951), Finnish military leader and statesman, 6th president of Finland; studied in Saint Petersburg
- Emma Goldman (1869–1940), anarchist
- Grigori Rasputin (1869–1916), Svengali of the last tsarina; murdered in Saint Petersburg
- Alexander Berkman (1870–1936), anarchist
- Vladimir Lenin (1870–1924), communist revolutionary, politician and political theorist; took over the capital in 1917
- Sergei Rachmaninoff (1873–1943), composer
- Nikolai Berdyaev (1874–1948), philosopher; lived in Saint Petersburg, 1908–1922
- Mikhail Kalinin (1875–1946), mayor after the revolution
- Aleksey Remizov (1877–1957), writer
- Boris Kustodiev (1878–1927), painter
- Kazimir Malevich (1879–1935), painter and art theorist; died in Leningrad
- Andrei Bely (1880–1934), wrote the novel Petersburg (1913)
- Alexander Grin (1880–1932), writer
- Alexander Kerensky (1881–1970), lawyer and major political leader before the Russian Revolutions of 1917, belonging to a moderate socialist party
- Nikolai Myaskovsky (1881–1950), composer
- Nicolai Hartmann (1882–1950), Baltic German philosopher
- Alexander Belyaev (1884–1942), writer; lived in Leningrad, 1928–1942
- Isaak Brodsky (1884–1939), painter
- Yevgeny Zamyatin (1884–1937), writer
- Marc Chagall (1887–1985), painter; studied in Saint Petersburg
- Nikolai Vavilov (1887–1943), biologist
- Vladimir K. Zworykin (1888–1982), Russian-American inventor and pioneer of television technology; studied in Saint Petersburg
- Anna Akhmatova (1889–1966), memoirist, poet, and translator; spent most of her life and died in Leningrad
- Igor Sikorsky (1889–1972), pioneer of aviation, 1903–1906, 1907–1909, 1912–1919
- Vaslav Nijinsky (1890–1950), ballerino; lived and worked in Saint Petersburg
- Sergei Prokofiev (1891–1953), composer, pianist, and conductor; studied, since 1904, at the Saint Petersburg Conservatory
- Vladimir Mayakovsky (1893–1930), poet; lived in Saint Petersburg, 1915–1918

=== 20th century ===
- Theodosius Dobzhansky (1900–1975), Russian-American biologist; lived in Leningrad, 1924–1927
- George Gamow (1904–1968), Soviet-American physicist; studied at the University of Leningrad, 1923–1929
- Daniel Prenn (1904–1991), Vilnius-born German, Polish, and British world-top-ten tennis player; lived in Saint Petersburg
- Yuri Knorozov (1922–1999), linguist; made pivotal breakthrough in the decipherment of Maya hieroglyphics
- Olga Ladyzhenskaya (1922–2004), mathematician
- Arkady Strugatsky (1925–1991), science-fiction writer
- Eduard Khil (1934–2012), Soviet-era singer; lived in Leningrad/Saint Petersburg, 1949–2012
- Rudolf Nureyev (1938–1993), ballerino; graduated from the Vaganova ballet school and worked in the Kirov Ballet
- Yuri Temirkanov (born 1938), conductor
- Mikhail Baryshnikov (born 1948), Latvian-American; graduated from the Vaganova ballet school and worked in the Kirov Ballet
- Brian Eno (born 1948), English, lived briefly in Saint Petersburg during the 1990s
- Valery Gergiev (born 1953), conductor
- Rolandas Paksas (born 1956), Lithuanian politician who was president of Lithuania, 2003–2004
- Alexander Sizonenko (1959–2012), Russia's largest man, standing 7-feet, 10- inches tall
- Maxim Petrov (born 1965), doctor; killed twelve patients between 1998 and 2000
- Ulyana Lopatkina (born 1973), principal ballerina with Kirov/Mariinsky Ballet, resident of Saint Petersburg since 1984
- Ilyas Vasipov (1974–2016), journalist
- Denis Ugarov (born 1975), professional football coach and a former player; made his professional debut in the Russian Second Division in 1993 for FC Zenit-2 St. Petersburg
- Fedor Emelianenko (born 1976), heavyweight mixed martial artist and Sambo fighter
- Andrei Kirilenko (born 1981), Russian-American National Basketball Association player; grew up in Saint Petersburg
- Nu-Nation (formed 2009), nu-metal musical group
- Edita Piekha (born 1937), People's Artist of the USSR; born in Noyelles-sous-Lens, France, to Polish immigrants; came to Saint Petersburg (Leningrad at the time) in 1955 to study at the University of Leningrad (Saint Petersburg); has remained ever since; named Honorary Citizen of Saint Petersburg in 2023

== See also ==
- List of Russian people
- List of Russian-language poets
- Ves Peterburg (a series of directories of residents and streets in Saint Petersburg)
