= Chernigovsky =

Chernigovsky (masculine; Russian: Черниговский, Ukrainian: Чернігівський, Polish: Czernichowski), Chernigovskaya (feminine; Russian: Черниговская, Ukrainian: Чернігівська, Polish: Czernichowska), or Chernigovskoye (neuter) may refer to:

Places

- Chernigovsky District, a district of Primorsky Krai, Russia
- Chernigovsky (rural locality) (Chernigovskaya, Chernigovskoye), name of several rural localities in Russia

People

- Andrey Chernigovsky (born 1983), Russian soccer player
- Krystian Czernichowski (1930–2014), Polish basketball player
- Nikifor Chernigovsky (died 1675), Polish noble
- Tatyana Chernigovskaya (born 1947), Russian scientist in the field of neuroscience, psycholinguistics and theory of mind

== See also ==
- Chernihiv
