= Völkner =

Völkner or Volkner is a German-language surname and a derivative of the personal name Volk. It may refer to:

- Carl Sylvius Völkner (c. 1819 – 1865), German-born Protestant missionary in New Zealand
- Christian Friedrich von Völkner (1728–1796), German translator and historian in Russia
- Iris Völkner (1960), German rower
- Jirí Volkner (1931–2018), Czechoslovak sprint canoer
