= Suleymanov =

Suleymanov / Süleymanov / Suleimanov or Suleymanova / Süleymanova / Suleimanova (feminine) is a common surname. The surname is derived from the Islamic male given name Suleyman.

- Baghir Suleimanov (1959–2026), Azerbaijani petroleum scientist and academic
- Elin Suleymanov (born 1970), Azerbaijani ambassador
- Elkhan Suleymanov (born 1974), Azerbaijani weightlifter
- Elmira Süleymanova (1937–2024), Azerbaijani chemist
- Idris Suleymanov (1915–1986), Hero of the Soviet Union
- Khalimakhon Suleymanova (1907–1993), Tajik farmer
- Magomed Suleimanov (1976–2015), Dagestani Islamist
- Magomed-Shapi Suleymanov (born 1999), Russian footballer
- Manaf Suleymanov (1912–2001), Azerbaijani writer, translator, and historian
- Nazim Suleymanov (born 1965), Soviet and Azerbaijani footballer
- Nijat Suleymanov (born 1998), Azerbaijani footballer
- Nikita Suleymanov (born 2001), Russian footballer
- Rashit Suleymanov (born 1950), Uzbek sculptor
- Renart Suleymanov (born 1937), Soviet sport shooter
- Renat Suleymanov (born 1965), Russian politician
- Sanan Suleymanov (born 1996), Azerbaijani Greco-Roman wrestler
- Servin Suleimanov (born 1980), Ukrainian boxer
- Timur Suleymanov (born 2000), Russian footballer
- Tunzala Suleymanova (born 1987), Azerbaijani footballer
- Vladimir Suleimanov (born 1985), Russian footballer

== See also ==
- Suleiman
