= David Huddleston (gymnast) =

Bulgarian gymnast

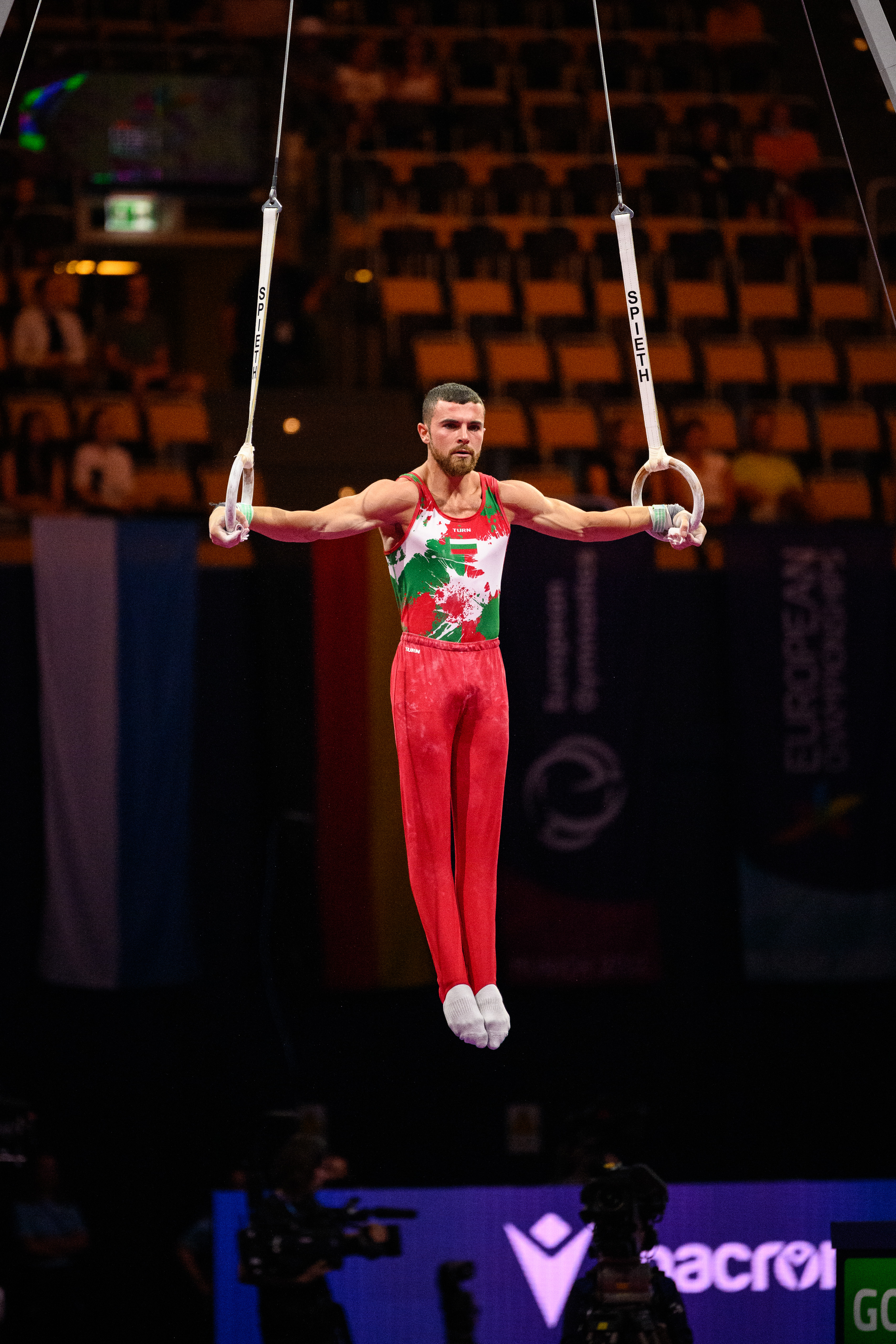
- Huddleston at the 2022 European Championships

Personal information
- Full name: David Justus Huddleston
- Born: 9 August 2000 (age 26) The Hague, Netherlands
- Height: 171 cm (5 ft 7 in)

Gymnastics career
- Country represented: Bulgaria
- Head coach: Damian Ignatov
Medal record
Men's artistic gymnastics
Representing Bulgaria
FIG World Cup
| Event | 1st | 2nd | 3rd |
|---|---|---|---|
| World Challenge Cup | 0 | 1 | 1 |
| Total | 0 | 1 | 1 |

David Justus Huddleston (born 9 August 2000) is a Bulgarian artistic gymnast. He represented Bulgaria at the 2020 Summer Olympics.

== Early life ==
Born in the Netherlands to a Bulgarian mother and an American father, Huddleston has spent time living in the Cayman Islands, the USA, and Bulgaria. He has mostly been a distance learner, though he was enrolled in a Bulgarian school between grades 3 and 7. He has an older sister, Veselina, who is a medical student, as well as a younger brother, Matey, who is a marathon runner.

== Gymnastics career ==
Huddleston began gymnastics at the age of three in the Cayman Islands and continued his training after moving to Bulgaria in 2008.

=== Junior ===
Huddleston made his international debut at the 2014 Junior European Championships when he was 13 years old, making him one of the youngest at the competition. He finished 12th in the all-around final and also advanced to the pommel horse and parallel bars finals, finishing fifth in both. He was the first reserve for the all-around final at the 2016 Junior European Championships and finished 25th with the Bulgarian team.

Huddleston won a bronze medal on the floor exercise at the 2017 European Youth Olympic Festival behind Nicolau Mir and Yuri Busse. In 2018, he tore his bicep at a training camp in Moscow and missed a year of competition.

=== Senior ===
Huddleston won his first FIG World Cup medal at the 2019 Mersin World Challenge Cup when he finished second on the vault. He then competed at the 2019 World Championships and finished 39th in the all-around during the qualification round. With this result, he qualified for the 2020 Summer Olympics.

At the 2020 European Championships, Huddleston helped the Bulgarian team finish fifth, and he finished eighth in the parallel bars final. He won a bronze medal on the parallel bars at the 2021 Osijek World Challenge Cup, behind Ferhat Arıcan and Milad Karimi. In June 2021, Huddleston dislocated his ankle and tore multiple ligaments. He still chose to compete at the Olympic Games one month later despite the injury. He finished 59th in the all-around during the qualifications and did not advance into any finals.

== Personal life ==
Huddleston was in a relationship with Bulgarian rhythmic gymnast and Olympic champion Erika Zafirova.
