= Anatoly Gladilin =

Russian writer (1935–2018)

- Анато́лий Ти́хонович Глади́лин
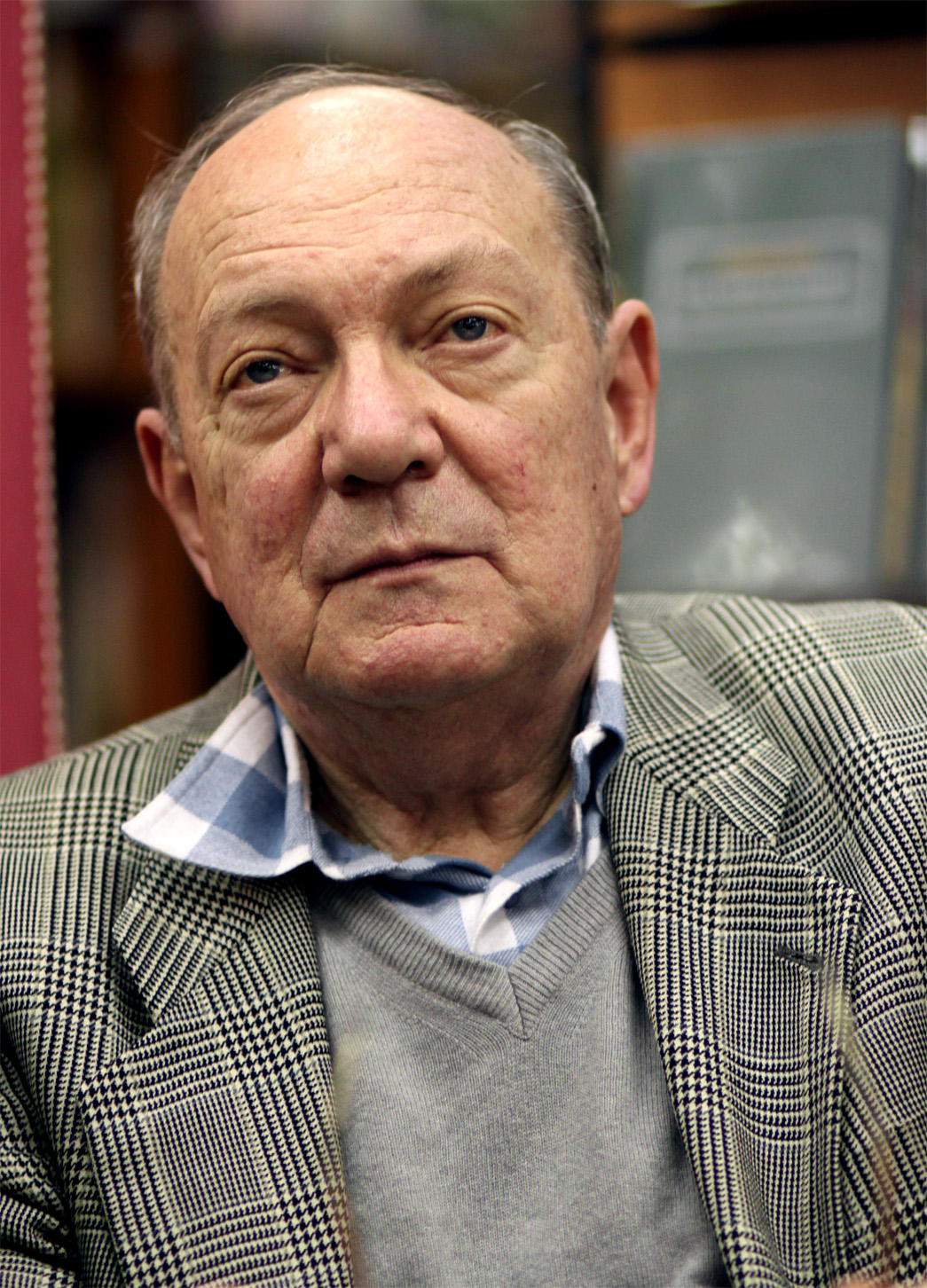
- Gladilin in 2011
- Born: 21 August 1935; Moscow, RSFSR, Soviet Union
- Died: 24 October 2018 (aged 83); Châtillon, Hauts-de-Seine
- Citizenship: Soviet
- Education: Maxim Gorky Literature Institute (didn't complete)
- Occupations: Writer, dissident
- Known for: his participation in Soviet dissidents movement and struggle against political abuse of psychiatry in the Soviet Union
- Movement: Soviet nonconformism
- Awards: Pushkin Medal

Anatoly Tikhonovich Gladilin (Russian: Анато́лий Ти́хонович Глади́лин, IPA: [ɐnɐˈtolʲɪj ˈtʲixənəvʲɪdʑ ɡlɐˈdʲilʲɪn]; 21 August 1935 — 24 October 2018) was a Soviet and Russian writer who defected from the Soviet Union in 1976 and subsequently lived in Paris.

== Biography ==
His “Chronicle of the Times of Viktor Podgursky,” published in the magazine “Yunost” at the end of 1956, had a great resonance. The writer was only 20 years old, and this alone already looked unusual for that time. The story is written in the genre of “confessional prose” and examines the theme of anxiety and inner loneliness of a living and sincere person in a world of regulated values.

In his own words, he left the Literary Institute without finishing it, and did not know what to do next. But he unexpectedly received an invitation to Moskovskij Komsomolets to work as the head of the literature and art department[5].

In the sixties, Gladilin was considered a talented and promising young Soviet writer along with Vasily Aksyonov. In 1964, he took part in writing the collective detective novel He Who Laughs, published in the newspaper “Nedelya”.

Gladilin openly opposed the trial of Andrei Sinyavsky and Yuli Daniel. The story “Forecast for Tomorrow,” written in 1972, was published only by the emigrant publishing house “Posev.”

In 1976, Anatoly Gladilin was forced to emigrate from the USSR with his wife and daughter on an Israeli visa.

In Paris, Gladilin worked for the Radio Liberty and the Deutsche Welle. Among his published works in the West was a novel, FSSR: The French Soviet Socialist Republic — a tale of a Communist coup in France.

Gladilin was awarded the Medal of Pushkin in 2012.

== Selected works ==
- Brigantine Raises Sails, Moscow: Soviet Writer, 1959.
- Going Ahead, Moscow: Young Guard, 1962.
- Forecast for Tomorrow, Frankfurt: Possev, 1972.
- Dreams of the Schlusselburg Fortress, Moscow: Politizdat, 1974.
- The Making and Unmaking of a Soviet Writer: My Story of the Young Prose of the Sixties and After, Ardis, 1979.
- Moscow Racetrack: A Novel of Espionage at the Track (trans. J.G. Tucker and R. P. Schoenberg), Ardis, 1990.
- Rogues, Welcome to Paris!, Moscow: Zakharov, 2007.
