= Yunost =

Soviet and Russian literary magazine

Yunost (Russian: Ю́ность, Youth) is a Russian language literary magazine created in 1955 in Moscow (initially as a USSR Union of Writers' organ) by Valentin Kataev, its first editor-in-chief, who was fired in 1961 for publishing Vasily Aksyonov's Ticket to the Stars. In Yunost, which appealed to the young intellectual readership and contained an impressive poetry section, were premiered some significant, occasionally controversial (from the Soviet censorship's point of view) works of Anna Akhmatova, Bella Akhmadulina, Bulat Okudzhava, Nikolay Rubtsov, Yevgeny Yevtushenko, Andrey Voznesensky, Evegeny Bachurin, Robert Rozhdestvensky, Boris Vasilyev, Andrei Molchanov, Rimma Kazakova, Mikhail Zadornov, Fazil Iskander, Vasily Aksyonov, Anatoly Gladilin, Anatoly Kuznetsov, Grigory Gorin, Nikolay Leonov and others. Since 1991 Yunost is an independently published journal.

== Editors-in-chief ==
- 1955—1961 Valentin Katayev
- 1961—1981 Boris Polevoy
- 1981—1992 Andrey Dementyev
- 1992—2007 Victor Lipatov
- 2007— Valery Dudarev
