= Aleksandr Kartsev =

Russian artistic gymnast

Aleksandr Kartsev Александр Карцев
- Full name: Aleksandr Nikolayevich Kartsev
- Nicknames: Sasha, Sanya
- Born: 31 December 2001 (age 24) Vladimir, Russia
- Height: 1.68 m (5 ft 6 in)

Gymnastics career
- Discipline: Men's artistic gymnastics
- Country represented: Russia (2015–present)
- Club: CSKA Moscow, Tolkachev Gymnastics Sports School
- Head coaches: Igor Kalabushkin, A.A. Tikunov
Medal record
Men's artistic gymnastics
Representing Russia & (Individual Neutral Athletes) AIN
Event	1st	2nd	3rd
FIG World Cup	0	2	3

Aleksandr Nikolayevich Kartsev (Russian: Александр Николаевич Карцев; born 31 December 2001) is a Russian artistic gymnast. He competed as an individual representing the Russian Olympic Committee at the 2020 Summer Olympics.

== Gymnastics career ==
=== 2017–2018 ===
As a junior, Kartsev competed at the 2017 European Youth Olympic Festival where he was part of the Russian team alongside Yuri Busse and Sergei Naidin that won the team gold medal ahead of Great Britain and Switzerland. He also won two individual medals: a gold on the horizontal bar and a silver on the parallel bars.

=== 2019–2022 ===
Kartsev became age-eligible for senior level competition in 2019. He competed at the Osijek World Cup, winning silver on the horizontal bar, as well as bronze on parallel bars. He placed seventh in the parallel bars final at the 2019 Paris World Challenge Cup.

Kartsev represented Russia at the 2021 European Championships in Basel, Switzerland. He placed third in the all-around during qualifications but did not reach the final due to the two-per-country rule, as his teammates Nikita Nagornyy and David Belyavskiy finished ahead of him.

Kartsev is a two-time (2020 and 2021) Russian national all-around champion.

In June 2021, Kartsev was named to the Russian men's gymnastics team for the Tokyo Olympics alongside Nagornyy, Belyavskiy, and Artur Dalaloyan. However, it was later announced that Kartsev would compete at the Games as an individual, and Denis Ablyazin would take his place on the team. Kartsev placed 29th in the all-around during qualifications and did not advance to the final.

In early 2022, the International Gymnastics Federation banned Russian and Belarusian athletes and officials from taking part in FIG-sanctioned competitions due to the Russian invasion of Ukraine.

=== 2025–present ===
Starting in 2025, the Artistic Gymnastics Federation of Russia began letting their athletes to apply for neutral status, allowing them to return to international competition. Kartsev was selected to compete at the 2025 World Championships; however he was injured just before the qualification round began and he was not able to compete.

At the 2026 Cottbus World Cup, Kartsev won silver on parallel bars and bronze on floor exercise and horizontal bar. At the 2026 Russian Cup, Kartsev helped the Vladimir Oblast place second as a team. During the all-around final, he injured his sternum while performing on the rings; as a result he withdrew from the remainder of the competition and underwent surgery.

== Competitive history ==
Competitive history of Aleksandr Kartsev at the junior level
Year	Event	Team	AA	FX	PH	SR	VT	PB	HB
2012	Olympic Hopes Russia		15						
2014	Olympic Hopes Russia		3rd place, bronze medalist(s)					1st place, gold medalist(s)	1st place, gold medalist(s)
2014	Hopes of Russia		7	4					6
2015	Russian Junior Championships (CMS)		7	4					7
2015	Youth Spartakiad	8	4	4		8		4	3rd place, bronze medalist(s)
2015	Prize of the Olympic Champion A. Nemov	11	3rd place, bronze medalist(s)	7	2nd place, silver medalist(s)	3rd place, bronze medalist(s)	1st place, gold medalist(s)		3rd place, bronze medalist(s)
2016	Central Federal Championships	2nd place, silver medalist(s)	1st place, gold medalist(s)	5	6	1st place, gold medalist(s)		2nd place, silver medalist(s)	1st place, gold medalist(s)
2016	Russian Junior Championships(CMS)	5	4	7	8	3rd place, bronze medalist(s)			5
2017	European Youth Olympic Festival	1st place, gold medalist(s)		9				2nd place, silver medalist(s)	1st place, gold medalist(s)
2017	International Junior Team-Cup	1st place, gold medalist(s)				1st place, gold medalist(s)		2nd place, silver medalist(s)	
2017	Youth Spartakiad		4	3rd place, bronze medalist(s)	7			4	7
2017	Voronin Cup Junior		1st place, gold medalist(s)		7		1st place, gold medalist(s)	5	2nd place, silver medalist(s)
2018	Summer Youth Spartakiad	15	1st place, gold medalist(s)	1st place, gold medalist(s)	2nd place, silver medalist(s)	4	1st place, gold medalist(s)		5
2018	Voronin Cup Junior	3rd place, bronze medalist(s)	1st place, gold medalist(s)	6			2nd place, silver medalist(s)		4

Competitive history of Aleksandr Kartsev at the senior level
Year	Event	Team	AA	FX	PH	SR	VT	PB	HB
2019	Osijek World Cup			28			7	3rd place, bronze medalist(s)	2nd place, silver medalist(s)
2019	Russian Cup		9				5	4	4
2019	Paris World Challenge Cup			18			13	7	
2020	National Championships	1st place, gold medalist(s)	1st place, gold medalist(s)			7		1st place, gold medalist(s)	2nd place, silver medalist(s)
2020	Kaluga Region Governor's Cup	3rd place, bronze medalist(s)	1st place, gold medalist(s)	1st place, gold medalist(s)	6	1st place, gold medalist(s)		2nd place, silver medalist(s)	1st place, gold medalist(s)
2021	National Championships	1st place, gold medalist(s)	1st place, gold medalist(s)	2nd place, silver medalist(s)	2nd place, silver medalist(s)			3rd place, bronze medalist(s)	1st place, gold medalist(s)
2021	European Championships		(Note: Kartsev placed third during the qualification round but did not advance to the final due to two-per-country limitations)						
2021	Russian Cup		2nd place, silver medalist(s)	2nd place, silver medalist(s)				7	5
2021	Olympic Games		29						
2021	Tolkachyov Competition		1st place, gold medalist(s)	3rd place, bronze medalist(s)					
2021	Kaluga Region Governor's Cup	1st place, gold medalist(s)	1st place, gold medalist(s)	2nd place, silver medalist(s)	6	4			8
2022	Doha World Cup							6	
2022	Spartakiad	2nd place, silver medalist(s)	9		7			8	5
2025
2025	World Championships		DNS						
2026	Cottbus World Cup			3rd place, bronze medalist(s)				2nd place, silver medalist(s)	3rd place, bronze medalist(s)
2026	Russian Cup	2nd place, silver medalist(s)	DNF	WD	WD			WD	WD
