= Chernigovsky (rural locality) =

Chernigovsky (Russian: Черни́говский; masculine), Chernigovskaya (Черни́говская; feminine), or Chernigovskoye (Черни́говское; neuter) is the name of several rural localities in Russia:

- Chernigovsky, Republic of Bashkortostan, a khutor in Tlyaumbetovsky Selsoviet of Kugarchinsky District of the Republic of Bashkortostan
- Chernigovsky, Chelyabinsk Oblast, a settlement in Chernigovsky Selsoviet of Agapovsky District of Chelyabinsk Oblast
- Chernigovsky, Kirov Oblast, a settlement under the administrative jurisdiction of the town of Kirs in Verkhnekamsky District of Kirov Oblast
- Chernigovsky, Kagalnitsky District, Rostov Oblast, a khutor in Ivanovo-Shamshevskoye Rural Settlement of Kagalnitsky District of Rostov Oblast
- Chernigovsky, Proletarsky District, Rostov Oblast, a khutor in Budennovskoye Rural Settlement of Proletarsky District of Rostov Oblast
- Chernigovskoye, a selo in Prokhladnensky District of the Kabardino-Balkar Republic
