= Gymnastics at the 2017 European Youth Summer Olympic Festival =

- Venue: Radnóti street Sport Centre – Gymnastics Hall
- Location: (Hungary) Győr
- Dates: July 23 – July 30

Gymnastics at the 2017 European Youth Summer Olympic Festival took place from 23 July to 30 July in Győr, Hungary in the Radnóti Street Sport Centre.

== Medal summary ==
=== Medal table ===
==== Overall ====
Rank	Nation	Gold	Silver	Bronze	Total
1	Russia	9	5	2	16
2	Great Britain	2	1	1	4
3	Italy	1	4	2	7
4	Spain	1	0	3	4
5	Switzerland	1	0	1	2
6	Germany	0	1	1	2
7	Belarus	0	1	0	1
7	Croatia	0	1	0	1
7	Romania	0	1	0	1
10	Belgium	0	0	2	2
11	Bulgaria	0	0	1	1
11	France	0	0	1	1
Totals (12 entries)		14	14	14	42

==== Boys ====
Rank	Nation	Gold	Silver	Bronze	Total
1	Russia (RUS)	4	4	1	9
2	Great Britain (GBR)	2	1	0	3
3	Spain (ESP)	1	0	3	4
4	Switzerland (SUI)	1	0	1	2
5	Belarus (BLR)	0	1	0	1
5	Croatia (CRO)	0	1	0	1
5	Italy (ITA)	0	1	0	1
8	Belgium (BEL)	0	0	2	2
9	Bulgaria (BUL)	0	0	1	1
Totals (9 entries)		8	8	8	24

==== Girls ====
Rank	Nation	Gold	Silver	Bronze	Total
1	Russia (RUS)	5	1	1	7
2	Italy (ITA)	1	3	2	6
3	Germany (GER)	0	1	1	2
4	Romania (ROU)	0	1	0	1
5	France (FRA)	0	0	1	1
5	Great Britain (GBR)	0	0	1	1
Totals (6 entries)		6	6	6	18

=== Medals events ===
==== Boys ====
Event	Gold	Silver	Bronze
Team all-around	Russia; Yuri Busse; Sergei Naidin; Aleksandr Kartsev	Great Britain; Jamie Lewis; Jake Jarman; Pavel Karnejenko	Switzerland; David Bieri; Andrin Frey; Dominic Tamsel
Individual all-around	Jamie Lewis; Great Britain	Yuri Busse; Russia	Nicolau Mir; Spain
Floor	Nicolau Mir; Spain	Yuri Busse; Russia	David Huddleston; Bulgaria
Pommel horse	Sergei Naidin; Russia	Mauro Nemčanin; Croatia	Ward Claeys; Belgium
Rings	Jamie Lewis; Great Britain	Yuri Busse; Russia	Sergei Naidin; Russia
Vault	Andrin Frey; Switzerland	Sviataslau Dranitski; Belarus	Nicolau Mir; Spain
Parallel bars	Sergei Naidin; Russia	Aleksandr Kartsev; Russia	Nicolau Mir; Spain
Horizontal bar	Aleksandr Kartsev; Russia	Nicolò Mozzato; Italy	Mattis Bouchet; Belgium

==== Girls ====
Event	Gold	Silver	Bronze
Team all-around	Russia; Ksenia Klimenko; Varvara Zubova; Valeria Saifulina	Italy; Asia D'Amato; Elisa Iorio; Alice D'Amato	Germany; Emelie Petz; Kim Alene Ruoff
Individual all-around	Ksenia Klimenko; Russia	Asia D'Amato; Italy	Varvara Zubova; Russia
Vault	Valeria Saifulina; Russia	Denisa Golgota; Romania	Asia D'Amato; Italy
Uneven bars	Elisa Iorio; Italy	Ksenia Klimenko; Russia	Asia D'Amato; Italy
Balance beam	Ksenia Klimenko; Russia	Asia D'Amato; Italy	Amelie Morgan; Great Britain
Floor	Ksenia Klimenko; Russia	Emelie Petz; Germany	Célia Serber; France
