= Chernigovsky, Republic of Bashkortostan =

Chernigovsky Черниговский
- Khutor
- Location within Bashkortostan Location within Russia
- Coordinates: 52°39′N 56°16′E
- Country: Russia
- Region: Bashkortostan
- District: Kugarchinsky District
- Time zone: UTC+5:00

Chernigovsky (Russian: Черниговский) is a rural locality (a khutor) in Tlyaumbetovsky Selsoviet, Kugarchinsky District, Bashkortostan, Russia. The population was 61 as of 2010. There is 1 street.

== Geography ==
Chernigovsky is located 41 km west of Mrakovo (the district's administrative centre) by road. Tlyaumbetovo is the nearest rural locality.
