= Illaria Obidenna Ladré =

Russian ballerina

Illaria Obidenna Ladré (Russian: Иллария Обиденна Ладре; 26 November 1906 – 24 May 1998) was a Russian ballet dancer in the Diaghilev Ballets Russes and later, between 1932 and 1946, for the troupe run by Colonel Wassily de Basil. During her career, she was known as Lara Obidenna (occasionally spelled Obydennaya), though after ending her performance career, she began using her married name, Illaria Ladré.

== Early life and career ==
Obidenna was born on November 26, 1906, in St. Petersburg in the Russia Empire. After the revolution, she began her training in the Imperial Theatre School also known as the Maryinsky School, where she was part of Agrippina Vaganova’s first class.

In 1923, Obidenna moved to Paris and danced with various troupes. She married Marian Ladré, a fellow ballet dancer in 1926, becoming Illaria Ladré, though she kept her stage name, Lara Obidenna, during her career. She eventually joined the Diaghilev Ballets Russes in 1927 along with her husband. Obidenna danced with the company until Diaghilev’s death in 1929, at which point, she, her husband, and a few others persuaded René Blum and Colonel Wassily de Basil to start the Ballet Russe. When there became a rift between the two and they went their separate ways, Obidenna stayed with Colonel de Basil and his Ballet Russe de Monte Carlo, which went through a few company name changes after they lost the rights to the name including Ballets Russes du Colonel W. de Basil (De Monte Carlo) and the Original Ballet Russe, among others. She danced with them from the establishment of the company in 1932 until 1946, though she did continue performing through 1947. The company's first performance was on January 17, 1932, in Monte Carlo. Obidenna danced mainly corps de ballet roles, but she also occasionally performed as a soloist for character roles. As one of the more experienced dancers, she would teach the symphonic ballets to younger dancers and generally oversaw classes and rehearsals, especially when necessary during tours.

The company went to New York on tour in 1934 and was scheduled to return to the United States after the summer of 1936. However, due to good prospects in Australia, de Basil split the troupe in two. The main company went to New York, and the rest merged with the ballet company of Léon Woizikovsky and went to Australia, dancing under the name “The Monte-Carlo Russian Ballet”. Obidenna and her husband were in the main company, which proceeded to have a London season in Covent Garden before finally joining the rest of the company in Australia for their second and third tours as the Covent Garden Russian Ballet and the Original Ballet Russe respectively.

During her time with de Basil's company, Obidenna performed in numerous works, including Carnaval (Valse Noble), Scuola di ballo (Lucrèzia), La boutique fantasque (American's Wife), La concurrence (Second Couple), Les femmes de bonne humeur (Silvestra), Petrouchka [Petrushka] (Chief Nursemaid), Choreartium, Le Tricorne, Prince Igor (Polovtsian Women), Scheherezade (Sultan's Women), Les Presages (Temptation, Destinies, Variation), Le Coq d'Or, The Blue Danube (Dressmakers), Le Mariage d’Aurore (Polonaise, Scene and Dance of the Duchesses), The malon (Rosario's Mother), and Les Sylphides (Nocturne), .

The dancers in the company also performed in a number of operas, and between January 23 and April 8, 1930, while in Monte Carlo, she performed in such operas as: Madame Butterfly, Mefistofole, Walkiere, Rigoletto, Barbiere de Seviglia, Die Agyptische, Hélène, La Bohème, Quo Vadis, Turandot, La Damnation de Faust, Carmen, Boris Goudenov, Eine Nacht in Venedig, Tosca, Satan—Faust, and Don Quichotte.

== Tours with de Basil ==
On the whole, de Basil's company maintained a repertory of over 100 ballets, had 40 world premiers, and appeared in 26 operas. In total, they gave over 4,000 performances in 600 cities in 70 countries around the globe. Illaria traveled with the company a great deal, including performing in the following countries (London is not listed as the company performed in Covent Garden every year during the summer season):

1932 - Principality of Monaco (the company's first performance)

1935 - United States (the company's first performance in the United States was in October at The Metropolitan Opera)

1936-1937 - United States

1937-1938 - United States

1938-1939 - Australia

1939 - New Zealand

1939-1940 - Australia

1940-1941 - United States

1941 - Cuba

1941 - Canada

1942 - Mexico

1943 - Argentina

1945 - Ecuador

1945 - Guatemala

1946 - Mexico

1946 - Brazil

1946 - Cuba

== Later life and teaching career ==
After she stopped performing, Obidenna taught for a little while in New York. Then, in 1948, she and her husband moved to Seattle, where they opened the Ballet Academy and taught for the rest of their lives. Obidenna also went on to stage ballets such as The Nutcracker for various companies.

Later, in 1988, a Bellingham dance teacher named Nancy Whyte helped Obidenna compile and self-publish her memoirs of her life in a book titled Illaria Obidenna Ladré: memoirs of a child of Theatre Street: an autobiography. The two had previously collaborated in 1985 to work on the choreography of and produce The Nutcracker in Bellingham (which became a yearly show) as part of Whyte's desire to study classical repertory with Obidenna.

During her time on the stage, Obidenna danced with George Balanchine in New York, and in 1988, she reconstructed his 1932 dance, Cotillon, for The Joffrey Ballet.

Illaria Obidenna Ladré died of a stroke on May 24, 1998, at the age of 91.

== Awards ==
- 1989 - King County Arts Commission Arts Service Award
- 1994 - Vaslav Nijinsky Award (awarded by the Republic of Poland and sponsored by the Polish Artists Agency in Warsaw)
