= Evegeny Bachurin =

Evgeny Vladimirovich Bachurin Евгений Владимирович Бачурин
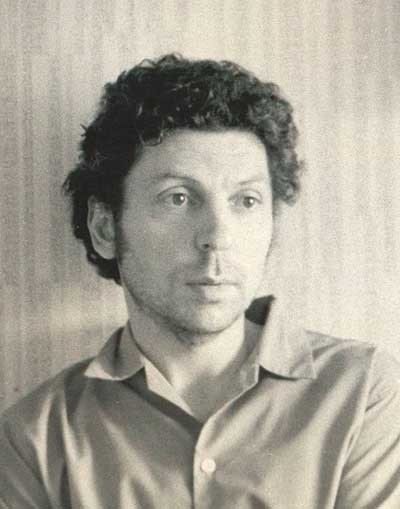

Background information
- Born: May 24, 1934; Leningrad, USSR (present-day Saint Petersburg, Russia)
- Died: January 1, 2015 (aged 80) Moscow, Russia
- Occupations: Poet, singer, painter, musician

Evgeny Vladimirovich Bachurin (Note: Russian: Евгений Владимирович Бачурин, romanized: Yevgeny Vladimirovich Bachurin) (1934 – 2015) was a Soviet and Russian poet, bard, and artist. He became an Honored Artist of the Russian Federation in 2005. He became well known for his prolific composing and painting, of which was presented throughout Europe from Sweden to the United States. However, during his lifetime he was never being formally accepted into the Union of Russian Composers despite his status as an 'Honored Artist.'

As a poet and writer, he was equally prolific and had many of his poems published in several of the leading literary journals at the time including "Yunost”, “Znamya”, “Rural Youth," and formal channels like the "Literary Gazette", "New Russian Word," and "Russian Mind."

Evgeny died on January 1, 2015. He was buried in Moscow at the Golovinsky cemetery in the Khovrino district.

== Discography ==
=== Albums ===
- 1980: Chess On The Balcony
- 1982: Trees
- 1986: I Propose To Sing About That
- 1990: I Am Your Shadow
- 1991: Drunk Ship

== Recordings ==
- "Waiting for Cherries" (1994)
- “Everything about love” (1997)
- “Hawk from Above” (2000)
- "Woman and Man" (2000)
- "Mixing Truth and Lies" (2000)
- “Years of Feast (selected)” (2002)
- "Anniversary" (2004)

== Books ==
- 1999: I Am Your Shadow (Moscow: Book Garden Publishers, 1999)
- 2004: Trees, You Are My Trees (Ripol Classics)
