= Roman Savushkin =

Russian professor (born 1977)

- Born: Роман Александрович Савушкин; November 5, 1977 (age 49); Leningrad, USSR
- Occupation: Scientist

Roman Savushkin (Russian: Роман Александрович Савушкин; born 5 November 1977, in Leningrad) — is a Russian scientist. He received a degree from the St. Petersburg State Transport University and University Antwerp Management School. Roman Savushkin holds a scientific degree of PhD in Technical Sciences..

== Publications ==
- Development of the wheel profile for freight wagons of 1520 mm track gauge. Fedorova V., Orlova A., Savushkin R. XIX International Wheelset Congress, 2019, Italy
- Improving of Freight Car Cast Wheels Mechanical Properties. Bezobrazov Yu., Broytman O., Orlova A., Savushkin R. XIX International Wheelset Congress, 2019, Italy.
- International Heavy Haul Association Conference, South Africa, 2017. Orlova A., Savushkin R., Sokolov A., Dmitriev S., Rudakova E., Krivchenkov A., Kudryavtsev M., Fedorova V. Development and testing of freight wagons for 27 t per axle loads for 1520 mm gauge railways. ISBN 978-0-911-382-66-2 // - P. 1089-1096.
- International symposium on Dynamics of Vehicles on Roads and Tracks, Australia, 2017. Improvements in strain gage technology to measure dynamic forces acting on bogie parts and rails. Orlova A.M., Savushkin R.A., Shevchenko D.V., Kuklin T.S., Kuzmitskiy Y.O. Dmitriev S.V. & Belyankin A.V.
- International Wheelset Congress, China, 2016. Production of Railcar Cast Wheels in Sand Molds. Broytman O.A., Orlova A.M., Savushkin R.A., Bezobrazov Yu.A.
- The improvement of underground vehicles bogie construction, 1996, Bitiutsky A.A.1, Sveshnikov L.A.1, Sapozhnikov A.N.1, Savushkin R.A.
