= Anna Podlesnaya =

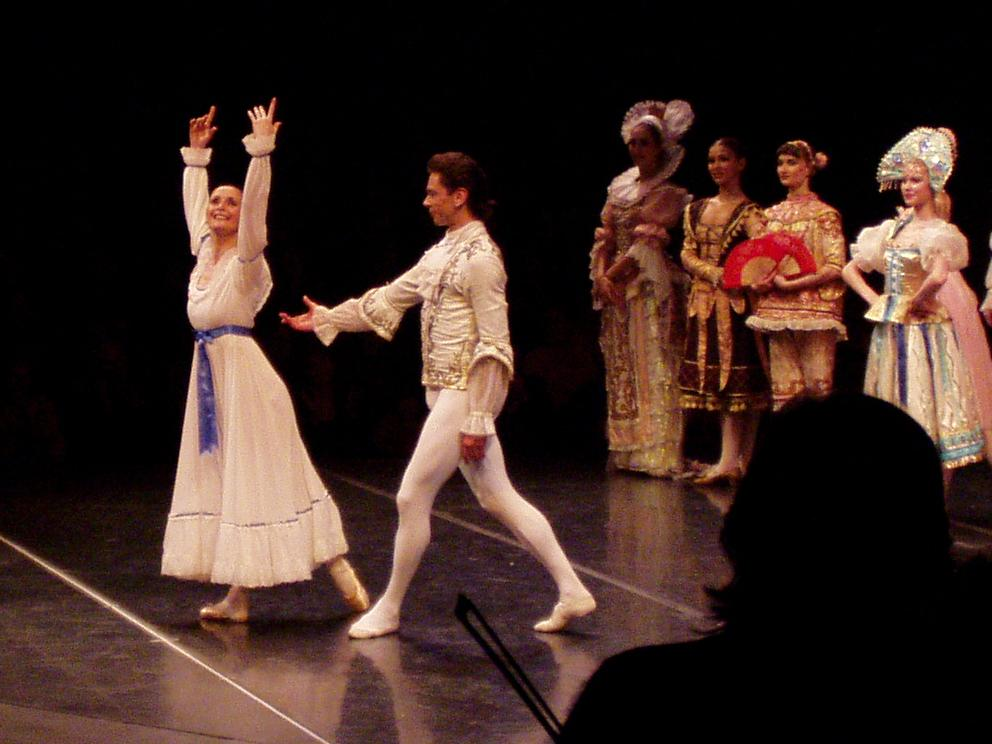
Anna Podlesnaya as Clara and Andrei Stelmakhov as Nutcracker Prince in a Saint Petersburg Ballet Theatre 2007 production of The Nutcracker.

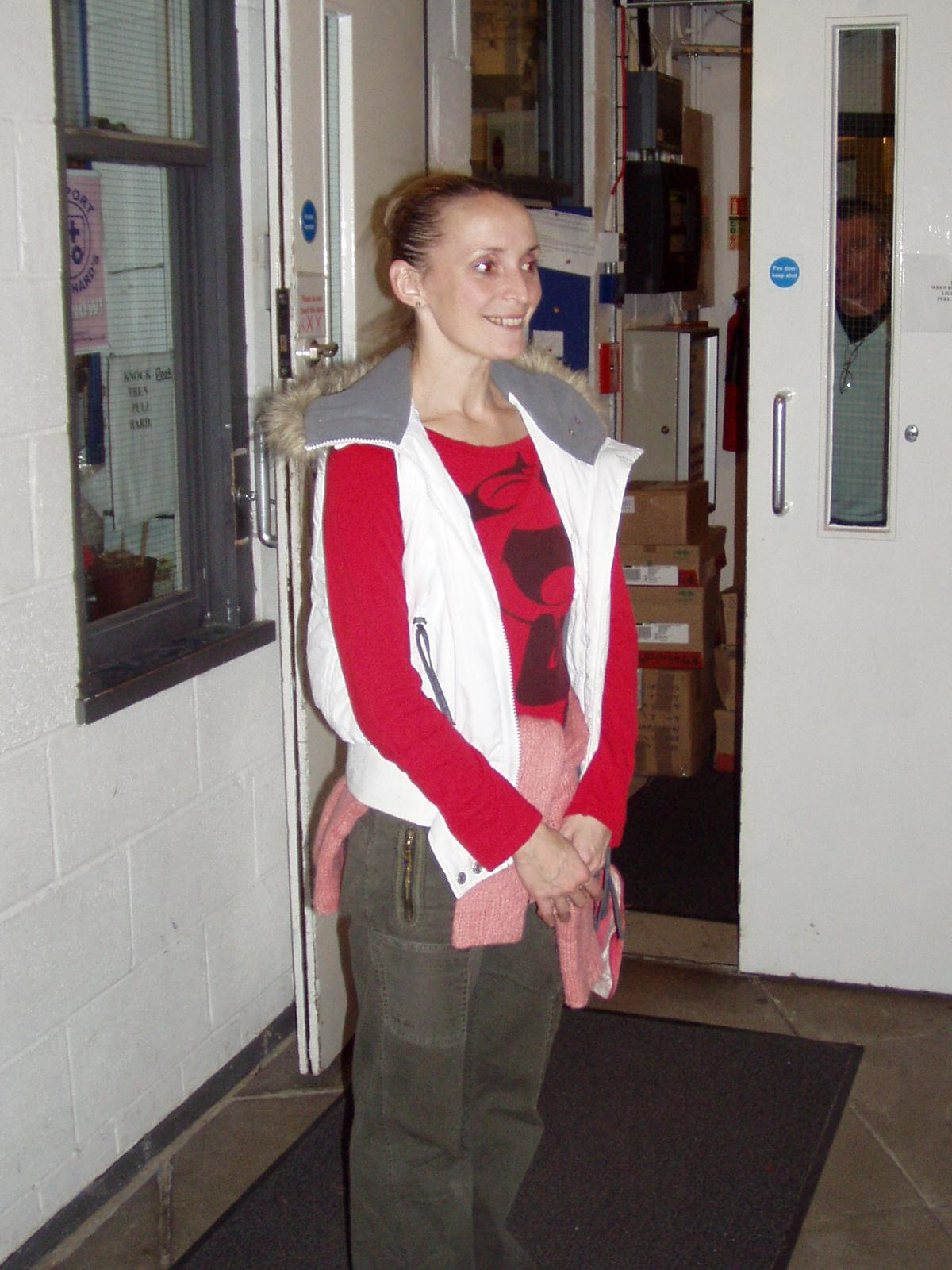
Anna Podlesnaya poses at the stage door after a Saint Petersburg Ballet Theatre 2007 production of The Nutcracker.

Anna Podesnaya (born 13 August 1970 in Leningrad) is a Russian ballerina.

== Education ==
In 1988 she graduated summa cum laude from the Vaganova Choreographic School of Leningrad in the class of Lyudila Safronova and Agrippina Vaganova. She then joined the Saint Petersburg State Academy Ballet Theatre, directed by Askold Makarov. In 2000 she joined the Konstantin Tachkin's St Petersburg Ballet Theatre, becoming a principal dancer in the 2003/04 season.

== Career and repertory ==
Odette/Odile (Swan Lake), Clara and Sugar Plum Fairy (The Nutcracker), Pas de deux and Giselle (Giselle), Princess Florina and Aurora (The Sleeping Beauty), Phrygia (Spartacus), Seventh and Eleventh Waltzes (Les Sylphides).

Currently she works as a ballet instructor at Vaganova Academy of Russian Ballet with such instructors as Alla Shelest, Alla Osipenko, Lyudmila Kunakova, Ninel Petrova, and Ludmila Safronova.
