= Roman Ovchinnikov =

Russian footballer

Personal information
- Full name: Roman Konstantinovich Ovchinnikov
- Date of birth: 5 February 1987 (age 39)
- Place of birth: Leningrad, Soviet Union
- Height: 1.82 m (5 ft 11 1/2 in)
- Position: Forward

Youth career
- DYuSSh Smena-Zenit

Senior career*
Years	Team	Apps	(Gls)
2003–2004	Zenit Saint Petersburg	0	(0)
2005	Petrotrest	5	(0)
2005	BATE Borisov	1	(0)
- * Club domestic league appearances and goals

Roman Konstantinovich Ovchinnikov (Russian: Роман Константинович Овчинников; born 5 February 1987) is a former Russian football forward.

== Career ==
Ovchinnikov spent two seasons with Zenit U-21 team. He started 2005 year playing for Russian First Division club Petrotrest. In the midseason he moved to Belarusian BATE, where he once appeared for the first team.

After leaving BATE, Ovchinnikov received a serious injury while on trial with Dinamo of Saint Petersburg that kept him out of football for 1,5 years. He had never found himself a new club and retired in 2010. He played for several more years on amateur (fifth-tier and below) levels.
