= Anna Shabanova =

Russian physician (1842–1932)

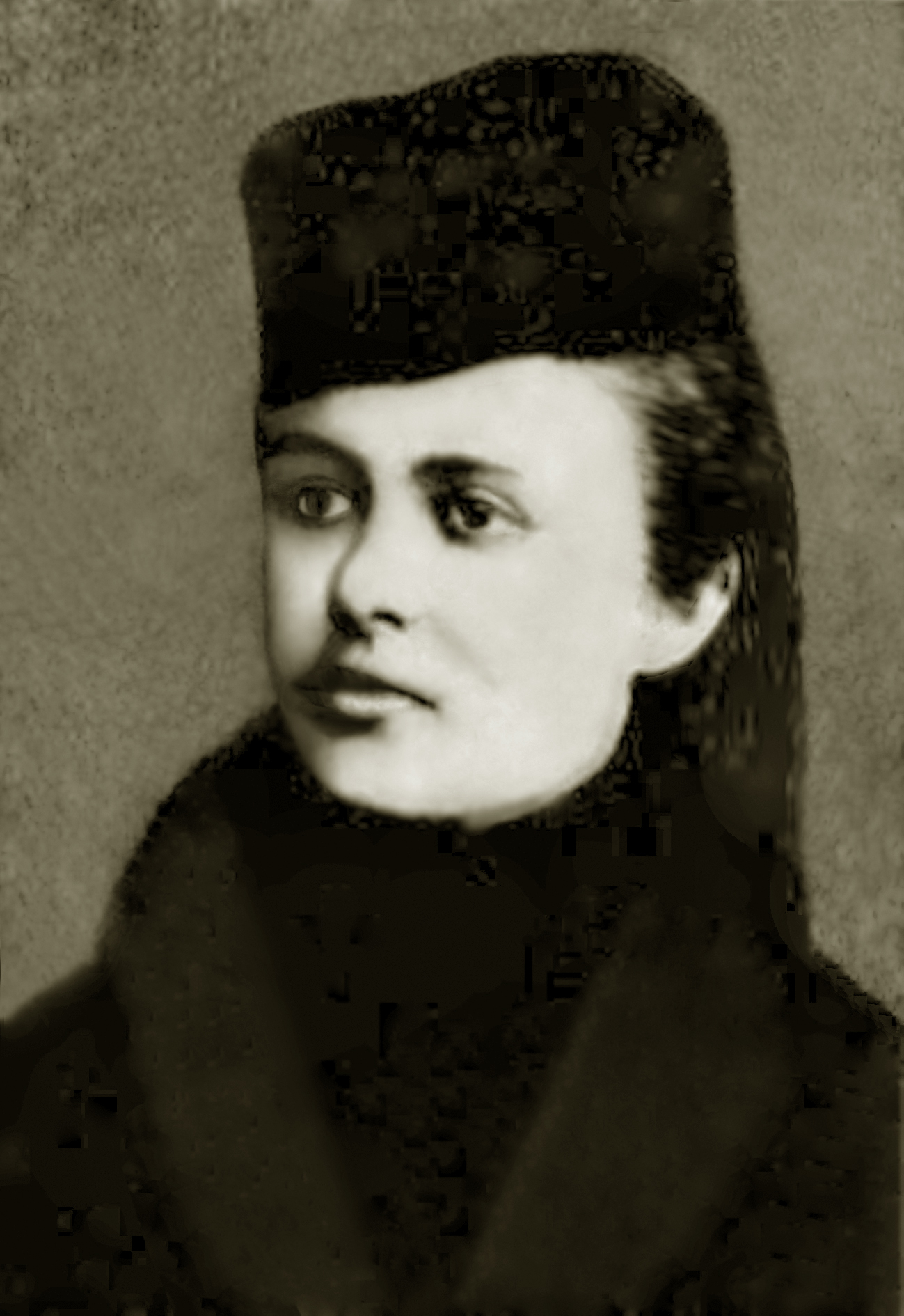
Anna Shabanova, young

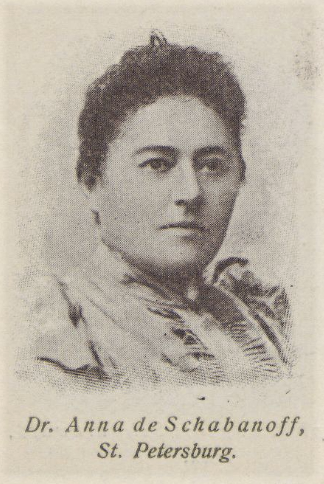
Dr. Anna Shabanova, c. 1904

Anna Nikolaevna Shabanova (1848 in Shabanovo, Smolensky Uyezd, Smolensk Governorate, Russian Empire – 1932 in Leningrad, Soviet Union) was a pioneering Russian woman pediatrician and women's rights activist.

== Life ==
Anna Shabanova was the daughter of a wealthy landowner. When still a young woman she joined a radical political group which was critical of the Czar and in 1865 was arrested and imprisoned for six months.

Shabanova wanted to become a doctor but was unable to study in Russia where there was no training available to women. She moved to Helsinki, Finland to study there but returned in 1873 when a new women's medical course started in St. Petersburg.

Shabanova became a doctor of medicine after earning her degree at the Higher Women's Medical Courses of Saint Petersburg in 1878. She was one of the first women in Russia to qualify as a doctor. She went on to spend her entire career at the Ol'denburg Children's Hospital in Saint Petersburg, where she eventually became the senior hospital physician.

Shabanova established the Society for the Treatment of Chronically Ill Children and opened children's clinics in Gatchina (1882) and Vindava (1900).

She also founded the Zhenskoe Vzaimno-Blagotvoritel'noe Obshchestvo (Russian Women's Mutual Philanthropic Society) in 1895. Her participation in the Russian women's movement led to her taking several positions as a leader in international women's organizations. Shabanova received many accolades for her professional work, including the Russian Hero of Labor medal in 1928 and membership of the American Academy of Social Sciences in Philadelphia in 1929.

== Political views ==
From 1905 she steered the Russian Women's Mutual Philanthropic Society into politics by urging its members to campaign for women's representation in any future national assembly that might be formed. She conceived and organised the first All-Russian Women's Congress on December 10 to 16 1908 which went ahead under the watchful eye of police censors. Her attempts at the conference to found a national women's organisation and to affiliate to international ones were blocked by socialist groups who saw them as weakening class solidarity by forming links across the classes.

She was highly critical of Czar Nicholas II and the autocratic monarchy. She wanted Russia to have universal suffrage and wanted the Russian government to allow freedom of expression and put an end to political censorship of newspapers and books.
