= Alexey Stadler =

Russian cellist

Alexey Stadler (born 13 June 1991, Leningrad, Russian SFSR, Soviet Union) is a Russian cellist.

Born into a family of musicians, Stadler began to play the cello at age 4. He began his studies with Alexey Lazko and continued his education at the Rimsky-Korsakov College of Music in St. Petersburg. Stadler studied with Wolfgang Emanuel Schmidt at the Hochschule für Musik Franz Liszt in Weimar and had scholarships from the Oscar und Vera Ritter-Stiftung and the Alfred Töpfer Stiftung in Hamburg. He has also participated in cello masterclasses with David Geringas, Frans Helmerson, Lynn Harrell, and Steven Isserlis.

Stadler has received several awards in Russia, including the national titles 'Young Talent' (2008, 2009 and 2010) and 'Hope of Russia' (2008, 2009). In 2012, Stadler won the grand prize of the TONALi Competition in Hamburg.

Stadler made his concerto debut in London in December 2014. He made his debut at the BBC Proms on 25 August 2016 on one half-day's notice, substituting for an indisposed Truls Mørk.

Stadler resides in Germany. He has recorded works for cello and piano, with pianist Karina Sposobina, for the Northern Flowers label.
