= Andrey Chernigovsky =

Russian footballer and manager

Personal information
- Full name: Andrey Vasilyevich Chernigovsky
- Date of birth: 10 February 1983 (age 43)
- Place of birth: Bratsk, Irkutsk Oblast, Russian SFSR
- Height: 1.71 m (5 ft 7 1/2 in)
- Positions: Midfielder; defender

Youth career
- Olimpiya Bratsk

Senior career*
Years	Team	Apps	(Gls)
2002–2003	FC Saturn-RenTV Ramenskoye	0	(0)
2004–2006	FC Saturn Yegoryevsk	67	(5)
2007–2008	FC Dynamo Bryansk	41	(4)
2009	FC MVD Rossii Moscow	13	(1)
2009	FC Gazovik Orenburg	7	(1)
2010	FC Olimp Fryazino		
2011	FC Volga Tver	32	(4)

Managerial career
- 2011–2013: Zhuravlyov Academy
- 2013–2015: FC Strogino Moscow (academy)
- 2014–2015: FC Kvazar Moscow
- 2015: FC Mika
- 2017–2018: FC Znamya Truda Orekhovo-Zuyevo (assistant)
- 2018: FC Dynamo Stavropol (assistant)
- * Club domestic league appearances and goals

Andrey Vasilyevich Chernigovsky (Russian: Андре́й Васи́льевич Черни́говский; born 10 February 1983) is a Russian professional association football manager and a former player.

== Club career ==
He played 3 seasons in the Russian Football National League for FC Dynamo Bryansk and FC MVD Rossii Moscow.
