= Ilyas Vasipov =

Russian journalist (1974–2016)

Ilyas Vasipov (1974–2016) was a Russian journalist, who worked for VGTRK, NTV, and 5TV. He "influenced a whole generation of St. Petersburg journalists".

Vasipov, according to his own words, before coming to television, published in Smena magazine in the late 80's.

In 1998–2001, he worked for the NTV channel. Vasipov was in charge of the show Today in Saint-Petersburg (Russian: Сегодня в СПб) and was the editor-in-chief of Segodnyachko-Piter. Later he worked on the information and analytical show Petersburg's hour (Russian: Петербургский час), shot special reports for TRK Petersburg, and was engaged in documentary projects for it.

In 2002–2004, Vasipov worked in Moscow for the Russia TV channel. He is one of the creators of the show Vesti. On Duty In 2004, Vasipov returned to St. Petersburg, where he worked for 5TV. He was editor-in-chief of Pulse newspaper.

On June 19, 2016, Vasipov was found dead in his apartment with no signs of violent death. He died of cardiopulmonary failure.

== 999 newspaper ==
In 2006–2008, Vasipov published a monthly newspaper 999 "for drinking intellectuals". The newspaper was published in A3 format and covered world and city news humorously. The name was due to the fact that a print edition with a circulation of less than 1,000 copies did not require official registration under Russian law.

The first issue was published on July 13, 2006. The next day, 999 was registered after all. A year later, the newspaper had a circulation of 5,000 copies.

"999" touched on alcohol, music, literature, art, gender psychology, and other topics.

Regular contributors included Alexander Lushin of Prepinaki music band, punk journalist Vadim Sharapov, and Anatoly Gunitsky of Aquarium. Italian and American journalists participated in the creation of the newspaper. Among those who gave interviews were Boris Grebenshchikov and writer Tatyana Moskvina.

The newspaper was first distributed free of charge in a narrow circle of establishments, including the clubs Platform and Griboedov. Then publishing house Woe from Wit (after the name of the classic tragedy) was established and there were plans (unrealized) to bring the circulation to 10,000 copies.

The last issue came out in June 2008.
