= Yuri Busse =

Russian artistic gymnast

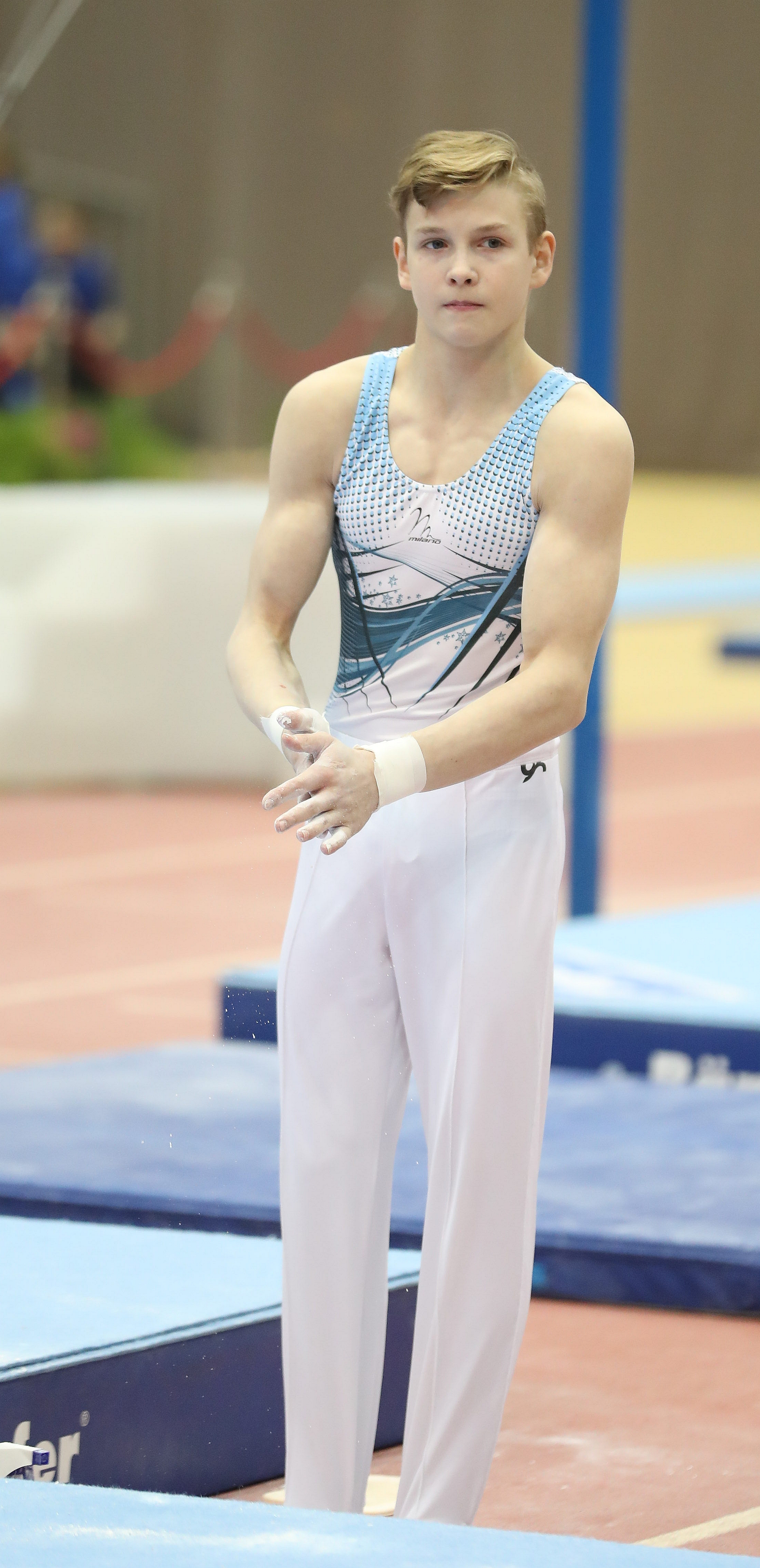
- Busse at the Austrian Future Cup in 2018

Personal information
- Full name: Yuri Sergeevich Busse
- Alternative name: Iurii Busse
- Nickname: Yura
- Born: 16 July 2001 (age 25) Saint Petersburg, Russia

Gymnastics career
- Discipline: Men's artistic gymnastics
- Country represented: Russia; (2014-present)
- Head coach: S. Petrov
- Assistant coach: S. Yachmenev

Yuri Sergeevich Busse (Russian: Юрий Сергеевич Буссе, born 16 July 2001 in Saint Petersburg, Russia) is a Russian artistic gymnast. On the national level, he is a three-time 2015, 2016 and 2018 Russian Junior National All-around silver medalist.

== Career ==
=== Junior ===
In 2014, Busse competed at the Russian Championships for the Youth Age where he came first in the all-around. At the "Hope of Russia" competition, he finished 4th in the all-around. In 2015, at the Summer Spartakiada Games Busse won bronze in all-around; in the apparatus he finished 1st in floor and vault, second in horizontal bar and parallel bars, 8th in pommels, and 5th in rings.

In 2016, Busse won silver in all-around at the 2016 Russian Junior Nationals behind Sergei Naidin, he also took third in team event, and in the apparatus finals; he won gold in horizontal bar and parallel bars, second in vault and rings, third in pommel horse and 7th in floor exercise.

In 2017 on July 23–30, Busse competed at the 2017 European Youth Olympic Festival in Győr, Hungary were team Russia won gold (together with Sergei Naidin and Aleksandr Kartsev). He took silver medal in the all-around and qualified to four apparatus finals finishing second in floor exercise and rings, 8th in pommel horse and 6th in horizontal bar.

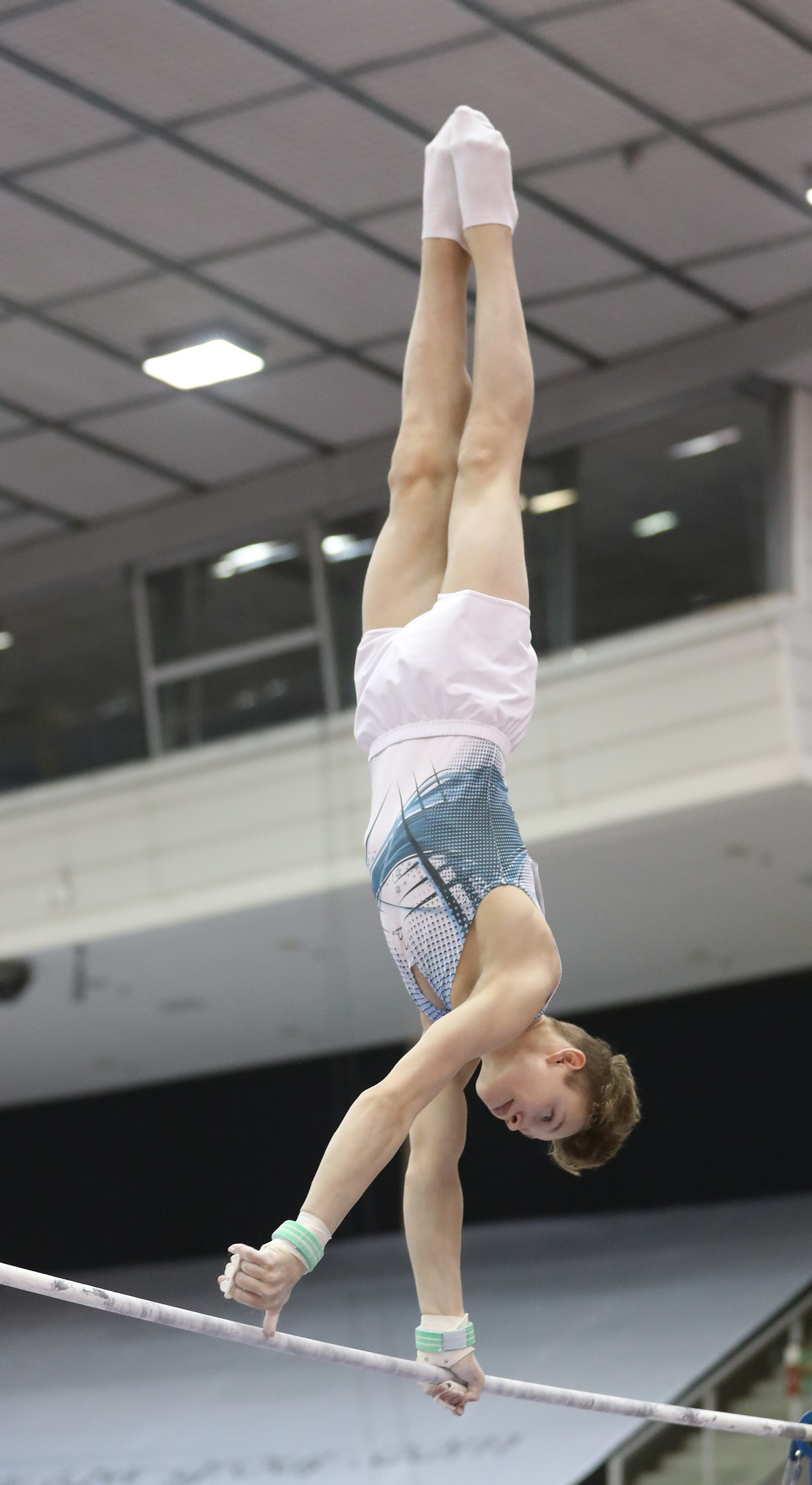
Busse on horizontal bar at the Austrian Future Cup in 2018

In 2018, Busse won the qualifying competition in artistic gymnastics ahead of teammate Sergei Naidin held in Baku, Azerbaijan; securing Russia a top quota for the 2018 Summer Youth Olympics. On July 4–7, at the 2018 Russian Junior National Championships, Busse won silver in all-around behind Sergei Naidin, in the event finals: he won gold in horizontal bars, silver in floor, bronze medals in vault and rings.
