= Tatyana Chernigovskaya =

Soviet and Russian psychologist (born 1947)

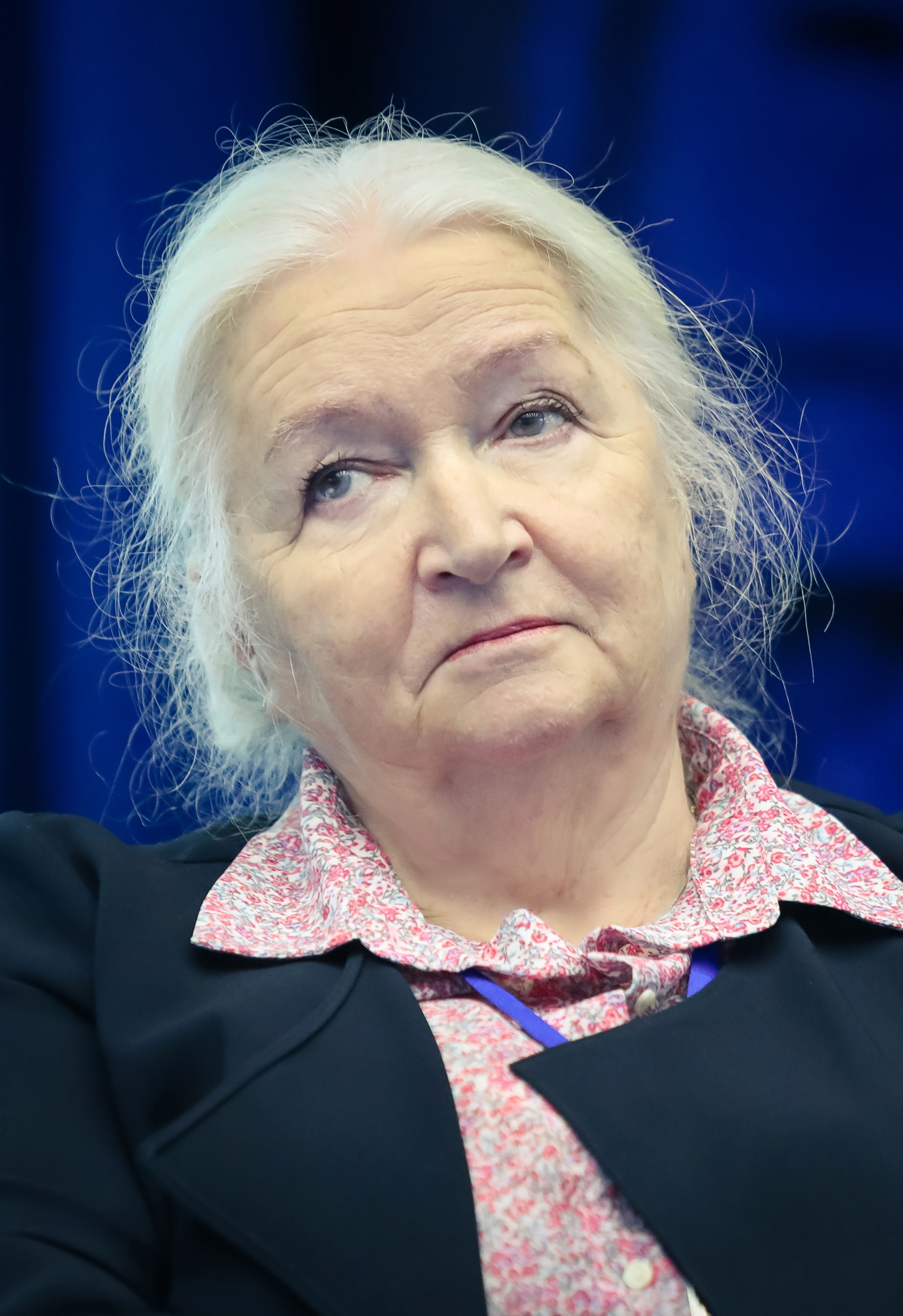
- Tatiana Chernigovskaya in 2019.
- Born: February 7, 1947; Leningrad, USSR
- Education: St. Petersburg State University
- Awards: 2010 Honored Worker of Science
- Scientific career
- Fields: Neuroscience; Psycholinguistics; Theory of mind

Tatyana Vladimirovna Chernigovskaya (Russian: Татья́на Влади́мировна Черни́говская; Born on 7 February 1947 in Leningrad, USSR) is a Soviet and Russian scientist in the field of neuroscience, psycholinguistics and theory of mind, a Honored Worker of Science (2010). On her initiative in 2000 was first open training specialization "Psycholinguistics" (in General Linguistics Department of St. Petersburg State University Faculty of Philology), Member of the Council on Science and Education under President of the Russian Federation.

== Biography ==
Chernigovskaya was born in Leningrad. She graduated from the department of English philology of philological faculty of Leningrad State University. She specialized in the field of experimental phonetics. Until 1998, she worked at the Institute of Evolutionary Physiology and Biochemistry.

In 1977 she defended her Candidate of Sciences thesis, and in 1993 her doctoral dissertation on "The evolution of linguistic and cognitive function: physiological and neurolinguistic aspects". She is a professor at the Faculty of Liberal Arts and Sciences and the Faculty of Philology of the Saint Petersburg State University.

She is engaged in experimental and clinical studies of the mental lexicon of Russian speakers.

Her major research interests are the cerebral basis for linguistic and cognitive functions; artificial intelligence; language evolution, acquisition and pathology; analytical philosophy.

== Activity ==
She teaches at St. Petersburg State University, and has been an invited lecturer in many European and North American Universities.

She also hosted a series of television programs on the "Culture" channel - "Звёздное небо мышления", "Let's show a mirror to the nature ..." and "Petersburg - Fifth Channel" - "Night", heading "Intellect".

== Awards ==
On 9 January 2010, the President of the Russian Federation awarded her the honorary title "Honored Worker of Science".

=== Memberships ===
- Member of the Norwegian Academy of Science and Letters (since 2006).
- Honorary member of the Semiotic Society of Finland.
- President of Russian Association for Cognitive Studies (2008-2010).
- Honorary Scientist of Russian Federation.
- Honorary Scholar of Higher Education of Russia.

== Publications ==
She has more than 300 publications in Russian and foreign journals.
