= Christian Friedrich von Völkner =

German translator and historian (1728–1796)

Christian Friedrich von Völkner (26 July 1728 – 3 October 1796) was a German translator and historian who worked in Russia (1747–1796).

== Life ==
Völkner was born in Halle as the son of draftsman August Völkner. He was orphaned early and was taken into the care of the Francke Foundations. In 1747 he came to Saint Petersburg in Russia and worked in the Russian Academy of Sciences, the Governing Senate, the Imperial Academy of Arts and the Mining School. Völkner achieved the rank of a Collegiate Councillor and thus the hereditary Russian nobility. As a result, he and his descendants carried the nobility predicate "von" in their names. He died in Saint Petersburg in 1796.

== Works ==
Völkner's best-known writings and translations include:

- Message from the Ayukish Kalmyks (translated from Swedish, published in Gerhard Friedrich Müller's Collection of Russian History, Volume IV, No. 4, 1760)
- Speech at the funeral of Ambrose of Moscow (murdered during the Moscow plague riots); held at the Donskoy Monastery, October 4, 1771 (translated from Russian, St. Petersburg, 1771)
- Historical drama based on Shakespear's pattern, without retaining the usual art rules of the theatre, from Rurik's life; 2nd Russian edition with annotations by Major General Boltin (translated from Russian, St. Petersburg, 1792)
- Sketch of the first and second epoch of a history of the Russians (excerpts from the introduction were published in the Allgemeiner Litterarischer Anzeiger in 1796 (No. 41) and 1797 (No. 72–74))
