= Vladimir Suleimanov =

Russian footballer

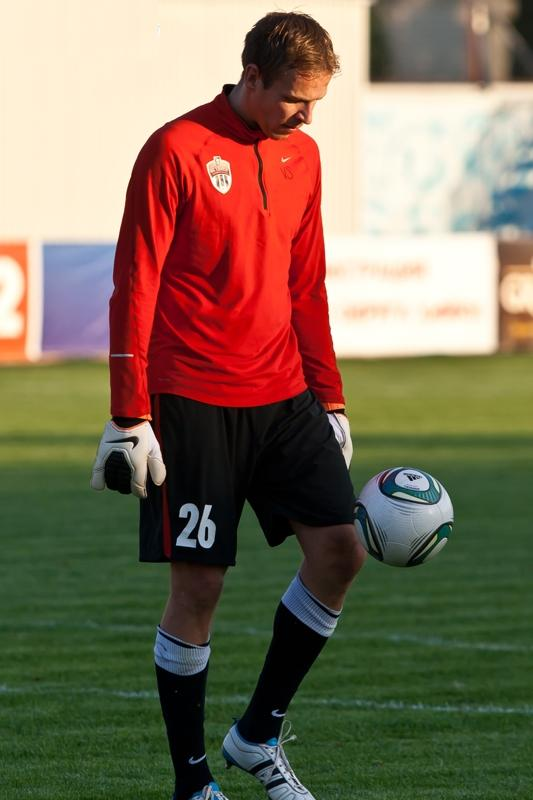

Personal information
- Full name: Vladimir Vitalyevich Suleimanov
- Date of birth: 21 January 1985 (age 41)
- Place of birth: Leningrad, Soviet Union
- Height: 1.90 m (6 ft 3 in)
- Position: Goalkeeper

Youth career
- SDYuSShOR Sestroretsk
- Smena St. Petersburg

Senior career*
Years	Team	Apps	(Gls)
2002	Zenit Saint Petersburg	0	(0)
2003	Vityaz-2 Podolsk		
2004–2005	Dinamo Minsk	1	(0)
2005	Vostok	14	(0)
2007	Rubin-2 Kazan	19	(0)
2008–2009	Khimki	0	(0)
2009	Smena-Zenit Saint Petersburg	28	(0)
2010	Sever Murmansk	22	(0)
2011–2012	Khimki	0	(0)
2013–2017	Odintsovo		
- * Club domestic league appearances and goals

Vladimir Vitalyevich Suleimanov (Russian: Владимир Витальевич Сулейманов; born 21 January 1985) is a former Russian professional footballer.

== Club career ==
Suleimanov played for FC Dinamo Minsk of Belarus against the Estonian club Levadia Tallinn in the group stage of the Commonwealth of Independent States Cup in 2005.

== Honours ==
- Belarusian Premier League champion: 2004.
