= 2014 World Artistic Gymnastics Championships – Men's qualification =

The men's qualification rounds at the 2014 World Artistic Gymnastics Championships took place on October 3–4, 2014 in the Guangxi Gymnasium in Nanning.

== Team Qualification ==
Rank	Team	Floor (gymnastics)	Pommel horse	Rings (gymnastics)	Vault (gymnastics)	Parallel bars	Horizontal bar	Total
1	China	61.398 (3)	58.106 (6)	61.365 (2)	60.915 (1)	62.182 (1)	58.732 (1)	362.698
1	Cheng Ran	15.433	14.266	14.666	15.333	15.533	14.400	362.698
1	Deng Shudi	15.466	14.566	15.133	15.216	15.683	14.566	362.698
1	Lin Chaopan	15.366	14.341	14.133	15.233	15.300	13.966	362.698
1	Liu Yang	13.333	-	15.933	14.400	-	-	362.698
1	You Hao	-	14.933	15.633	-	15.500	14.600	362.698
1	Zhang Chenglong	15.133	-	-	15.133	15.466	15.166	362.698
2	Japan	62.882 (1)	58.840 (3)	60.532 (4)	60.357 (2)	61.766 (3)	57.232 (4)	361.609
2	Kohei Kameyama	-	14.300	14.33	-	-	13.300	361.609
2	Ryohei Kato	15.833	13.833	14.900	14.866	15.533	14.366	361.609
2	Shogo Nonomura	15.216	14.866	15.066	14.833	15.200	13.400	361.609
2	Kenzo Shirai	16.033	-	-	15.258	15.066	-	361.609
2	Yusuke Tanaka	15.133	14.508	15.300	14.600	15.700	14.266	361.609
2	Kōhei Uchimura	15.800	15.166	15.266	15.400	15.333	15.200	361.609
3	United States	60.998 (4)	59.598 (1)	61.266 (3)	60.133 (4)	62.099 (2)	56.299 (7)	360.393
3	Jacob Dalton	15.466	-	15.400	15.133	15.266	14.300	360.393
3	Danell Leyva	-	14.566	-	14.700	15.900	13.600	360.393
3	Sam Mikulak	14.900	14.933	14.966	15.100	14.133	13.633	360.393
3	Alexander Naddour	15.366	15.633	15.233	13.633	-	-	360.393
3	John Orozco	14.866	14.400	15.133	-	15.400	14.700	360.393
3	Donnell Whittenburg	15.266	14.466	15.500	15.200	15.533	13.666	360.393
4	United Kingdom	60.399 (5)	59.473 (2)	59.432 (5)	60.266 (3)	59.157 (7)	58.466 (2)	357.193
4	Daniel Keatings	15.000	15.333	13.933	14.400	14.633	14.166	357.193
4	Daniel Purvis	15.433	14.641	14.433	14.966	15.133	14.100	357.193
4	Kristian Thomas	15.000	-	-	15.200	-	14.800	357.193
4	Courtney Tulloch	-	13.833	15.700	-	14.00	-	357.193
4	Max Whitlock	13.766	15.233	14.533	15.200	14.866	14.600	357.193
4	Nile Wilson	14.966	14.266	14.766	14.900	14.525	14.900	357.193
5	Russia	61.748 (2)	55.432 (15)	61.498 (1)	60.015 (5)	60.466 (4)	57.798 (3)	356.957
5	Denis Ablyazin	16.066	-	15.866	15.266	-	-	356.957
5	David Belyavskiy	15.400	15.233	14.800	15.316	15.133	14.866	356.957
5	Nikita Ignatyev	15.316	12.833	15.566	14.900	14.700	12.633	356.957
5	Nikolai Kuksenkov	14.966	13.866	15.266	14.533	15.400	15.133	356.957
5	Vladislav Poliashov	14.400	10.833	14.566	13.800	15.233	13.766	356.957
5	Ivan Stretovich	-	13.500	-	-	14.400	14.033	356.957
6	Germany	59.800 (8)	53.932 (21)	58.840 (8)	59.466 (9)	60.340 (5)	56.265 (8)	348.643
6	Andreas Bretschneider	15.000	-	14.633	14.900	15.266	13.900	348.643
6	Lukas Dauser	-	13.000	-	14.600	15.133	13.566	348.643
6	Fabian Hambüchen	15.300	12.833	14.866	15.033	15.333	14.366	348.643
6	Philipp Herder	14.600	11.966	14.466	-	14.608	-	348.643
6	Helge Liebrich	13.800	13.766	14.333	14.933	-	13.933	348.643
6	Andreas Toba	14.900	14.333	14.875	14.466	14.000	14.066	348.643
7	Brazil	59.832 (7)	54.765 (18)	59.149 (6)	59.924 (6)	57.998 (10)	56.432 (6)	348.100
7	Junior Barretto	-	14.200	14.400	-	14.700	14.000	348.100
7	Lucas De Souza	14.433	12.433	14.300	14.366	14.366	14.133	348.100
7	Diego Hypólito	15.900	11.866	-	14.600	13.866	13.133	348.100
7	Arthur Zanetti	14.266	-	15.716	14.833	-	-	348.100
7	Arthur Oyakawa	15.233	13.566	14.133	15.100	13.666	14.433	348.100
7	Sergio Sasaki	13.900	14.566	13.733	15.391	15.066	13.866	348.100
8	Switzerland	57.899 (15)	58.432 (5)	56.665 (20)	57.865 (15)	59.066 (9)	56.066 (10)	345.993
8	Christian Baumann	14.166	14.566	13.933	14.633	13.133	14.000	345.993
8	Pascal Bucher	-	14.766	-	14.200	15.333	13.900	345.993
8	Benjamin Gischard	14.433	14.200	14.333	14.666	-	-	345.993
8	Oliver Hegi	13.733	14.900	14.133	14.366	15.033	14.666	345.993
8	Kevin Rossi	14.400	-	13.933	-	14.300	13.233	345.993
8	Eddy Yusof	14.900	13.400	14.266	13.900	14.400	13.500	345.993

== Individual all-around Qualifications ==
Although Nile Wilson of Great Britain qualified ahead of teammate Max Whitlock, Wilson withdrew from the all-around final due to an wrist injury. Whitlock took his place in the all-around competition.

Rank	Gymnast	Nation	Floor (gymnastics)	Pommel horse	Rings (gymnastics)	Vault (gymnastics)	Parallel bars	Horizontal bar	Total	Qual.
1	Kōhei Uchimura	Japan	15.800	15.166	15.266	15.400	15.333	15.200	92.165	Q
2	David Belyavskiy	Russia	15.400	15.233	14.800	15.316	15.133	14.866	90.748	Q
3	Deng Shudi	China	15.466	14.566	15.333	15.216	15.683	14.566	90.630	Q
4	Donnell Whittenburg	United States	15.266	14.466	15.500	15.200	15.533	13.666	89.631	Q
5	Cheng Ran	China	15.433	14.266	14.666	15.333	15.533	14.400	89.631	Q
6	Yusuke Tanaka	Japan	15.133	14.508	15.300	14.600	15.700	14.266	89.507	Q
7	Ryohei Kato	Japan	15.833	13.833	14.900	14.866	15.533	14.366	89.331	-
8	Oleg Verniaiev	Ukraine	14.700	13.366	15.166	15.466	15.766	14.766	89.230	Q
9	Nikolai Kuksenkov	Russia	14.966	13.866	15.266	14.533	15.400	15.133	89.164	Q
10	Daniel Purvis	Great Britain	15.433	14.641	14.433	14.966	15.133	14.100	88.706	Q
11	Shogo Nonomura	Japan	15.216	14.866	15.066	14.833	15.200	13.400	88.581	-
12	Chaopan Lin	China	15.366	14.341	14.133	15.233	15.300	13.966	88.339	-
13	Nile Wilson	Great Britain	14.966	14.266	14.766	14.900	14.525	14.900	88.323	-
14	Max Whitlock	Great Britain	13.766	15.233	14.533	15.200	14.866	14.600	88.198	Q
15	Andrey Likhovitskiy	Belarus	14.966	14.266	14.766	14.900	14.525	14.900	87.840	Q
16	Fabian Hambüchen	Germany	15.300	12.833	14.866	15.033	15.333	14.366	87.731	Q
17	Sam Mikulak	United States	14.900	14.933	14.966	15.100	14.133	13.633	87.665	Q
18	Sergio Sasaki Junior	Brazil	13.900	14.566	14.733	15.391	15.066	13.866	87.522	Q
19	Daniel Keatings	Great Britain	15.000	15.333	13.933	14.400	14.633	14.166	87.465	-
20	Petro Pakhnyuk	Azerbaijan	15.000	14.033	14.300	14.933	15.333	13.733	87.332	Q
21	Oliver Hegi	Switzerland	13.733	14.900	14.133	14.366	15.033	14.666	86.831	Q
22	Andreas Toba	Germany	14.900	14.333	14.875	14.466	14.000	14.066	86.640	Q
23	Cyril Tommasone	France	14.000	15.500	14.000	14.400	14.900	13.466	86.266	Q
24	Alexander Shatilov	Israel	15.300	13.833	13.700	14.533	14.133	14.633	86.132	Q
25	Arthur Oyakawa Mariano	Brazil	15.233	13.566	14.133	15.100	13.666	14.433	86.131	Q
26	Nikita Ignatyev	Russia	15.316	12.833	15.566	14.900	14.700	12.633	85.948	-
27	Jossimar Calvo	Colombia	14.433	14.033	14.266	14.833	13.466	14.866	85.897	Q
28	Cristian Bățagă	Romania	14.766	14.433	14.833	14.533	14.191	13.133	85.889	Q
29	Lee Hyeok Jung	South Korea	14.600	14.633	13.766	14.233	14.333	13.866	85.431	Q
30	Ludovico Edalli	Italy	14.333	14.433	14.033	14.366	14.266	13.833	85.264	Q
31	Ferhat Arıcan	Turkey	14.400	13.500	14.000	14.733	15.266	12.966	84.865	R
32	Mykyta Yermak	Ukraine	14.466	13.800	14.033	14.300	14.633	13.400	84.632	R
33	Andrei Muntean	Romania	14.933	13.400	15.266	14.033	13.666	13.300	84.598	R
34	Paolo Principi	Italy	14.733	14.366	13.733	14.400	13.566	13.800	84.598	R
35	Christian Baumann	Switzerland	5.600 14.166 ﴾104﴿	5.800 14.566 ﴾28﴿	5.100 13.933 ﴾107﴿	5.200 14.633 ﴾53﴿	5.900 13.133 ﴾171﴿	6.200 14.000 ﴾36﴿	84.431	
36	Dzmitry Barkalau	Belarus	6.400 13.366 ﴾190﴿	5.800 13.966 ﴾62﴿	6.000 14.200 ﴾79﴿	5.200 14.566 ﴾62﴿	5.700 14.366 ﴾59﴿	6.500 13.966 ﴾39﴿	84.43	
37	Naoya Tsukahara	Australia	4.700 13.800 ﴾147﴿	5.500 13.966 ﴾61﴿	5.900 14.200 ﴾78﴿	5.200 14.133 ﴾127﴿	6.000 14.666 ﴾45﴿	5.300 13.633 ﴾60﴿	84.398	
38	Eddy Yusof	Switzerland	6.300 14.900 ﴾42﴿	5.100 13.400 ﴾105﴿	5.500 14.266 ﴾73﴿	6.000 13.900 ﴾149﴿	6.200 14.400 ﴾58﴿	5.500 13.500 ﴾77﴿	84.366	
39	Oleg Stepko	Azerbaijan	5.900 14.400 ﴾85﴿	6.400 14.900 ﴾17﴿	5.500 14.000 ﴾100﴿	5.600 13.266 ﴾215﴿	6.700 15.208 ﴾23﴿	5.900 12.566 ﴾170﴿	84.34	
40	Jackson Payne	Canada	5.600 14.200 ﴾102﴿	6.300 14.466 ﴾35﴿	5.300 14.033 ﴾93﴿	4.400 13.266 ﴾215﴿	6.200 14.066 ﴾84﴿	6.700 14.300 ﴾24﴿	84.331	
41	Ruben Lopez	Spain	6.200 13.900 ﴾138﴿	5.600 13.600 ﴾89﴿	6.400 15.000 ﴾28﴿	5.600 14.600 ﴾56﴿	6.100 13.066 ﴾177﴿	5.800 13.900 ﴾42﴿	84.066	
42	Lucas Bitencourt	Brazil	6.100 14.433 ﴾79﴿	5.400 12.433 ﴾170﴿	5.700 14.300 ﴾70﴿	5.200 14.366 ﴾91﴿	6.000 14.366 ﴾60﴿	5.800 14.133 ﴾30﴿	84.031	
43	Jim Zona	France	6.000 14.700 ﴾53﴿	5.400 13.266 ﴾118﴿	5.600 14.366 ﴾64﴿	5.200 13.266 ﴾215﴿	5.900 14.700 ﴾40﴿	6.200 13.733 ﴾55﴿	84.031	
44	Artur Davtyan	Armenia	5.000 14.033 ﴾117﴿	5.700 14.566 ﴾27﴿	5.700 14.566 ﴾49﴿	5.200 14.566 ﴾62﴿	5.100 13.966 ﴾98﴿	4.800 12.333 ﴾180﴿	84.03	
45	Lee Chih-kai	Chinese Taipei	5.600 14.366 ﴾88﴿	6.200 14.166 ﴾53﴿	5.100 13.700 ﴾130﴿	5.600 14.833 ﴾38﴿	5.200 13.800 ﴾115﴿	5.300 13.100 ﴾122﴿	83.965	
46	Maksym Semiankiv	Ukraine	5.500 14.233 ﴾98﴿	6.000 14.333 ﴾43﴿	5.300 12.833 ﴾205﴿	4.400 13.666 ﴾168﴿	5.800 14.566 ﴾53﴿	6.200 14.166 ﴾29﴿	83.797	
47	Tomás González	Chile	6.500 15.266 ﴾20﴿	5.400 13.633 ﴾82﴿	5.900 14.425 ﴾61﴿	6.000 14.100 ﴾130﴿	5.900 14.433 ﴾55﴿	5.300 11.833 ﴾206﴿	83.69	
48	Casimir Schmidt	Netherlands	6.300 14.166 ﴾106﴿	5.400 13.200 ﴾124﴿	5.400 14.133 ﴾84﴿	5.600 14.700 ﴾50﴿	5.400 13.908 ﴾104﴿	5.400 13.566 ﴾68﴿	83.673	
49	Kevin Antoniotti	France	6.100 14.733 ﴾52﴿	5.500 12.666 ﴾156﴿	5.400 14.133 ﴾84﴿	5.200 14.300 ﴾101﴿	6.400 14.833 ﴾37﴿	5.700 13.000 ﴾134﴿	83.665	
50	Mikhail Koudinov	New Zealand	5.800 14.566 ﴾64﴿	5.000 13.433 ﴾103﴿	5.300 13.441 ﴾155﴿	4.800 14.066 ﴾134﴿	6.400 14.600 ﴾51﴿	5.800 13.533 ﴾73﴿	83.639	
51	Jay Hugh Smith	Canada	6.000 14.533 ﴾68﴿	5.600 13.333 ﴾114﴿	5.800 14.133 ﴾89﴿	5.600 14.533 ﴾65﴿	5.100 13.800 ﴾113﴿	5.300 13.066 ﴾126﴿	83.398	
52	Luis Rivera	Puerto Rico	6.000 14.666 ﴾56﴿	5.900 13.133 ﴾127﴿	6.100 14.200 ﴾80﴿	5.200 14.200 ﴾121﴿	5.400 13.116 ﴾172﴿	5.700 14.000 ﴾35﴿	83.315	
53	Jimmy Verbaeys	Belgium	6.100 14.400 ﴾87﴿	5.300 13.533 ﴾94﴿	4.800 13.300 ﴾170﴿	5.200 13.866 ﴾153﴿	6.200 14.233 ﴾69﴿	5.800 13.866 ﴾47﴿	83.198	
54	Artsiom Bykau	Belarus	5.400 13.200 ﴾202﴿	5.200 13.533 ﴾93﴿	5.700 14.433 ﴾58﴿	5.200 14.300 ﴾101﴿	5.600 14.133 ﴾75﴿	5.400 13.533 ﴾72﴿	83.132	
55	Paolo Ottavi	Italy	5.600 14.100 ﴾112﴿	5.000 12.966 ﴾136﴿	6.200 14.700 ﴾44﴿	4.800 13.733 ﴾161﴿	5.700 13.766 ﴾123﴿	5.900 13.733 ﴾54﴿	82.998	
56	Ahmet Onder	Turkey	5.600 14.141 ﴾108﴿	4.600 12.233 ﴾185﴿	5.100 13.966 ﴾105﴿	5.200 14.400 ﴾82﴿	6.000 14.666 ﴾45﴿	5.300 13.400 ﴾87﴿	82.806	
57	Rokas Guščinas	Lithuania	5.200 14.000 ﴾120﴿	6.300 13.300 ﴾117﴿	5.400 14.333 ﴾66﴿	4.800 13.900 ﴾149﴿	5.200 13.500 ﴾141﴿	5.300 13.633 ﴾60﴿	82.666	
58	Lee Sang-wook	South Korea	5.800 14.566 ﴾64﴿	5.900 12.700 ﴾150﴿	5.200 13.766 ﴾121﴿	5.200 14.066 ﴾134﴿	6.300 14.333 ﴾63﴿	6.100 13.233 ﴾106﴿	82.664	
59	Gustavo Simoes	Portugal	5.900 14.033 ﴾118﴿	6.200 13.833 ﴾72﴿	6.000 14.633 ﴾46﴿	5.200 14.266 ﴾109﴿	5.500 13.566 ﴾137﴿	5.300 12.300 ﴾184﴿	82.631	
60	Vladislav Poliashov	Russia	6.000 14.400 ﴾84﴿	5.100 10.833 ﴾233﴿	5.900 14.566 ﴾50﴿	5.600 13.800 ﴾157﴿	6.500 15.233 ﴾21﴿	5.800 13.766 ﴾51﴿	82.598	
61	Vid Hidvégi	Hungary	5.300 13.900 ﴾132﴿	6.600 14.966 ﴾13﴿	5.000 13.700 ﴾128﴿	4.400 13.300 ﴾213﴿	5.600 14.008 ﴾89﴿	5.400 12.700 ﴾158﴿	82.574	
62	Stian Skjerahaug	Norway	5.600 14.400 ﴾80﴿	6.000 12.366 ﴾179﴿	5.000 13.600 ﴾140﴿	5.200 14.466 ﴾72﴿	5.300 14.033 ﴾87﴿	5.300 13.466 ﴾80﴿	82.331	
63	Tomas Kuzmickas	Lithuania	6.300 15.066 ﴾27﴿	4.400 12.200 ﴾188﴿	4.700 13.466 ﴾152﴿	5.200 14.300 ﴾101﴿	5.400 14.066 ﴾81﴿	5.400 12.800 ﴾151﴿	81.898	
64	Andrew Smith	Ireland	6.000 14.633 ﴾59﴿	5.300 13.633 ﴾81﴿	4.100 12.433 ﴾218﴿	5.200 14.533 ﴾65﴿	4.900 13.433 ﴾149﴿	4.900 13.200 ﴾108﴿	81.865	
65	Javier Cervantes Quezada	Mexico	5.700 14.133 ﴾109﴿	6.000 13.633 ﴾85﴿	5.500 13.700 ﴾134﴿	5.200 14.100 ﴾130﴿	5.600 13.466 ﴾144﴿	5.400 12.800 ﴾151﴿	81.832	
66	Dávid Vecsernyés	Hungary	5.200 13.666 ﴾163﴿	5.600 13.900 ﴾64﴿	4.800 13.366 ﴾166﴿	4.400 13.566 ﴾181﴿	5.100 13.633 ﴾131﴿	6.100 13.533 ﴾74﴿	81.664	
67	Mohamed El-Saharty	Egypt	5.500 13.966 ﴾128﴿	5.400 12.733 ﴾148﴿	5.800 13.933 ﴾111﴿	5.200 14.066 ﴾134﴿	5.400 13.800 ﴾117﴿	5.500 13.033 ﴾129﴿	81.531	
68	Roberto Alvarez Serrano	Spain	6.100 14.300 ﴾93﴿	4.700 12.583 ﴾163﴿	5.000 13.466 ﴾154﴿	5.600 14.900 ﴾30﴿	5.000 12.700 ﴾201﴿	5.400 13.500 ﴾75﴿	81.449	
69	Zachary Clay	Canada	5.700 13.900 ﴾136﴿	5.800 13.933 ﴾63﴿	5.600 13.133 ﴾182﴿	5.600 13.800 ﴾157﴿	6.200 13.766 ﴾124﴿	4.900 12.900 ﴾139﴿	81.432	
70	Kieran Behan	Ireland	6.400 14.600 ﴾63﴿	3.600 11.600 ﴾210﴿	5.500 13.800 ﴾119﴿	5.200 14.233 ﴾113﴿	5.200 13.766 ﴾119﴿	4.800 13.400 ﴾85﴿	81.399	
71	Adam Babos	Hungary	5.500 13.900 ﴾134﴿	5.300 13.766 ﴾75﴿	5.500 13.933 ﴾110﴿	4.400 13.400 ﴾205﴿	5.200 13.900 ﴾106﴿	4.900 12.500 ﴾173﴿	81.399	
72	Ryan Patterson	South Africa	6.000 14.766 ﴾48﴿	4.800 12.333 ﴾180﴿	4.600 13.333 ﴾168﴿	5.200 14.400 ﴾82﴿	5.700 13.100 ﴾175﴿	5.200 13.441 ﴾82﴿	81.373	
73	Roman Kulesza	Poland	5.100 13.333 ﴾192﴿	4.900 12.600 ﴾161﴿	5.300 13.666 ﴾135﴿	5.200 14.200 ﴾121﴿	5.900 14.233 ﴾68﴿	5.400 13.300 ﴾94﴿	81.332	
74	Slavomir Michnak	Slovakia	5.400 13.866 ﴾141﴿	6.000 14.500 ﴾33﴿	4.100 12.800 ﴾207﴿	4.400 13.666 ﴾168﴿	5.200 13.200 ﴾167﴿	5.100 13.200 ﴾109﴿	81.232	
75	Nikolaos Iliopoulos	Greece	5.400 14.000 ﴾122﴿	5.600 13.600 ﴾89﴿	5.000 13.900 ﴾112﴿	4.400 13.433 ﴾199﴿	5.600 14.566 ﴾52﴿	5.200 11.633 ﴾216﴿	81.132	
76	Alexis Torres	Puerto Rico	6.000 14.433 ﴾78﴿	5.200 10.566 ﴾238﴿	6.400 14.466 ﴾57﴿	5.200 14.416 ﴾80﴿	5.800 13.966 ﴾100﴿	5.500 13.266 ﴾101﴿	81.113	
77	Severin Kranzlmueller	Austria	5.000 13.900 ﴾131﴿	5.100 13.333 ﴾111﴿	5.000 13.641 ﴾137﴿	4.400 13.266 ﴾215﴿	5.300 13.866 ﴾109﴿	5.000 13.033 ﴾128﴿	81.039	
78	Karl Oskar Kirmes	Finland	6.000 14.966 ﴾32﴿	5.100 12.666 ﴾153﴿	5.100 13.766 ﴾120﴿	4.800 14.033 ﴾141﴿	5.200 13.300 ﴾163﴿	5.500 12.233 ﴾187﴿	80.964	
79	Phuong Thanh Dinh	Vietnam	5.500 13.666 ﴾166﴿	5.500 13.533 ﴾95﴿	4.800 13.266 ﴾175﴿	4.400 13.466 ﴾193﴿	6.500 13.466 ﴾147﴿	5.400 13.300 ﴾94﴿	80.697	
80	Otabek Masharipov	Uzbekistan	5.700 13.900 ﴾136﴿	5.700 13.466 ﴾101﴿	5.000 13.500 ﴾150﴿	5.200 14.233 ﴾113﴿	5.300 12.500 ﴾208﴿	5.000 13.066 ﴾125﴿	80.665	
81	Anthony van Assche	Netherlands	4.900 13.366 ﴾188﴿	5.300 13.500 ﴾96﴿	5.900 14.500 ﴾53﴿	4.800 12.633 ﴾241﴿	5.500 13.766 ﴾122﴿	5.000 12.866 ﴾144﴿	80.631	
82	Eyal Glazer	Israel	5.200 13.066 ﴾207﴿	5.300 13.733 ﴾79﴿	5.500 14.000 ﴾100﴿	3.600 12.866 ﴾232﴿	5.400 13.600 ﴾135﴿	4.700 13.366 ﴾89﴿	80.631	
83	Lê Thanh Tùng	Vietnam	5.800 14.066 ﴾113﴿	3.900 11.733 ﴾206﴿	5.500 13.766 ﴾124﴿	5.200 14.433 ﴾76﴿	6.600 14.000 ﴾95﴿	4.700 12.600 ﴾167﴿	80.598	
84	Daan Kenis	Belgium	6.200 12.866 ﴾217﴿	5.400 11.166 ﴾222﴿	5.000 13.433 ﴾157﴿	5.600 14.900 ﴾30﴿	6.000 14.266 ﴾66﴿	6.000 13.966 ﴾38﴿	80.597	
85	Kristofer Done	New Zealand	4.800 13.666 ﴾162﴿	5.300 13.466 ﴾100﴿	4.800 13.500 ﴾149﴿	4.400 13.400 ﴾205﴿	5.500 13.358 ﴾156﴿	5.600 13.133 ﴾118﴿	80.523	
86	Bence Talas	Hungary	5.700 13.666 ﴾167﴿	5.100 13.233 ﴾121﴿	5.700 14.500 ﴾52﴿	5.200 12.600 ﴾245﴿	5.900 13.433 ﴾151﴿	6.200 13.000 ﴾135﴿	80.432	
87	Maxime Gentges	Belgium	5.300 13.700 ﴾160﴿	5.800 13.566 ﴾92﴿	5.200 13.600 ﴾143﴿	5.200 14.233 ﴾113﴿	5.600 12.700 ﴾202﴿	5.300 12.633 ﴾164﴿	80.432	
88	Phạm Phước Hưng	Vietnam	5.900 14.066 ﴾115﴿	4.800 10.633 ﴾235﴿	6.600 15.000 ﴾29﴿	4.400 13.466 ﴾193﴿	7.000 14.733 ﴾39﴿	5.100 12.400 ﴾176﴿	80.298	
89	Han Jong-hyok	North Korea	5.400 13.233 ﴾198﴿	5.200 13.233 ﴾122﴿	5.900 13.500 ﴾151﴿	4.400 13.466 ﴾193﴿	6.600 14.000 ﴾95﴿	6.300 12.766 ﴾156﴿	80.198	
90	Hsu Ping-chien	Chinese Taipei	5.300 13.766 ﴾150﴿	6.300 13.866 ﴾67﴿	5.100 13.300 ﴾172﴿	5.200 12.866 ﴾232﴿	5.200 13.600 ﴾134﴿	4.800 12.800 ﴾148﴿	80.198	
91	Marcus Conradi	Norway	5.800 14.133 ﴾110﴿	5.500 13.000 ﴾135﴿	5.300 13.766 ﴾122﴿	5.200 12.600 ﴾245﴿	4.600 13.300 ﴾162﴿	5.300 13.366 ﴾90﴿	80.165	
92	Luke Wadsworth	Australia	5.700 13.600 ﴾171﴿	5.200 12.733 ﴾147﴿	4.800 13.466 ﴾153﴿	5.200 14.300 ﴾101﴿	5.700 12.966 ﴾186﴿	4.800 13.025 ﴾130﴿	80.09	
93	Marcus Frandsen	Denmark	5.300 13.766 ﴾150﴿	5.200 13.466 ﴾99﴿	5.000 13.700 ﴾128﴿	5.200 14.416 ﴾80﴿	4.100 12.300 ﴾214﴿	4.400 12.433 ﴾175﴿	80.081	
94	Stepan Gorbachev	Kazakhstan	5.300 14.466 ﴾72﴿	5.600 13.266 ﴾119﴿	4.100 12.966 ﴾193﴿	5.200 14.466 ﴾72﴿	5.200 13.433 ﴾150﴿	4.900 11.441 ﴾223﴿	80.038	
95	Rakesh Patra	India	5.300 13.466 ﴾180﴿	4.600 12.666 ﴾152﴿	5.900 14.133 ﴾90﴿	5.200 14.133 ﴾127﴿	5.800 13.666 ﴾127﴿	4.800 11.941 ﴾198﴿	80.005	
96	Lin Yi-chieh	Chinese Taipei	5.400 13.700 ﴾161﴿	5.400 12.741 ﴾144﴿	5.200 13.533 ﴾147﴿	5.200 14.033 ﴾141﴿	4.900 13.400 ﴾152﴿	4.400 12.233 ﴾186﴿	79.64	
97	Sascha Palgen	Luxembourg	5.500 13.900 ﴾134﴿	5.300 13.400 ﴾106﴿	5.700 13.283 ﴾173﴿	5.200 13.533 ﴾185﴿	4.800 12.866 ﴾193﴿	4.100 12.633 ﴾160﴿	79.615	
98	Lukas Kranzlmueller	Austria	5.700 14.233 ﴾99﴿	3.600 10.600 ﴾236﴿	5.100 13.633 ﴾139﴿	4.400 13.433 ﴾199﴿	5.700 14.200 ﴾71﴿	5.200 13.466 ﴾79﴿	79.565	
99	Eduard Shaulov	Uzbekistan	6.100 13.766 ﴾153﴿	4.800 13.600 ﴾86﴿	3.400 11.566 ﴾234﴿	5.200 14.400 ﴾82﴿	4.700 13.100 ﴾173﴿	4.600 12.766 ﴾154﴿	79.198	
100	Adam Rzepa	Poland	5.100 13.875 ﴾140﴿	5.900 13.300 ﴾116﴿	4.200 12.733 ﴾211﴿	4.400 12.833 ﴾234﴿	4.800 13.033 ﴾179﴿	5.700 13.333 ﴾92﴿	79.107	
101	Bernardo da Costa Almeida	Portugal	5.400 13.733 ﴾157﴿	4.800 12.600 ﴾160﴿	5.000 13.600 ﴾140﴿	4.400 13.400 ﴾205﴿	5.200 13.366 ﴾155﴿	5.000 12.333 ﴾181﴿	79.032	
102	Valgard Reinhardsson	Iceland	5.800 14.433 ﴾75﴿	3.800 12.450 ﴾168﴿	4.700 12.433 ﴾219﴿	5.200 14.233 ﴾113﴿	4.400 12.566 ﴾206﴿	4.300 12.833 ﴾145﴿	78.948	
103	Dimitrios Markousis	Greece	6.300 13.433 ﴾185﴿	4.500 12.033 ﴾193﴿	5.300 14.133 ﴾83﴿	5.200 14.333 ﴾97﴿	5.400 13.766 ﴾120﴿	4.600 11.133 ﴾234﴿	78.831	
104	Mauro Martinez	Argentina	5.500 14.000 ﴾124﴿	4.700 12.166 ﴾189﴿	5.300 13.400 ﴾165﴿	5.600 13.500 ﴾190﴿	4.800 13.266 ﴾164﴿	4.400 12.358 ﴾179﴿	78.69	
105	Pietro Giachino	Norway	5.000 12.400 ﴾228﴿	5.400 12.366 ﴾176﴿	5.000 13.600 ﴾140﴿	4.400 13.166 ﴾222﴿	4.900 13.666 ﴾125﴿	5.500 13.433 ﴾84﴿	78.631	
106	Luke Wiwatowski	Australia	5.500 11.766 ﴾237﴿	4.900 13.033 ﴾133﴿	5.300 13.566 ﴾145﴿	5.200 14.333 ﴾97﴿	5.900 13.333 ﴾160﴿	5.700 12.500 ﴾174﴿	78.531	
107	Adham Alsqour	Jordan	5.500 13.266 ﴾196﴿	5.100 10.941 ﴾230﴿	5.200 13.266 ﴾177﴿	5.200 13.933 ﴾147﴿	5.900 13.833 ﴾112﴿	5.800 13.100 ﴾123﴿	78.339	
108	Andres Alejandro Arean	Argentina	5.300 13.566 ﴾174﴿	5.000 12.933 ﴾137﴿	5.000 13.066 ﴾187﴿	5.200 13.733 ﴾161﴿	5.200 12.433 ﴾210﴿	5.000 12.600 ﴾169﴿	78.331	
109	Gabriel Gan	Singapore	4.400 13.033 ﴾210﴿	5.300 14.133 ﴾55﴿	3.500 11.466 ﴾236﴿	4.400 13.466 ﴾193﴿	4.300 13.366 ﴾154﴿	4.300 12.833 ﴾145﴿	78.297	
110	Nicolás Córdoba	Argentina	5.400 13.066 ﴾206﴿	4.600 11.566 ﴾211﴿	5.200 12.983 ﴾192﴿	4.800 13.366 ﴾210﴿	5.400 14.133 ﴾74﴿	6.100 13.166 ﴾115﴿	78.28	
111	Daniel Gomez Barreno	Ecuador	5.400 11.108 ﴾243﴿	4.400 12.666 ﴾151﴿	5.400 13.800 ﴾117﴿	5.200 14.366 ﴾91﴿	5.700 13.400 ﴾153﴿	5.300 12.900 ﴾142﴿	78.24	
112	Joachim Winther	Denmark	5.000 13.500 ﴾178﴿	4.300 12.900 ﴾138﴿	5.000 12.966 ﴾196﴿	4.400 13.500 ﴾190﴿	4.300 12.766 ﴾199﴿	4.900 12.366 ﴾177﴿	77.998	
113	Kasper Holopainen	Finland	5.200 14.000 ﴾120﴿	3.400 10.933 ﴾231﴿	4.700 13.433 ﴾156﴿	5.200 14.300 ﴾101﴿	4.000 12.066 ﴾220﴿	4.700 13.200 ﴾107﴿	77.932	
114	Rodolfo Heron Bonilla Ruiz	Mexico	5.100 13.066 ﴾205﴿	5.300 13.100 ﴾129﴿	5.500 12.850 ﴾202﴿	5.200 12.633 ﴾241﴿	5.800 13.333 ﴾159﴿	5.400 12.800 ﴾151﴿	77.782	
115	Robert Tvorogal	Lithuania	5.300 11.766 ﴾238﴿	5.300 12.133 ﴾191﴿	4.800 13.633 ﴾138﴿	5.200 14.333 ﴾97﴿	6.000 14.400 ﴾56﴿	4.400 11.433 ﴾224﴿	77.698	
116	Ilya Kornev	Kazakhstan	5.400 13.733 ﴾157﴿	5.200 11.900 ﴾200﴿	5.600 12.833 ﴾206﴿	5.200 14.066 ﴾134﴿	5.700 13.466 ﴾145﴿	5.400 11.633 ﴾217﴿	77.631	
117	Odin Kalvo	Norway	5.700 12.633 ﴾221﴿	4.500 12.533 ﴾165﴿	4.400 12.633 ﴾213﴿	4.400 13.566 ﴾181﴿	4.500 13.433 ﴾148﴿	4.800 12.800 ﴾148﴿	77.598	
118	Hellal Metidji	Algeria	5.300 13.633 ﴾169﴿	5.400 13.700 ﴾80﴿	5.100 12.400 ﴾221﴿	5.200 12.833 ﴾234﴿	5.500 11.958 ﴾225﴿	5.600 13.066 ﴾127﴿	77.59	
119	David Bishop	New Zealand	5.700 14.500 ﴾69﴿	4.600 12.500 ﴾166﴿	4.000 12.475 ﴾217﴿	4.800 13.900 ﴾149﴿	3.800 12.866 ﴾191﴿	5.300 11.266 ﴾230﴿	77.507	
120	Jorge Alfredo Vega Lopez	Guatemala	6.500 14.300 ﴾94﴿	3.3	5.300 13.666 ﴾135﴿	5.600 14.900 ﴾30﴿	4.900 13.000 ﴾182﴿	4.700 11.766 ﴾211﴿	77.465	
121	Maksim Kowalenko	Poland	5.000 12.533 ﴾224﴿	4.800 12.100 ﴾192﴿	5.200 13.366 ﴾167﴿	4.400 13.433 ﴾199﴿	5.500 13.633 ﴾133﴿	5.100 12.366 ﴾178﴿	77.431	
122	Felipe Andres Pina Valenzuela	Chile	5.700 13.666 ﴾167﴿	4.000 11.466 ﴾214﴿	4.900 12.966 ﴾194﴿	5.200 14.066 ﴾134﴿	4.600 13.000 ﴾181﴿	5.200 12.266 ﴾185﴿	77.43	
123	Paata Nozadze	Georgia	5.000 13.833 ﴾143﴿	4.700 12.400 ﴾173﴿	4.200 12.833 ﴾203﴿	4.400 13.433 ﴾199﴿	4.500 13.183 ﴾168﴿	3.900 11.366 ﴾226﴿	77.048	
124	Ryang Kuk-chol	North Korea	6.000 14.066 ﴾116﴿	5.500 13.066 ﴾132﴿	5.700 13.533 ﴾148﴿	5.200 13.633 ﴾177﴿	4.800 10.500 ﴾246﴿	5.100 11.866 ﴾204﴿	76.664	
125	José Luis Fuentes	Venezuela	4.800 12.766 ﴾219﴿	5.900 12.366 ﴾178﴿	5.400 13.000 ﴾189﴿	3.600 12.600 ﴾245﴿	4.800 12.000 ﴾222﴿	6.100 13.566 ﴾71﴿	76.298	
126	Juan Sebastian Melchiori	Argentina	5.700 14.366 ﴾89﴿	4.800 11.400 ﴾215﴿	5.100 13.100 ﴾184﴿	4.800 13.466 ﴾193﴿	4.700 13.033 ﴾178﴿	5.100 10.833 ﴾241﴿	76.198	
127	Rasuljon Abdurakhimov	Uzbekistan	5.600 13.433 ﴾183﴿	4.600 11.833 ﴾202﴿	3.700 11.833 ﴾232﴿	5.200 14.233 ﴾113﴿	4.900 13.066 ﴾176﴿	4.700 11.666 ﴾214﴿	76.064	
128	Sebastian Cecot	Poland	5.200 12.433 ﴾227﴿	4.400 11.691 ﴾208﴿	5.100 13.400 ﴾164﴿	5.200 13.966 ﴾145﴿	5.200 13.000 ﴾183﴿	4.000 11.500 ﴾221﴿	75.99	
129	Aditya Rana	India	5.700 13.833 ﴾146﴿	4.200 11.266 ﴾219﴿	5.500 13.233 ﴾180﴿	5.200 13.000 ﴾229﴿	5.400 13.100 ﴾174﴿	4.500 11.233 ﴾231﴿	75.665	
130	Yordan Aleksandrov	Bulgaria	5.600 11.033 ﴾244﴿	3.800 10.166 ﴾244﴿	4.900 12.966 ﴾194﴿	4.400 13.666 ﴾168﴿	5.500 14.066 ﴾82﴿	5.500 13.733 ﴾52﴿	75.63	
131	Tarek Hamdy Shalaby	Egypt	5.300 12.266 ﴾231﴿	4.400 11.300 ﴾217﴿	5.600 12.233 ﴾224﴿	5.200 14.066 ﴾134﴿	5.100 13.200 ﴾166﴿	4.800 12.500 ﴾172﴿	75.565	
131	Jacob Dalton	United States	6.700 15.466 ﴾9﴿		6.500 15.400 ﴾12﴿	6.000 15.133 ﴾18﴿	6.500 15.266 ﴾19﴿	6.400 14.300 ﴾23﴿	75.565	
133	Kevin Crovetto	Monaco	5.500 12.900 ﴾215﴿	4.200 12.233 ﴾183﴿	4.500 13.041 ﴾188﴿	5.200 13.000 ﴾229﴿	4.600 11.766 ﴾232﴿	4.800 12.600 ﴾168﴿	75.54	
134	Christian Bruno Decidet	Chile	5.300 13.600 ﴾170﴿	3.400 10.033 ﴾247﴿	5.100 13.433 ﴾158﴿	5.200 14.233 ﴾113﴿	4.500 10.366 ﴾248﴿	5.400 13.700 ﴾56﴿	75.365	
135	Mohamed Reghib	Algeria	4.800 12.966 ﴾212﴿	4.700 12.600 ﴾159﴿	4.700 12.866 ﴾201﴿	4.400 12.133 ﴾250﴿	4.600 11.300 ﴾242﴿	6.000 13.500 ﴾78﴿	75.365	
136	Jostyn Fuenmayor Berroeta	Venezuela	5.300 11.500 ﴾240﴿	5.400 13.100 ﴾130﴿	4.600 11.333 ﴾238﴿	4.400 13.666 ﴾168﴿	5.600 13.500 ﴾142﴿	5.100 12.100 ﴾195﴿	75.199	
137	Abdulkadir Bas	Turkey	5.200 13.066 ﴾209﴿	4.300 11.366 ﴾216﴿	4.000 12.766 ﴾208﴿	4.400 13.333 ﴾212﴿	3.800 12.866 ﴾191﴿	4.200 11.800 ﴾208﴿	75.197	
138	Adickxon Gabriel Trejo Basalo	Venezuela	5.300 11.566 ﴾239﴿	4.300 11.066 ﴾228﴿	5.300 12.500 ﴾216﴿	5.200 13.866 ﴾153﴿	5.500 13.333 ﴾157﴿	5.200 12.800 ﴾150﴿	75.131	
139	Nikolay Nam	Kazakhstan	5.600 12.833 ﴾218﴿	5.000 12.000 ﴾195﴿	5.200 13.266 ﴾177﴿	4.400 13.300 ﴾213﴿	4.700 11.333 ﴾240﴿	5.200 12.166 ﴾192﴿	74.898	
140	Mohamed Abdeldjalil Bourguieg	Algeria	6.000 13.033 ﴾211﴿	4.600 11.933 ﴾198﴿	4.800 12.133 ﴾227﴿	5.200 13.666 ﴾168﴿	5.500 11.700 ﴾235﴿	4.800 12.100 ﴾194﴿	74.565	
141	John Orozco	United States	6.300 14.866 ﴾45﴿	6.100 14.400 ﴾39﴿	6.400 15.133 ﴾23﴿		6.800 15.400 ﴾11﴿	6.700 14.700 ﴾12﴿	74.499	
142	Svjatoslav Solovjev	Czech Republic	5.400 13.233 ﴾198﴿	4.100 12.400 ﴾171﴿	3.400 11.533 ﴾235﴿	4.400 13.166 ﴾222﴿	3.800 12.333 ﴾212﴿	4.100 11.766 ﴾209﴿	74.431	
143	Dimitar Dimitrov	Bulgaria	5.800 12.600 ﴾222﴿	4.800 11.766 ﴾205﴿	4.500 13.100 ﴾183﴿	5.200 13.566 ﴾181﴿	4.400 11.833 ﴾231﴿	4.100 11.400 ﴾225﴿	74.265	
144	Aizat Bin Muhammad Jufrie	Singapore	4.900 13.166 ﴾203﴿	2.2	4.700 12.300 ﴾222﴿	5.200 13.733 ﴾161﴿	4.200 13.233 ﴾165﴿	4.000 11.800 ﴾207﴿	74.098	
145	Brandon Field	New Zealand	5.300 12.533 ﴾225﴿	4.700 12.741 ﴾143﴿	4.400 12.000 ﴾229﴿	5.200 13.033 ﴾228﴿	5.100 12.833 ﴾196﴿	3.800 10.866 ﴾240﴿	74.006	
146	Yair Shechter	Israel	5.300 13.400 ﴾186﴿	4.400 12.133 ﴾190﴿	4.600 12.833 ﴾204﴿	4.400 12.800 ﴾236﴿	4.100 11.266 ﴾243﴿	4.100 11.333 ﴾229﴿	73.765	
147	Andreas Bretschneider	Germany	6.300 15.000 ﴾31﴿		6.100 14.633 ﴾47﴿	5.600 14.900 ﴾30﴿	6.400 15.266 ﴾18﴿	6.900 13.900 ﴾45﴿	73.699	
148	Martin Angelov	Bulgaria	6.000 14.033 ﴾119﴿	4.600 12.000 ﴾194﴿	3.900 10.100 ﴾243﴿	5.600 13.400 ﴾205﴿	4.700 12.275 ﴾215﴿	4.200 11.566 ﴾218﴿	73.374	
149	Wei An Terry Tay	Singapore	6.000 13.333 ﴾195﴿	3.800 10.600 ﴾237﴿	4.700 12.566 ﴾214﴿	5.200 14.366 ﴾91﴿	3.800 12.166 ﴾218﴿	3.2	72.731	
150	Trenten Wan	Australia	4.800 11.900 ﴾235﴿	4.700 10.533 ﴾239﴿	4.700 12.766 ﴾209﴿	4.400 13.666 ﴾168﴿	4.900 11.933 ﴾227﴿	4.100 11.866 ﴾202﴿	72.664	
151	Ashish Kumar	India	5.600 10.966 ﴾245﴿	5.300 11.133 ﴾225﴿	5.000 12.966 ﴾196﴿	5.600 13.166 ﴾222﴿	5.100 12.333 ﴾213﴿	4.600 11.933 ﴾199﴿	72.497	
152	Hansol Kim	South Korea	6.500 15.500 ﴾8﴿	5.200 13.733 ﴾78﴿	5.700 14.066 ﴾92﴿	6.000 15.100 ﴾20﴿	5.900 14.033 ﴾88﴿	0	72.432	
153	Dong Hyen Shin	South Korea	5.900 14.900 ﴾39﴿	6.500 14.650 ﴾21﴿		5.600 14.800 ﴾46﴿	6.100 14.366 ﴾61﴿	5.100 13.300 ﴾93﴿	72.016	
154	Kevin Lytwyn	Canada	6.000 14.900 ﴾40﴿		6.000 14.733 ﴾41﴿	5.200 13.533 ﴾185﴿	5.800 14.200 ﴾72﴿	6.600 14.233 ﴾26﴿	71.599	
155	Kai Cheng Timothy Tay	Singapore	5.100 13.066 ﴾208﴿	4.200 11.933 ﴾197﴿	4.000 11.833 ﴾233﴿	4.400 13.200 ﴾221﴿	4.200 10.466 ﴾247﴿	3.600 10.900 ﴾238﴿	71.398	
156	Majdi Al-Hmood	Jordan	5.600 13.758 ﴾155﴿	4.800 11.083 ﴾227﴿	4.000 12.133 ﴾226﴿	5.200 14.333 ﴾97﴿	4.6	3.900 10.900 ﴾239﴿	71.373	
157	Axel Augis	France		5.700 13.466 ﴾101﴿	5.900 14.725 ﴾43﴿	5.600 14.600 ﴾56﴿	6.600 15.366 ﴾12﴿	6.200 13.166 ﴾116﴿	71.323	
158	Javier Sandoval Afanador	Colombia	2.4	5.300 13.333 ﴾113﴿	5.300 13.700 ﴾132﴿	5.200 14.266 ﴾109﴿	6.500 14.300 ﴾65﴿	5.400 10.633 ﴾244﴿	71.165	
159	Helge Liebrich	Germany	5.900 13.800 ﴾148﴿	5.400 13.766 ﴾76﴿	5.800 14.333 ﴾68﴿	5.600 14.933 ﴾26﴿		5.800 13.933 ﴾41﴿	70.765	
160	Nicola Bartolini	Italy	5.800 14.633 ﴾58﴿	5.600 14.066 ﴾56﴿	0	5.600 14.566 ﴾62﴿	5.500 13.908 ﴾105﴿	5.300 13.266 ﴾99﴿	70.439	
161	Jeffrey Wammes	Netherlands	6.100 14.600 ﴾62﴿		5.400 13.800 ﴾117﴿	5.200 14.133 ﴾127﴿	5.400 13.933 ﴾101﴿	6.100 13.900 ﴾44﴿	70.366	
162	Rayderley Miguel Zapata Santana	Spain	6.700 15.566 ﴾6﴿		5.400 13.000 ﴾189﴿	6.000 15.233 ﴾11﴿	5.300 13.800 ﴾116﴿	4.900 12.200 ﴾188﴿	69.799	
163	Jhonny Alexander Munoz Perez	Colombia	5.600 13.766 ﴾152﴿	6.200 13.900 ﴾65﴿		5.200 14.233 ﴾113﴿	6.100 14.008 ﴾90﴿	6.400 13.600 ﴾66﴿	69.507	
164	Diego Hypólito	Brazil	7.000 15.900 ﴾3﴿	4.600 11.866 ﴾201﴿		5.600 14.600 ﴾56﴿	5.200 13.866 ﴾108﴿	4.600 13.133 ﴾118﴿	69.365	
165	Jorge Hugo Giraldo Lopez	Colombia		5.700 12.700 ﴾149﴿	5.900 14.233 ﴾77﴿	5.200 13.900 ﴾149﴿	6.400 14.833 ﴾37﴿	5.400 13.500 ﴾75﴿	69.166	
166	Alberto Tallon Fernandez	Spain	5.800 14.533 ﴾66﴿	5.300 13.233 ﴾123﴿	5.900 14.466 ﴾56﴿		5.300 13.483 ﴾143﴿	4.900 13.233 ﴾103﴿	68.948	
167	Vasili Mikhalitsyn	Belarus		6.200 14.333 ﴾44﴿	5.700 14.033 ﴾96﴿	4.400 13.500 ﴾190﴿	6.500 14.133 ﴾79﴿	4.900 12.900 ﴾139﴿	68.899	
168	Alexandru Andrei Ursache	Romania	6.000 14.400 ﴾86﴿	6.200 14.433 ﴾38﴿	5.500 14.033 ﴾95﴿		5.800 13.933 ﴾102﴿	5.300 12.000 ﴾197﴿	68.799	
169	Eleftherios Kosmidis	Greece	6.600 15.533 ﴾7﴿		4.600 13.166 ﴾181﴿	5.200 14.266 ﴾109﴿	5.000 13.633 ﴾130﴿	4.300 12.100 ﴾193﴿	68.698	
170	Calvo Agudelo	Colombia	5.600 13.458 ﴾182﴿	5.500 14.000 ﴾60﴿	5.800 13.966 ﴾106﴿		6.200 14.066 ﴾84﴿	5.900 12.766 ﴾155﴿	68.256	
171	Georgii Petrosian	Ukraine	5.200 13.666 ﴾163﴿	5.600 13.633 ﴾83﴿	5.100 13.100 ﴾184﴿		5.900 14.116 ﴾80﴿	5.700 13.666 ﴾57﴿	68.181	
172	Boudewijn de Vries	Netherlands		5.800 14.300 ﴾45﴿	4.800 12.766 ﴾210﴿	4.400 13.266 ﴾215﴿	5.100 14.000 ﴾91﴿	5.900 13.666 ﴾58﴿	67.998	
173	Kevin Cerda Gastelum	Mexico	5.800 14.466 ﴾73﴿		4.800 13.400 ﴾161﴿	5.200 14.266 ﴾109﴿	5.100 12.100 ﴾219﴿	5.900 13.600 ﴾65﴿	67.832	
174	Nurbol Babylov	Kazakhstan	5.300 13.200 ﴾201﴿	3.3	4.700 11.866 ﴾231﴿	5.600 13.100 ﴾226﴿	5.400 12.266 ﴾216﴿	5.200 12.333 ﴾182﴿	67.731	
175	Rohan Sebastian	Ireland	5.600 13.933 ﴾130﴿		5.900 14.366 ﴾65﴿	4.800 13.700 ﴾166﴿	4.500 12.833 ﴾194﴿	4.400 12.800 ﴾147﴿	67.632	
176	Tristian Perez Rivera	Puerto Rico	5.700 14.200 ﴾103﴿	4.900 12.266 ﴾181﴿	5.600 14.466 ﴾72﴿	5.700 13.333 ﴾158﴿	5.300 13.266 ﴾99﴿		67.531	
177	Thomas Neuteleers	Belgium	6.000 12.933 ﴾214﴿		4.800 13.966 ﴾145﴿	6.200 14.625 ﴾49﴿	4.800 11.866 ﴾203﴿		67.29	
178	Rafael Morales Casado	Puerto Rico	5.800 14.533 ﴾66﴿	5.800 12.233 ﴾186﴿	5.200 14.600 ﴾56﴿	5.000 12.933 ﴾187﴿			66.832	
179	Attila Vlacsil	Hungary	4.900 13.366 ﴾188﴿		5.600 13.633 ﴾177﴿	5.100 12.733 ﴾200﴿	5.100 12.200 ﴾189﴿		66.565	
180	Adrian Efrain Prieto Angel	Mexico	5.400 13.900 ﴾133﴿	5.300 13.241 ﴾120﴿		4.600 12.900 ﴾188﴿	5.400 13.000 ﴾132﴿		66.307	
181	Georgios Christos Chatziefstathiou	Greece	5.100 13.500 ﴾177﴿	5.300 13.741 ﴾77﴿		5.200 13.633 ﴾132﴿	4.700 11.833 ﴾205﴿		66.107	
182	Florian Braitsch	Austria	5.400 13.933 ﴾129﴿	5.200 13.333 ﴾112﴿		4.900 12.500 ﴾207﴿	5.100 13.000 ﴾131﴿		66.032	
182	Michael Fussenegger	Austria	5.800 14.266 ﴾95﴿		5.600 13.800 ﴾157﴿	3.900 10.633 ﴾245﴿	5.100 12.900 ﴾141﴿		66.032	
184	Joao Fuglsig	Denmark	5.400 13.866 ﴾141﴿	3.900 11.133 ﴾223﴿	5.600 14.866 ﴾36﴿	4.300 11.866 ﴾229﴿	1.9		65.631	
185	Coskun Boncuk	Turkey	5.400 13.666 ﴾165﴿	4.500 12.233 ﴾184﴿	4.400 13.533 ﴾185﴿	4.200 12.766 ﴾198﴿			65.598	
186	Jin Hyok Kim	North Korea		5.700 12.366 ﴾177﴿	3.600 12.766 ﴾237﴿	6.800 14.000 ﴾97﴿	5.400 11.566 ﴾219﴿		65.564	
187	Chun Kit Poon	Hong Kong	5.300 12.566 ﴾223﴿	4.200 10.333 ﴾242﴿	4.400 13.666 ﴾168﴿	2.1	2.900 11.633 ﴾215﴿		65.364	
188	Simao Almeida	Portugal	5.900 12.933 ﴾213﴿		5.200 14.100 ﴾130﴿	5.400 13.766 ﴾120﴿	4.200 10.266 ﴾245﴿		65.248	
189	Michael Sorokine	Israel	4.800 13.333 ﴾191﴿	4.400 12.800 ﴾141﴿	4.400 13.566 ﴾181﴿	4.900 12.900 ﴾189﴿	4.800 12.633 ﴾161﴿		65.232	
190	Vinzenz Hoeck	Austria		4.500 10.900 ﴾232﴿	5.200 13.800 ﴾157﴿	4.900 13.166 ﴾169﴿	4.600 12.933 ﴾137﴿		65.032	
191	Abhijit Shinde	India	5.400 14.000 ﴾122﴿		4.800 13.533 ﴾185﴿	5.200 12.466 ﴾209﴿	4.200 12.000 ﴾196﴿		64.932	
192	Sherif Hossameldin Gawdat	Egypt	4.300 12.133 ﴾233﴿	4.400 12.600 ﴾158﴿	4.400 12.933 ﴾231﴿		4.400 12.166 ﴾191﴿		63.165	
193	Hung-Sheng Lu	Chinese Taipei		4.400 11.133 ﴾224﴿	5.200 14.200 ﴾121﴿	4.900 12.891 ﴾190﴿	4.600 11.466 ﴾222﴿		63.123	
194	Daniel Fox	Ireland		3.300 11.600 ﴾209﴿	3.600 12.633 ﴾241﴿	5.000 13.500 ﴾140﴿	2.500 11.200 ﴾232﴿		61.999	
195	Karim Ayman Abd Elfattah	Egypt	4.400 10.700 ﴾249﴿	4.800 12.400 ﴾174﴿	5.200 13.866 ﴾153﴿	5.000 13.033 ﴾180﴿	4.800 11.200 ﴾233﴿		61.199	
196	Kam Wah Liu	Hong Kong	5.200 13.766 ﴾149﴿	3.400 10.200 ﴾243﴿	5.600 13.466 ﴾193﴿	4.100 11.733 ﴾233﴿			61.131	
197	Chandan Pathak	India	5.300 13.466 ﴾179﴿	5.100 11.300 ﴾218﴿	4.800 13.158 ﴾225﴿		4.500 10.933 ﴾237﴿		60.957	
198	Chenglong Zhang	China	6.700 15.133 ﴾25﴿		6.000 15.133 ﴾18﴿	6.500 15.466 ﴾9﴿	7.400 15.166 ﴾3﴿		60.898	
199	Hao You	China		6.400 14.933 ﴾15﴿		7.100 15.500 ﴾8﴿	6.700 14.600 ﴾16﴿		60.666	
200	Hristos Marinov	Bulgaria	5.300 11.766 ﴾236﴿	4.800 10.125 ﴾246﴿		5.800 12.666 ﴾204﴿	4.100 11.766 ﴾209﴿		60.356	
201	Alexander Naddour	United States	6.400 15.366 ﴾14﴿	6.800 15.633 ﴾2﴿	6.400 15.233 ﴾19﴿	5.600 13.633 ﴾177﴿			59.865	
202	Danell Leyva	United States		6.000 14.566 ﴾29﴿		5.600 14.700 ﴾50﴿	6.900 15.900 ﴾1﴿	6.700 13.600 ﴾67﴿	58.766	
203	Andrea Cingolani	Italy	6.300 14.933 ﴾36﴿	0	6.600 15.133 ﴾24﴿	5.600 14.833 ﴾38﴿	5.700 13.800 ﴾118﴿		58.699	
204	Daniel Corral Barron	Mexico		6.700 14.166 ﴾54﴿	6.100 14.766 ﴾40﴿	5.200 14.366 ﴾91﴿	6.400 14.933 ﴾34﴿		58.231	
205	Pascal Bucher	Switzerland		6.100 14.766 ﴾19﴿		5.200 14.200 ﴾121﴿	6.300 15.333 ﴾13﴿	6.000 13.900 ﴾43﴿	58.199	
206	Eleftherios Petrounias	Greece	6.000 14.500 ﴾71﴿	5.300 13.366 ﴾108﴿	6.700 15.733 ﴾3﴿	5.200 14.400 ﴾82﴿			57.999	
207	Kiu Chung Ng	Hong Kong	4.500 12.233 ﴾232﴿	3.7	6.300 14.000 ﴾104﴿		4.400 11.300 ﴾241﴿	2.900 11.000 ﴾236﴿	57.933	
208	Benjamin Gischard	Switzerland	5.900 14.433 ﴾77﴿	5.600 14.200 ﴾50﴿	6.100 14.333 ﴾69﴿	5.600 14.666 ﴾52﴿			57.632	
209	Francisco Carlos Barretto Junior	Brazil		5.800 14.200 ﴾51﴿	5.900 14.400 ﴾63﴿		6.300 14.700 ﴾43﴿	6.400 14.000 ﴾37﴿	57.3	
210	Marius Daniel Berbecar	Romania			5.400 14.166 ﴾82﴿	5.600 14.633 ﴾53﴿	6.500 15.233 ﴾21﴿	5.200 13.233 ﴾104﴿	57.265	
211	Isaac Botella Pérez	Spain	6.400 14.933 ﴾38﴿	5.000 12.733 ﴾146﴿	5.700 14.400 ﴾62﴿	5.600 14.833 ﴾38﴿			56.899	
212	Daniel Petrica Vasile Radeanu	Romania	6.300 14.766 ﴾50﴿	5.500 13.600 ﴾88﴿	5.400 13.733 ﴾127﴿	5.600 14.733 ﴾47﴿			56.832	
213	Tomi Tuuha	Finland	5.900 14.500 ﴾70﴿	0	5.300 14.100 ﴾91﴿	5.600 15.000 ﴾24﴿	4.000 13.133 ﴾170﴿		56.733	
214	Lukas Dauser	Germany		4.500 13.000 ﴾134﴿		5.600 14.600 ﴾56﴿	6.400 15.133 ﴾25﴿	5.800 13.566 ﴾69﴿	56.299	
215	Kevin Rossi	Switzerland	5.800 14.400 ﴾82﴿		5.200 13.933 ﴾108﴿		5.800 14.300 ﴾64﴿	5.800 13.233 ﴾105﴿	55.866	
216	Philipp Herder	Germany	6.000 14.600 ﴾61﴿	5.500 11.966 ﴾196﴿	5.600 14.466 ﴾55﴿		6.400 14.608 ﴾50﴿		55.64	
217	Andrii Sienichkin	Ukraine		6.600 14.233 ﴾49﴿		5.200 14.166 ﴾125﴿	5.000 13.833 ﴾111﴿	5.300 13.333 ﴾91﴿	55.565	
218	Kristof Schroe	Belgium		5.300 13.833 ﴾69﴿	5.000 12.933 ﴾200﴿		5.800 14.000 ﴾93﴿	6.700 14.733 ﴾11﴿	55.499	
219	Jin Seong Yun	South Korea		5.600 12.600 ﴾162﴿	5.500 13.900 ﴾113﴿		6.200 14.700 ﴾41﴿	6.300 14.100 ﴾32﴿	55.3	
220	Alexander Rodríguez	Puerto Rico	5.600 14.633 ﴾57﴿	5.600 12.400 ﴾175﴿		5.200 14.400 ﴾82﴿		5.400 13.433 ﴾83﴿	54.866	
221	Vlasios Maras	Greece		5.000 13.100 ﴾128﴿		5.200 14.633 ﴾53﴿	5.100 13.800 ﴾113﴿	6.700 13.166 ﴾117﴿	54.699	
222	Julien Gobaux	France	6.000 13.433 ﴾184﴿	5.700 13.333 ﴾115﴿			6.200 14.700 ﴾41﴿	5.300 13.200 ﴾110﴿	54.666	
223	Robert Tee Kriangkum	Thailand	5.600 14.000 ﴾125﴿	4.900 12.733 ﴾145﴿		5.600 14.533 ﴾65﴿	5.200 13.000 ﴾183﴿		54.266	
224	İbrahim Çolak	Turkey	5.600 14.000 ﴾125﴿		6.600 15.500 ﴾10﴿		6.100 13.333 ﴾161﴿	5.200 11.033 ﴾235﴿	53.866	
225	Heikki Niva	Finland	5.600 14.166 ﴾104﴿	4.300 12.400 ﴾172﴿	4.600 13.400 ﴾160﴿	0	5.300 13.866 ﴾109﴿	0	53.832	
226	Julian Perez Marchant	Spain		4.300 11.800 ﴾203﴿		5.600 14.833 ﴾38﴿	5.200 13.566 ﴾136﴿	5.300 13.600 ﴾64﴿	53.799	
227	Michael Mercieca	Australia		5.400 13.133 ﴾126﴿	5.800 14.000 ﴾103﴿		5.500 12.966 ﴾185﴿	6.000 13.566 ﴾70﴿	53.665	
228	Diogo Lopes Romero	Portugal	5.300 13.566 ﴾173﴿	5.400 13.066 ﴾131﴿			4.900 13.866 ﴾107﴿	4.800 13.166 ﴾113﴿	53.664	
229	Nam Dang	Vietnam	5.200 13.833 ﴾144﴿	5.100 11.100 ﴾226﴿	6.500 15.033 ﴾27﴿	5.600 13.400 ﴾205﴿			53.366	
230	Aliaksandr Tsarevich	Belarus	5.000 12.500 ﴾226﴿	5.400 12.266 ﴾182﴿			6.200 14.233 ﴾69﴿	6.500 14.200 ﴾27﴿	53.199	
231	Luis Filipe de Araujo	Portugal	5.900 13.566 ﴾175﴿	4.700 12.466 ﴾167﴿		5.600 13.666 ﴾168﴿	5.000 12.000 ﴾223﴿		51.698	
232	Cuong Hoang	Vietnam		4.200 11.266 ﴾219﴿	5.100 13.700 ﴾130﴿		6.300 13.641 ﴾129﴿	4.600 12.900 ﴾138﴿	51.507	
233	Vu Hung Do	Vietnam	5.600 13.833 ﴾145﴿			5.600 14.733 ﴾47﴿	5.600 11.533 ﴾238﴿	3.800 11.333 ﴾227﴿	51.432	
234	Ta Yu Huang	Chinese Taipei	4.400 13.366 ﴾187﴿	5.300 13.433 ﴾104﴿			4.400 11.533 ﴾237﴿	5.400 12.900 ﴾143﴿	51.232	
235	Torry Larsen	Norway	5.500 14.216 ﴾101﴿	3.800 10.741 ﴾234﴿		4.400 13.616 ﴾180﴿		4.500 12.600 ﴾166﴿	51.173	
236	Salokhiddin Mirzaev	Uzbekistan	4.600 10.733 ﴾248﴿		5.100 13.566 ﴾144﴿	5.600 14.433 ﴾76﴿		3.900 12.300 ﴾183﴿	51.032	
237	Francisco Fragoso	Portugal		5.300 11.500 ﴾212﴿	5.700 13.000 ﴾191﴿	5.600 13.233 ﴾220﴿		5.100 13.266 ﴾98﴿	50.999	
238	Stig Kjeldsen	Denmark	5.900 14.266 ﴾96﴿			5.200 13.100 ﴾226﴿	4.000 12.000 ﴾221﴿	3.900 11.333 ﴾228﴿	50.699	
239	Moran Yanuka	Israel		5.300 11.733 ﴾207﴿	4.600 12.933 ﴾198﴿		4.500 12.575 ﴾205﴿	5.300 13.200 ﴾110﴿	50.441	
240	Wai Hung Shek	Hong Kong		4.200 12.200 ﴾187﴿	3.000 10.933 ﴾240﴿	6.000 15.366 ﴾5﴿		5.100 11.933 ﴾200﴿	50.432	
241	Aleksandar Batinkov	Bulgaria	5.600 12.333 ﴾229﴿			5.200 13.700 ﴾166﴿	4.100 10.966 ﴾244﴿	5.300 13.175 ﴾112﴿	50.174	
242	Jaime Humberto Romero Moran	Mexico	5.400 12.866 ﴾216﴿	4.800 11.933 ﴾199﴿		4.800 13.733 ﴾161﴿		5.100 10.800 ﴾242﴿	49.332	
243	Man Hin Jim	Hong Kong	4.100 10.933 ﴾246﴿			6.000 13.733 ﴾161﴿	5.300 11.866 ﴾230﴿	4.900 12.533 ﴾171﴿	49.065	
244	Joel Alvarez Vergara	Chile		3.800 10.966 ﴾229﴿	4.500 12.233 ﴾223﴿		5.000 12.833 ﴾195﴿	5.600 12.666 ﴾159﴿	48.698	
245	Denis Ablyazin	Russia	7.100 16.066 ﴾1﴿		6.800 15.866 ﴾2﴿	6.000 15.266 ﴾9﴿			47.198	
246	Kenzo Shirai	Japan	7.400 16.033 ﴾2﴿			6.000 15.258 ﴾10﴿	6.200 15.066 ﴾30﴿		46.357	
247	Se Gwang Ri	North Korea	1.4	5.300 13.600 ﴾87﴿	6.700 15.150 ﴾22﴿	6.400 15.400 ﴾2﴿			46.183	
248	Jacob Buus	Denmark		2.900 10.433 ﴾241﴿		4.400 12.366 ﴾249﴿	3.700 11.533 ﴾236﴿	4.500 11.666 ﴾213﴿	45.998	
249	Scott Morgan	Canada	6.400 15.266 ﴾19﴿		6.600 15.233 ﴾20﴿	5.600 14.833 ﴾38﴿			45.332	
250	Kristian Thomas	United Kingdom	6.200 15.000 ﴾29﴿			6.000 15.200 ﴾15﴿		6.700 14.800 ﴾9﴿	45	
251	Igor Radivilov	Ukraine	5.700 14.066 ﴾114﴿		6.800 15.533 ﴾9﴿	6.000 15.233 ﴾11﴿			44.832	
252	Arthur Nabarrete Zanetti	Brazil	6.400 14.266 ﴾97﴿		6.800 15.716 ﴾4﴿	5.600 14.833 ﴾38﴿			44.815	
253	Hak Seon Yang	South Korea	6.200 15.116 ﴾26﴿		6.200 14.300 ﴾72﴿	6.000 15.366 ﴾5﴿			44.782	
254	Samir Aït Saïd	France	5.700 14.333 ﴾90﴿		6.800 15.666 ﴾6﴿	5.600 14.500 ﴾71﴿			44.499	
255	Anton Fokin	Uzbekistan		5.800 14.633 ﴾23﴿	6.000 14.500 ﴾54﴿		6.700 15.133 ﴾28﴿		44.266	
256	Yang Liu	China	6.000 13.333 ﴾194﴿		6.900 15.933 ﴾1﴿	5.200 14.400 ﴾82﴿			43.666	
257	Courtney Tulloch	United Kingdom		5.800 13.833 ﴾70﴿	6.700 15.700 ﴾5﴿		6.200 14.000 ﴾94﴿		43.533	
258	Chen Chih-Yu	Chinese Taipei	5.200 13.733 ﴾156﴿		6.700 15.283 ﴾14﴿	5.200 14.300 ﴾101﴿			43.316	
259	Epke Zonderland	Netherlands		4.400 12.566 ﴾164﴿			6.600 15.083 ﴾29﴿	7.200 15.600 ﴾1﴿	43.249	
260	Siemon Volkaert	Belgium	5.800 14.400 ﴾82﴿	6.300 14.200 ﴾52﴿		5.200 14.166 ﴾125﴿			42.766	
261	Federico Molinari	Argentina			6.700 15.283 ﴾14﴿		5.200 14.033 ﴾86﴿	5.100 13.133 ﴾119﴿	42.449	
262	Pavel Bulauski	Belarus	5.700 13.233 ﴾200﴿		6.100 13.833 ﴾116﴿	6.000 14.933 ﴾26﴿			41.999	
263	Kohei Kameyama	Japan		6.900 14.300 ﴾46﴿	5.500 14.333 ﴾67﴿			6.000 13.300 ﴾97﴿	41.933	
263	Ivan Stretovich	Russia		5.800 13.500 ﴾97﴿			6.000 14.400 ﴾56﴿	6.100 14.033 ﴾34﴿	41.933	
265	Tommy Ramos	Puerto Rico			6.700 14.933 ﴾31﴿		5.300 13.966 ﴾99﴿	5.400 13.000 ﴾132﴿	41.899	
266	Sakari Vekki	Finland	5.900 14.800 ﴾47﴿		0	5.200 14.300 ﴾101﴿		4.500 12.700 ﴾157﴿	41.8	
267	Rartchawat Kaewpanya	Thailand		6.400 14.600 ﴾26﴿		3.600 12.633 ﴾241﴿	6.000 14.066 ﴾83﴿		41.299	
268	Michel Bletterman	Netherlands	6.000 14.233 ﴾100﴿	5.300 12.666 ﴾154﴿		5.200 14.066 ﴾134﴿			40.965	
269	Fabian Leimlehner	Austria	5.100 14.100 ﴾111﴿	4.800 12.800 ﴾142﴿		5.200 14.033 ﴾141﴿			40.933	
270	Ioan Laurentiu Nistor	Romania		5.700 13.633 ﴾84﴿			5.900 14.133 ﴾77﴿	5.700 13.166 ﴾114﴿	40.932	
271	Juan Pablo Gonzalez Valenzuela	Chile	6.000 14.700 ﴾54﴿	4.500 11.266 ﴾221﴿		5.600 14.933 ﴾26﴿			40.899	
272	Matthew Palmer	New Zealand	4.800 13.566 ﴾172﴿		5.200 13.733 ﴾125﴿	4.400 13.533 ﴾185﴿			40.832	
273	Andrey Medvedev	Israel	5.900 13.133 ﴾204﴿		5.300 13.566 ﴾145﴿	6.000 13.833 ﴾156﴿			40.532	
274	Islam Hatem Abou Hamda	Egypt			4.900 12.666 ﴾212﴿	4.400 13.433 ﴾199﴿	4.600 11.966 ﴾224﴿	1.5	40.165	
275	Kenneth Ikeda	Canada		6.200 14.608 ﴾25﴿			6.200 13.933 ﴾103﴿	5.500 11.566 ﴾220﴿	40.107	
276	Azizbek Kudratullayev	Kazakhstan			6.400 14.900 ﴾33﴿		5.200 13.533 ﴾139﴿	4.000 10.633 ﴾243﴿	39.066	
277	Reid Mcgowan	New Zealand		5.100 13.800 ﴾73﴿			4.600 11.933 ﴾226﴿	4.600 13.066 ﴾124﴿	38.799	
278	Ian Makowske	Ireland	5.300 13.466 ﴾180﴿	5.000 11.483 ﴾213﴿				5.400 13.633 ﴾62﴿	38.582	
279	Nicolas Bracco	Argentina	4.800 12.300 ﴾230﴿	4.300 12.433 ﴾169﴿		4.800 13.666 ﴾168﴿			38.399	
280	Ümit Şamiloğlu	Turkey		3.900 10.466 ﴾240﴿		5.200 14.433 ﴾76﴿		6.500 13.266 ﴾102﴿	38.165	
281	Eldar Safarov	Azerbaijan	0	0	4.700 13.233 ﴾179﴿	0	4.100 12.200 ﴾217﴿	4.600 11.900 ﴾201﴿	37.333	
282	Maxim Petrishko	Kazakhstan	4.900 11.166 ﴾242﴿	5.000 13.333 ﴾110﴿		3.600 12.666 ﴾238﴿			37.165	
283	Iliya Tudzharov	Bulgaria		4.600 11.766 ﴾204﴿	5.000 12.400 ﴾220﴿	4.400 12.666 ﴾238﴿			36.832	
284	Moustafa Karawya	Egypt		5.300 12.666 ﴾154﴿	5.000 11.466 ﴾237﴿		4.500 11.733 ﴾234﴿		35.865	
285	Ughur Khalilbayli	Azerbaijan	5.800 12.033 ﴾234﴿	5.100 10.133 ﴾245﴿	0 0.000 ﴾245﴿	4.800 12.466 ﴾248﴿	0 0.000 ﴾254﴿	0	34.632	
286	Filip Ude	Croatia	2.6	6.500 15.533 ﴾4﴿	1.900 10.816 ﴾241﴿		0 0.000 ﴾254﴿	0	32.449	
287	Mauro Graciano	Angola	2.700 10.800 ﴾247﴿		1.5 5.933 ﴾244﴿	2.400 10.400 ﴾252﴿	2.4 4.866 ﴾252﴿		31.999	
288	Jose Epalanga	Angola	4.500 11.400 ﴾241﴿	1.4		3.000 11.791 ﴾251﴿	1.8 3.533 ﴾253﴿		29.257	
289	Christopher Remkes	Australia	6.000 14.166 ﴾107﴿			5.200 13.933 ﴾147﴿			28.099	
290	Carlos Orozco Arenas	Colombia	5.700 13.266 ﴾197﴿			5.200 14.433 ﴾76﴿			27.699	
291	Ziga Silc	Slovenia	5.900 14.300 ﴾92﴿			3.600 12.666 ﴾238﴿			26.966	
292	Jakub Piwowarski	Poland	5.100 13.533 ﴾176﴿	0		4.400 13.366 ﴾210﴿			26.899	
293	Adam Dalton	Ireland	5.600 13.333 ﴾193﴿			4.400 13.433 ﴾199﴿			26.766	
294	Juho Kanerva	Finland		5.900 14.016 ﴾59﴿			0 0.000 ﴾254﴿	5.000 12.633 ﴾163﴿	26.649	
295	Peter Lampret	Slovenia			5.800 13.866 ﴾115﴿		4.900 12.366 ﴾211﴿		26.232	
296	Dhan Bahadur	India		5.800 13.200 ﴾125﴿			5.400 12.800 ﴾197﴿		26	
297	Arian Bedzeti-Olsen	Norway			4.800 13.300 ﴾170﴿		3.800 12.666 ﴾203﴿		25.966	
298	Adam Kierzkowski	Poland			0 0.000 ﴾245﴿		5.900 11.350 ﴾239﴿	4.900 12.633 ﴾162﴿	23.983	
299	Kasper Rydberg	Denmark	5.900 12.700 ﴾220﴿		2.800 11.100 ﴾239﴿				23.8	
300	Kwang Chun Kim	North Korea					5.300 11.933 ﴾228﴿	4.300 11.700 ﴾212﴿	23.633	
301	Andrej Korosteljev	Croatia	6.400 14.966 ﴾35﴿	3.8 8.300 ﴾252﴿	0 0.000 ﴾245﴿	0.000 ﴾253﴿	0 0.000 ﴾254﴿	0 0.000 ﴾249﴿	23.266	
302	Robert Seligman	Croatia		6.400 15.466 ﴾6﴿		0.000 ﴾253﴿	2.1 7.316 ﴾250﴿		22.782	
303	Krisztián Berki	Hungary		7.000 16.066 ﴾1﴿					16.066	
304	Sašo Bertoncelj	Slovenia		6.500 15.558 ﴾3﴿					15.558	
305	Harutyum Merdinyan	Armenia		6.600 15.250 ﴾9﴿					15.25	
306	Marijo Možnik	Croatia	0 0.000 ﴾253﴿	0 0.000 ﴾255﴿	0 0.000 ﴾245﴿	0.000 ﴾253﴿		6.700 15.000 ﴾5﴿	15	
307	Tomislav Markovic	Croatia	6.300 14.900 ﴾42﴿		0 0.000 ﴾245﴿	0.000 ﴾253﴿	0 0.000 ﴾254﴿	0 0.000 ﴾249﴿	14.9	
308	Abdulla Azimov	Uzbekistan		6.000 14.700 ﴾20﴿					14.7	
309	Ahmed Aldayani	Qatar		6.000 12.666 ﴾157﴿					12.666	
310	Alberto Busnari	Italy						4.100 12.166 ﴾190﴿	12.166	
311	Malek Alyahri	Qatar		4.8 9.766 ﴾250﴿					9.766	

== Floor Exercise ==
Rank	Gymnast	Nation	D Score	E Score	Pen.	Total	Qual.
1	Denis Ablyazin	Russia	7.100	8.966		16.066	Q
2	Kenzo Shirai	Japan	7.400	8.733	0.1	16.033	Q
3	Diego Hypólito	Brazil	7.000	8.900		15.900	Q
4	Ryohei Kato	Japan	6.700	9.133		15.833	Q
5	Kōhei Uchimura	Japan	6.600	9.200		15.800	-
6	Rayderley Zapata Santana	Spain	6.700	8.866		15.566	Q
7	Eleftherios Kosmidis	Greece	6.600	8.933		15.533	Q
8	Kim Hansol	South Korea	6.500	9.000		15.500	Q
9	Jacob Dalton	United States	6.700	8.866	0.1	15.466	Q
10	Deng Shudi	China	6.700	8.766		15.466	R
11	Daniel Purvis	Great Britain	6.500	8.933		15.433	R
11	Cheng Ran	China	6.700	8.733		15.433	R

== Pommel Horse ==
Rank	Gymnast	Nation	D Score	E Score	Pen.	Total	Qual.
1	Krisztián Berki	Hungary	7.000	9.066		16.066	Q
2	Alexander Naddour	United States	6.800	8.833		15.633	Q
3	Sašo Bertoncelj	Slovenia	6.500	9.058		15.558	Q
4	Filip Ude	Croatia	6.500	9.033		15.533	Q
5	Cyril Tommasone	France	6.800	8.700		15.500	Q
6	Robert Seligman	Croatia	6.400	9.066		15.466	Q
7	Andrey Likhovitskiy	Belarus	6.600	8.733		15.333	Q
8	Daniel Keatings	Great Britain	7.100	8.233		15.333	Q
9	Harutyum Merdinyan	Armenia	6.600	8.650		15.250	R
10	David Belyavskiy	Russia	6.600	8.633		15.233	R
11	Max Whitlock	Great Britain	7.200	8.033		15.233	R

== Still Rings ==
Rank	Gymnast	Nation	D Score	E Score	Pen.	Total	Qual.
1	Liu Yang	China	6.900	9.033		15.933	Q
2	Denis Ablyazin	Russia	6.800	9.066		15.866	Q
3	Eleftherios Petrounias	Greece	6.700	9.033		15.733	Q
4	Arthur Zanetti	Brazil	6.800	8.916		15.716	Q
5	Courtney Tulloch	Great Britain	6.700	9.000		15.700	Q
6	Samir Aït Saïd	France	6.800	8.866		15.666	Q
7	You Hao	China	6.900	8.733		15.633	Q
8	Nikita Ignatyev	Russia	6.600	8.966		15.566	Q
9	Igor Radivilov	Ukraine	6.800	8.733		15.533	R
10	İbrahim Çolak	Turkey	6.600	8.900		15.500	R
11	Donnell Whittenburg	United States	6.700	8.800		15.500	R

== Vault ==
Rank	Gymnast	Nation	D Score	E Score	Pen.	Score 1	D Score	E Score	Pen.	Score 2	Total	Qual.
Rank	Gymnast	Nation	Vault 1				Vault 2				Total	Qual.
1	Yang Hak Seon	South Korea	6.000	9.366		15.366	6.000	9.533		15.533	15.449	Q
2	Denis Ablyazin	Russia	6.000	9.266		15.266	6.200	9.300		15.500	15.383	Q
3	Ri Se Gwang	North Korea	6.400	9.000		15.400	6.400	9.000	-0.3	15.100	15.250	Q
4	Igor Radivilov	Ukraine	6.000	9.233		15.233	6.000	9.233		15.233	15.233	Q
5	Kenzo Shirai	Japan	6.000	9.258		15.258	5.600	9.533		15.133	15.195	Q
6	Jacob Dalton	United States	6.000	9.133		15.133	6.000	9.233		15.233	15.183	Q
7	Shek Wai Hung	Hong Kong	6.000	9.366		15.366	6.000	9.033	-0.1	14.933	15.149	Q
8	Sergio Sasaki	Brazil	6.000	9.391		15.391	6.000	8.866	-0.1	14.766	15.078	Q
9	Kristian Thomas	Great Britain	6.000	9.200		15.200	5.600	9.266		14.866	15.033	R
10	Hansol Kim	South Korea	6.000	9.200	-0.1	15.100	6.000	8.866	-0.1	14.766	14.933	R
11	Diego Hypólito	Brazil	5.600	9.300	-0.3	14.600	5.800	9.366		15.166	14.883	R

== Parallel Bars ==
Rank	Gymnast	Nation	D Score	E Score	Pen.	Total	Qual.
1	Danell Leyva	United States	6.900	9.000		15.900	Q
2	Oleg Verniaiev	Ukraine	6.900	8.866		15.766	Q
3	Yusuke Tanaka	Japan	6.600	9.100		15.700	Q
4	Deng Shudi	China	7.100	8.583		15.683	Q
5	Ryohei Kato	Japan	6.600	8.933		15.533	Q
6	Cheng Ran	China	6.800	8.733		15.533	Q
7	Donnell Whittenburg	United States	6.900	8.633		15.533	Q
8	Nikolai Kuksenkov	Russia	6.600	8.800		15.400	Q
9	Axel Augis	France	6.600	8.766		15.366	R
10	Fabian Hambuechen	Germany	6.300	9.033		15.333	R
11	Pascal Bucher	Switzerland	6.300	9.033		15.333	R

== Horizontal Bar ==
Rank	Gymnast	Nation	D Score	E Score	Pen.	Total	Qual.
1	Epke Zonderland	Netherlands	7.200	8.400		15.600	Q
2	Kohei Uchimura	Japan	6.900	8.300		15.200	Q
3	Zhang Chenglong	China	7.400	7.766		15.166	Q
4	Nikolai Kuksenkov	Russia	7.000	8.133		15.133	Q
5	Marijo Možnik	Croatia	6.700	8.300		15.000	Q
6	Nile Wilson	Great Britain	6.200	8.700		14.900	Q
7	David Belyavskiy	Russia	6.400	8.466		14.866	Q
8	Jossimar Calvo	Colombia	7.200	7.666		14.866	Q
9	Kristian Thomas	Great Britain	6.700	8.100		14.800	R
10	Oleg Verniaiev	Ukraine	6.500	8.266		14.766	R
11	Kristof Schroe	Belgium	6.700	8.033		14.733	R
