= Mykyta Yermak =

Ukrainian artistic gymnast (born 1993)

- Born: 10 November 1993 (age 32)
- Height: 1.67 m (5 ft 6 in)

Gymnastics career
- Discipline: Men's artistic gymnastics
- Country represented: Ukraine
- Club: Armed Forces of Ukraine, Kyiv
- Head coach: H. Sartynskyi
Medal record
Men's artistic gymnastics
Representing Ukraine
European Games
Silver medal – second place	2015 Baku	Team
Universiade
Bronze medal – third place	2015 Gwangju	Team
European Youth Olympic Festival
Silver medal – second place	2009 Tampere	Rings

Mykyta Yermak (Ukrainian: Микита Єрмак; born 10 November 1993) is a Ukrainian male artistic gymnast and member of the national team. He is a silver medallist of the 2015 European Games.

== Career ==
The most active part of Yermak's sporting career was in the period between 2013 and 2015. In the qualification at the 2013 World Championships, Yermak was 45th on parallel bars, 95th on rings and 120th on floor. The 2014 World Championships was slightly more successful for him. He finished 32nd in the qualification for the individual all-around final and was second reserve athlete for the final. At the 2014 World Championships, he finished 67th in the qualification for the individual all-around final with his best apparatus performance being 72nd on pommel horse. Ukrainian men's team did not manage to qualify for men's team final as well.

Yermak had several successes at the European and students' competitions. He won a silver medal in men's team event at the 2015 European Games. At the 2015 Summer Universiade, he won a bronze medal in the team event.

He finished 15th in men's all-around final at the 2015 European Championships.

== Personal life ==
He graduated from the Kamyanets-Podilsky Ivan Ohienko National University.
