= 2015 World Artistic Gymnastics Championships – Men's qualification =

Championship

The men's qualification rounds at the 2015 World Artistic Gymnastics Championships took place on October 25–26, 2015 in the SSE Hydro in Glasgow. The top 8 teams advanced to team finals and guaranteed Olympic team berths; teams 9–16 qualified to the Olympic test event in early 2016 to compete for the final 4 team spots.

== Team ==
Rank	Team	Floor (gymnastics)	Pommel horse	Rings (gymnastics)	Vault (gymnastics)	Parallel bars	Horizontal bar	Total
1	Japan	59.632 (1)	58.632 (3)	57.966 (8)	61.132 (1)	61.623 (2)	59.899 (1)	358.884 Q
1	Naoto Hayasaka	13.133	13.633	-	15.200	-	14.533	358.884 Q
1	Ryohei Kato	-	14.566	14.300	-	13.766	15.000	358.884 Q
1	Kazuma Kaya	14.566	15.300	14.033	14.766	15.233	14.533	358.884 Q
1	Kenzo Shirai	16.100	-	14.100	15.533	15.166	-	358.884 Q
1	Yusuke Tanaka	14.800	13.433	14.766	14.166	15.758	15.000	358.884 Q
1	Kōhei Uchimura	14.166	15.133	14.800	15.633	15.466	15.366	358.884 Q
2	China	58.865 (4)	56.933 (6)	60.266 (1)	59.998 (4)	62.099 (1)	58.866 (3)	357.027 Q
2	Deng Shudi	15.366	13.400	14.600	15.233	15.533	14.700	357.027 Q
2	Lin Chaopan	14.733	14.200	13.866	15.233	15.433	13.966	357.027 Q
2	Liu Yang	13.833	-	15.866	13.133	-	-	357.027 Q
2	Xiao Ruoteng	14.600	15.133	14.300	15.166	15.033	14.466	357.027 Q
2	You Hao	-	14.200	15.500	-	15.700	14.700	357.027 Q
2	Zhang Chenglong	14.166	13.066	-	14.366	15.433	15.000	357.027 Q
3	Great Britain	59.299 (2)	59.931 (1)	58.532 (4)	60.165 (3)	59.058 (13)	57.432 (8)	354.417 Q
3	Brinn Bevan	14.466	14.666	14.233	13.866	13.500	13.033	354.417 Q
3	Daniel Purvis	14.966	14.466	14.900	15.000	15.358	14.266	354.417 Q
3	Louis Smith	-	15.533	-	-	11.966	-	354.417 Q
3	Kristian Thomas	14.633	-	13.900	15.233	-	14.666	354.417 Q
3	Max Whitlock	15.200	15.266	14.433	15.166	14.700	13.600	354.417 Q
3	Nile Wilson	14.500	13.733	14.966	14.766	15.500	14.900	354.417 Q
4	Russia	55.031 (22)	58.766 (2)	59.399 (3)	60.832 (2)	60.699 (4)	57.965 (7)	352.692 Q
4	Denis Ablyazin	12.833	-	15.400	15.533	-	-	352.692 Q
4	David Belyavskiy	13.066	14.900	14.100	15.233	15.400	14.966	352.692 Q
4	Nikita Ignatyev	14.433	12.900	15.033	14.766	13.733	14.833	352.692 Q
4	Nikolai Kuksenkov	13.066	14.800	14.466	14.933	15.333	14.800	352.692 Q
4	Nikita Nagornyy	14.466	14.533	14.500	15.133	15.333	13.366	352.692 Q
4	Ivan Stretovich	-	14.533	-	-	14.633	13.366	352.692 Q
5	United States	58.031 (6)	54.498 (19)	60.240 (2)	59.866 (5)	59.632 (8)	58.065 (6)	350.332 Q
5	Christopher Brooks	14.366	12.533	14.500	14.900	12.933	15.066	350.332 Q
5	Danell Leyva	14.366	14.433	14.400	14.500	15.633	15.566	350.332 Q
5	Alexander Naddour	14.433	15.266	14.666	14.633	-	-	350.332 Q
5	Paul Ruggeri	14.866	11.966	-	15.300	14.733	11.066	350.332 Q
5	Donnell Whittenburg	13.900	12.266	15.466	15.033	14.633	13.833	350.332 Q
5	Brandon Wynn	-	-	15.608	-	14.633	13.600	350.332 Q
6	Switzerland	58.666 (5)	56.698 (7)	56.533 (17)	59.033 (9)	60.732 (3)	58.465 (4)	350.127 Q
6	Christian Baumann	14.266	14.800	14.300	14.300	15.033	14.233	350.127 Q
6	Paolo Brägger	14.833	13.866	14.100	14.800	15.133	15.033	350.127 Q
6	Pascal Bucher	-	14.066	-	-	15.333	14.166	350.127 Q
6	Claudio Capelli	14.833	12.666	-	14.733	13.666	-	350.127 Q
6	Oliver Hegi	14.600	13.966	13.933	14.500	-	15.033	350.127 Q
6	Eddy Yusof	14.400	-	14.200	15.000	15.233	13.500	350.127 Q
7	Brazil	57.849 (7)	56.965 (5)	58.165 (6)	59.448 (8)	58.165 (14)	58.465 (4)	349.057 Q
7	Francisco Barretto Jr	14.000	14.366	13.200	14.016	14.966	12.975	349.057 Q
7	Caio Campos Souza	14.466	12.633	14.333	14.966	14.200	14.233	349.057 Q
7	Lucas de Souza Bitencourt	14.500	13.800	14.366	14.766	14.266	14.866	349.057 Q
7	Pericles Fouro da Silva	-	14.266	-	-	14.400	14.066	349.057 Q
7	Arthur Oyakawa Mariano	14.883	14.533	14.033	14.900	14.533	15.300	349.057 Q
7	Arthur Zanetti	13.666	-	15.433	14.816	-	-	349.057 Q
8	South Korea	57.665 (8)	55.598 (12)	57.065 (14)	59.632 (6)	59.841 (7)	56.365 (10)	346.166 Q
8	Kim Hansol	15.266	12.966	14.166	15.400	-	-	346.166 Q
8	Lee Jun-ho	13.633	14.066	13.966	14.766	14.600	13.633	346.166 Q
8	Lee Sangwook	13.333	11.766	13.533	-	14.766	14.066	346.166 Q
8	Park Min-soo	14.200	14.500	14.333	14.533	15.100	14.066	346.166 Q
8	Shin Donghyen	14.566	14.066	-	14.933	14.600	11.666	346.166 Q
8	Yoo Wonchu	-	-	14.600	14.100	15.375	14.600	346.166 Q
9	Germany	57.631 (9)	52.399 (23)	58.432 (5)	57.866 (15)	60.199 (5)	59.190 (2)	345.717 R
9	Andreas Bretschneider	14.566	-	14.733	13.600	14.766	15.066	345.717 R
9	Fabian Hambüchen	14.866	11.466	14.333	14.500	15.133	15.200	345.717 R
9	Philipp Herder	14.066	13.833	14.566	-	15.100	-	345.717 R
9	Sebastian Krimmer	-	13.900	-	14.300	14.766	14.266	345.717 R
9	Marcel Nguyen	14.133	11.233	14.500	14.333	15.200	14.658	345.717 R
9	Andreas Toba	13.900	13.200	14.633	14.733	-	13.966	345.717 R
10	France	56.032 ()	55.765 ()	57.699 ()	58.366 ()	60.032 (6)	56.965 ()	344.859
10	Samir Aït Saïd	12.466	-	15.566	14.733	-	-	344.859
10	Axel Augis	13.100	13.866	14.300	14.800	15.500	14.333	344.859
10	Hamilton Sabot	-	14.200	13.533	-	14.966	14.300	344.859
10	Cyril Tommasone	14.033	13.866	-	14.300	14.933	11.633	344.859
10	Arnaud Willig	14.266	13.833	13.900	14.133	14.533	14.166	344.859
10	Jim Zona	14.633	13.533	13.933	14.533	14.633	14.166	344.859
11	Netherlands	57.165 ()	54.866 ()	57.698 ()	58.598 ()	57.799 ()	55.799 ()	341.925
11	Bart Deurloo	14.666	14.600	14.033	14.866	14.300	14.000	341.925
11	Frank Rijken	13.733	13.833	13.866	14.333	13.633	13.533	341.925
11	Casimir Schmidt	14.400	13.300	14.266	14.633	14.033	12.433	341.925
11	Yuri van Gelder	-	-	15.533	-	-	-	341.925
11	Jeffrey Wammes	14.366	-	13.600	14.766	14.133	13.966	341.925
11	Epke Zonderland	-	13.133	-	-	15.333	14.300	341.925
12	Ukraine	55.057 ()	56.365 ()	58.031 ()	58.799 ()	59.265 ()	54.300 ()	341.817
12	Vladyslav Hryko	12.500	14.166	13.766	14.233	14.266	13.200	341.817
12	Volodymyr Okachev	-	13.200	13.666	-	14.533	13.400	341.817
12	Igor Radivilov	13.166	-	15.333	15.200	-	-	341.817
12	Maksym Semiankiv	13.900	-	-	-	14.333	13.400	341.817
12	Oleg Verniaiev	14.200	15.166	15.266	15.066	16.133	14.300	341.817
12	Mykyta Yermak	13.791	13.833	13.666	14.300	14.158	13.000	341.817

== Individual all-around ==
Rank	Gymnast	Nation	Floor (gymnastics)	Pommel horse	Rings (gymnastics)	Vault (gymnastics)	Parallel bars	Horizontal bar	Total	Qual.
1	Kōhei Uchimura	Japan	14.166	15.133	14.800	15.633	15.466	15.366	90.564	Q
2	Oleg Verniaiev	Ukraine	14.200	15.166	15.266	15.066	16.133	14.300	90.131	Q
3	Daniel Purvis	Great Britain	14.966	14.466	14.900	15.000	15.358	14.266	88.956	Q
4	Danell Leyva	United States	14.366	14.433	14.400	14.500	15.633	15.566	88.898	Q
5	Deng Shudi	China	15.366	13.400	14.600	15.233	15.533	14.700	88.832	Q
6	Xiao Ruoteng	China	14.600	15.133	14.300	15.166	15.033	14.466	88.698	Q
7	Manrique Larduet	Cuba	15.166	14.000	14.933	13.833	15.666	15.058	88.656	Q
8	Kazuma Kaya	Japan	14.566	15.300	14.033	14.766	15.233	14.533	88.431	Q
9	Max Whitlock	Great Britain	15.200	15.266	14.433	15.166	14.700	13.600	88.365	Q
10	Nile Wilson	Great Britain	14.500	13.733	14.966	14.766	15.500	14.900	88.365	-
11	Arthur Oyakawa Mariano	Brazil	14.883	14.533	14.033	14.900	14.533	15.300	88.182	Q
12	Yusuke Tanaka	Japan	14.800	13.433	14.766	14.166	15.758	15.000	87.923	-
13	Pablo Brägger	Switzerland	14.833	13.866	14.100	14.800	15.133	15.033	87.765	Q
14	David Belyavskiy	Russia	13.066	14.900	14.100	15.233	15.400	14.966	87.665	Q
15	Lin Chaopan	China	14.733	14.200	13.866	15.233	15.433	13.966	87.431	-
16	Nikolai Kuksenkov	Russia	13.066	14.800	14.466	14.933	15.333	14.800	87.398	Q
17	Nikita Nagornyy	Russia	14.466	14.533	14.500	15.133	15.333	13.366	87.331	-
18	Christian Baumann	Switzerland	14.266	14.800	14.300	14.300	15.033	14.233	86.932	Q
19	Park Min-soo	South Korea	14.200	14.500	14.333	14.533	15.100	14.066	86.732	Q
20	Lucas de Souza Bitencourt	Brazil	14.500	13.800	14.366	14.766	14.266	14.866	86.564	Q
21	Bart Deurloo	Netherlands	14.666	14.600	14.033	14.866	14.300	14.000	86.465	Q
22	Dzmitry Barkalau	Belarus	14.700	14.333	14.200	14.366	14.533	14.133	86.265	Q
23	Axel Augis	France	13.100	13.866	14.300	14.800	15.500	14.333	85.899	Q
24	Nikita Ignatyev	Russia	14.433	12.900	15.033	14.766	13.733	14.833	85.698	-
25	Ruben Lopez	Spain	13.766	13.433	14.133	15.033	15.000	14.233	85.598	Q
26	Andrey Likhovitskiy	Belarus	14.333	14.633	13.700	14.066	14.900	13.966	85.598	Q
27	Fabian Hambüchen	Germany	14.866	11.466	14.333	14.500	15.133	15.200	85.498	Q
28	Cristian Bățagă	Romania	14.266	14.333	14.700	14.566	14.500	13.066	85.431	Q
29	Jim Zona	France	14.633	13.533	13.933	14.533	14.633	14.166	85.431	Q
30	Florian Landuyt	Belgium	14.100	13.733	13.966	14.600	14.666	14.133	85.198	R
31	Donnell Whittenburg	United States	13.900	12.266	15.466	15.033	14.633	13.833	85.131	R
32	Artur Davtyan	Armenia	14.108	14.000	14.600	14.700	14.400	13.166	84.974	R
33	Filip Ude	Croatia	13.966	14.900	13.600	14.333	14.233	13.833	84.865	R
34	Caio Campos Souza	Brazil	6.500 14.466 (39)	6.100 12.633 (167)	6.400 14.333 (50)	5.600 14.966 (25)	6.500 14.200 (103)	6.200 14.233 (37)	84.831	
35	Arnaud Willig	France	5.900 14.266 (52)	5.300 13.833 (68)	5.700 13.900 (94)	5.200 14.133 (125)	5.800 14.533 (69)	5.900 14.166 (41)	84.831	
36	Wai Hung Shek	Hong Kong	5.700 14.150 (65)	5.300 13.533 (95)	4.800 13.366 (146)	6.000 15.300 (7)	6.500 15.233 (25)	5.500 13.233 (134)	84.815	
37	Andrei Vasile Muntean	Romania	6.400 14.233 (59)	5.400 12.533 (175)	6.400 14.933 (17)	6.000 15.300 (7)	6.200 15.000 (39)	5.700 12.766 (164)	84.765	
38	Junho Lee	South Korea	6.000 13.633 (120)	5.700 14.066 (47)	5.200 13.966 (80)	5.600 14.766 (41)	5.800 14.600 (62)	5.700 13.633 (83)	84.664	
39	Tomas González	Chile	6.800 15.200 (5)	5.100 13.066 (136)	5.700 13.600 (124)	5.600 14.966 (25)	5.900 14.533 (70)	5.300 13.266 (129)	84.631	
40	Alberto Tallon Fernández	Spain	6.000 14.566 (30)	5.600 13.566 (93)	6.200 13.866 (101)	5.600 14.833 (35)	5.600 14.133 (108)	5.400 13.566 (90)	84.53	
41	Daniel Corral	Mexico	6.400 14.900 (9)	6.000 13.600 (90)	6.300 13.100 (163)	5.600 13.633 (170)	6.800 15.333 (22)	5.400 13.833 (64)	84.399	
42	Chih Kai Lee	Chinese Taipei	6.100 14.600 (28)	6.100 14.566 (22)	4.600 12.933 (175)	5.600 14.566 (62)	5.700 14.733 (52)	5.300 12.933 (155)	84.331	
43	Christopher Brooks	United States	6.000 14.366 (45)	5.800 12.533 (176)	5.900 14.500 (41)	5.600 14.900 (29)	6.400 12.933 (187)	6.800 15.066 (6)	84.298	
44	Gustavo Palma Simoes	Portugal	5.800 13.433 (143)	6.200 13.733 (80)	6.000 14.700 (24)	5.200 14.500 (71)	5.600 14.100 (110)	5.500 13.666 (81)	84.132	
45	René Cournoyer	Canada	6.000 14.233 (57)	5.700 13.991 (55)	5.500 13.966 (81)	5.600 13.600 (175)	5.500 14.466 (76)	5.400 13.833 (64)	84.089	
46	Nikolaos Iliopoulos	Greece	5.400 13.733 (108)	5.600 13.533 (97)	5.500 13.700 (111)	5.200 14.533 (64)	6.000 14.866 (46)	5.200 13.700 (77)	84.065	
47	Marcel Nguyen	Germany	6.000 14.133 (67)	5.000 11.233 (210)	6.100 14.500 (42)	5.200 14.333 (88)	6.700 15.200 (29)	6.700 14.658 (21)	84.057	
48	Mikhail Koudinov	New Zealand	6.000 14.066 (78)	5.100 13.566 (92)	5.200 13.600 (122)	5.200 14.100 (134)	6.600 15.266 (23)	5.300 13.433 (110)	84.031	
49	Brinn Bevan	United Kingdom	6.000 14.466 (37)	6.500 14.666 (19)	5.800 14.233 (58)	6.000 13.866 (157)	6.100 13.500 (157)	5.700 13.033 (149)	83.764	
50	David Jessen	Czech Republic	5.700 13.766 (105)	5.500 14.100 (46)	4.900 13.433 (138)	5.200 14.033 (144)	5.800 14.666 (55)	5.600 13.766 (74)	83.764	
51	Néstor Abad	Spain	6.100 14.633 (21)	6.100 13.500 (99)	6.000 14.566 (35)	5.600 13.566 (179)	6.400 14.900 (45)	6.400 12.566 (176)	83.731	
52	Marian Drăgulescu	Romania	6.700 13.666 (116)	6.100 13.300 (117)	5.100 13.800 (105)	6.000 15.400 (5)	5.800 14.300 (92)	5.900 13.233 (135)	83.699	
53	Ferhat Arıcan	Turkey	5.800 13.600 (125)	6.100 13.700 (83)	5.400 13.833 (104)	5.600 13.633 (170)	6.600 15.333 (19)	5.500 13.600 (88)	83.699	
54	Marios Georgiou	Cyprus	5.600 13.300 (154)	6.000 13.766 (75)	5.400 13.666 (115)	5.200 14.433 (76)	5.500 14.266 (96)	5.600 14.166 (40)	83.597	
55	Francisco Barretto Júnior	Brazil	5.500 14.000 (84)	6.200 14.366 (32)	5.900 13.200 (160)	4.800 14.016 (148)	6.400 14.966 (41)	6.800 12.975 (154)	83.523	
56	Stian Skjerahaug	Norway	5.600 14.166 (62)	5.900 14.033 (51)	5.100 13.900 (90)	5.200 14.433 (76)	5.300 13.433 (162)	5.300 13.533 (94)	83.498	
57	J. O. Calvo Moreno	Colombia	6.500 12.666 (199)	6.400 14.066 (50)	6.200 13.766 (109)	5.600 14.166 (116)	6.900 15.133 (34)	6.700 13.466 (106)	83.263	
58	Robert Tvorogal	Lithuania	5.100 13.233 (157)	5.400 13.900 (62)	5.000 13.333 (148)	5.200 14.266 (103)	5.800 14.466 (77)	5.400 14.033 (52)	83.231	
59	Rokas Guščinas	Lithuania	4.900 13.633 (117)	6.000 14.733 (16)	5.600 14.400 (45)	4.800 13.866 (157)	5.400 14.000 (115)	5.600 12.566 (175)	83.198	
60	Casimir Schmidt	Netherlands	6.600 14.400 (44)	5.600 13.300 (116)	5.800 14.266 (56)	5.600 14.633 (57)	5.500 14.033 (113)	5.100 12.433 (182)	83.065	
61	Oskar Kirmes	Finland	5.900 14.233 (55)	5.400 13.666 (84)	5.300 14.133 (66)	4.800 13.566 (179)	5.300 13.933 (120)	5.500 13.466 (103)	82.997	
62	Frank Rijken	Netherlands	5.900 13.733 (110)	5.500 13.833 (69)	5.100 13.866 (97)	5.200 14.333 (88)	6.100 13.633 (147)	5.300 13.533 (94)	82.931	
63	Randy Lerú	Cuba	6.600 12.366 (212)	5.600 13.166 (127)	5.700 13.400 (145)	5.600 14.900 (29)	6.700 14.500 (75)	6.900 14.533 (25)	82.865	
64	Nestor Rodriguez Colon	Puerto Rico	5.300 12.466 (205)	6.000 13.900 (64)	6.100 14.033 (76)	5.200 13.966 (152)	6.300 14.500 (74)	6.100 13.933 (63)	82.798	
65	Maxime Gentges	Belgium	5.700 13.433 (141)	5.600 13.700 (81)	5.500 14.166 (64)	5.200 14.400 (80)	5.700 13.933 (122)	5.900 13.166 (141)	82.798	
66	Paolo Principi	Italy	6.000 14.300 (50)	6.100 12.666 (165)	5.500 14.300 (51)	5.200 14.091 (139)	5.100 13.566 (151)	6.000 13.833 (69)	82.756	
67	Mykyta Yermak	Ukraine	5.600 13.791 (103)	6.300 13.833 (72)	5.700 13.666 (116)	5.200 14.300 (95)	5.400 14.158 (105)	5.200 13.000 (152)	82.748	
68	Kieran Behan	Ireland	6.100 14.633 (21)	4.200 11.833 (197)	5.600 14.066 (73)	5.200 14.000 (149)	5.200 14.266 (95)	5.000 13.766 (73)	82.564	
69	Tomas Kuzmickas	Lithuania	6.300 14.133 (66)	4.700 13.033 (139)	4.600 13.066 (164)	5.200 14.233 (107)	5.700 14.300 (91)	5.500 13.700 (78)	82.465	
70	Vid Hidvégi	Hungary	5.300 13.400 (147)	6.600 15.166 (7)	5.300 13.500 (135)	4.400 13.266 (201)	5.200 13.833 (126)	5.400 13.300 (127)	82.465	
71	Oleg Stepko	Azerbaijan	5.900 13.300 (155)	6.000 12.300 (183)	6.200 13.933 (89)	5.600 13.566 (179)	7.000 15.700 (3)	5.900 13.500 (101)	82.299	
72	Andrew Smith	Ireland	6.200 13.733 (111)	5.100 13.466 (100)	4.800 13.333 (147)	5.200 14.266 (103)	5.400 14.100 (109)	5.300 13.333 (121)	82.231	
73	Ryan Patterson	South Africa	6.000 14.600 (26)	4.800 12.633 (166)	5.000 13.433 (139)	5.200 14.300 (95)	5.600 13.466 (160)	5.500 13.700 (78)	82.132	
74	Vladyslav Hryko	Ukraine	5.500 12.500 (204)	5.900 14.166 (45)	5.300 13.766 (107)	5.200 14.233 (107)	5.900 14.266 (99)	5.300 13.200 (138)	82.131	
75	Anton Fokin	Uzbekistan	5.500 14.033 (80)	5.300 13.733 (76)	6.000 13.966 (83)	5.200 14.133 (125)	6.800 13.933 (123)	5.100 12.100 (197)	81.898	
76	Norbert Dudas	Hungary	5.000 13.100 (165)	5.600 13.600 (88)	5.700 13.933 (87)	5.200 14.266 (103)	5.700 13.833 (127)	5.100 13.166 (140)	81.898	
77	Alexander Shatilov	Israel	6.700 14.133 (71)	5.600 13.266 (121)	5.300 13.900 (91)	5.200 14.533 (64)	5.800 14.266 (98)	5.900 11.766 (204)	81.864	
78	Ludovico Edalli	Italy	5.900 13.133 (163)	5.700 13.533 (98)	5.400 13.866 (98)	5.200 14.366 (84)	6.100 13.400 (163)	6.200 13.533 (98)	81.831	
79	Bram Louwije	Belgium	5.600 12.700 (196)	5.600 14.300 (35)	5.100 13.633 (119)	5.200 14.100 (134)	5.600 13.300 (169)	5.700 13.766 (75)	81.799	
80	Reiss Beckford	Jamaica	6.000 14.066 (77)	5.300 13.333 (113)	6.000 14.200 (62)	5.600 13.733 (166)	5.400 13.566 (152)	6.400 12.900 (156)	81.798	
81	Nicola Bartolini	Italy	6.300 13.800 (102)	5.800 13.933 (58)	5.100 13.500 (133)	5.600 13.566 (179)	5.900 14.366 (86)	5.300 12.533 (178)	81.698	
82	Phuoc Hung Pham	Vietnam	5.900 12.800 (190)	5.000 13.366 (111)	6.400 14.233 (59)	5.200 12.833 (221)	6.700 15.200 (29)	5.400 13.133 (143)	81.565	
83	Mohamed Abdeldjalil Bourguieg	Algeria	5.800 14.100 (73)	4.500 12.966 (140)	5.100 13.333 (149)	5.600 14.733 (48)	5.400 12.966 (182)	4.900 13.433 (107)	81.531	
84	Tarik Soto Byfield	Costa Rica	6.200 14.133 (69)	5.100 12.800 (155)	4.500 13.000 (166)	5.400 14.800 (38)	4.800 13.333 (167)	5.600 13.300 (128)	81.366	
85	Nicolás Córdoba	Argentina	5.400 13.500 (134)	5.300 12.966 (143)	5.100 13.433 (140)	4.800 13.800 (162)	4.800 13.566 (149)	6.400 13.966 (58)	81.231	
86	Heikki Niva	Finland	5.300 13.566 (126)	5.200 12.900 (150)	5.100 13.433 (140)	4.400 13.633 (170)	5.600 14.333 (88)	5.400 13.333 (123)	81.198	
87	Bernardo da Costa Almeida	Portugal	5.400 13.533 (132)	5.200 12.933 (145)	5.300 13.733 (110)	4.400 13.233 (205)	5.400 14.133 (106)	5.400 13.566 (90)	81.131	
88	Naoya Tsukahara	Australia	5.000 12.866 (183)	5.400 13.466 (101)	6.100 13.866 (100)	5.200 14.166 (116)	6.000 13.266 (171)	5.300 13.500 (99)	81.13	
89	Eduard Shaulov	Uzbekistan	6.000 14.100 (75)	4.800 13.066 (135)	4.700 12.766 (186)	5.200 14.333 (88)	5.400 13.933 (121)	4.700 12.766 (163)	80.964	
90	Federico Molinari	Argentina	4.900 13.466 (136)	4.100 11.700 (200)	6.700 14.900 (20)	5.200 13.166 (208)	5.600 14.366 (84)	5.100 13.300 (126)	80.898	
91	Rakesh Patra	India	5.000 13.033 (172)	4.300 12.233 (186)	5.800 13.866 (99)	5.200 14.233 (107)	5.800 14.366 (85)	4.900 13.133 (142)	80.864	
92	Jimmy Verbaeys	Belgium	5.900 13.766 (106)	4.900 12.133 (191)	5.400 13.333 (151)	5.200 14.166 (116)	6.200 14.866 (47)	5.500 12.500 (180)	80.764	
93	Alexis Torres	Puerto Rico	6.100 13.633 (121)	5.600 12.666 (164)	6.500 14.266 (57)	5.200 14.166 (116)	6.200 13.733 (135)	5.000 12.300 (188)	80.764	
94	Adam Babos	Hungary	5.800 13.866 (95)	5.600 13.666 (85)	5.400 13.900 (92)	4.400 13.400 (195)	5.400 13.966 (118)	4.900 11.933 (199)	80.731	
95	Slavomir Michnak	Slovakia	5.300 13.400 (147)	6.300 14.400 (31)	4.400 13.200 (157)	4.400 13.533 (184)	5.300 12.500 (202)	5.100 13.433 (108)	80.466	
96	Audrys Nin Reyes	Dominican Republic	6.200 13.483 (135)	4.900 12.900 (147)	5.400 12.300 (200)	6.000 14.733 (48)	5.500 13.133 (176)	6.000 13.833 (69)	80.382	
97	Ahmed Aldyani	Qatar	4.900 12.933 (179)	6.000 14.233 (40)	5.100 12.700 (190)	5.200 13.666 (168)	5.600 13.466 (160)	5.300 13.366 (116)	80.364	
98	Fabian Leimlehner	Austria	5.500 13.566 (129)	5.000 11.633 (201)	5.200 13.800 (106)	5.200 14.233 (107)	5.900 14.300 (94)	5.700 12.800 (162)	80.332	
99	Dávid Vecsernyés	Hungary	5.200 13.066 (167)	5.300 13.266 (120)	4.800 13.400 (143)	4.400 13.166 (208)	5.500 14.166 (104)	6.500 13.266 (131)	80.33	
100	İbrahim Çolak	Turkey	5.400 13.566 (127)	4.000 12.133 (189)	6.700 15.100 (13)	4.400 13.433 (193)	5.300 13.266 (170)	4.400 12.733 (165)	80.231	
101	Carlos Calvo	Colombia	5.600 12.100 (217)	5.600 11.933 (195)	6.200 12.933 (179)	5.200 14.333 (88)	6.200 14.666 (56)	6.100 14.233 (34)	80.198	
102	Jay Hugh Smith	Canada	5.800 14.100 (73)	6.000 13.733 (79)	5.700 13.666 (116)	5.600 14.666 (55)	5.200 13.966 (117)	4.200 10.066 (229)	80.197	
103	Artem Dolgopyat	Israel	6.400 13.533 (133)	5.900 13.466 (102)	3.800 11.566 (216)	5.200 14.533 (64)	5.200 13.633 (143)	5.300 13.466 (102)	80.197	
104	Robert Tee Kriangkum	Thailand	5.800 13.566 (131)	5.300 12.500 (177)	5.500 12.933 (178)	5.200 14.400 (80)	5.500 13.666 (141)	5.200 13.100 (146)	80.165	
105	Alen Dimic	Slovenia	5.300 13.133 (161)	5.200 12.933 (145)	5.100 13.000 (168)	5.200 13.933 (153)	5.900 13.133 (177)	6.100 14.033 (53)	80.165	
106	Jong Hyok Han	North Korea	4.600 11.466 (230)	5.200 12.966 (142)	5.900 13.266 (156)	5.200 14.416 (79)	6.900 14.433 (80)	6.300 13.566 (93)	80.113	
107	Paolo Ottavi	Italy	5.500 11.800 (223)	5.000 13.300 (114)	5.900 14.000 (78)	4.800 13.800 (162)	5.100 13.033 (180)	5.900 13.833 (68)	79.766	
108	Christos Lympanovnos	Greece	5.300 13.000 (177)	5.300 11.900 (196)	5.800 14.200 (60)	5.200 13.766 (165)	5.500 13.500 (155)	5.000 13.300 (125)	79.666	
109	Marcus Conradi	Norway	5.900 12.766 (193)	5.400 12.600 (170)	5.300 13.466 (137)	5.200 14.033 (144)	4.700 13.366 (164)	5.300 13.400 (112)	79.631	
110	Yordan Aleksandrov	Bulgaria	5.400 13.600 (124)	5.000 11.600 (203)	5.200 13.400 (144)	4.800 14.000 (149)	5.200 13.600 (148)	5.700 13.400 (113)	79.6	
111	Tristian Perez Rivera	Puerto Rico	5.700 14.033 (82)	5.600 13.600 (88)	4.800 12.200 (207)	5.200 14.033 (144)	5.700 13.733 (133)	4.900 11.833 (201)	79.432	
112	Samuel Piasecký	Slovakia	5.200 12.433 (207)	5.000 12.466 (179)	4.800 12.933 (176)	4.400 13.366 (196)	5.500 14.400 (82)	5.800 13.833 (67)	79.431	
113	Dzianis Sanuvonh	Belarus	6.100 13.800 (101)	5.100 12.900 (148)	4.800 12.900 (180)	5.200 14.133 (125)	5.100 12.966 (181)	5.400 12.666 (169)	79.365	
114	Michael Trane	Sweden	5.100 13.466 (137)	4.300 12.566 (171)	4.900 12.966 (170)	4.400 13.500 (187)	5.200 13.866 (124)	4.500 12.866 (157)	79.23	
115	Hellal Metidji	Algeria	5.100 13.133 (160)	5.400 13.766 (74)	4.600 13.000 (167)	5.200 14.166 (116)	4.500 11.733 (224)	5.500 13.366 (117)	79.164	
116	Phuong Thanh Dinh	Vietnam	5.500 12.866 (184)	5.200 13.433 (104)	3.800 12.066 (209)	5.200 13.900 (154)	6.200 14.366 (87)	5.300 12.533 (178)	79.164	
117	Chao Wei Yu	Chinese Taipei	4.800 12.400 (208)	4.300 12.800 (154)	5.600 13.300 (153)	4.400 13.633 (170)	5.600 14.266 (97)	5.000 12.700 (166)	79.099	
118	Devy Dyson	New Zealand	5.000 13.033 (171)	5.400 12.900 (151)	5.900 13.966 (82)	4.400 13.266 (201)	5.100 12.366 (207)	5.200 13.433 (109)	78.964	
119	Ko Chiang Huang	Chinese Taipei	5.400 13.633 (118)	5.500 13.400 (108)	5.100 12.733 (187)	5.200 14.133 (125)	5.400 13.700 (138)	4.000 11.333 (216)	78.932	
120	Nikolay Nam	Kazakhstan	5.900 13.133 (162)	5.300 13.133 (132)	4.800 13.200 (158)	5.200 14.400 (80)	5.000 11.766 (223)	5.700 13.266 (130)	78.898	
121	Petro Pakhnyuk	Azerbaijan	6.400 14.266 (54)	6.400 13.600 (91)	5.700 12.700 (191)	5.600 13.300 (200)	6.500 12.700 (195)	5.700 12.233 (189)	78.799	
122	Vinzenz Hoeck	Austria	4.800 11.733 (224)	4.600 12.966 (141)	6.500 14.633 (30)	5.200 13.200 (206)	5.200 13.466 (159)	5.200 12.800 (161)	78.798	
123	M. S. El Saharty	Egypt	5.500 13.333 (151)	5.500 13.133 (134)	5.700 13.566 (126)	5.200 14.066 (140)	5.600 12.133 (212)	5.300 12.566 (173)	78.797	
124	Daniel Radovesnicky	Czech Republic	5.500 13.400 (149)	4.800 13.133 (130)	4.900 12.866 (183)	4.400 13.266 (201)	5.100 13.666 (140)	4.900 12.433 (181)	78.764	
125	Luke Wiwatowski	Australia	5.500 13.400 (146)	4.100 11.300 (209)	5.200 13.500 (134)	5.200 14.100 (134)	5.900 12.333 (210)	6.400 14.100 (47)	78.733	
126	Simao Almeida	Portugal	5.800 12.700 (195)	4.100 11.033 (215)	5.600 13.766 (108)	5.200 14.166 (116)	5.800 13.800 (129)	4.800 13.233 (132)	78.698	
127	Ilya Kornev	Kazakhstan	5.700 13.441 (139)	5.000 10.900 (219)	5.700 13.433 (142)	5.200 14.066 (140)	5.700 13.800 (128)	5.700 13.033 (149)	78.673	
128	Amr Essam Mohamed Ahmed	Egypt	5.300 13.466 (138)	5.600 13.400 (109)	4.800 12.266 (202)	4.400 13.533 (184)	5.000 13.666 (139)	5.300 12.166 (194)	78.497	
129	Marcus Frandsen	Denmark	5.300 13.700 (112)	5.100 13.200 (122)	4.700 13.033 (165)	5.200 12.466 (226)	4.200 13.133 (174)	4.500 12.866 (157)	78.398	
130	Lukas Kranzlmueller	Austria	5.700 12.700 (197)	4.400 12.700 (159)	5.200 13.600 (122)	5.200 13.600 (175)	5.500 14.200 (102)	4.600 11.533 (213)	78.333	
131	Dmitrijs Trefilovs	Latvia	5.200 13.033 (173)	6.000 14.300 (36)	4.800 13.300 (152)	4.400 13.500 (187)	5.000 13.466 (158)	5.600 10.733 (224)	78.332	
132	David Bishop	New Zealand	5.800 12.600 (200)	4.600 12.700 (160)	4.000 12.400 (196)	4.800 13.900 (154)	3.800 13.166 (173)	5.300 13.333 (121)	78.099	
133	Martin Angelov	Bulgaria	6.000 13.833 (98)	4.600 11.366 (207)	3.500 12.233 (203)	5.600 15.000 (22)	4.700 13.133 (175)	4.400 12.533 (177)	78.098	
134	Bojan Dejanovic	Serbia	4.900 12.775 (191)	4.800 12.733 (157)	4.200 11.933 (211)	5.200 14.300 (95)	4.800 12.600 (200)	5.100 13.666 (80)	78.007	
135	Martin Konečný	Czech Republic	5.500 13.700 (113)	5.100 13.266 (119)	4.500 12.200 (206)	4.000 11.200 (230)	5.400 13.633 (145)	6.400 13.966 (58)	77.965	
136	Thanh Tung Le	Vietnam	5.800 12.366 (211)	3.5	5.500 13.700 (111)	6.000 14.900 (29)	6.600 14.466 (79)	5.400 13.133 (143)	77.898	
137	Ping Chien Hsu	Chinese Taipei	5.400 13.566 (127)	5.700 12.800 (156)	5.400 13.200 (159)	5.200 14.166 (116)	5.700 13.366 (165)	4.500 10.766 (222)	77.864	
138	Junior Rojo Mendoza	Venezuela	5.600 13.433 (142)	3.800 10.966 (216)	5.100 12.966 (171)	5.600 14.833 (35)	5.900 13.500 (156)	5.300 12.166 (194)	77.864	
139	Mohamed Reghib	Algeria	4.700 12.766 (192)	5.100 13.133 (131)	4.500 12.966 (169)	4.400 12.900 (220)	5.100 12.566 (201)	6.000 13.466 (105)	77.797	
140	Ahmed Ashraf Elmaraghy	Egypt	5.300 13.300 (153)	5.100 12.900 (148)	5.300 12.833 (185)	4.800 13.866 (157)	5.200 13.100 (178)	4.900 11.600 (212)	77.599	
141	Milos Paunovic	Serbia	5.100 12.900 (180)	4.700 12.566 (172)	5.300 13.333 (150)	5.200 14.100 (134)	4.800 12.900 (189)	5.100 11.700 (206)	77.499	
142	Pietro Giachino	Norway	5.300 12.700 (194)	5.700 13.933 (57)	4.300 11.866 (212)	4.400 12.400 (227)	4.900 12.800 (190)	5.700 13.633 (83)	77.332	
143	Adam Rzepa	Poland	5.200 11.866 (220)	5.500 13.633 (86)	4.300 12.333 (198)	4.400 13.466 (191)	4.900 13.566 (150)	5.600 12.333 (187)	77.197	
144	Christian Bruno Decidet	Chile	5.300 13.033 (174)	4.800 10.466 (221)	5.500 13.100 (161)	5.200 14.233 (107)	5.000 12.800 (191)	5.400 13.533 (96)	77.165	
145	Daniel Aguero Barrera	Peru	6.200 14.033 (83)	4.900 12.600 (168)	4.700 12.866 (182)	5.200 14.300 (95)	5.300 11.800 (222)	4.900 11.500 (215)	77.099	
146	Osvaldo Martínez Erazun	Argentina	5.400 13.733 (108)	3.700 11.033 (214)	5.200 13.466 (136)	4.800 12.666 (224)	5.600 12.666 (197)	5.500 13.533 (97)	77.097	
147	Zi Jie Gabriel Gan	Singapore	4.500 12.800 (188)	5.700 13.700 (82)	3.600 11.666 (215)	4.400 13.366 (196)	4.100 13.333 (166)	4.300 11.933 (198)	76.798	
148	Joao Fuglsig	Denmark	5.200 13.266 (156)	4.300 12.533 (173)	4.700 13.266 (155)	4.800 12.300 (228)	4.600 12.600 (198)	4.200 12.633 (170)	76.598	
149	Juan Raffo	Chile	5.200 13.166 (158)	5.400 12.700 (161)	5.500 13.100 (161)	5.200 14.200 (113)	4.200 11.533 (227)	3.300 11.666 (207)	76.365	
150	Stepan Gorbachev	Kazakhstan	5.500 13.433 (140)	5.100 12.533 (174)	3.300 11.233 (220)	5.200 14.533 (64)	4.900 11.266 (232)	6.000 13.333 (124)	76.331	
151	Jack Neill	Ireland	5.400 13.300 (152)	5.100 12.866 (153)	3.700 12.266 (201)	4.400 13.000 (218)	4.000 12.700 (194)	3.500 12.100 (196)	76.232	
152	Christopher Soos	Sweden	5.600 13.833 (96)	5.000 10.666 (220)	4.800 12.700 (188)	5.200 14.200 (113)	5.000 13.500 (154)	4.800 11.266 (217)	76.165	
153	Vitalijs Kardasovs	Latvia	5.400 13.800 (100)	4.3	4.500 12.833 (184)	5.200 14.533 (64)	5.200 12.300 (211)	5.200 12.700 (167)	75.532	
154	Javier Balboa Gonzalez	Mexico	5.400 12.966 (178)	5.200 10.100 (225)	6.300 13.566 (128)	5.200 14.066 (140)	6.000 12.933 (186)	5.700 11.800 (202)	75.431	
155	Petar Velickovic	Serbia	5.200 13.400 (145)	4.900 12.666 (162)	4.300 12.200 (204)	4.400 13.333 (199)	4.200 12.900 (188)	4.100 10.733 (223)	75.232	
156	Abderrazak Nasser	Morocco	5.100 11.825 (222)	4.900 13.433 (103)	4.400 12.200 (205)	5.200 14.233 (107)	4.100 11.800 (220)	4.100 11.733 (205)	75.224	
157	Aleksandar Batinkov	Bulgaria	5.600 13.683 (114)	4.6	5.000 12.900 (181)	5.200 13.733 (166)	5.700 12.433 (206)	6.100 13.766 (76)	75.048	
158	Aleksejs Pajada	Latvia	5.000 12.366 (209)	4.200 11.166 (212)	3.900 12.600 (193)	5.200 14.133 (125)	4.800 13.233 (172)	4.700 11.533 (214)	75.031	
159	Ashish Kumar	India	6.400 13.616 (123)	5.600 11.633 (202)	4.600 10.566 (225)	5.600 14.433 (76)	5.100 12.600 (199)	4.400 12.166 (192)	75.014	
160	Siddharth Verma	India	4.800 12.800 (189)	5.700 13.066 (138)	9.400 (233)	5.200 13.266 (201)	5.200 13.633 (143)	4.600 12.833 (160)	74.998	
161	Erdenebold Ganbat	Mongolia	5.200 11.833 (221)	4.700 12.166 (187)	5.300 12.633 (192)	5.600 14.733 (48)	4.900 13.333 (168)	4.400 10.166 (227)	74.864	
162	Tiaan Grobler	South Africa	5.200 13.033 (170)	3.500 10.200 (223)	4.600 12.533 (194)	4.400 13.466 (191)	4.700 12.933 (184)	4.600 12.633 (171)	74.798	
163	R. H. Bonilla Ruiz	Mexico	4.500 12.166 (214)	4.400 10.233 (222)	5.500 12.366 (197)	4.400 13.000 (218)	5.700 14.000 (116)	5.500 13.000 (153)	74.765	
164	Paata Nozadze	Georgia	5.200 12.666 (198)	3.8	4.900 13.866 (96)	4.400 13.600 (175)	4.500 12.933 (183)	3.500 11.866 (200)	74.764	
165	Caleb Faulk	Jamaica	5.400 11.633 (226)	4.000 12.133 (189)	5.300 12.966 (173)	4.400 13.166 (208)	4.300 12.100 (214)	5.600 12.366 (185)	74.364	
166	Hamza Hossaini	Morocco	5.100 11.466 (231)	4.100 12.233 (185)	4.700 11.833 (213)	4.800 13.100 (212)	5.200 12.666 (196)	4.700 12.866 (159)	74.164	
167	Joachim Winther	Denmark	4.900 12.866 (182)	4.600 11.966 (193)	4.500 11.166 (221)	4.400 12.800 (222)	4.800 11.900 (218)	4.700 13.000 (151)	73.698	
168	Jostyn Fuenmayor Berroeta	Venezuela	5.300 13.033 (174)	5.900 11.200 (211)	4.000 10.066 (228)	5.200 14.133 (125)	5.400 12.333 (209)	4.800 12.366 (184)	73.131	
169	Kai Cheng Timothy Tay	Singapore	5.400 12.833 (186)	3.900 10.900 (217)	4.400 12.033 (210)	4.400 13.500 (187)	4.700 11.500 (228)	4.800 12.166 (193)	72.932	
170	José Luis Fuentes	Venezuela	4.300 10.733 (233)	6.100 13.300 (117)	5.100 11.300 (218)	4.400 12.700 (223)	5.900 13.733 (134)	5.100 11.100 (218)	72.866	
171	Andreas Bretschneider	Germany	6.100 14.566 (33)		6.300 14.733 (23)	5.600 13.600 (175)	6.500 14.766 (51)	6.600 15.066 (5)	72.731	
172	Eddy Yusof	Switzerland	6.300 14.400 (43)		6.100 14.200 (63)	6.000 15.000 (22)	6.400 15.233 (24)	5.500 13.500 (100)	72.333	
173	Oliver Hegi	Switzerland	6.000 14.600 (26)	5.900 13.966 (56)	5.500 13.933 (85)	5.200 14.500 (71)		6.500 15.033 (8)	72.032	
174	Chenglong Zhang	China	6.300 14.166 (63)	5.100 13.066 (136)		5.200 14.366 (84)	6.500 15.433 (11)	7.400 15.000 (12)	72.031	
175	Kevin Lytwyn	Canada	6.400 14.133 (70)		6.200 14.600 (32)	5.600 14.766 (41)	5.900 14.466 (78)	6.800 14.033 (54)	71.998	
176	Luis Pizarro Silva	Peru	5.500 12.366 (210)	5.700 11.833 (198)	3.100 10.100 (227)	4.400 13.433 (193)	5.800 12.133 (213)	4.400 11.633 (210)	71.498	
177	Alexandru Andrei Ursache	Romania	6.000 14.133 (67)	6.500 14.466 (29)	5.500 14.133 (67)	5.200 14.300 (95)	5.800 14.300 (92)		71.332	
178	Jeffrey Wammes	Netherlands	6.300 14.366 (48)		5.700 13.600 (124)	5.600 14.766 (41)	5.500 14.133 (107)	5.900 13.966 (56)	70.831	
179	J. A. Munoz Perez	Colombia	5.700 14.000 (85)	6.300 14.233 (41)		5.200 14.000 (149)	5.900 14.566 (65)	6.200 13.966 (57)	70.765	
180	Adria Vera Mora	Spain	6.300 14.633 (24)	5.300 13.400 (107)	5.500 14.133 (67)	5.600 14.900 (29)		5.900 13.466 (104)	70.532	
181	Kevin Crovetto	Monaco	3.900 11.966 (218)	4.000 12.300 (181)	3.200 11.366 (217)	2.000 11.000 (231)	4.100 12.766 (193)	4.200 11.066 (219)	70.464	
182	Andreas Toba	Germany	5.700 13.900 (92)	6.000 13.200 (125)	6.400 14.633 (29)	5.600 14.733 (48)		6.600 13.966 (61)	70.432	
183	Jorge Giraldo	Colombia		6.000 14.000 (53)	6.000 13.933 (88)	5.200 13.200 (206)	6.400 15.200 (28)	5.800 13.800 (72)	70.133	
184	Donghyen Shin	South Korea	6.000 14.566 (30)	6.000 14.066 (48)		5.600 14.933 (27)	5.800 14.600 (62)	5.300 11.666 (208)	69.831	
185	Otgonbat Purevdorj	Mongolia	5.300 11.500 (229)	4.500 10.166 (224)	4.400 11.266 (219)	5.600 13.800 (162)	4.700 12.775 (192)	4.500 10.166 (228)	69.673	
186	Kiu Chung Ng	Hong Kong	8.933 (237)	4.200 11.500 (205)	5.200 12.966 (172)	5.600 13.100 (212)	5.700 11.500 (229)	2.900 11.633 (209)	69.632	
187	Dimitrios Markousis	Greece	6.600 14.500 (36)		5.300 13.533 (130)	5.200 14.266 (103)	5.400 13.966 (118)	5.200 13.200 (137)	69.465	
188	Cyril Tommasone	France	5.800 14.033 (81)	6.800 13.866 (67)		5.200 14.300 (95)	6.200 14.933 (43)	5.100 11.633 (211)	68.765	
189	Kevin Cerda Gastelum	Mexico	6.200 14.400 (42)	5.300 12.600 (169)	5.700 12.966 (174)	5.200 14.500 (71)		6.300 14.233 (38)	68.699	
190	Paul Ruggeri III	United States	6.700 14.866 (12)	5.000 11.966 (194)		5.800 15.300 (7)	6.300 14.733 (53)	6.100 11.066 (220)	67.931	
191	Levente Vagner	Hungary	5.700 13.866 (94)		5.100 13.833 (103)	4.400 13.566 (179)	5.300 13.866 (125)	5.400 12.600 (172)	67.731	
192	Georgios Christos Chatziefstathiou	Greece	5.100 12.500 (203)	6.100 14.300 (37)	4.900 13.533 (129)	5.200 14.000 (114)	4.800 13.333 (120)		67.666	
193	Anderson Loran	Canada	5.700 13.616 (122)	5.700 13.566 (94)		5.200 14.366 (84)	5.300 12.433 (205)	6.200 13.566 (92)	67.547	
194	Henry Gonzalez Vega	Costa Rica	5.600 12.900 (181)	9.800 (227)	4.600 11.066 (222)	5.200 13.633 (170)	4.800 11.466 (230)	8.666 (234)	67.531	
195	C Meneses Passaro	Uruguay	5.600 10.833 (232)	9.566 (228)	4.000 10.000 (229)	5.200 13.100 (212)	4.600 11.800 (221)	4.100 12.166 (191)	67.465	
196	Sangwook Lee	South Korea	5.500 13.333 (150)	5.300 11.766 (199)	5.300 13.533 (130)		6.300 14.766 (50)	6.300 14.066 (51)	67.464	
197	Jón Gunnarsson	Iceland	4.900 12.166 (215)	9.366 (229)	9.633 (231)	4.400 13.066 (216)	4.100 11.266 (231)	4.200 11.766 (203)	67.263	
198	Rafael Morales Casado	Puerto Rico	5.900 14.000 (86)	5.000 13.300 (114)	5.600 13.300 (153)		5.200 14.133 (125)	5.000 11.700 (225)	66.433	
199	Nomondalai Jamiyankhuu	Mongolia	5.000 10.266 (236)	4.300 10.900 (218)	8.800 (234)	5.200 14.133 (125)	4.600 12.433 (204)	9.533 (232)	66.065	
200	Riveros Vogtschmi.	Bolivia	4.300 11.566 (227)	8.500 (236)	7.166	3.600 12.266 (229)	3.800 11.933 (217)	4.100 10.933 (221)	65.764	
201	Eythor Baldursson	Iceland	?	?	?	?	?	?	65.232	
202	Fabián de Luna	Mexico	?	?	?	?	?	?	64.831	
203	RedByOL Chumacero Cespedes		?	?	?	?	?	?	64.465	
204	Irodotos Georgallas	Cyprus	?	?	?	?	?	?	63.999	
205	Kenzo Shirai	Japan	?	?	?	?	?	?	60.899	
206	Hao You	China	?	?	?	?	?	?	60.1	
207	Alexander Naddour	United States	?	?	?	?	?	?	58.998	
208	Wonchul Yoo	South Korea	?	?	?	?	?	?	58.675	
209	Kristian Thomas	United Kingdom	?	?	?	?	?	?	58.432	
210	Hansol Kim	South Korea	?	?	?	?	?	?	57.798	
211	Ryohei Kato	Japan	?	?	?	?	?	?	57.632	
212	Philipp Herder	Germany	?	?	?	?	?	?	57.565	
213	Sebastian Krimmer	Germany	?	?	?	?	?	?	57.232	
214	Hamilton Sabot	France	?	?	?	?	?	?	56.999	
215	Rayderley Zapata	Spain	?	?	?	?	?	?	56.865	
216	Naoto Hayasaka	Japan	?	?	?	?	?	?	56.499	
217	Nicholas Tai	Jamaica	?	?	?	?	?	?	56.098	
218	Claudio Capelli	Switzerland	?	?	?	?	?	?	55.898	
219	Vlasios Maras	Greece	?	?	?	?	?	?	55.565	
220	Andres Martinez Moreno	Colombia	?	?	?	?	?	?	54.931	
221	Volodymyr Okachev	Ukraine	?	?	?	?	?	?	54.799	
222	Ilya Yakauleu	Belarus	?	?	?	?	?	?	54.715	
223	Marius Daniel Berbecar	Romania	?	?	?	?	?	?	54.499	
224	Aliaksandr Tsarevich	Belarus	?	?	?	?	?	?	52.399	
225	Rachid Moussa	Morocco	?	?	?	?	?	?	49.54	
226	Man Hin Jim	Hong Kong	?	?	?	?	?	?	48.516	
227	Jorge Vega Lopez	Guatemala	?	?	?	?	?	?	44.54	
228	Scott Morgan	Canada	?	?	?	?	?	?	43.999	
229	Arthur Zanetti	Brazil	?	?	?	?	?	?	43.915	
230	Brandon Wynn	United States	?	?	?	?	?	?	43.841	
231	Denis Ablyazin	Russia	?	?	?	?	?	?	43.766	
232	Igor Radivilov	Ukraine	?	?	?	?	?	?	43.699	
233	Pascal Bucher	Switzerland	?	?	?	?	?	?	43.565	
234	Andrea Cingolani	Italy	?	?	?	?	?	?	43.432	
235	Chih-Yu Chen	Chinese Taipei	?	?	?	?	?	?	43.366	
236	Maurcio Gallegos Chacon	Peru	?	?	?	?	?	?	43.299	
237	Siemon Volkaert	Belgium	?	?	?	?	?	?	43.099	
238	Vasili Mikhalitsyn	Belarus	?	?	?	?	?	?	42.966	
239	Yang Liu	China	?	?	?	?	?	?	42.832	
240	Epke Zonderland	Netherlands	?	?	?	?	?	?	42.766	
241	Samir Aït Saïd	France	?	?	?	?	?	?	42.765	
242	Pericles Fouro da Silva	Brazil	?	?	?	?	?	?	42.732	
243	Se Gwang Ri	North Korea	?	?	?	?	?	?	42.649	
244	Ivan Stretovich	Russia	?	?	?	?	?	?	42.532	
245	Eleftherios Petrounias	Greece	?	?	?	?	?	?	42.199	
246	Luis Rivera	Puerto Rico	?	?	?	?	?	?	41.766	
247	Kenneth Ikeda	Canada	?	?	?	?	?	?	41.666	
247	Mattia Tamiazzo	Italy	?	?	?	?	?	?	41.666	
249	Maksym Semiankiv	Ukraine	?	?	?	?	?	?	41.633	
250	K Bohorquez Cantor	Colombia	?	?	?	?	?	?	41.332	
251	Tommy Ramos	Puerto Rico	?	?	?	?	?	?	40.999	
252	Ta Yu Huang	Chinese Taipei	?	?	?	?	?	?	40.132	
253	Jonathan Vrolix	Belgium	?	?	?	?	?	?	39.766	
254	Ivan Vargovsky	Slovakia	?	?	?	?	?	?	39.765	
255	Phay Xing Loo	Malaysia	?	?	?	?	?	?	37.533	
256	Andres Martin Martin	Spain	?	?	?	?	?	?	37.532	
257	Ioan Laurentiu Nistor	Romania	?	?	?	?	?	?	37.499	
258	Andrey Medvedev	Israel	?	?	?	?	?	?	27.899	
259	Louis Smith	United Kingdom	?	?	?	?	?	?	27.433	
260	Reyland Capellan	Philippines	?	?	?	?	?	?	27.033	
261	Javier Cervantes Quezada	Mexico	?	?	?	?	?	?	26.233	
262	L. A. Soto Mendez	Costa Rica	?	?	?	?	?	?	23.166	
263	Davtyan Vahagn	Armenia	?	?	?	?	?	?	15.566	
264	Yuri van Gelder	Netherlands	?	?	?	?	?	?	15.533	
265	Harutyun Merdinyan	Armenia	?	?	?	?	?	?	15.466	
266	Robert Seligman	Croatia	?	?	?	?	?	?	15.4	
267	Krisztián Berki	Hungary	?	?	?	?	?	?	14.966	
268	Timur Kadirov	Uzbekistan	?	?	?	?	?	?	14.766	
269	Sašo Bertoncelj	Slovenia	?	?	?	?	?	?	14.7	
270	Marijo Možnik	Croatia	?	?	?	?	?	?	14.2	
271	Ümit Şamiloğlu	Turkey	?	?	?	?	?	?	14.1	
272	Prashanth Sellathurai	Australia	?	?	?	?	?	?	13.933	
272	Tomi Tuuha	Finland	?	?	?	?	?	?	13.933	
274	Kwang Mo Ri	North Korea	?	?	?	?	?	?	13.166	
275	Rok Klavora	Slovenia	?	?	?	?	?	?	12.566	
276	Xenios Papaevripidou	Cyprus	?	?	?	?	?	?	11.966	

== Floor ==
Rank	Gymnast	Nation	D Score	E Score	Pen.	Total	Qual.
1	Kenzo Shirai	Japan	7.600	8.500		16.100	Q
2	Deng Shudi	China	6.700	8.666		15.366	Q
3	Raydeley Zapata	Spain	6.700	8.566		15.266	Q
4	Kim Hansol	South Korea	6.800	8.466		15.266	Q
5	Tomás González	Chile	6.800	8.400		15.200	Q
5	Max Whitlock	Great Britain	6.800	8.400		15.200	Q
7	Manrique Larduet	Cuba	6.800	8.366		15.166	Q
8	Daniel Purvis	Great Britain	6.500	8.466		14.966	Q
9	Daniel Corral	Mexico	6.400	8.500		14.900	R
10	Arthur Oyakawa Mariano	Brazil	6.400	8.483		14.883	R
11	Fabian Hambüchen	Germany	6.400	8.466		14.866	R

== Pommel horse ==
Rank	Gymnast	Nation	D Score	E Score	Pen.	Total	Qual.
1	Louis Smith	Great Britain	6.900	8.633		15.533	Q
2	Harutyum Merdinyan	Armenia	6.700	8.766		15.466	Q
3	Robert Seligman	Croatia	6.600	8.800		15.400	Q
4	Kazuma Kaya	Japan	6.800	8.500		15.300	Q
5	Alexander Naddour	United States	6.800	8.466		15.266	Q
6	Max Whitlock	Great Britain	7.200	8.066		15.266	Q
7	Vid Hidvégi	Hungary	6.600	8.566		15.166	Q
8	Oleg Verniaiev	Ukraine	7.000	8.166		15.166	Q
9	Kōhei Uchimura	Japan	6.200	8.933		15.133	R
10	Xiao Ruoteng	China	6.900	8.233		15.133	R
11	Krisztián Berki	Hungary	6.300	8.666		14.966	R

== Rings ==
Rank	Gymnast	Nation	D Score	E Score	Pen.	Total	Qual.
1	Eleftherios Petrounias	Greece	6.800	9.100		15.900	Q
2	Liu Yang	China	6.900	8.966		15.866	Q
3	Brandon Wynn	United States	6.800	8.808		15.608	Q
4	Davtyan Vahagn	Armenia	6.600	8.966		15.566	Q
5	Samir Aït Saïd	France	6.800	8.766		15.566	Q
6	Lambertus van Gelder	Netherlands	6.800	8.733		15.533	Q
7	You Hao	China	7.000	8.500		15.500	Q
8	Donnell Whittenburg	United States	6.700	8.766		15.466	Q
9	Arthur Zanetti	Brazil	6.800	8.633		15.433	R
10	Denis Ablyazin	Russia	6.800	8.600		15.400	R
11	Igor Radivilov	Ukraine	6.700	8.633		15.333	R

== Vault ==
Rank	Gymnast	Nation	D Score	E Score	Pen.	Score 1	D Score	E Score	Pen.	Score 2	Total	Qual.
Rank	Gymnast	Nation	Vault 1				Vault 2				Total	Qual.
1	Ri Se-gwang	North Korea	6.400	9.116		15.516	6.400	9.133		15.533	15.524	Q
2	Denis Ablyazin	Russia	6.400	9.133		15.533	6.200	9.233		15.433	15.483	Q
3	Marian Drăgulescu	Romania	6.000	9.400		15.400	6.200	9.233		15.433	15.416	Q
4	Kim Hansol	South Korea	6.000	9.400		15.400	6.000	9.200	-0.1	15.100	15.250	Q
5	Oleg Verniaiev	Ukraine	6.000	9.066		15.066	6.000	9.366		15.366	15.216	Q
6	Kenzo Shirai	Japan	6.000	9.533		15.533	5.600	9.200		14.800	15.166	Q
7	Igor Radivilov	Ukraine	6.000	9.300	-0.1	15.200	6.000	9.233	-0.1	15.133	15.166	Q
8	Donnell Whittenburg	United States	6.000	9.033		15.033	6.400	8.933	-0.1	15.233	15.133	Q
9	Paul Ruggeri	United States	5.800	9.500		15.300	5.600	9.300		14.900	15.100	R
10	Shek Wai Hung	Hong Kong	6.000	9.300		15.300	6.000	8.866		14.866	15.083	R
11	Andrei Muntean	Romania	6.000	9.300		15.300	5.600	9.233		14.833	15.066	R

== Parallel bars ==
Rank	Gymnast	Nation	D Score	E Score	Pen.	Total	Qual.
1	Oleg Verniaiev	Ukraine	7.100	9.033		16.133	Q
2	Yusuke Tanaka	Japan	6.600	9.158		15.758	Q
3	Oleg Stepko	Azerbaijan	7.000	8.700		15.700	Q
4	You Hao	China	7.300	8.400		15.700	Q
5	Manrique Larduet	Cuba	6.700	8.966		15.666	Q
6	Danell Leyva	United States	6.900	8.733		15.633	Q
7	Deng Shudi	China	7.100	8.433		15.533	Q
8	Nile Wilson	Great Britain	6.600	8.900		15.500	Q
9	Axel Augis	France	6.800	8.700		15.500	R
10	Kōhei Uchimura	Japan	6.500	8.966		15.466	R
11	Zhang Chenglong	China	6.500	8.933		15.433	-
12	Lin Chaopan	China	7.000	8.433		15.433	-
13	David Belyavskiy	Russia	6.600	8.800		15.400	R

== Horizontal bar ==
Rank	Gymnast	Nation	D Score	E Score	Pen.	Total	Qual.
1	Danell Leyva	United States	7.300	8.266		15.566	Q
2	Kōhei Uchimura	Japan	7.100	8.266		15.366	Q
3	Arthur Oyakawa Mariano	Brazil	6.500	8.800		15.300	Q
4	Fabian Hambüchen	Germany	6.900	8.300		15.200	Q
5	Andreas Bretschneider	Germany	6.600	8.466		15.066	Q
6	Christopher Brooks	United States	6.800	8.266		15.066	Q
7	Manrique Larduet	Cuba	7.000	8.058		15.058	Q
8	Oliver Hegi	Switzerland	6.500	8.533		15.033	Q
9	Pablo Brägger	Switzerland	7.000	8.033		15.033	R
10	Ryohei Kato	Japan	6.400	8.600		15.000	R
11	Yusuke Tanaka	Japan	6.800	8.200		15.000	-
12	Zhang Chenglong	China	7.400	7.600		15.000	R
