= Philipp Herder =

German artistic gymnast (born 1992)

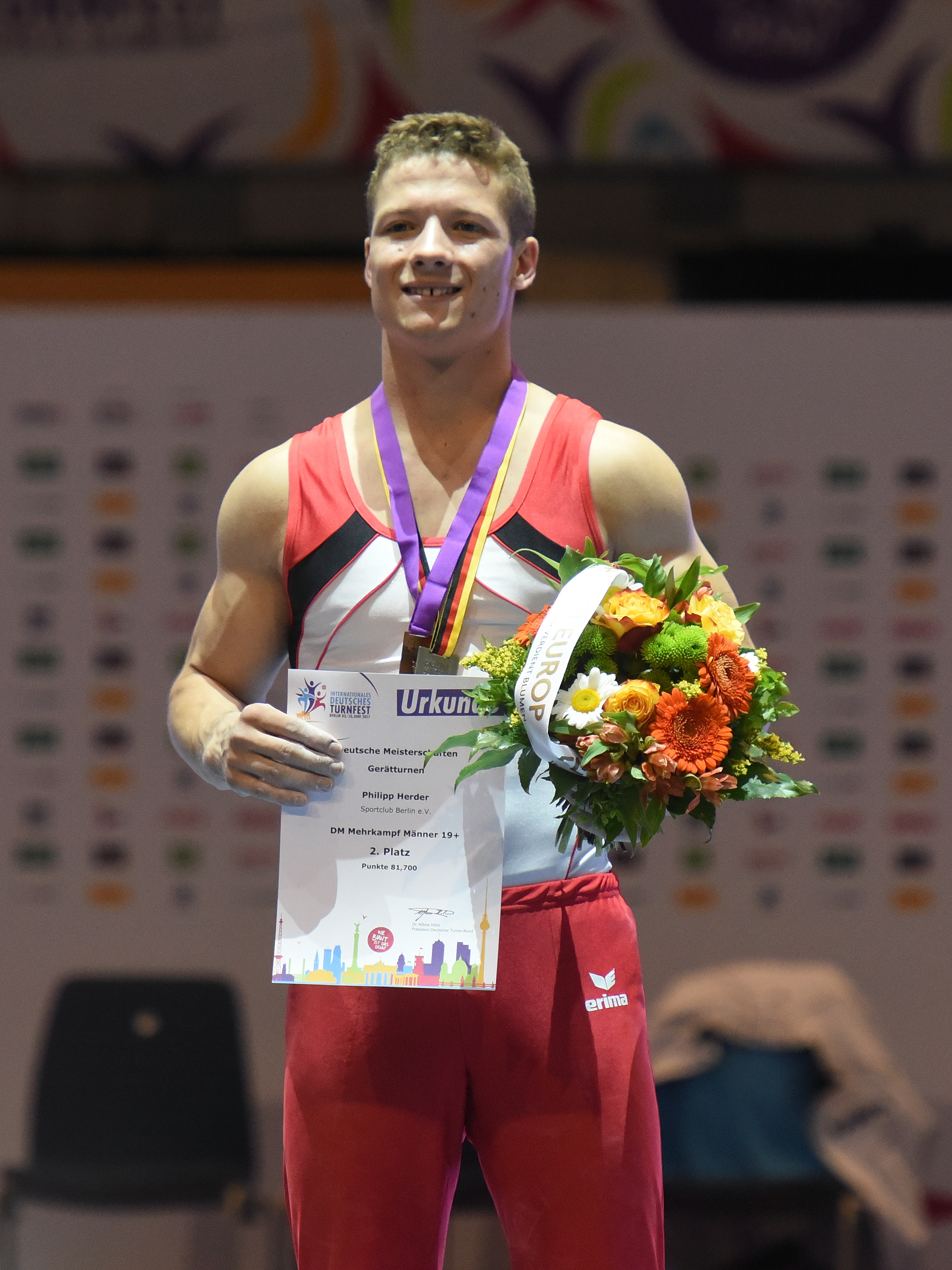
- Herder in 2017

Personal information
- Born: 21 October 1992 (age 34) Berlin, Germany
- Height: 167 cm (5 ft 6 in)

Gymnastics career
- Discipline: Men's artistic gymnastics
- Country represented: Germany; (2014–2021)
- Club: SC Berlin
- Head coach: Andreas Hirsch
- Retired: 24 October 2022

Philipp Herder (born 21 October 1992) is a German former artistic gymnast who represented Germany at the 2020 Summer Olympics.

== Gymnastics career ==
Herder began gymnastics when he was seven years old. In 2011, Herder had a neck injury that required surgery to replace a disk with two fused vertebrae, and he temporarily retired from the sport, but he returned at the 2014 World Championships. There, he helped Germany qualify for the team final in sixth place, but he did not compete in the final. After the World Championships, he competed at the Toyota International and won a bronze medal on the parallel bars. Herder competed at the 2015 World Championships and helped the German team finish ninth in the qualification round.

Herder competed at the 2016 Olympic Test Event and won the gold medal with the German team which allowed Germany to send a full team to the 2016 Olympic Games. He also competed at the 2016 European Championships and helped Germany finish fifth. Herder was selected as an alternate for Germany's 2016 Olympic team.

Herder finished tenth in the all-around final at the 2017 European Championships. That year, he also advanced to the all-around final at the World Championships and finished 18th.

Herder finished fourth in the all-around at the 2018 American Cup. He competed with the German team that finished tenth at the 2018 World Championships, making them the second reserve for the team final. In May 2019, Herder re-injured his neck during training but only had to take a few weeks off. He was still selected for the 2019 World Championships team in Stuttgart. The German team finished 12th in the qualification round and earned a berth for the 2020 Summer Olympics.

Herder was selected to represent Germany at the 2020 Summer Olympics alongside Lukas Dauser, Nils Dunkel, and Andreas Toba. The team qualified for the team final and finished in eighth place. Individually, Herder advanced to the all-around final and finished 23rd.

On 24 October 2022, Herder announced his retirement from international elite gymnastics but said he still planned on competing in the Bundesliga.
