= 2016 Gymnastics Olympic Test Event =

International gymnastics competition

Aquece Rio 2016
- Venue: Arena Olimpica do Rio
- Location: Rio de Janeiro, Brazil
- Dates: April 16–22, 2016
- Competitors: 348 from 60 nations

The 2016 Olympic Gymnastics Test Event, known officially as Aquece Rio 2016, served as the final qualifier to the gymnastics events at the 2016 Summer Olympics, in Rio de Janeiro, Brazil.

== Concerns and criticisms ==
During the test event the FIG (International Gymnastics Federation) raised "serious concerns" regarding the state of preparations for the Summer Olympics. There were power outages while the athletes were performing. Furthermore, the concerns include problems with the timing system and insufficient lighting in competition and training halls.

== Artistic gymnastics ==
=== Competition schedule ===
Date	Time	Round
16 April 2016	10:30-13:00	Men team competition - Subdivision 1
16 April 2016	14:30-17:00	Men team competition - Subdivision 2
16 April 2016	18:30-21:00	Men team competition - Subdivision 3
17 April 2016	09:30-11:30	Women team competition - Subdivision 1
17 April 2016	13:00-15:00	Women team competition - Subdivision 2
17 April 2016	16:30-18:30	Women team competition - Subdivision 3
17 April 2016	20:00-22:00	Women team competition - Subdivision 4
18 April 2016	13:10-14:10	Apparatus final - Floor Exercise (Men)/Vault (Women)
18 April 2016	14:25-15:25	Apparatus final - Pommel horse (Men)/Uneven bars (Women)
18 April 2016	17:10-17:40	Apparatus final - Rings (Men)
18 April 2016	18:00-18:30	Apparatus final - Vault (Men)
18 April 2016	18:40-19:10	Apparatus final - Balance Beam (Women)
18 April 2016	20:30-22:00	Apparatus final - Parallel Bars and Horizontal Bar (Men)/Floor exercise (Women)

=== Medal summary ===
==== Medalists ====
Event	Gold	Silver	Bronze
Men
Team all-around	Germany; Andreas Bretschneider; Lukas Dauser; Philipp Herder; Marcel Nguyen; Ivan Rittchik; Andreas Toba	Ukraine; Vladyslav Hryko; Igor Radivilov; Maksym Semiankiv; Andrii Sienichkin; Oleg Verniaiev; Ilia Yehorov	Netherlands; Michel Bletterman; Bart Deurloo; Frank Rijken; Casimir Schmidt; Jeffrey Wammes; Epke Zonderland
Floor	(Ukraine) Oleg Verniaiev	(Republic of Ireland) Kieran Behan	(Spain) Néstor Abad
Pommel horse	(China) Sun Wei	(United States) John Orozco	(Hungary) Vid Hidvégi
Rings	(Brazil) Arthur Zanetti	(Greece) Eleftherios Petrounias	(France) Samir Aït Saïd
Vault	(Ukraine) Oleg Verniaiev	(United States) Jacob Dalton	(Ukraine) Igor Radivilov
Parallel bars	(Ukraine) Oleg Verniaiev	(Turkey) Ferhat Arican	(Uzbekistan) Anton Fokin
Horizontal bar	(Netherlands) Epke Zonderland	(Germany) Andreas Bretschneider	(United States) John Orozco
Women
Team all-around	Brazil; Rebeca Andrade; Jade Barbosa; Daniele Hypólito; Lorrane Oliveira; Carolyne Pedro; Flávia Saraiva	Germany; Tabea Alt; Leah Griesser; Pauline Schäfer; Sophie Scheder; Elisabeth Seitz; Pauline Tratz	Belgium; Julie Croket; Senna Deriks; Rune Hermans; Axelle Klinckaert; Gaelle Mys; Laura Waem
Vault	(India) Dipa Karmakar	(Uzbekistan) Oksana Chusovitina	(Australia) Emily Little
Uneven bars	(Germany) Elisabeth Seitz	(Germany) Sophie Scheder	(Brazil) Rebeca Andrade
Balance beam	(Netherlands) Sanne Wevers	(Brazil) Flávia Saraiva	(Netherlands) Lieke Wevers
Floor	(Brazil) Flávia Saraiva	(Australia) Larrissa Miller	(Germany) Leah Griesser

==== Medal table ====
Rank	Nation	Gold	Silver	Bronze	Total
1	Brazil (BRA)	3	1	1	5
1	Ukraine (UKR)	3	1	1	5
3	Germany (GER)	2	3	1	6
4	Netherlands (NED)	2	0	2	4
5	China (CHN)	1	0	0	1
5	India (IND)	1	0	0	1
7	United States (USA)	0	2	1	3
8	Australia (AUS)	0	1	1	2
8	Uzbekistan (UZB)	0	1	1	2
10	Greece (GRE)	0	1	0	1
10	Ireland (IRL)	0	1	0	1
10	Turkey (TUR)	0	1	0	1
13	Belgium (BEL)	0	0	1	1
13	France (FRA)	0	0	1	1
13	Hungary (HUN)	0	0	1	1
13	Spain (ESP)	0	0	1	1
Totals (16 entries)		12	12	12	36

=== Results ===
==== Men's results ====
===== Team competition =====
Rank	Team	Floor (gymnastics)	Pommel horse	Rings (gymnastics)	Vault (gymnastics)	Parallel bars	Horizontal bar	Total	Qual.
1st place, gold medalist(s)	Germany	57.965 (5)	57.565 (2)	58.266 (2)	59.132 (3)	60.732 (1)	56.949 (2)	350.609	Q
1st place, gold medalist(s)	Andreas Bretschneider	13.566	13.700	14.600	14.600	15.033	15.183	350.609	Q
1st place, gold medalist(s)	Lukas Dauser	-	13.833	14.033	14.866	15.566	13.400	350.609	Q
1st place, gold medalist(s)	Philipp Herder	14.466	14.033	14.066	14.366	14.233	-	350.609	Q
1st place, gold medalist(s)	Marcel Nguyen	14.533	-	14.800	14.500	15.500	11.900	350.609	Q
1st place, gold medalist(s)	Ivan Rittchik	14.500	14.966	-	-	-	14.066	350.609	Q
1st place, gold medalist(s)	Andreas Toba	14.466	14.733	14.800	15.166	14.633	14.300	350.609	Q
2nd place, silver medalist(s)	Ukraine	58.582 (2)	58.682 (1)	58.099 (4)	58.866 (5)	59.832 (3)	56.099 (4)	350.160	Q
2nd place, silver medalist(s)	Vladyslav Hryko	-	13.833	14.200	14.300	14.100	13.466	350.160	Q
2nd place, silver medalist(s)	Igor Radivilov	14.266	12.000	15.266	15.100	-	13.933	350.160	Q
2nd place, silver medalist(s)	Maksym Semiankiv	14.375	-	13.200	-	14.566	13.900	350.160	Q
2nd place, silver medalist(s)	Andrii Sienichkin	12.766	14.850		14.266	13.033	13.166	350.160	Q
2nd place, silver medalist(s)	Oleg Verniaiev	15.208	15.633	15.000	15.200	16.266	14.800	350.160	Q
2nd place, silver medalist(s)	Ilia Yehorov	14.733	14.366	13.633	14.200	14.900	-	350.160	Q
3rd place, bronze medalist(s)	Netherlands	58.524 (3)	56.733 (4)	56.298 (7)	58.932 (4)	58.333 (5)	58.624 (1)	347.444	Q
3rd place, bronze medalist(s)	Michel Bletterman	14.633	14.100	13.666	14.466	14.800	13.733	347.444	Q
3rd place, bronze medalist(s)	Bart Deurloo	14.625	14.600	14.366	13.633	-	14.925	347.444	Q
3rd place, bronze medalist(s)	Frank Rijken	14.433	14.133	13.833	14.800	13.600	13.800	347.444	Q
3rd place, bronze medalist(s)	Casimir Schmidt	14.833	13.833	14.066	14.866	14.200	-	347.444	Q
3rd place, bronze medalist(s)	Jeffrey Wammes	14.433	-	14.033	14.800	14.333	14.666	347.444	Q
3rd place, bronze medalist(s)	Epke Zonderland	-	13.900	-	-	15.000	15.233	347.444	Q
4	France	57.306 (7)	57.198 (3)	58.633 (1)	58.198 (7)	59.933 (2)	55.315 (6)	346.583	Q
4	Samir Aït Saïd	14.366	-	15.600	14.866	-	-	346.583	Q
4	Kevin Antoniotti	13.266	14.133	13.266	14.366	15.400	14.416	346.583	Q
4	Axel Augis	-	14.733	14.300	13.533	14.533	13.000	346.583	Q
4	Guillaume Augugliaro	13.841	14.266	14.500	14.500	14.333	13.966	346.583	Q
4	Julien Gobaux	14.833	13.966	14.233	14.466	15.100	13.933	346.583	Q
4	Cyril Tommasone	14.266	13.900		-	14.900	-	346.583	Q
5	Romania	58.332 (4)	55.723 (6)	57.699 (5)	59.231 (2)	58.464 (4)	54.699 (7)	344.148	
5	Cristian Ioan Bățagă	14.466	14.166	14.500	14.566	13.433	13.700	344.148	
5	Marius Daniel Berbecar	-	13.491	13.966	-	14.566	13.333	344.148	
5	Vlad Bogdan Cotuna	14.700	12.991	14.500	14.533	14.566	13.733	344.148	
5	Marian Drăgulescu	14.900	13.600	-	15.266	14.166	13.800	344.148	
5	Andrei Vasile Muntean	14.200		14.733	14.866	15.166	13.466	344.148	
5	Andrei Ursache	14.266	14.466	13.700	14.366	-	-	344.148	
6	Spain	59.332 (1)	51.666 (8)	58.232 (3)	59.632 (1)	58.165 (7)	55.698 (5)	342.725	
6	Néstor Abad	15.066	12.500	14.500	15.000	14.866	14.166	342.725	
6	Rubén López	-	13.266	14.533	-	14.333	13.466	342.725	
6	Joel Plata Rodríguez	13.833	11.833	-	14.633	14.533	14.266	342.725	
6	Alberto Tallon Fernández	14.766	13.700	14.666	15.033	14.433	12.133	342.725	
6	Adrià Vera Mora	14.100	12.200	14.033	14.966	-	13.800	342.725	
6	Rayderley Zapata	15.400	-	14.533	13.700	13.633	-	342.725	
7	Belgium	57.832 (6)	56.398 (5)	56.533 (6)	58.440 (6)	57.199 (8)	56.132 (3)	342.534	
7	Maxime Gentges	14.433	14.233	14.000	14.266	14.433	14.133	342.534	
7	Dennis Goossens	-		14.900	-	-	-	342.534	
7	Daan Kenis	14.633	11.700	13.700	15.208	14.633	13.933	342.534	
7	Bram Louwije	14.100	13.966	13.266	14.133	14.233	14.100	342.534	
7	Jimmy Verbaeys	14.133	14.233	13.933	14.466	13.900	13.966	342.534	
7	Siemon Volkaert	14.633	13.966	-	14.500	-	-	342.534	
8	Canada	53.798 (8)	52.865 (7)	55.832 (8)	58.066 (8)	58.266 (6)	51.799 (8)	330.626	
8	René Cournoyer	11.366	13.100	13.800	13.500	14.200	12.433	330.626	
8	Kenneth Ikeda	-	14.533	-	14.400	14.666	13.900	330.626	
8	Scott Morgan	14.766	-	14.633	14.800	-	-	330.626	
8	Jackson Payne	-	12.300	13.566	-	14.700	12.066	330.626	
8	Jay Hugh Smith	14.300	12.666	13.833	14.900	14.033	12.233	330.626	
8	Samuel Zakutney	13.366	12.566	13.333	13.966	14.700	13.233	330.626	

===== Individual all-around =====
Rank	Gymnast	Nation	Floor (gymnastics)	Pommel horse	Rings (gymnastics)	Vault (gymnastics)	Parallel bars	Horizontal bar	Total	Qual.
1	Oleg Verniaiev	Ukraine	15.208	15.633	15.000	15.200	16.266	14.800	92.107	
2	Jossimar Calvo	Colombia	14.733	14.300	14.166	15.033	15.600	14.933	88.765	**
3	John Orozco	United States	14.541	14.833	14.800	13.900	15.466	15.100	88.640	
4	Nile Wilson	United Kingdom	14.366	14.400	15.000	14.700	14.566	15.333	88.365	
5	Andreas Toba	Germany	14.466	14.733	14.800	15.166	14.633	14.300	88.098	
6	Daniel Corral	Mexico	14.366	14.625	14.850	14.300	15.400	13.900	87.441	**
7	Andrey Likhovitskiy	Belarus	14.466	15.241	14.033	13.800	14.933	14.600	87.073	Q
8	Andreas Bretschneider	Germany	13.566	13.700	14.600	14.600	15.033	15.183	86.682	
9	Julien Gobaux	France	14.833	13.966	14.233	14.466	15.100	13.933	86.531	
10	Alexander Shatilov	Israel	14.600	14.100	13.883	14.633	14.433	14.600	86.249	Q
11	Ferhat Arican	Turkey	14.433	13.866	13.833	14.366	15.700	13.933	86.131	Q
12	Néstor Abad	Spain	15.066	12.500	14.500	15.000	14.866	14.166	86.098	*
13	Artur Davtyan	Armenia	13.866	14.066	14.566	15.400	14.466	13.733	86.097	Q
14	Randy Leru	Cuba	14.800	12.233	13.833	14.600	15.366	14.933	85.765	Q
15	Filip Ude	Croatia	14.200	15.200	13.566	14.333	14.200	14.100	85.599	Q
16	Guillaume Augugliaro	France	13.841	14.366	14.500	14.500	14.333	13.966	85.506	
17	Maxime Gentges	Belgium	14.433	14.233	14.000	14.266	14.433	14.133	85.498	*
18	Michel Bletterman	Netherlands	14.633	14.100	13.666	14.466	14.800	13.733	85.398	
19	Chihiro Yoshioka	Japan	14.800	13.133	14.500	14.666	14.666	13.533	85.298	
20	Petro Pakhnyuk	Azerbaijan	14.700	14.100	13.758	14.400	14.533	13.766	85.257	Q
21	Anton Fokin	Uzbekistan	13.066	14.333	13.933	14.366	15.766	13.666	85.130	Q
22	Vlad Bogdan Cotuna	Romania	14.700	12.991	14.500	14.533	14.566	13.733	85.023	*
23	Oskar Kirmes	Finland	14.733	13.866	14.025	14.675	13.900	13.800	84.999	Q
24	Kevin Antoniotti	France	13.266	14.133	13.266	14.366	15.400	14.416	84.847	
25	Cristian Ioan Bățagă	Romania	14.466	14.166	14.500	14.566	13.433	13.700	84.831	*
26	Alberto Tallon Fernández	Spain	14.766	13.700	14.666	15.033	14.433	12.133	84.731	*
27	Ludovico Edalli	Italy	14.300	13.966	13.500	13.816	14.733	14.333	84.648	Q
28	Sérgio Sasaki	Brazil	14.400	14.566	14.300	14.866	13.366	13.133	84.631	
29	Jimmy Verbaeys	Belgium	14.133	14.233	13.933	14.466	13.900	13.966	84.631	*
30	Stian Skjerahaug	Norway	14.400	13.966	13.600	14.733	14.200	13.725	84.624	Q
31	Frank Rijken	Netherlands	14.433	14.133	13.833	14.800	13.600	13.800	84.599	
32	David Jessen	Czech Republic	14.100	13.300	13.733	14.600	14.400	14.400	84.533	Q
33	Robert Tvorogal	Lithuania	14.166	13.708	13.458	14.366	14.333	14.166	84.197	Q
34	Javier Sandoval Afanador	Colombia	13.400	14.066	13.866	14.033	14.800	13.950	84.115	**
35	Phạm Phước Hưng	Vietnam	13.900	13.600	14.433	13.266	15.200	13.633	84.032	Q
36	Kevin Cerda Gastelum	Mexico	14.700	13.200	12.966	14.300	14.133	14.566	83.865	**
37	Daan Kenis	Belgium	14.633	11.700	13.700	15.208	14.633	13.933	83.807	*
38	Marios Georgiou	Cyprus	14.100	14.800	14.000	14.700	14.433	11.766	83.799	Q
39	Bram Louwije	Belgium	14.100	13.966	13.266	14.133	14.233	14.100	83.798	*
40	Kieran Behan	Ireland	14.966	11.600	14.200	14.400	14.433	13.800	83.399	Q
41	Vlasios Maras	Greece	13.825	12.983	13.400	14.633	14.000	14.466	83.307	Q
42	Gustavo Palma Simões	Portugal	14.033	13.633	14.666	14.366	13.600	12.833	83.131	Q
43	Mikhail Koudinov	New Zealand	13.966	13.275	13.300	14.366	14.566	13.566	83.039	Q
44	Ryan Patterson	South Africa	14.533	12.500	13.300	14.533	14.333	13.733	82.932	Q
45	Tomás González	Chile	13.500	13.066	13.900	15.000	14.800	12.533	82.799	Q
46	Botond Kardos	Hungary	14.066	13.200	13.158	14.600	14.066	13.366	82.456	**
47	Lee Chih-kai	Chinese Taipei	13.600	13.466	13.066	15.100	14.433	12.766	82.431	Q
48	Vid Hidvégi	Hungary	13.300	15.100	13.500	13.633	14.100	12.733	82.366	**
49	Jay Hugh Smith	Canada	14.300	12.666	13.833	14.900	14.033	12.233	81.965	*
50	Nicolás Córdoba	Argentina	13.358	12.733	13.300	13.883	14.233	14.266	81.773	
51	Michael Mercieca	Australia	12.900	13.266	13.575	14.233	14.466	12.966	81.406	
52	Luis Rivera	Puerto Rico	14.633	10.866	13.766	14.433	13.833	13.800	81.331	
53	Mohamed Bourguieg	Algeria	14.025	12.391	12.866	14.633	13.733	13.566	81.214	Q
54	Samuel Zakutney	Canada	13.366	12.566	13.333	13.966	14.700	13.233	81.164	*
55	Shek Wai Hung	Hong Kong	14.066	11.683	11.800	15.266	14.366	13.900	81.081	
56	Chen Chih-yu	Chinese Taipei	13.666	11.466	14.933	14.466	13.900	12.600	81.031	
57	Matteo Morandi	Italy	13.633	12.300	15.033	13.500	13.100	13.333	80.899	
58	Tarik Soto	Costa Rica	14.466	12.666	12.666	14.700	13.233	12.533	80.264	
59	Dzmitry Barkalau	Belarus	13.600	12.533	12.366	14.566	13.633	13.066	79.764	
60	Christos Lympanovnos	Greece	12.100	12.533	13.666	14.033	13.133	13.366	78.831	
61	René Cournoyer	Canada	11.366	13.100	13.800	13.500	14.200	12.433	78.399	*
62	Taha Serhani	Switzerland	13.166	12.300	12.700	13.900	13.133	12.666	77.865	
63	Caleb Faulk	Jamaica	12.766	12.066	12.333	13.533	12.666	13.033	76.397	
64	Andrés Pérez Ginés	Puerto Rico	12.966	11.166	11.833	14.241	12.300	11.366	73.872	
	Kevin Rossi	Switzerland	13.566	13.533	13.100	DNS	13.966	13.200	DNF	

Key

Q – Direct qualified for the Olympics
* – NOC may choose between any gymnast for the team who failed to qualify

** – NOC has choice between 2 gymnasts (did not send a team only individual competitors).

===== Apparatus finals qualifiers =====
#	FX	PH	SR	VT	PB	HB
1	(Spain) Rayderley Zapata	(Ukraine) Oleg Verniaiev	(Greece) Eleftherios Petrounias	(Ukraine) Oleg Verniaiev	(Ukraine) Oleg Verniaiev	(United Kingdom) Nile Wilson
2	(Ukraine) Oleg Verniaiev	(China) Sun Wei	(Brazil) Arthur Zanetti	(United States) Jacob Dalton	(Uzbekistan) Anton Fokin	(Netherlands) Epke Zonderland
3	(Spain) Néstor Abad	(Belarus) Andrey Likhovitskiy	(France) Samir Aït Saïd	(South Korea) Kim Han-sol	(Turkey) Ferhat Arican	(Germany) Andreas Bretschneider
4	(Republic of Ireland) Kieran Behan	(Croatia) Filip Ude	(Ukraine) Igor Radivilov	(Canada) Scott Morgan	(Colombia) Jossimar Calvo	(United States) John Orozco
5	(Romania) Marian Drăgulescu	(Hungary) Vid Hidvégi	(China) Liao Junlin	(Ukraine) Igor Radivilov	(Germany) Lukas Dauser	(Cuba) Randy Leru
6	(France) Julien Gobaux	(Germany) Ivan Rittschik	(Italy) Matteo Morandi	(Algeria) Mohamed Bourguieg	(Germany) Marcel Nguyen	(Colombia) Jossimar Calvo
7	(Netherlands) Casimir Schmidt	(Ukraine) Andrii Sienichkin	(United Kingdom) Nile Wilson		(United States) John Orozco	(Netherlands) Bart Deurloo
8	(Japan) Chihiro Yoshioka	(United States) John Orozco	(Ukraine) Oleg Verniaiev		(France) Kevin Antoniotti (Mexico) Daniel Corral	(South Korea) Yoo Won-chul
R1	(Cuba) Randy Leru	(Cyprus) Marios Georgiou	(Chinese Taipei) Chen Chih-yu		(Cuba) Randy Leru	(Ukraine) Oleg Verniaiev
R2	(Canada) Scott Morgan	(France) Axel Augis	(Belgium) Dennis Goossens		(China) Sun Wei	(Israel) Alexander Shatilov
R3	(Finland) Oskar Kirmes	(Germany) Andreas Toba	(Mexico) Daniel Corral		(Vietnam) Phạm Phước Hưng	(Belarus) Andrey Likhovitskiy

===== Floor =====
Rank	Gymnast	Nation	D Score	E Score	Pen.	Total
1st place, gold medalist(s)	Oleg Verniaiev	Ukraine	6.900	8.366		15.266
2nd place, silver medalist(s)	Kieran Behan	Ireland	6.100	8.958		15.058
3rd place, bronze medalist(s)	Néstor Abad	Spain	6.100	8.833	-0.1	14.833
4	Casimir Schmidt	Netherlands	6.400	8.300		14.700
5	Chihiro Yoshioka	Japan	6.600	8.533	-0.6	14.533
6	Julien Gobaux	France	6.200	8.300	-0.1	14.400
7	Rayderley Zapata	Spain	6.600	7.600		14.200
	Randy Leru	Cuba				DNS

===== Pommel horse =====
Rank	Gymnast	Nation	D Score	E Score	Pen.	Total
1st place, gold medalist(s)	Sun Wei	China	6.500	9.066		15.566
2nd place, silver medalist(s)	John Orozco	United States	6.400	8.666		15.066
3rd place, bronze medalist(s)	Vid Hidvégi	Hungary	6.200	8.500		14.700
4	Ivan Rittschik	Germany	6.500	8.133		14.633
5	Andrey Likhovitskiy	Belarus	6.600	7.733		14.333
5	Andrii Sienichkin	Ukraine	6.300	8.033		14.333
7	Oleg Verniaiev	Ukraine	6.800	7.400		14.200
8	Filip Ude	Croatia	6.500	6.633	-0.3	12.833

===== Rings =====
Rank	Gymnast	Nation	D Score	E Score	Pen.	Total
1st place, gold medalist(s)	Arthur Zanetti	Brazil	6.800	9.066		15.866
2nd place, silver medalist(s)	Eleftherios Petrounias	Greece	6.800	9.033		15.833
3rd place, bronze medalist(s)	Samir Aït Saïd	France	6.700	8.800		15.500
4	Igor Radivilov	Ukraine	6.900	8.433		15.333
5	Liao Junlin	China	6.700	8.466		15.166
6	Matteo Morandi	Italy	6.600	8.500		15.100
7	Oleg Verniaiev	Ukraine	6.700	8.283		14.983
8	Nile Wilson	United Kingdom	6.400	8.566		14.966

===== Vault =====
Rank	Gymnast	Nation	D Score	E Score	Pen.	Score 1	D Score	E Score	Pen.	Score 2	Total
Rank	Gymnast	Nation	Vault 1				Vault 2				Total
1st place, gold medalist(s)	Oleg Verniaiev	Ukraine	6.000	9.300		15.300	6.000	9.366		15.366	15.333
2nd place, silver medalist(s)	Jacob Dalton	United States	6.000	9.066		15.066	5.200	9.441		14.641	14.853
3rd place, bronze medalist(s)	Igor Radivilov	Ukraine	6.000	9.466		15.466	6.000	7.933	-0.1	13.833	14.649
4	Scott Morgan	Canada	5.600	9.000		14.600	5.600	8.800	-0.1	14.300	14.450
5	Mohamed Bourguieg	Algeria	5.600	9.000	-0.1	14.500	5.200	9.133		14.333	14.416
6	Kim Han-sol	South Korea	6.000	7.966	-0.1	13.866	5.200	8.900	-0.3	13.800	13.833

===== Parallel bars =====
Rank	Gymnast	Nation	D Score	E Score	Pen.	Total
1st place, gold medalist(s)	Oleg Verniaiev	Ukraine	7.100	9.033		16.133
2nd place, silver medalist(s)	Ferhat Arican	Turkey	6.700	9.033		15.733
3rd place, bronze medalist(s)	Anton Fokin	Uzbekistan	6.600	9.100		15.700
4	Lukas Dauser	Germany	6.700	8.900		15.600
5	John Orozco	United States	6.500	8.933		15.433
6	Marcel Nguyen	Germany	6.600	8.766		15.366
7	Daniel Corral	Mexico	6.700	8.433		15.133
8	Kevin Antoniotti	France	6.000	8.700		14.700
9	Jossimar Calvo	Colombia	6.600	8.000		14.600

===== Horizontal bar =====
Rank	Gymnast	Nation	D Score	E Score	Pen.	Total
1st place, gold medalist(s)	Epke Zonderland	Netherlands	7.100	8.633		15.733
2nd place, silver medalist(s)	Andreas Bretschneider	Germany	7.300	8.300		15.600
3rd place, bronze medalist(s)	John Orozco	United States	6.800	8.566		15.366
4	Bart Deurloo	Netherlands	6.900	8.200		15.100
5	Yoo Won-chul	South Korea	6.400	8.200		14.600
6	Oleg Verniaiev	Ukraine	6.700	7.166		13.866
7	Nile Wilson	United Kingdom	5.500	6.933		12.433
	Jossimar Calvo	Colombia				DNS

==== Men's qualification ====
===== Floor =====
Rank	Gymnast	Nation	D Score	E Score	Pen.	Total	Qual.
1	Rayderley Zapata	Spain	6.700	8.800	-0.1	15.400	Q
2	Oleg Verniaiev	Ukraine	6.900	8.308		15.208	Q
3	Néstor Abad	Spain	6.100	8.966		15.066	Q
4	Kieran Behan	Ireland	6.100	8.866		14.966	Q
5	Marian Drăgulescu	Romania	6.500	8.400		14.900	Q
5	Julien Gobaux	France	6.200	8.633		14.833	Q
7	Casimir Schmidt	Netherlands	6.400	8.433		14.833	Q
8	Chihiro Yoshioka	Japan	6.400	8.500	-0.1	14.800	Q
9	Randy Leru	Cuba	6.400	8.400		14.800	R1
10	Alberto Tallon Fernández	Spain	6.000	8.766		14.766	-
11	Scott Morgan	Canada	6.400	8.366		14.766	R2
12	Oskar Kirmes	Finland	6.000	8.733		14.733	R3

===== Pommel horse =====
Rank	Gymnast	Nation	D Score	E Score	Pen.	Total	Qual.
1	Oleg Verniaiev	Ukraine	7.000	8.633		15.633	Q
2	Sun Wei	China	6.400	9.166		15.566	Q
3	Andrey Likhovitskiy	Belarus	6.500	8.741		15.241	Q
4	Filip Ude	Croatia	6.200	9.000		15.200	Q
5	Vid Hidvégi	Hungary	6.500	8.600		15.100	Q
5	Ivan Rittschik	Germany	6.500	8.466		14.966	Q
7	Andrii Sienichkin	Ukraine	6.300	8.550		14.850	Q
8	John Orozco	United States	6.400	8.433		14.833	Q
9	Marios Georgiou	Cyprus	6.100	8.700		14.800	R1
10	Axel Augis	France	5.900	8.833		14.733	R2
11	Andreas Toba	Germany	6.100	8.633		14.733	R3

===== Rings =====
Rank	Gymnast	Nation	D Score	E Score	Pen.	Total	Qual.
1	Eleftherios Petrounias	Greece	6.800	9.100		15.900	Q
2	Arthur Zanetti	Brazil	6.800	9.000		15.800	Q
3	Samir Aït Saïd	France	6.700	8.900		15.600	Q
4	Igor Radivilov	Ukraine	6.900	8.366		15.266	Q
5	Liao Junlin	China	6.700	8.533		15.233	Q
6	Matteo Morandi	Italy	6.500	8.533		15.033	Q
7	Nile Wilson	United Kingdom	6.400	8.600		15.000	Q
8	Oleg Verniaiev	Ukraine	6.600	8.400		15.000	Q
9	Chen Chih-yu	Chinese Taipei	6.700	8.233		14.933	R1
10	Dennis Goossens	Belgium	6.600	8.300		14.900	R2
11	Daniel Corral	Mexico	6.200	8.650		14.850	R3

===== Vault =====
Rank	Gymnast	Nation	D Score	E Score	Pen.	Score 1	D Score	E Score	Pen.	Score 2	Total	Qual.
Rank	Gymnast	Nation	Vault 1				Vault 2				Total	Qual.
1	Oleg Verniaiev	Ukraine	6.000	9.200		15.200	6.000	9.366	-0.1	15.266	15.233	Q
2	Jacob Dalton	United States	6.000	9.266		15.266	5.200	9.400		14.600	14.933	Q
3	Kim Han-sol	South Korea	6.000	8.966	-0.1	14.866	6.000	9.000		15.000	14.933	Q
4	Scott Morgan	Canada	5.600	9.200		14.800	5.600	9.100		14.700	14.750	Q
5	Igor Radivilov	Ukraine	6.000	9.100		15.100	6.000	8.100		14.100	14.600	Q
6	Mohamed Bourguieg	Algeria	5.600	9.133	-0.1	14.633	5.200	9.233	-0.1	14.333	14.483	Q

===== Parallel bars =====
Rank	Gymnast	Nation	D Score	E Score	Pen.	Total	Qual.
1	Oleg Verniaiev	Ukraine	7.100	9.166		16.266	Q
2	Anton Fokin	Uzbekistan	6.600	9.166		15.766	Q
3	Ferhat Arican	Turkey	6.600	9.100		15.700	Q
4	Jossimar Calvo	Colombia	6.900	8.700		15.600	Q
5	Lukas Dauser	Germany	6.700	8.866		15.566	Q
6	Marcel Nguyen	Germany	6.600	8.900		15.500	Q
7	John Orozco	United States	6.500	8.966		15.466	Q
8	Kevin Antoniotti	France	6.400	9.000		15.400	Q
8	Daniel Corral	Mexico	6.400	9.000		15.400	Q
10	Randy Leru	Cuba	6.600	8.766		15.366	R1
11	Sun Wei	China	6.700	8.600		15.300	R2
12	Phạm Phước Hưng	Vietnam	6.400	8.800		15.200	R3

===== Horizontal bar =====
Rank	Gymnast	Nation	D Score	E Score	Pen.	Total	Qual.
1	Nile Wilson	United Kingdom	6.800	8.533		15.333	Q
2	Epke Zonderland	Netherlands	6.600	8.633		15.233	Q
3	Andreas Bretschneider	Germany	6.600	8.583		15.183	Q
4	John Orozco	United States	6.800	8.300		15.100	Q
5	Randy Leru	Cuba	6.700	8.233		14.933	Q
6	Jossimar Calvo	Colombia	7.000	7.933		14.933	Q
7	Bart Deurloo	Netherlands	6.700	8.225		14.925	Q
8	Yoo Won-chul	South Korea	6.100	8.733		14.833	Q
9	Oleg Verniaiev	Ukraine	6.500	8.300		14.800	R1
10	Jeffrey Wammes	Netherlands	6.400	8.266		14.666	-
11	Alexander Shatilov	Israel	6.100	8.500		14.600	R2
12	Andrey Likhovitskiy	Belarus	6.400	8.200		14.600	R3

==== Women's results ====
===== Team competition =====
Rank	Team	Vault (gymnastics)	Uneven bars	Balance beam	Floor (gymnastics)	Total	Qual.
1st place, gold medalist(s)	Brazil	59.040 (1)	56.041 (4)	56.531 (1)	55.374 (1)	226.986	Q
1st place, gold medalist(s)	Rebeca Andrade	14.933	14.400	-	-	226.986	Q
1st place, gold medalist(s)	Jade Barbosa	14.966	12.733	14.233	13.891	226.986	Q
1st place, gold medalist(s)	Daniele Hypólito	14.333	-	14.166	13.933	226.986	Q
1st place, gold medalist(s)	Lorrane Oliveira	14.608	14.066	13.566	13.400	226.986	Q
1st place, gold medalist(s)	Carolyne Pedro	-	13.433	12.466	12.300	226.986	Q
1st place, gold medalist(s)	Flávia Saraiva	14.533	13.633	14.566	14.150	226.986	Q
2nd place, silver medalist(s)	Germany	56.532 (2)	58.648 (1)	54.366 (5)	54.431 (3)	223.977	Q
2nd place, silver medalist(s)	Tabea Alt	14.100	14.166	14.066	13.666	223.977	Q
2nd place, silver medalist(s)	Leah Griesser	-	14.216	-	13.866	223.977	Q
2nd place, silver medalist(s)	Pauline Schäfer	14.366	-	14.500	13.766	223.977	Q
2nd place, silver medalist(s)	Sophie Scheder	13.966	15.100	12.300	12.966	223.977	Q
2nd place, silver medalist(s)	Elisabeth Seitz	14.000	15.166	13.500	-	223.977	Q
2nd place, silver medalist(s)	Pauline Tratz	14.066	13.300	11.200	13.133	223.977	Q
3rd place, bronze medalist(s)	Belgium	55.700 (6)	55.999 (3)	55.332 (2)	54.407 (4)	221.438	Q
3rd place, bronze medalist(s)	Julie Croket	13.600	13.433	12.833	13.533	221.438	Q
3rd place, bronze medalist(s)	Senna Deriks	-	14.333	-	-	221.438	Q
3rd place, bronze medalist(s)	Rune Hermans	13.800	13.566	13.833	12.900	221.438	Q
3rd place, bronze medalist(s)	Axelle Klinckaert	14.200	13.900	13.966	13.866	221.438	Q
3rd place, bronze medalist(s)	Gaelle Mys	13.900	-	13.833	13.633	221.438	Q
3rd place, bronze medalist(s)	Laura Waem	13.800	14.200	13.700	13.375	221.438	Q
4	France	55.482 (7)	56.640 (2)	54.999 (4)	53.748 (7)	220.869	Q
4	Marine Boyer	13.916	-	14.000	13.166	220.869	Q
4	Marine Brevet	13.900	11.866	14.166	13.483	220.869	Q
4	Loan His	13.866	14.541	13.800	13.466	220.869	Q
4	Anne Kuhm	13.766	13.500	13.033	13.266	220.869	Q
4	Oréane Lechenault	-	14.333	-	13.533	220.869	Q
4	Louise Vanhille	13.800	14.266	12.833	-	220.869	Q
5	Australia	56.532 (2)	54.899 (5)	52.898 (7)	54.099 (5)	218.428	
5	Georgia Rose Brown	13.966	13.666	13.066	13.000	218.428	
5	Emily Little	14.566	-	13.366	13.500	218.428	
5	Larrissa Miller	-	14.200	-	14.100	218.428	
5	Rianna Mizzen	14.100	13.833	12.733	13.133	218.428	
5	Kiara Munteanu	13.733	12.666	11.300	-	218.428	
5	Emma Nedov	13.900	13.200	13.733	13.366	218.428	
6	Switzerland	56.498 (4)	53.532 (6)	54.266 (6)	54.040 (6)	218.336	
6	Caterina Barloggio	-	13.233	12.866	12.966	218.336	
6	Thea Brogli	13.833	12.166	13.000	-	218.336	
6	Ilaria Käslin	13.833	13.433	13.800	13.533	218.336	
6	Laura Schulte	13.766	-	-	12.833	218.336	
6	Stefanie Siegenthaler	-	13.266	13.233	-	218.336	
6	Giulia Steingruber	15.066	13.600	14.233	14.708	218.336	
7	Romania	56.123 (5)	50.599 (8)	55.007 (3)	54.840 (2)	216.569	
7	Diana Bulimar	14.033	11.733	14.141	14.033	216.569	
7	Maria Holbură	-	12.866	13.533	13.541	216.569	
7	Anamaria Ocolișan	14.333	13.200	12.566	-	216.569	
7	Cătălina Ponor	12.333	-	14.600	14.300	216.569	
7	Dora Vulcan	13.766	12.800	12.733	12.966	216.569	
7	Silvia Zarzu	13.991	DNS	-	12.466	216.569	
8	South Korea	54.666 (8)	50.631 (7)	48.965 (8)	49.566 (8)	203.828	
8	Jeong Hee-yeon	13.466	11.800	12.033	12.400	203.828	
8	Kim Chae-yeon	13.600	12.966	10.633	11.533	203.828	
8	Lee Eun-ju	-	13.166	12.466	-	203.828	
8	Lee Go-im	0.000	11.933	11.000	12.100	203.828	
8	Lee Hye-been	13.800	12.566	-	12.666	203.828	
8	Yun Na-rae	13.800	-	13.466	12.400	203.828	

===== Individual all-around =====
Rank	Gymnast	Nation	Vault (gymnastics)	Uneven bars	Balance beam	Floor (gymnastics)	Total	Qual.
1	Giulia Steingruber	Switzerland	15.066	13.600	14.233	14.708	57.607	*
2	Flávia Saraiva	Brazil	14.533	13.633	14.566	14.150	56.882	
3	Tabea Alt	Germany	14.100	14.166	14.066	13.666	55.998	
4	Axelle Klinckaert	Belgium	14.200	13.900	13.966	13.866	55.932	
5	Jade Barbosa	Brazil	14.966	12.733	14.233	13.891	55.823	
6	Loan His	France	13.866	14.541	13.800	13.466	55.673	
7	Lorrane Oliveira	Brazil	14.608	14.066	13.566	13.400	55.640	
8	Ana Sofía Gómez	Guatemala	14.366	13.733	14.233	13.166	55.498	Q
9	Jessica López	Venezuela	14.333	13.633	13.633	13.666	55.265	Q
10	Isabela Onyshko	Canada	13.900	13.266	14.266	13.700	55.132	
11	Laura Waem	Belgium	13.800	14.200	13.700	13.375	55.075	
12	Ilaria Käslin	Switzerland	13.833	13.433	13.800	13.533	54.599	*
13	Vasiliki Millousi	Greece	13.366	13.733	13.966	13.366	54.431	**
14	Zsófia Kovács	Hungary	14.700	13.033	13.300	13.366	54.399	**
15	Lara Mori	Italy	13.700	13.833	13.566	13.300	54.399	
16	Sophie Scheder	Germany	13.966	15.100	12.300	12.966	54.332	
17	Zhang Jin	China	13.700	13.166	13.900	13.550	54.316	
18	Ana Pérez	Spain	13.900	13.900	12.833	13.566	54.199	**
19	Emma Nedov	Australia	13.900	13.200	13.733	13.366	54.199	*
20	Angelina Kysla	Ukraine	13.800	13.433	13.733	13.233	54.199	Q
21	Rune Hermans	Belgium	13.800	13.566	13.833	12.900	54.099	
22	Alexa Moreno	Mexico	14.866	12.200	13.566	13.433	54.065	**
23	Giorgia Campana	Italy	13.600	13.766	13.766	12.833	53.965	
24	Diana Laura Bulimar	Romania	14.033	11.733	14.141	14.033	53.940	*
25	Ana Estefanía Lago	Mexico	14.000	13.766	12.733	13.433	53.932	**
26	Marcia Videaux	Cuba	14.200	12.733	13.233	13.066	53.832	Q
27	Rianna Mizzen	Australia	14.100	13.833	12.733	13.133	53.799	*
28	Claudia Colom	Spain	13.766	13.066	13.725	13.175	53.732	**
29	Georgia Rose Brown	Australia	13.966	13.666	13.066	13.000	53.698	*
30	Ana Filipa Martins	Portugal	13.766	14.133	12.400	13.275	53.574	Q
31	Anne Kuhm	France	13.766	13.500	13.033	13.266	53.565	
32	Katarzyna Jurkowska-Kowalska	Poland	14.166	12.775	13.966	12.533	53.440	**
33	Marine Brevet	France	13.900	11.866	14.166	13.483	53.415	
34	Julie Croket	Belgium	13.600	13.433	12.833	13.533	53.399	
35	Gabriela Janik	Poland	14.100	13.600	12.933	12.700	53.333	**
36	Argyro Afrati	Greece	13.766	13.266	12.800	13.333	53.165	**
37	Lisa Ecker	Austria	13.700	13.100	13.466	12.866	53.132	Q
38	Toni-Ann Williams	Jamaica	14.066	11.833	13.666	13.366	52.931	Q
39	Irina Sazonova	Iceland	13.866	13.533	12.866	12.666	52.931	Q
40	Victoria-Kayen Woo	Canada	13.600	13.966	12.233	13.000	52.799	
41	Phan Thị Hà Thanh	Vietnam	14.300	11.600	13.800	13.000	52.700	Q
42	Dipa Karmakar	India	15.066	11.700	13.366	12.566	52.698	Q
43	Barbora Mokošová	Slovakia	14.066	13.566	12.400	12.500	52.532	Q
44	Courtney McGregor	New Zealand	14.400	12.533	12.400	13.133	52.466	Q
45	Oksana Chusovitina	Uzbekistan	14.833	11.666	13.200	12.766	52.465	Q
46	Houry Gebeshian	Armenia	13.983	13.133	12.733	12.566	52.415	Q
47	Dora Vulcan	Romania	13.766	12.800	12.733	12.966	52.265	*
48	Ariana Orrego	Peru	13.800	13.166	12.666	12.600	52.232	Q
49	Noémi Makra	Hungary	13.500	13.266	13.033	12.133	51.932	**
50	Simona Castro	Chile	13.766	12.600	12.033	13.458	51.857	Q
51	Pauline Tratz	Germany	14.066	13.300	11.200	13.133	51.699	
52	Teja Belak	Slovenia	13.766	13.200	12.266	12.433	51.665	Q
53	Tutya Yılmaz	Turkey	13.733	12.366	12.733	12.800	51.632	Q
54	Emma Larsson	Sweden	13.866	12.000	12.900	12.733	51.499	Q
55	Marisa Dick	Trinidad and Tobago	13.466	12.366	13.200	12.333	51.365	Q
56	Ana Đerek	Croatia	13.933	10.533	12.933	13.575	50.974	Q
57	Catalina Escobar	Colombia	13.966	12.033	12.400	12.500	50.899	Q
58	Kylie Dickson	Belarus	13.658	13.041	12.566	11.533	50.798	Q
59	Ellis O'Reilly	Ireland	13.466	12.333	12.000	12.233	50.032	Q
60	Jeong Hee-yeon	South Korea	13.466	11.800	12.033	12.400	49.699	*
61	Ailen Valente	Argentina	12.933	12.733	11.566	12.366	49.598	Q
62	Marina Nekrasova	Azerbaijan	12.900	12.400	11.733	12.100	49.133	
63	Farah Ann Abdul Hadi	Malaysia	13.600	12.500	10.166	12.866	49.132	
64	Kim Chae-yeon	South Korea	13.600	12.966	10.633	11.533	48.732	*
65	Jasmin Mader	Austria	13.666	9.666	10.966	12.600	46.898	
64	Lee Go-im	South Korea	0.000	11.933	11.000	11.533	35.033	*

Key

Q – Direct qualified for the Olympics
* – NOC may choose between any gymnast for the team who failed to qualify

** – NOC has choice between 2 gymnasts (did not send a team only individual competitors).

===== Apparatus finals qualifiers =====
#	VT	UB	BB	FX
1	(India) Dipa Karmakar	(Germany) Elisabeth Seitz	(Romania) Cătălina Ponor	(Switzerland) Giulia Steingruber
2	(Mexico) Alexa Moreno	(Germany) Sophie Scheder	(Netherlands) Sanne Wevers	(Romania) Cătălina Ponor
3	(Uzbekistan) Oksana Chusovitina	(France) Loan His	(Brazil) Flávia Saraiva	(Brazil) Flávia Saraiva
4	(Brazil) Daniele Hypólito	(United Kingdom) Gabrielle Jupp	(Netherlands) Lieke Wevers	(Australia) Larrissa Miller
5	(New Zealand) Courtney McGregor	(Brazil) Rebeca Andrade	(Germany) Pauline Schäfer	(Romania) Diana Bulimar
6	(Australia) Emily Little	(Belgium) Senna Deriks	(Canada) Isabela Onyshko	(Brazil) Daniele Hypólito
7	(Poland) Gabriela Janik	(France) Oréane Lechenault	(Brazil) Jade Barbosa	(Germany) Leah Griesser
8	(Greece) Argyro Afrati	(Australia) Larrissa Miller (Belgium) Laura Waem	(Switzerland) Giulia Steingruber	(Belgium) Axelle Klinckaert
R1	(Armenia) Houry Gebeshian	(Portugal) Ana Filipa Martins	(Guatemala) Ana Sofía Gómez	(Germany) Pauline Schäfer
R2	(South Korea) Lee Go-im	(Brazil) Lorrane Oliveira	(France) Marine Brevet	(Canada) Isabela Onyshko
R3	N/A	(Netherlands) Sanne Wevers	(Romania) Diana Bulimar	(Venezuela) Jessica López

===== Vault =====
Rank	Gymnast	Nation	D Score	E Score	Pen.	Score 1	D Score	E Score	Pen.	Score 2	Total
Rank	Gymnast	Nation	Vault 1				Vault 2				Total
1st place, gold medalist(s)	Dipa Karmakar	India	7.000	8.100		15.100	6.000	8.566		14.566	14.833
2nd place, silver medalist(s)	Oksana Chusovitina	Uzbekistan	6.200	8.700		14.900	5.500	9.033		14.533	14.716
3rd place, bronze medalist(s)	Emily Little	Australia	5.800	8.833		14.633	5.200	8.933		14.133	14.383
4	Courtney McGregor	New Zealand	5.800	8.666		14.466	5.600	8.533	-0.300	13.833	14.149
5	Daniele Hypólito	Brazil	5.300	9.033		14.333	5.200	8.566		13.766	14.049
6	Gabriela Janik	Poland	5.300	8.833		14.133	4.600	9.100		13.700	13.916
7	Argyro Afrati	Greece	5.000	8.733	-0.300	13.433	4.800	8.658		13.458	13.445
8	Houry Gebeshian	Armenia	5.000	8.816		13.816	4.200	8.666		12.866	13.341

===== Uneven bars =====
Rank	Gymnast	Nation	D Score	E Score	Pen.	Total
1st place, gold medalist(s)	Elisabeth Seitz	Germany	6.600	8.533		15.133
2nd place, silver medalist(s)	Sophie Scheder	Germany	6.400	8.633		15.033
3rd place, bronze medalist(s)	Rebeca Andrade	Brazil	6.000	8.433		14.433
4	Loan His	France	6.100	8.266		14.366
5	Larrissa Miller	Australia	6.100	8.233		14.333
6	Senna Deriks	Belgium	6.100	8.166		14.266
7	Oréane Lechenault	France	6.300	7.700		14.000
8	Laura Waem	Belgium	6.000	7.266		13.266
9	Gabby Jupp	Great Britain	5.800	6.100		11.900

===== Balance beam =====
Rank	Gymnast	Nation	D Score	E Score	Pen.	Total
1st place, gold medalist(s)	Sanne Wevers	Netherlands	6.400	8.400		14.800
2nd place, silver medalist(s)	Flávia Saraiva	Brazil	6.200	8.533		14.733
3rd place, bronze medalist(s)	Lieke Wevers	Netherlands	5.700	8.666		14.366
4	Isabela Onyshko	Canada	6.400	7.666		14.066
5	Ana Sofía Gómez	Guatemala	6.200	7.766		13.966
6	Pauline Schäfer	Germany	5.900	7.900	-0.100	13.700
7	Marine Brevet	France	5.700	7.533		13.233
8	Jade Barbosa	Brazil	5.500	6.566		12.066

===== Floor =====
Rank	Gymnast	Nation	D Score	E Score	Pen.	Total
1st place, gold medalist(s)	Flávia Saraiva	Brazil	5.800	8.600		14.400
2nd place, silver medalist(s)	Larrissa Miller	Australia	5.800	8.200	-0.300	13.700
3rd place, bronze medalist(s)	Leah Griesser	Germany	5.400	8.166		13.566
4	Isabela Onyshko	Canada	5.600	7.800		13.400
5	Pauline Schäfer	Germany	5.500	7.400		12.900
6	Daniele Hypólito	Brazil	5.600	6.966		12.566
7	Ana Pérez	Spain	5.500	6.866	-0.100	12.266

==== Women's qualification ====
===== Vault =====
Rank	Gymnast	Nation	D Score	E Score	Pen.	Score 1	D Score	E Score	Pen.	Score 2	Total	Qual.
Rank	Gymnast	Nation	Vault 1				Vault 2				Total	Qual.
1	Dipa Karmakar	India	7.000	8.066		15.066	6.000	8.533		14.533	14.799	Q
2	Alexa Moreno	Mexico	6.200	8.666		14.866	6.000	8.633	-0.100	14.533	14.699	Q
3	Oksana Chusovitina	Uzbekistan	6.200	8.733	-0.100	14.833	5.500	8.933		14.433	14.633	Q
4	Daniele Hypólito	Brazil	5.300	9.033		14.333	5.700	8.833		14.533	14.433	Q
5	Courtney McGregor	New Zealand	5.800	8.600		14.400	5.600	8.300	-0.100	13.800	14.100	Q
6	Emily Little	Australia	5.800	8.766		14.566	4.600	8.791		13.391	13.978	Q
7	Gabriela Janik	Poland	5.300	8.800		14.100	4.600	8.833		13.433	13.766	Q
8	Argyro Afrati	Greece	5.000	8.766		13.766	4.800	8.700		13.500	13.633	Q
9	Houry Gebeshian	Armenia	5.000	8.983		13.983	5.200	8.633	-2.000	11.833	12.908	R1
10	Lee Go-im	South Korea				0.000	5.000	8.233		13.233	6.616	R2

===== Uneven bars =====
Rank	Gymnast	Nation	D Score	E Score	Pen.	Total	Qual.
1	Elisabeth Seitz	Germany	6.600	8.566		15.166	Q
2	Sophie Scheder	Germany	6.400	8.700		15.100	Q
3	Loan His	France	6.100	8.441		14.541	Q
4	Gabby Jupp	Great Britain	6.100	8.333		14.433	Q
5	Rebeca Andrade	Brazil	6.000	8.400		14.400	Q
6	Senna Deriks	Belgium	6.100	8.233		14.333	Q
7	Oréane Lechenault	France	6.300	8.033		14.333	Q
8	Louise Vanhille	France	6.100	8.166		14.266	–
9	Leah Griesser	Germany	5.800	8.416		14.216	–
10	Larrissa Miller	Australia	6.100	8.100		14.200	Q
10	Laura Waem	Belgium	6.100	8.100		14.200	Q
12	Tabea Alt	Germany	5.700	8.466		14.166	–
13	Ana Filipa Martins	Portugal	5.900	8.233		14.133	R1
14	Lorrane Oliveira	Brazil	5.800	8.266		14.066	R2
15	Sanne Wevers	Netherlands	5.600	8.400		14.000	R3

===== Balance beam =====
Rank	Gymnast	Nation	D Score	E Score	Pen.	Total	Qual.
1	Cătălina Ponor	Romania	5.800	8.800		14.600	Q
2	Sanne Wevers	Netherlands	6.000	8.600		14.600	Q
3	Flávia Saraiva	Brazil	6.200	8.366		14.566	Q
4	Lieke Wevers	Netherlands	5.800	8.708		14.508	Q
5	Pauline Schäfer	Germany	6.000	8.500		14.500	Q
6	Isabela Onyshko	Canada	6.400	7.866		14.266	Q
7	Jade Barbosa	Brazil	5.800	8.433		14.233	Q
8	Giulia Steingruber	Switzerland	5.900	8.333		14.233	Q
9	Ana Sofía Gómez	Guatemala	6.100	8.133		14.233	R1
10	Marine Brevet	France	5.600	8.566		14.166	R2
11	Daniele Hypólito	Brazil	5.800	8.366		14.166	–
12	Diana Bulimar	Romania	5.600	8.541		14.141	R3

===== Floor =====
Rank	Gymnast	Nation	D Score	E Score	Pen.	Total	Qual.
1	Giulia Steingruber	Switzerland	6.100	8.608		14.608	Q
2	Cătălina Ponor	Romania	5.800	8.500		14.300	Q
3	Flávia Saraiva	Brazil	5.600	8.550		14.150	Q
4	Larrissa Miller	Australia	6.000	8.200	-0.100	14.100	Q
5	Diana Bulimar	Romania	5.700	8.333		14.033	Q
6	Daniele Hypólito	Brazil	5.800	8.133		13.933	Q
7	Jade Barbosa	Brazil	5.900	7.991		13.891	–
8	Leah Griesser	Germany	5.500	8.366		13.866	Q
9	Axelle Klinckaert	Belgium	5.600	8.266		13.866	Q
10	Pauline Schäfer	Germany	5.700	8.366	-0.300	13.766	R1
11	Isabela Onyshko	Canada	5.700	8.000		13.700	R2
12	Tabea Alt	Germany	5.400	8.266		13.666	–
13	Jessica López	Venezuela	5.600	8.166	-0.100	13.666	R3

=== Participants ===
==== Men ====
Teams

Teams placed 9–16 at the 2015 World Artistic Gymnastics Championships.

- Belgium
- Canada
- France
- Germany
- Netherlands
- Romania
- Spain
- Ukraine

Individuals

3 gymnasts

- Greece: Christos Lympanovnos, Vlasios Maras, Eleftherios Petrounias

2 gymnasts

- Belarus: Dzmitry Barkalau, Andrey Likhovitskiy
- Brazil: Sérgio Sasaki, Arthur Zanetti
- China: Liao Junlin, Sun Wei
- Colombia: Jossimar Calvo, Javier Sandoval
- Great Britain: Brinn Bevan, Nile Wilson
- Hungary: Vid Hidvégi, Botond Kardos
- Italy: Ludovico Edalli, Matteo Morandi
- South Korea: Kim Han-sol, Yoo Won-chul
- Mexico: Kevin Cerda Gastelum, Daniel Corral
- Puerto Rico: Andrés Pérez Ginés, Luis Rivera
- Switzerland: Kevin Rossi, Taha Serhani
- Chinese Taipei: Chen Chih-yu, Lee Chih-kai
- United States: Jacob Dalton, John Orozco

1 gymnast

- Algeria: Mohamed Bourguieg
- Argentina: Nicolás Córdoba
- Armenia: Artur Davtyan
- Australia: Michael Mercieca
- Azerbaijan: Petro Pakhnyuk
- Chile: Tomás González
- Costa Rica: Tarik Soto
- Croatia: Filip Ude
- Cuba: Randy Leru
- Cyprus: Marios Georgiou
- Czech Republic: David Jessen
- Finland: Oskar Kirmes
- Hong Kong: Shek Wai Hung
- Ireland: Kieran Behan
- Israel: Alexander Shatilov
- Jamaica: Caleb Faulk
- Japan: Chihiro Yoshioka
- Lithuania: Robert Tvorogal
- Norway: Stian Skjerahaug
- New Zealand: Mikhail Koudinov
- Portugal: Gustavo Palma Simões
- South Africa: Ryan Patterson
- Turkey: Ferhat Arican
- Uzbekistan: Anton Fokin
- Vietnam: Phạm Phước Hưng

==== Women ====
Teams

- Australia
- Belgium
- Brazil
- France
- Germany
- Romania
- South Korea
- Switzerland

Individuals

2 gymnasts

- Austria: Elisa Hämmerle, Lisa Ecker
- Canada: Isabela Onyshko, Victoria-Kayen Woo
- China: Zhang Jin, Gong Kangyi
- Spain: Ana Pérez, Claudia Colom
- Great Britain: Gabrielle Jupp, Becky Downie
- Greece: Argyro Afrati, Vasiliki Millousi
- Hungary: Zsófia Kovács, Noémi Makra
- Italy: Lara Mori, Giorgia Campana
- Mexico: Ana Estefanía Lago, Alexa Moreno
- Netherlands: Lieke Wevers, Sanne Wevers
- Poland: Katarzyna Jurkowska-Kowalska, Gabriela Janik
- Sweden: Emma Larsson, Jonna Adlerteg

1 gymnast

- Algeria: Farah Boufadene
- Argentina: Ailen Valente
- Armenia: Houry Gebeshian
- Azerbaijan: Marina Nekrasova
- Belarus: Kylie Dickson
- Chile: Simona Castro
- Colombia: Catalina Escobar
- Croatia: Ana Đerek
- Cuba: Marcia Vidiaux
- Guatemala: Ana Sofía Gómez
- India: Dipa Karmakar
- Ireland: Ellis O'Reilly
- Iceland: Irina Sazonova
- Jamaica: Toni-Ann Williams
- Malaysia: Farah Ann Abdul Hadi
- New Zealand: Courtney McGregor
- Peru: Ariana Orrego
- Portugal: Ana Filipa Martins
- Romania: Cătălina Ponor
- Slovenia: Teja Belak
- Slovakia: Barbora Mokošová
- Trinidad and Tobago: Thema Williams
- Turkey: Tutya Yilmaz
- Ukraine: Angelina Kysla
- Uzbekistan: Oksana Chusovitina
- Venezuela: Jessica López
- Vietnam: Phan Thị Hà Thanh

== Rhythmic gymnastics ==
=== Competition schedule ===
Date	Time	Round
21 April 2016	13:00-19:25	Individual all-around - Qualifications
22 April 2016	11:00-12:30	Group competition
22 April 2016	16:00-18:20	Individual all-around - Final

=== Medal summary ===
==== Medalists ====
Event	Gold	Silver	Bronze
Individual all-around	(Belarus) Melitina Staniouta	(Kazakhstan) Sabina Ashirbayeva	(Austria) Nicol Ruprecht
Group competition	Germany; Anastasija Khmelnytska; Daniela Potapova; Julia Stavickaja; Sina Tkaltschewitsch; Rana Tokmak; Natalie Hermann	Uzbekistan; Samira Amirova; Valeriya Davidova; Luiza Ganieva; Zarina Kurbonova; Marta Rostoburova	Greece; Ioanna Anagnostopoulou; Eleni Doika; Zoi Kontogianni; Michaela Metallidou; Stavroula Samara

==== Medal table ====
Rank	Nation	Gold	Silver	Bronze	Total
1	Belarus (BLR)	1	0	0	1
1	Germany (GER)	1	0	0	1
3	Kazakhstan (KAZ)	0	1	0	1
3	Uzbekistan (UZB)	0	1	0	1
5	Austria (AUT)	0	0	1	1
5	Greece (GRE)	0	0	1	1
Totals (6 entries)		2	2	2	6

=== Results ===
==== Individual all-around ====
===== Qualification =====
Rank	Gymnast	Hoop (rhythmic gymnastics)	Penalty	Ball (rhythmic gymnastics)	Penalty	Clubs (rhythmic gymnastics)	Penalty	Ribbon (rhythmic gymnastics)	Penalty	Total	Notes
1	Melitina Staniouta (BLR)	18.150		18.116		18.066		17.883		72.215	Q
2	Sabina Ashirbayeva (KAZ)	17.250	-0.05	17.450		17.400		17.400		69.500	Q
3	Nicol Ruprecht (AUT)	16.983		16.983		17.100		16.400		67.466	Q
4	Veronica Bertolini (ITA)	17.166		17.133		17.216		15.650		67.165	Q
5	Ekaterina Volkova (FIN)	16.900	-0.05	17.000	-0.05	16.616		16.600	-0.30	67.116	Q
6	Anastasiya Serdyukova (UZB)	16.983	-0.05	16.800		16.316		16.766		66.865	Q
7	Ana Luiza Filiorianu (ROU)	15.950		17.233		16.366	-0.05	17.150		66.699	Q
8	Shang Rong (CHN)	16.566		16.616		16.650		16.666		66.498	Q
9	Jana Berezko-Marggrander (GER)	16.683		16.058	-0.05	16.833	-0.05	16.500		66.074	Q
10	Liu Jiahui (CHN)	16.400		16.583		16.583		16.300		65.866	Q
11	Elizaveta Nazarenkova (UZB)	17.066		14.900		17.050		16.516		65.532	R1
12	Karla Díaz (MEX)	15.850	-0.05	16.766		16.200		16.550	-0.05	65.366	R2
13	Patricia Bezzoubenko (CAN)	16.833		16.666		16.800		14.766		65.065	
14	Laura Jung (GER)	16.350		16.450		16.333		15.600	-0.05	64.733	
15	Jouki Tikkanen (FIN)	16.566		16.275	-0.10	15.750		16.033	-0.05	64.624	
16	Lilit Harutyunyan (ARM)	15.883		15.950		15.850		15.800		63.483	
17	Natália Gaudio (BRA)	14.566	-0.30	15.883		16.350		16.466		63.265	
18	Aliya Assymova (KAZ)	15.141		16.316		15.700		15.716		62.873	
19	Monika Míčková (CZE)	16.233		15.350		15.400		15.700		62.683	
20	Viktoria Bogdanova (EST)	14.933	-0.30	16.433		16.216		14.916		62.498	
21	Alessia Russo (ITA)	14.516	-0.60	16.483		16.366	-0.05	15.016	-0.10	62.381	
22	Dora Vass (HUN)	15.483	-0.30	15.700		15.733		14.958		61.874	
23	Carmel Kallemaa (EST)	15.966		15.766		14.466	-0.30	15.650		61.848	
24	Špela Kratochwill (SLO)	13.100	-0.60	14.266		13.683	-0.05	14.000		55.049	

===== Final =====
Rank	Gymnast	Hoop (rhythmic gymnastics)	Penalty	Ball (rhythmic gymnastics)	Penalty	Clubs (rhythmic gymnastics)	Penalty	Ribbon (rhythmic gymnastics)	Penalty	Total
1st place, gold medalist(s)	Melitina Staniouta (BLR)	17.166	-0.05	18.000		18.033		17.500		70.749
2nd place, silver medalist(s)	Sabina Ashirbayeva (KAZ)	17.400	-0.10	17.500		17.400		16.666		68.966
3rd place, bronze medalist(s)	Nicol Ruprecht (AUT)	17.100		16.950		17.033		16.800		67.883
4	Veronica Bertolini (ITA)	17.200		16.883		17.150		16.450		67.683
5	Ana Luiza Filiorianu (ROU)	17.150		17.200		16.516		16.483		67.349
6	Ekaterina Volkova (FIN)	16.483	-0.10	16.800		16.916		16.883		67.082
7	Anastasiya Serdyukova (UZB)	16.750	-0.05	16.816		16.850		15.916		66.332
8	Jana Berezko-Marggrander (GER)	16.483		16.266		15.866		16.566		65.181
9	Shang Rong (CHN)	16.441	-0.05	16.750		16.550	-0.05	16.300		65.041
10	Liu Jiahui (CHN)	16.050		15.466		16.533		16.466		64.515

==== Group competition ====
Rank	Nation	5	3 + 2	Total
1st place, gold medalist(s)	Germany	16.583 (1)	16.600 (2)	33.183
2nd place, silver medalist(s)	Uzbekistan	16.066 (2)	16.766 (1)	32.832
3rd place, bronze medalist(s)	Greece	15.966 (3)	16.016 (4)	31.982
4	Finland	15.600 (5)	15.800 (5)	31.400
5	Brazil	14.883 (6)	16.183 (3)	31.066
6	Azerbaijan	15.916 (4)	14.333 (6)	30.249
7	South Korea	13.300 (7)	13.400 (7)	26.700

== Trampoline ==
=== Competition schedule ===
Date	Time	Round
19 April 2016	14:00-16:15	Women competition - Qualifications
19 April 2016	14:00-16:15	Women competition - Final
19 April 2016	17:00-19:15	Men competition - Qualifications
19 April 2016	17:00-19:15	Men competition - Final

=== Medal summary ===
==== Medalists ====
Event	Gold	Silver	Bronze
Men	(Belarus) Uladzislau Hancharou	(New Zealand) Dylan Schmidt	(Portugal) Diogo Ganchinho
Women	(China) Liu Lingling	(Russia) Yana Pavlova	(Belarus) Tatsiana Piatrenia

==== Medal table ====
Rank	Nation	Gold	Silver	Bronze	Total
1	Belarus (BLR)	1	0	1	2
2	China (CHN)	1	0	0	1
3	New Zealand (NZL)	0	1	0	1
3	Russia (RUS)	0	1	0	1
5	Portugal (POR)	0	0	1	1
Totals (5 entries)		2	2	2	6

=== Results ===
==== Men's trampoline ====
===== Qualification =====
Rank	Gymnast	Routine 1	Routine 2	Total	Notes
1	Gao Lei (CHN)	50.925	59.735	110.660	Q
2	Uladzislau Hancharou (BLR)	50.515	57.660	108.175	Q
3	Dylan Schmidt (NZL)	48.965	58.745	107.710	Q
4	Diogo Abreu (POR)	49.300	56.480	105.780	Q
5	Diogo Ganchinho (POR)	49.150	56.505	105.655	Q
6	Jeffrey Gluckstein (USA)	47.365	58.100	105.465	Q
7	Logan Dooley (USA)	48.720	56.345	105.065	Q
8	Nathan Bailey (GBR)	48.560	56.135	104.695	Q
9	Blake Gaudry (AUS)	48.630	55.915	104.545	R1
10	Jason Burnett (CAN)	47.545	56.970	104.515	R2
11	Pirmammad Aliyev (KAZ)	47.930	56.445	104.375	
12	Ángel Hernández (COL)	48.080	55.010	103.090	
13	Nicolas Schori (SUI)	47.225	54.960	102.185	
14	Rafael Andrade (BRA)	48.050	53.820	101.870	
15	Andrey Yudin (RUS)	46.720	54.085	100.805	
16	Dmytro Byedyevkin (UKR)	49.040	28.990	78.030	

===== Finals =====
Rank	Gymnast	D Score	E Score	T Score	Pen.	Total
1st place, gold medalist(s)	Uladzislau Hancharou (BLR)	17.300	24.600	17.850		59.750
2nd place, silver medalist(s)	Dylan Schmidt (NZL)	16.200	24.900	17.450		58.550
3rd place, bronze medalist(s)	Diogo Ganchinho (POR)	17.500	23.100	17.485		58.085
4	Nathan Bailey (GBR)	16.200	24.000	17.405		57.605
5	Jeffrey Gluckstein (USA)	16.500	23.700	17.235		57.435
6	Logan Dooley (USA)	16.200	23.100	16.655		55.955
7	Diogo Abreu (POR)	15.300	22.500	17.545		55.345
8	Gao Lei (CHN)	7.400	9.900	7.565		24.865

==== Women's trampoline ====
===== Qualification =====
Rank	Gymnast	Routine 1	Routine 2	Total	Notes
1	Li Dan (CHN)	47.595	54.885	102.480	Q
2	Liu Lingling (CHN)	47.195	54.320	101.515	Q
3	Tatsiana Piatrenia (BLR)	46.350	53.675	100.025	Q
4	Yana Pavlova (RUS)	46.785	52.665	99.450	Q
5	Susana Kochesok (RUS)	46.245	52.590	98.835	Q
6	Nataliia Moskvina (UKR)	46.620	51.600	98.220	Q
7	Rana Nakano (JPN)	45.660	51.525	97.185	Q
8	Ekaterina Khilko (UZB)	46.225	50.430	96.655	Q
9	Leonie Adam (GER)	44.655	51.650	96.305	R1
10	Ana Rente (POR)	44.780	51.150	95.930	R2
11	Charlotte Drury (USA)	43.425	52.490	95.915	
12	Anna Kasparyan (UZB)	45.745	50.085	95.830	
13	Marine Jurbert (FRA)	45.200	49.690	94.890	
14	Maryna Kyiko (UKR)	45.590	49.110	94.700	
15	Ayano Kishi (JPN)	43.480	49.790	93.270	
16	Bo Bet (NED)	44.815	19.320	64.135	

===== Finals =====
Rank	Gymnast	D Score	E Score	T Score	Pen.	Total
1st place, gold medalist(s)	Liu Lingling (CHN)	14.400	24.300	16.785		55.485
2nd place, silver medalist(s)	Yana Pavlova (RUS)	15.000	23.100	16.060		54.160
3rd place, bronze medalist(s)	Tatsiana Piatrenia (BLR)	14.600	22.800	16.140		53.540
4	Nataliia Moskvina (UKR)	14.200	23.100	15.510		52.810
5	Li Dan (CHN)	15.400	21.600	15.745		52.745
6	Rana Nakano (JPN)	14.100	22.500	15.685		52.285
7	Susana Kochesok (RUS)	8.700	25.200	16.360		50.260
8	Ekaterina Khilko (UZB)	13.600	20.700	15.210		49.510
