= Gymnastics at the 2016 Summer Olympics – Men's artistic qualification =

Qualification for men's artistic gymnastic competitions at the 2016 Summer Olympics was held at the HSBC Arena on 6 August 2016. The results of the qualification determined the qualifiers to the finals: 8 teams in the team final, 24 gymnasts in the all-around final, and 8 gymnasts in each of six apparatus finals. The competition was divided to 3 subdivisions.

== Subdivisions ==
Gymnasts from nations taking part in the team all-around event are grouped together while the other gymnasts are grouped into one of six mixed groups. The groups were divided into the three subdivisions after a draw held by the Fédération Internationale de Gymnastique. The groups rotate through each of the four apparatuses together.

=== Subdivision 1 ===
- Brazil
- Japan
- Netherlands
- South Korea
- Mixed Group 3
  - Eleftherios Petrounias (GRE)
  - Vlasios Maras (GRE)
  - Scott Morgan (CAN)
  - Randy Lerú (CUB)
  - Manrique Larduet (CUB)
  - Ryan Patterson (RSA)
  - Kévin Crovetto (MON)
- Mixed Group 6
  - Robert Tvorogal (LTU)
  - Dennis Goossens (BEL)
  - Andrey Likhovitskiy (BLR)
  - Tomás González (CHI)
  - Jossimar Calvo (COL)
  - Ferhat Arıcan (TUR)
  - Alexander Shatilov (ISR)

=== Subdivision 2 ===
- France
- Germany
- Great Britain
- United States
- Mixed Group 4
  - Stian Skjerahaug (NOR)
  - Oleg Stepko (AZE)
  - Petro Pakhnyuk (AZE)
  - Lee Chih-kai (TPE)
  - Harutyun Merdinyan (ARM)
  - Artur Davtyan (ARM)
  - Mikhail Koudinov (NZL)
- Mixed Group 5
  - Vid Hidvégi (HUN)
  - Phạm Phước Hưng (VIE)
  - Ri Se-gwang (PRK)
  - Ludovico Edalli (ITA)

=== Subdivision 3 ===
- China
- Russia
- Switzerland
- Ukraine
- Mixed Group 1
  - Filip Ude (CRO)
  - Daniel Corral (MEX)
  - Anton Fokin (UZB)
  - David Jessen (CZE)
  - Mohamed Bourguieg (ALG)
  - Kieran Behan (IRL)
- Mixed Group 2
  - Marian Drăgulescu (ROU)
  - Andrei Muntean (ROU)
  - Oskar Kirmes (FIN)
  - Rayderley Zapata (ESP)
  - Néstor Abad (ESP)
  - Marios Georgiou (CYP)
  - Nicolás Córdoba (ARG)

== Qualification results ==
Team/Gymnast	Nation	Floor (gymnastics)		Pommel horse		Rings (gymnastics)		Vault (gymnastics)		Parallel bars		Horizontal bar		Total (All-around)	
Team/Gymnast	Nation	Score	Rank	Score	Rank	Score	Rank	Score	Rank	Score	Rank	Score	Rank	Score	Rank
China		43.599	7	44.865	3	46.000	1	45.466	3	47.233	1	43.298	9	270.461	1
Deng Shudi	China	15.033	17	14.866	16	14.300	34	15.300	—	15.800	3	14.366	32	89.665	4
Lin Chaopan	China	13.666	56	15.033	11	14.133	44	15.233	—	15.700	6	14.866	14	88.631	10
Liu Yang	China	12.933	65	—	—	15.900	1	14.683	—	—	—	—	—	43.516	
You Hao	China	—	—	14.966	15	15.800	3	—	—	15.733	5	14.066	41	60.565	
Zhang Chenglong	China	14.900	21	—	—	—	—	14.933	—	15.166	22	13.966	47	58.965	
United States		46.100	1	42.999	8	44.466	4	45.333	4	46.275	3	45.232	1	270.405	2
Chris Brooks	United States	14.533	28	12.766	65	14.566	23	14.400	—	15.300	16	14.766	20	86.331	19
Jacob Dalton	United States	15.600	2	—	—	14.900	15	15.133; 14.633	10	15.166	21	14.333	33	75.132	
Danell Leyva	United States	—	—	14.533	22	—	—	—	—	15.600	7	15.333	4	45.466	
Sam Mikulak	United States	15.800	1	13.100	60	14.533	24	15.100	—	15.375	14	15.133	6	89.041	7
Alexander Naddour	United States	14.700	24	15.366	7	15.000	13	15.100	—	—	—	—	—	60.166	
Russia		43.966	6	45.249	2	45.066	3	45.566	2	46.499	2	43.266	10	269.612	3
Denis Ablyazin	Russia	14.700	25	—	—	15.633	4	15.400; 15.416	2	—	—	—	—	45.733	
David Belyavskiy	Russia	14.600	27	15.300	8	14.533	26	14.900	—	15.933	2	14.533	30	89.799	3
Ivan Stretovich	Russia	—	—	14.566	20	—	—	—	—	15.200	20	14.633	25	44.399	
Nikolai Kuksenkov	Russia	14.666	26	15.383	6	14.433	29	14.900	—	15.366	15	14.100	40	88.848	9
Nikita Nagornyy	Russia	14.066	42	14.541	21	14.900	16	15.266; 15.283	6	13.133	61	12.733	68	84.639	28
Japan		46.099	2	44.299	5	44.133	6	45.932	1	44.832	6	43.999	5	269.294	4
Ryōhei Katō	Japan	15.033	16	14.800	18	13.996	49	14.933	—	15.500	8	15.000	11	89.232	6
Kenzō Shirai	Japan	15.333	6	—	—	—	—	15.466; 15.283	3	—	—	—	—	30.799	
Yūsuke Tanaka	Japan	15.233	8	13.366	57	14.733	17	—	—	13.866	55	14.666	24	71.864	
Koji Yamamuro	Japan	—	—	14.533	24	14.700	21	13.200	—	12.733	66	14.333	33	69.499	
Kōhei Uchimura	Japan	15.533	3	14.966	14	14.700	20	15.533	—	15.466	10	14.300	37	90.498	2
Great Britain		45.799	3	46.223	1	43.874	7	43.066	11	44.932	5	44.766	3	268.670	5
Brinn Bevan	Great Britain	14.233	36	14.733	19	14.333	31	14.133	—	14.966	27	14.366	31	86.764	17
Nile Wilson	Great Britain	15.066	13	14.133	38	14.941	14	14.700	—	14.900	34	15.500	2	89.240	5
Louis Smith	Great Britain	—	—	15.700	2	—	—	—	—	—	—	—	—	15.700	
Kristian Thomas	Great Britain	15.233	7	—	—	14.166	38	14.233	—	—	—	14.900	13	58.532	
Max Whitlock	Great Britain	15.500	4	15.800	1	14.600	22	13.700	—	15.066	23	13.566	58	88.232	12
Brazil		45.600	4	43.799	7	43.866	8	45.182	5	44.766	7	44.865	2	268.078	6
Francisco Barretto Júnior	Brazil	13.433	59	14.533	22	14.200	37	14.200	—	14.900	33	15.266	5	86.532	18
Diego Hypólito	Brazil	15.500	4	—	—	—	—	14.816	—	—	—	—	—	30.316	
Arthur Mariano	Brazil	15.200	9	14.433	27	14.033	46	15.100	—	14.933	29	14.766	20	88.465	11
Sérgio Sasaki	Brazil	14.900	20	14.833	17	14.133	43	15.266; 15.016	9	14.933	31	14.833	16	88.898	8
Arthur Zanetti	Brazil	—	—	—	—	15.533	5	—	—	—	—	—	—	15.533	
Ukraine		42.699	9	43.865	6	44.208	5	44.889	6	43.966	11	43.365	8	263.002	7
Vladyslav Hryko	Ukraine	13.666	54	13.766	49	13.700	56	—	—	14.500	43	13.666	53	69.298	
Ihor Radivilov	Ukraine	13.666	55	—	—	15.308	9	15.433; 15.283	4	—	—	13.500	59	57.907	
Maksym Semiankiv	Ukraine	14.200	38	13.700	51	13.666	58	13.633	—	13.300	59	14.566	29	83.065	39
Andriy Sienichkin	Ukraine	—	—	14.533	25	—	—	14.400	—	12.766	65	—	—	41.699	
Oleg Verniaiev	Ukraine	14.833	22	15.566	5	15.200	11	15.066; 15.183	7	16.166	1	15.133	7	91.964	1
Germany		43.341	8	41.607	10	42.807	11	44.399	7	45.565	4	43.799	6	261.518	8
Andreas Bretschneider	Germany	14.800	23	13.641	52	14.158	40	14.633	—	14.833	36	13.633	55	85.698	24
Lukas Dauser	Germany	—	—	13.733	50	13.916	50	13.833	—	15.266	19	—	—	56.748	
Fabian Hambüchen	Germany	14.041	43	—	—	—	—	15.166	—	—	—	15.533	1	44.740	
Marcel Nguyen	Germany	14.500	30	13.433	54	14.733	18	14.600	—	15.466	11	13.366	62	86.098	22
Andreas Toba	Germany	1.633	72	14.233	32	—	—	—	—	—	—	14.633	26	30.499	
Switzerland		44.599	5	42.532	9	42.866	10	44.000	8	44.099	10	42.166	12	260.262	9
Christian Baumann	Switzerland	—	—	14.333	29	14.133	41	—	—	14.933	30	13.700	52	57.099	
Pablo Brägger	Switzerland	14.500	31	13.933	44	14.033	45	13.800	—	14.833	37	15.100	9	86.199	21
Benjamin Gischard	Switzerland	15.066	12	—	—	—	—	14.300; 14.516	12	—	—	—	—	29.366	
Oliver Hegi	Switzerland	13.966	49	14.066	39	14.200	36	14.500	—	14.333	48	13.366	61	84.431	30
Eddy Yusof	Switzerland	15.033	15	14.133	37	14.533	24	15.200	—	13.300	60	13.166	65	85.365	25
Netherlands		42.399	11	40.099	12	43.299	9	43.958	9	43.399	12	44.532	4	257.686	10
Bart Deurloo	Netherlands	14.000	46	14.200	36	14.266	35	14.858	—	14.566	42	15.100	10	86.990	14
Frank Rijken	Netherlands	13.866	52	13.966	43	13.700	54	14.200	—	14.500	44	14.033	45	84.265	33
Yuri van Gelder	Netherlands	—	—	—	—	15.333	8	—	—	—	—	—	—	—	—
Jeffrey Wammes	Netherlands	14.533	29	11.933	70	12.941	69	14.900	—	14.333	47	14.066	41	82.706	40
Epke Zonderland	Netherlands	—	—	—	—	—	—	—	—	—	—	15.366	3	15.366	
South Korea		42.565	10	41.408	11	42.633	12	43.466	10	44.107	9	43.466	7	257.645	11
Kim Han-sol	South Korea	14.266	35	12.900	63	—	—	12.633; 13.749	17	—	—	11.666	71	51.465	
Lee Sang-wook	South Korea	14.333	32	14.033	41	13.500	60	—	—	14.633	41	14.066	43	70.565	
Park Min-soo	South Korea	13.400	60	13.600	53	14.400	30	14.033	—	15.033	24	14.800	17	85.266	27
Shin Dong-hyen	South Korea	13.966	48	13.775	48	—	—	15.100	—	13.800	56	—	—	56.641	
Yoo Won-chul	South Korea	—	—	—	—	14.733	19	14.333	—	14.441	45	14.600	27	58.107	
France		41.065	12	44.383	4	45.299	2	39.732	12	44.299	8	42.433	11	257.211	12
Samir Aït Saïd	France	—	—	—	—	15.533	6	12.866	—	—	—	—	—	28.399	
Axel Augis	France	14.033	44	14.500	26	14.333	31	13.166	—	15.300	17	14.700	23	86.032	23
Julien Gobaux	France	13.066	63	14.233	33	14.500	28	13.700	—	14.766	38	14.300	36	84.565	29
Danny Pinheiro Rodrigues	France	—	—	13.133	59	15.266	10	—	—	14.233	50	13.433	60	56.065	
Cyril Tommasone	France	13.966	47	15.650	3	—	—	—	—	14.100	52	—	—	43.716	
Jossimar Calvo	Colombia	14.175	39	15.033	12	14.166	39	13.766	—	15.400	13	14.966	12	87.506	13
Manrique Larduet	Cuba	15.200	10	13.866	45	15.100	12	11.766	—	15.766	4	15.116	8	86.814	15
Andrey Likhovitskiy	Belarus	14.200	37	15.233	10	13.866	51	13.966	—	14.900	32	14.600	27	86.765	16
Oleg Stepko	Azerbaijan	13.900	50	14.975	13	14.033	47	14.400	—	15.300	18	13.600	57	86.208	20
Marios Georgiou	Cyprus	13.566	57	14.066	40	13.366	65	14.733	—	14.858	35	14.700	22	85.289	26
Néstor Abad	Spain	14.033	45	13.400	55	14.333	33	14.900	—	12.966	64	14.766	19	84.398	31
Stian Skjerahaug	Norway	14.166	40	14.233	34	13.266	67	14.700	—	14.266	49	13.700	51	84.331	32
Petro Pakhnyuk	Azerbaijan	14.133	41	14.233	35	13.600	59	14.300	—	14.166	51	13.783	50	84.215	34
Oskar Kirmes	Finland	14.933	19	14.000	42	13.833	52	14.200	—	13.891	54	13.266	64	84.123	35
Andrei Muntean	Romania	13.733	53	12.500	67	13.700	55	14.633; 14.483	13	15.466	9	13.833	49	83.865	36
Anton Fokin	Uzbekistan	11.800	71	14.333	28	13.966	48	14.400	—	15.466	12	13.866	48	83.831	37
Kieran Behan	Ireland	14.333	33	12.866	64	14.133	42	14.300	—	14.000	53	13.600	56	83.232	38
Ferhat Arıcan	Turkey	13.133	62	13.866	46	13.733	53	13.533	—	14.733	39	13.633	54	82.631	41
Robert Tvorogal	Lithuania	13.866	51	13.366	56	13.466	61	14.133; 13.849	15	13.500	57	14.166	39	82.497	42
Randy Lerú	Cuba	13.000	64	11.966	69	13.400	63	14.166	—	15.000	26	14.866	14	82.398	43
Ludovico Edalli	Italy	12.433	69	13.333	58	13.666	57	13.933	—	14.400	46	14.033	46	81.798	44
Mikhail Koudinov	New Zealand	13.200	61	12.600	66	13.433	62	14.133; 13.849	16	14.700	40	12.833	67	80.899	45
Ryan Patterson	South Africa	14.300	34	13.033	61	13.333	66	13.733	—	13.000	63	13.291	63	80.690	46
David Jessen	Czech Republic	12.233	70	12.166	68	13.366	64	14.500	—	13.100	62	14.316	35	79.681	47
Mohamed Bourguieg	Algeria	12.533	68	12.900	62	13.033	68	13.700	—	13.500	57	12.833	66	78.499	48
Kévin Crovetto	Monaco	12.858	66	11.800	71	12.866	70	13.166	—	12.700	67	12.666	69	76.056	49
Scott Morgan	Canada	14.966	18	—	—	14.533	27	14.600; 14.470	14	—	—	—	—	44.099	
Marian Drăgulescu	Romania	12.800	67	—	—	—	—	15.133; 15.283	5	—	—	12.166	70	40.099	
Tomás González	Chile	15.066	14	—	—	—	—	15.233; 15.149	8	—	—	—	—	30.199	
Daniel Corral	Mexico	—	—	13.833	47	—	—	—	—	15.000	25	—	—	28.833	
Alexander Shatilov	Israel	13.500	58	—	—	—	—	—	—	—	—	14.066	44	27.566	
Eleftherios Petrounias	Greece	—	—	—	—	15.833	2	—	—	—	—	—	—	15.833	
Harutyun Merdinyan	Armenia	—	—	15.583	4	—	—	—	—	—	—	—	—	15.583	
Dennis Goossens	Belgium	—	—	—	—	15.366	7	—	—	—	—	—	—	15.366	
Ri Se-gwang	North Korea	—	—	—	—	—	—	15.300; 15.433	1	—	—	—	—	15.300	
Artur Davtyan	Armenia	—	—	—	—	—	—	15.300; 14.566	11	—	—	—	—	15.300	
Vid Hidvégi	Hungary	—	—	15.233	9	—	—	—	—	—	—	—	—	15.233	
Rayderley Zapata	Spain	15.083	11	—	—	—	—	—	—	—	—	—	—	15.083	
Phạm Phước Hưng	Vietnam	—	—	—	—	—	—	—	—	14.966	28	—	—	14.966	
Nicolás Córdoba	Argentina	—	—	—	—	—	—	—	—	—	—	14.800	18	14.800	
Filip Ude	Croatia	—	—	14.333	30	—	—	—	—	—	—	—	—	14.333	
Lee Chih-kai	Chinese Taipei	—	—	14.266	31	—	—	—	—	—	—	—	—	14.266	
Vlasios Maras	Greece	—	—	—	—	—	—	—	—	—	—	14.200	38	14.200	

=== Individual all-around ===
The top twenty-four gymnasts qualified for the final round, with the caveat that only two gymnasts from each NOC were permitted to qualify. In any cases where more than two gymnasts from the same NOC would have qualified, only the top two from that NOC qualified, with the next-best ranked gymnast from another NOC qualifying instead.

Rank	Gymnast	Nation	Floor (gymnastics)	Pommel horse	Rings (gymnastics)	Vault (gymnastics)	Parallel bars	Horizontal bar	Total	Notes
1	Oleg Verniaiev	Ukraine	14.833	15.566	15.200	15.066	16.166	15.133	91.964	Q
2	Kōhei Uchimura	Japan	15.533	14.966	14.700	15.533	15.466	14.300	90.498	Q
3	David Belyavskiy	Russia	14.600	15.300	14.533	14.900	15.933	14.533	89.799	Q
4	Deng Shudi	China	15.033	14.866	14.300	15.300	15.800	14.366	89.665	Q
5	Nile Wilson	Great Britain	15.066	14.133	14.941	14.700	14.900	15.500	89.240	Q
6	Ryōhei Katō	Japan	15.033	14.800	13.966	14.933	15.500	15.000	89.232	Q
7	Sam Mikulak	United States	15.800	13.100	14.533	15.100	15.375	15.133	89.041	Q
8	Sérgio Sasaki	Brazil	14.900	14.833	14.133	15.266	14.933	14.833	88.898	Q
9	Nikolai Kuksenkov	Russia	14.666	15.383	14.433	14.900	15.366	14.100	88.848	Q
10	Lin Chaopan	China	13.666	15.033	14.133	15.233	15.700	14.866	88.631	Q
11	Arthur Mariano	Brazil	15.200	14.433	14.033	15.100	14.933	14.766	88.465	Q
12	Max Whitlock	Great Britain	15.500	15.800	14.600	13.700	15.066	13.566	88.232	Q
13	Jossimar Calvo	Colombia	14.175	15.033	14.166	13.766	15.400	14.966	87.506	Q
14	Bart Deurloo	Netherlands	14.000	14.200	14.266	14.858	14.566	15.100	86.990	Q
15	Manrique Larduet	Cuba	15.200	13.866	15.100	11.766	15.766	15.116	86.814	Q
16	Andrey Likhovitskiy	Belarus	14.200	15.233	13.866	13.966	14.900	14.600	86.765	Q
17	Brinn Bevan	Great Britain	14.233	14.733	14.333	14.133	14.966	14.366	86.764	–
18	Francisco Barretto Júnior	Brazil	13.433	14.533	14.200	14.200	14.900	15.266	86.532	–
19	Chris Brooks	United States	14.533	12.766	14.566	14.400	15.300	14.766	86.331	Q
20	Oleg Stepko	Azerbaijan	13.900	14.975	14.033	14.400	15.300	13.600	86.208	Q
21	Pablo Brägger	Switzerland	14.500	13.933	14.033	13.800	14.833	15.100	86.199	Q
22	Marcel Nguyen	Germany	14.500	13.433	14.733	14.600	15.466	13.366	86.098	Q
23	Axel Augis	France	14.033	14.500	14.333	13.166	15.300	14.700	86.032	Q
24	Andreas Bretschneider	Germany	14.800	13.641	14.158	14.633	14.833	13.633	85.698	Q
25	Eddy Yusof	Switzerland	15.033	14.133	14.533	15.200	13.300	13.166	85.365	Q
26	Marios Georgiou	Cyprus	13.566	14.066	13.366	14.733	14.858	14.700	85.289	Q
27	Park Min-soo	South Korea	13.400	13.600	14.400	14.033	15.033	14.800	85.266	R1
28	Nikita Nagornyy	Russia	14.066	14.541	14.900	15.266	13.133	12.733	84.639	–
29	Julien Gobaux	France	13.066	14.233	14.500	13.700	14.766	14.300	84.565	R2

=== Floor ===
The top eight gymnasts qualified for the final round, with the caveat that only two gymnasts from each NOC were permitted to qualify. In any cases where more than two gymnasts from the same NOC would have qualified, only the top two from that NOC qualified, with the next-best ranked gymnast from another NOC qualifying instead.

Rank	Gymnast	Nation	Total	Notes
1	Sam Mikulak	United States	15.800	Q
2	Jacob Dalton	United States	15.600	Q
3	Kōhei Uchimura	Japan	15.533	Q
4	Diego Hypólito	Brazil	15.500	Q
4	Max Whitlock	Great Britain	15.500	Q
6	Kenzō Shirai	Japan	15.333	Q
7	Kristian Thomas	Great Britain	15.233	Q
8	Yūsuke Tanaka	Japan	15.233	–
9	Arthur Mariano	Brazil	15.200	Q
10	Manrique Larduet	Cuba	15.200	R1
11	Rayderley Zapata	Spain	15.083	R2

=== Pommel horse ===
The top eight gymnasts qualified for the final round, with the caveat that only two gymnasts from each NOC were permitted to qualify. In any cases where more than two gymnasts from the same NOC would have qualified, only the top two from that NOC qualified, with the next-best ranked gymnast from another NOC qualifying instead.

Rank	Gymnast	Nation	Total	Notes
1	Max Whitlock	Great Britain	15.800	Q
2	Louis Smith	Great Britain	15.700	Q
3	Cyril Tommasone	France	15.650	Q
4	Harutyun Merdinyan	Armenia	15.583	Q
5	Oleg Verniaiev	Ukraine	15.566	Q
6	Nikolai Kuksenkov	Russia	15.383	Q
7	Alexander Naddour	United States	15.366	Q
8	David Belyavskiy	Russia	15.300	Q
9	Vid Hidvegi	Hungary	15.233	R1
10	Andrey Likhovitskiy	Belarus	15.233	R2

=== Rings ===
The top eight gymnasts qualified for the final round, with the caveat that only two gymnasts from each NOC were permitted to qualify. In any cases where more than two gymnasts from the same NOC would have qualified, only the top two from that NOC qualified, with the next-best ranked gymnast from another NOC qualifying instead.

Rank	Gymnast	Nation	Total	Notes
1	Liu Yang	China	15.900	Q
2	Eleftherios Petrounias	Greece	15.833	Q
3	You Hao	China	15.800	Q
4	Denis Ablyazin	Russia	15.633	Q
5	Arthur Zanetti	Brazil	15.533	Q
6	Samir Aït Saïd	France	15.533	~~Q~~ Injured
7	Dennis Goossens	Belgium	15.366	Q
8	Yuri van Gelder	Netherlands	15.333	~~Q~~ Removed by NOC
9	Ihor Radivilov	Ukraine	15.308	~~R1~~ Q
10	Danny Pinheiro Rodrigues	France	15.266	~~R2~~ Q
11	Oleg Verniaiev	Ukraine	15.200	~~R3~~ R1
12	Manrique Larduet	Cuba	15.100	R2
13	Alexander Naddour	United States	15.000	R3

=== Vault ===
The top eight gymnasts qualified for the final round, with the caveat that only two gymnasts from each NOC were permitted to qualify. In any cases where more than two gymnasts from the same NOC would have qualified, only the top two from that NOC qualified, with the next-best ranked gymnast from another NOC qualifying instead.

Rank	Gymnast	Nation	Total	Notes
1	Ri Se-gwang	North Korea	15.433	Q
2	Denis Ablyazin	Russia	15.416	Q
3	Kenzō Shirai	Japan	15.283	Q
4	Ihor Radivilov	Ukraine	15.283	Q
5	Marian Drăgulescu	Romania	15.283	Q
6	Nikita Nagornyy	Russia	15.283	Q
7	Oleg Verniaiev	Ukraine	15.183	Q
8	Tomás González	Chile	15.149	Q
9	Sérgio Sasaki	Brazil	15.016	R1
10	Jacob Dalton	United States	14.633	R2

=== Parallel bars ===
The top eight gymnasts qualified for the final round, with the caveat that only two gymnasts from each NOC were permitted to qualify. In any cases where more than two gymnasts from the same NOC would have qualified, only the top two from that NOC qualified, with the next-best ranked gymnast from another NOC qualifying instead.

Rank	Gymnast	Nation	Total	Notes
1	Oleg Verniaiev	Ukraine	16.166	Q
2	David Belyavskiy	Russia	15.933	Q
3	Deng Shudi	China	15.800	Q
4	Manrique Larduet	Cuba	15.766	Q
5	You Hao	China	15.733	Q
6	Lin Chaopan	China	15.700	–
7	Danell Leyva	United States	15.600	Q
8	Ryōhei Katō	Japan	15.500	Q
9	Andrei Muntean	Romania	15.466	Q
10	Kōhei Uchimura	Japan	15.466	R1
11	Marcel Nguyen	Germany	15.466	R2

=== Horizontal bar ===
The top eight gymnasts qualified for the final round, with the caveat that only two gymnasts from each NOC were permitted to qualify. In any cases where more than two gymnasts from the same NOC would have qualified, only the top two from that NOC qualified, with the next-best ranked gymnast from another NOC qualifying instead.

Rank	Gymnast	Nation	Total	Notes
1	Fabian Hambüchen	Germany	15.533	Q
2	Nile Wilson	Great Britain	15.500	Q
3	Epke Zonderland	Netherlands	15.366	Q
4	Danell Leyva	United States	15.333	Q
5	Francisco Barretto Júnior	Brazil	15.266	Q
6	Sam Mikulak	United States	15.133	Q
7	Oleg Verniaiev	Ukraine	15.133	Q
8	Manrique Larduet	Cuba	15.116	Q
9	Pablo Brägger	Switzerland	15.100	R1
10	Bart Deurloo	Netherlands	15.100	R2
