= Leah Grießer =

German artistic gymnast

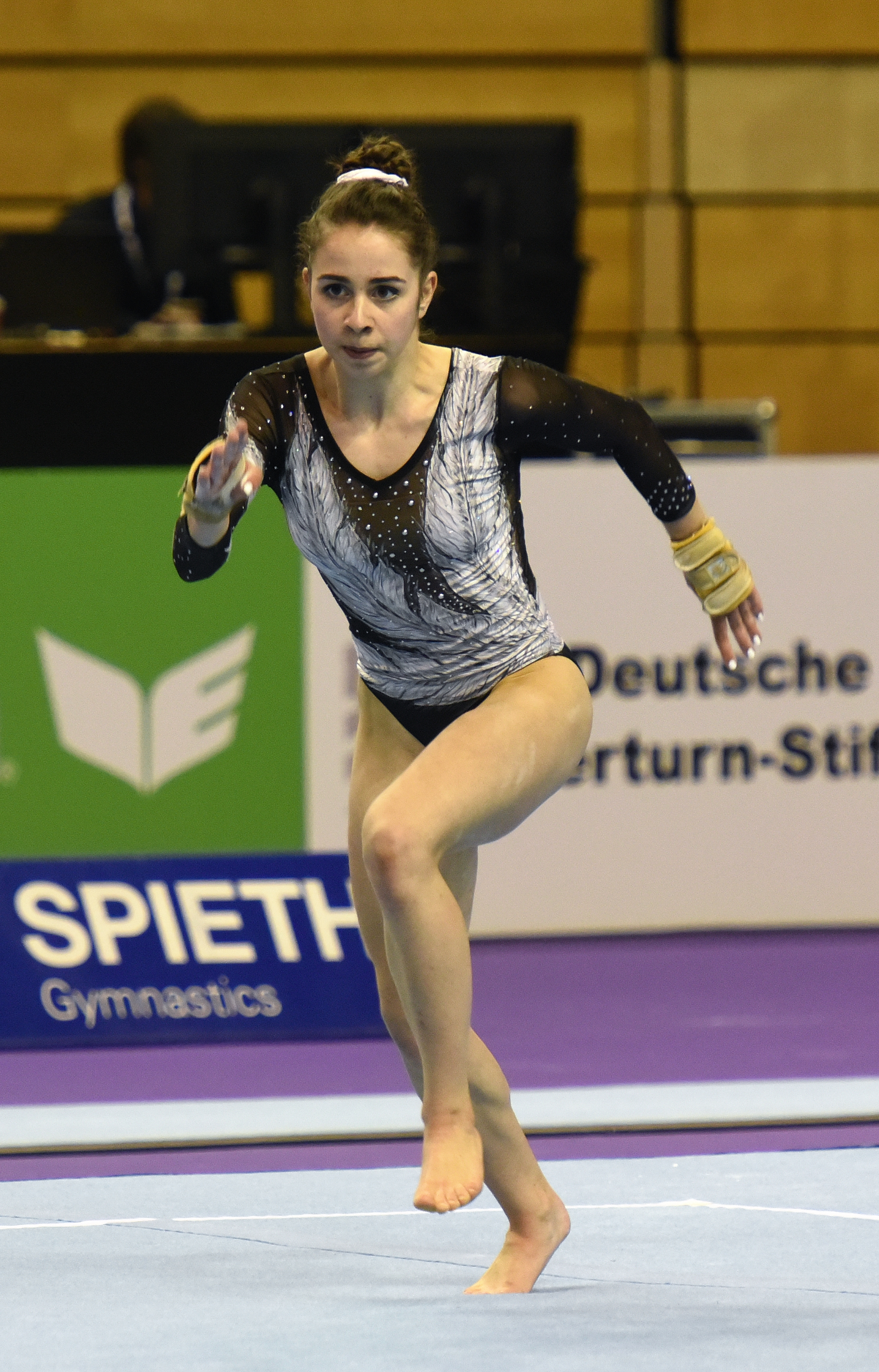
- Grießer in 2017

Personal information
- Full name: Leah Grießer
- Born: 11 September 1998 (age 27) Gengenbach, Germany

Gymnastics career
- Discipline: Women's artistic gymnastics
- Country represented: Germany (2012–2021)
- Club: TG Neureut
- Head coach: Tatjana Bachmayer
- Assistant coach: Chris Lakeman
- Retired: 2021
Medal record
Representing Germany
European Games
| Silver medal – second place | 2015 Baku | Team |
FIG World Cup
| Event | 1st | 2nd | 3rd |
|---|---|---|---|
| Apparatus World Cup | 0 | 1 | 0 |
| World Challenge Cup | 0 | 0 | 1 |
| Total | 0 | 1 | 1 |
- Education: University of Mannheim

Leah Grießer (born 11 September 1998) is a retired German artistic gymnast. She was a member of the team who won silver at the 2015 European Games and competed for Germany at the 2015 and 2018 World Championships.

== Personal life ==
Grießer was born in Gengenbach in 1998. She began gymnastics when she was six years old.

== Gymnastics career ==
=== 2012 ===
Grießer made her international debut at the 2012 European Championships where she helped Germany place fifth as a team.

=== 2014 ===
Grießer turned senior in 2014. She competed at a friendly competition in Länderkampf Kunstturnen where she helped Germany finish first as a team ahead of Romania and Switzerland.

=== 2015 ===
Grießer began the season competing at the São Paulo World Cup where she won bronze on floor exercise behind Flávia Saraiva and Elisabeth Seitz. In May she competed at the Flanders International Team Challenge where she helped Germany place first as a team and individually she placed nineteenth in the all-around. Grießer was selected to represent Germany at the European Games alongside Seitz and Sophie Scheder. Together they won the silver medal in the team competition behind Russia.

In September she competed at the German National Championships where she placed fourth in the all-around, on uneven bars, and on balance beam. She went on to win gold on floor exercise. She next competed at the German World Trials where she placed fourth. Grießer was selected to represent Germany at the World Championships alongside Seitz, Scheder, Pauline Schäfer, Lisa Katharina Hill, and Pauline Tratz. During qualifications they placed twelfth and did not advance to the team final.

=== 2016 ===
In March Grießer competed at the German National Team Cup where she finished fourth in the all-around. She next competed at the DTB Pokal Team Challenge where she finished sixth in the all-around but helped Germany finish second as a team. In April she competed at the Olympic Test Event where she helped Germany place second behind Brazil and qualify a team to the Olympic Games. Individually she placed third on floor exercise.

In June Grießer competed at the German National Championships where she placed sixth in the all-around, fifth on uneven bars, and sixth on floor exercise. The following month she competed at the Olympic Trials where she placed seventh and was not named to the team. She next competed at a friendly competition in Chemnitz where Germany finished in first and individually Grießer finished in twelfth.

In November Grießer competed at the Swiss Cup where she was paired with Lukas Dauser; they finished in seventh place. She ended the season competing at the Cottbus World Cup where she qualified to the uneven bars, balance beam, and floor exercise finals. She finished fourth on uneven bars and balance beam but won silver on floor exercise.

=== 2017 ===
In June Grießer competed at the German National Championships where she placed sixth in the all-around and on floor exercise and won bronze on the uneven bars. She later competed at the 2017 Summer Universiade alongside Kim Bui, Pauline Tratz, and Antonia Alicke. They finished fourth a team. Individually Grießer finished tenth in the all-around, seventh on uneven bars, and sixth on floor exercise. In September she competed at the German World Trials where was placed sixth.

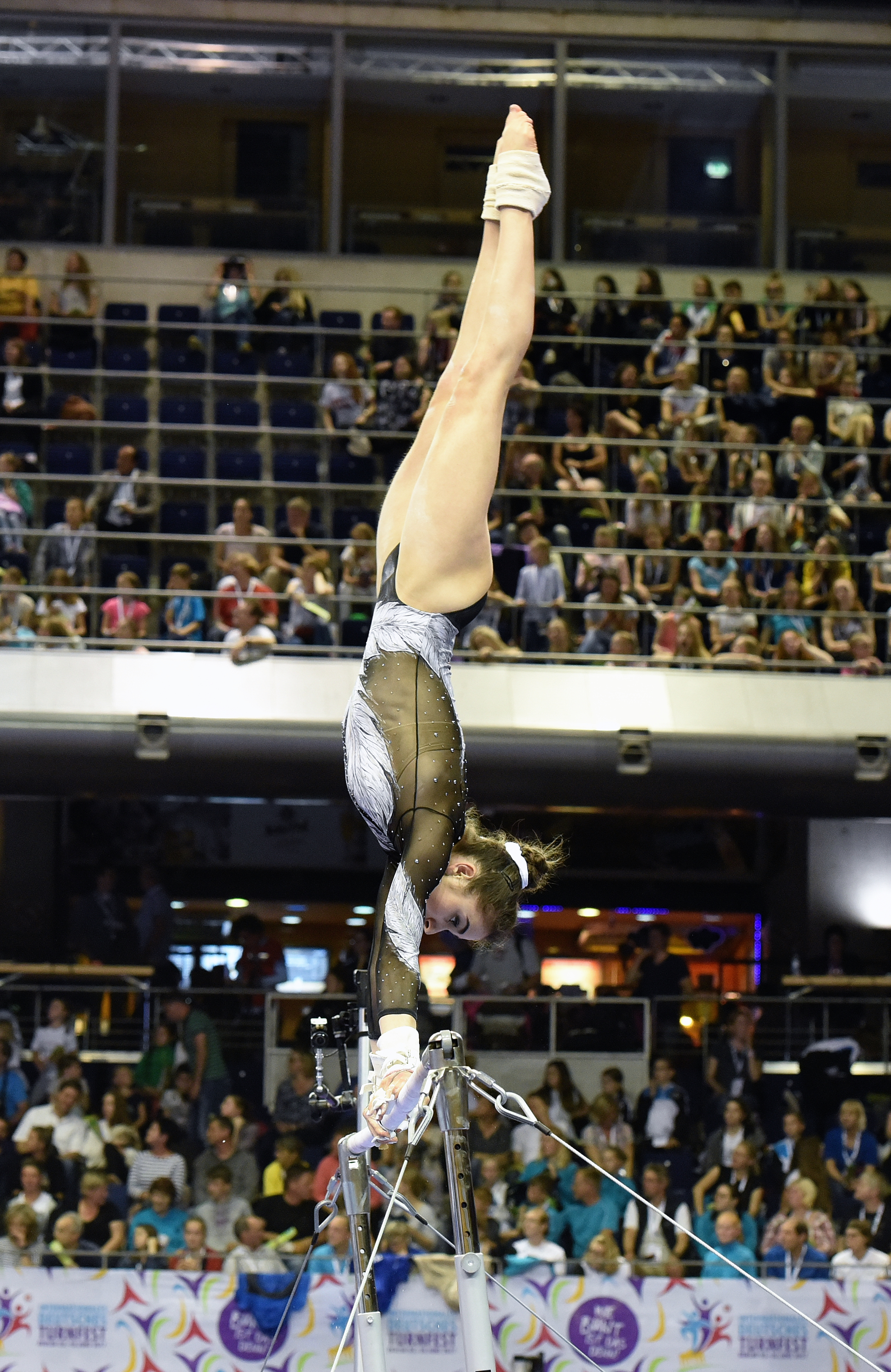
Uneven Bars

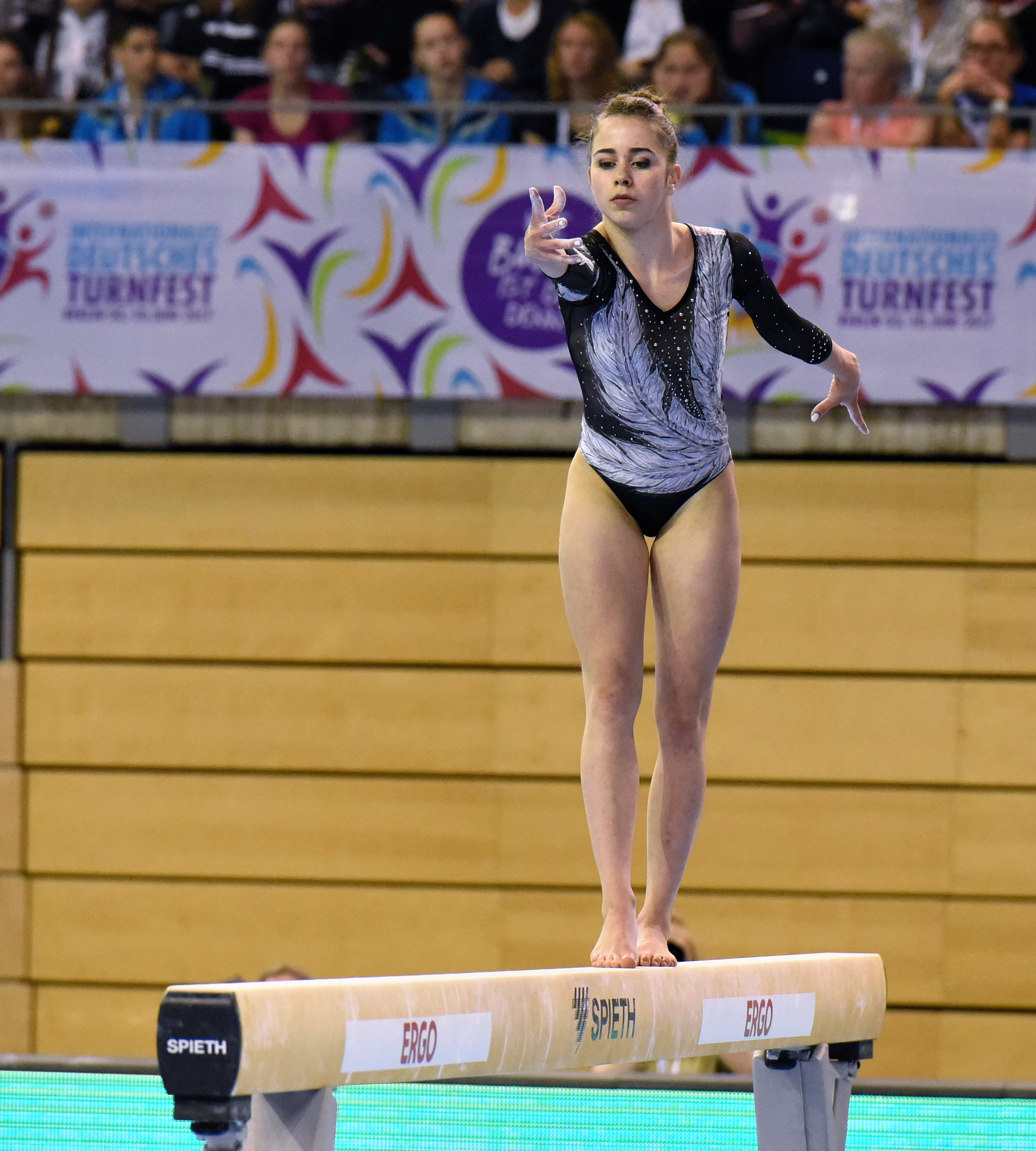
Balance Beam

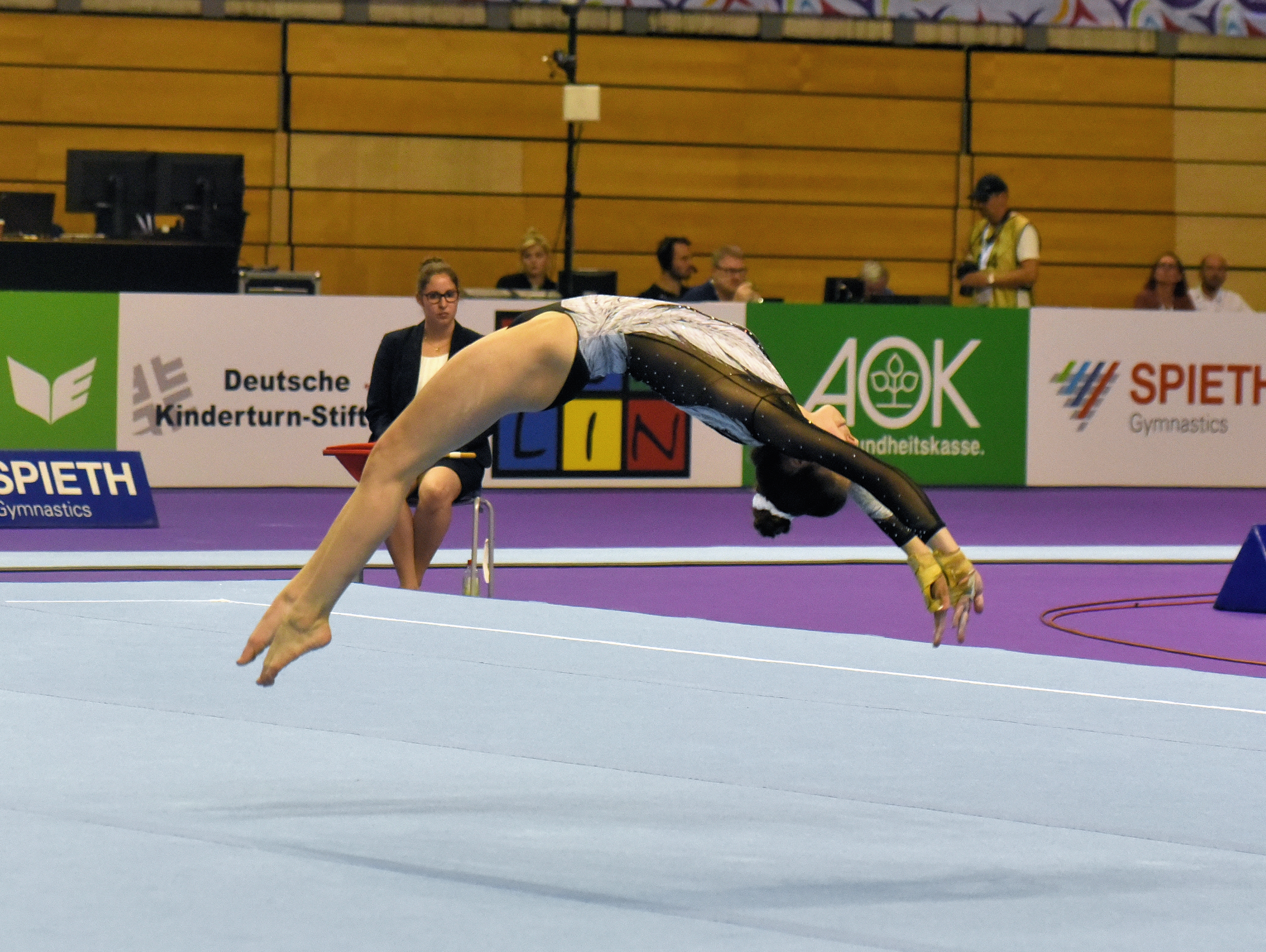
Floor Exercise

Grießer at the 2017 International German Gymnastics Festival

=== 2018 ===
Grießer spent the beginning of 2018 traveling around Australia. In June she competed at the German Euro Trials where she placed fifth in the all-around. She was named to the team alongside Kim Bui, Sarah Voss, Pauline Schäfer, and Emma Höfele. The following month Grisser competed at the Sainté Gym Cup where she placed eighth in the all-around. Additionally Germany placed second behind France in the team competition.

At the European Championships Grießer was the third reserve for the floor exercise final. The German team did not qualify to the team final after Grießer and Voss fell numerous times off of the balance beam.

In September Grießer competed at the German World Trials where she finished fourth in the all-around. Later that month she competed at the German National Championships and finished seventh in the all-around, fourth on balance beam, and first on floor exercise. Grießer was later selected to represent Germany at the 2018 World Championships alongside Elisabeth Seitz, Bui, Scheder, and Voss. Grießer competed at a friendly competition in Rüsselsheim where she helped Germany finish first and individually she finished third in the all-around behind compatriot Kim Bui and Martina Basile of Italy. At the World Championships Grießer helped Germany finish in eighth place. Grießer ended the season competing at the Cottbus World Cup where she finished eighth on floor exercise.

=== 2019 ===
Grießer competed at the DTB Team Challenge and helped Germany place fifth. The following week she competed at the Birmingham World Cup where she place sixth. In April she competed at the European Championships but did not qualify for any event finals. In August she competed at the German National Championships where she placed seventh in the all-around, sixth on balance beam, and third on floor exercise. At the German World Trials Grießer finished fifth in the all-around. She next competed at a friendly competition in Worms, Germany where she finished seventeenth in the all-around but helped Germany finish first as a team. Following the competition Grießer was not named to the team for the World Championships.

=== 2021 ===
Grießer announced her retirement from gymnastics in May 2021, deciding to focus on her medical studies.

== Competitive history ==
| Year | Event | Team | AA | VT | UB | BB | FX |
|---|---|---|---|---|---|---|---|
2012
| 2012 | European Championships | 5 | | | | | |
| 2014 | Länderkampf Kunstturnen | 1st place, gold medalist(s) | | | | | |
| 2015 | São Paulo World Cup | | | | | | 3rd place, bronze medalist(s) |
| 2015 | Flanders International Team Challenge | 1st place, gold medalist(s) | 19 | | | | |
| 2015 | European Games | 2nd place, silver medalist(s) | | | | | |
| 2015 | German Championships | | 4 | | 4 | 4 | 1st place, gold medalist(s) |
| 2015 | World Trials | | 4 | | | | |
| 2015 | Länderkampf Kunstturnen | 2nd place, silver medalist(s) | | | | | |
| 2016 | National Team Cup | | 4 | | | | |
| 2016 | DTB Pokal Team Challenge | 2nd place, silver medalist(s) | 6 | | | | |
| 2016 | Olympic Test Event | 2nd place, silver medalist(s) | | | | | 3rd place, bronze medalist(s) |
| 2016 | German Championships | | 6 | | 5 | | 6 |
| 2016 | Olympic Trials | | 7 | | | | |
| 2016 | Chemnitz Friendly | 1st place, gold medalist(s) | 12 | | | | |
| 2016 | Swiss Cup | 7 | | | | | |
| 2016 | Cottbus World Cup | | | | 4 | 4 | 2nd place, silver medalist(s) |
| 2017 | German Championships | | 6 | | 3rd place, bronze medalist(s) | 6 | |
| 2017 | Summer Universiade | 4 | 10 | | 7 | | 6 |
| 2017 | World Trials | | 6 | | | | |
| 2018 | German Euro Trials | | 5 | | | | |
| 2018 | Sainté Gym Cup | 2nd place, silver medalist(s) | 8 | | | | |
| 2018 | European Championships | R2 | | | | | R3 |
| 2018 | German World Trials | | 4 | | | | |
| 2018 | National Championships | | 7 | | | 4 | 1st place, gold medalist(s) |
| 2018 | Rüsselsheim | 1st place, gold medalist(s) | 3rd place, bronze medalist(s) | | | | |
| 2018 | World Championships | 8 | | | | | |
| 2018 | Cottbus World Cup | | | | | | 8 |
| 2019 | DTB Team Challenge | 5 | | | | | |
| 2019 | Birmingham World Cup | | 6 | | | | |
| 2019 | National Championships | | 7 | | | 6 | 3rd place, bronze medalist(s) |
| 2019 | German World Trials | | 5 | | | | |
| 2019 | Worms Friendly | 1st place, gold medalist(s) | 17 | | | | |
