= Sophie Scheder =

German artistic gymnast

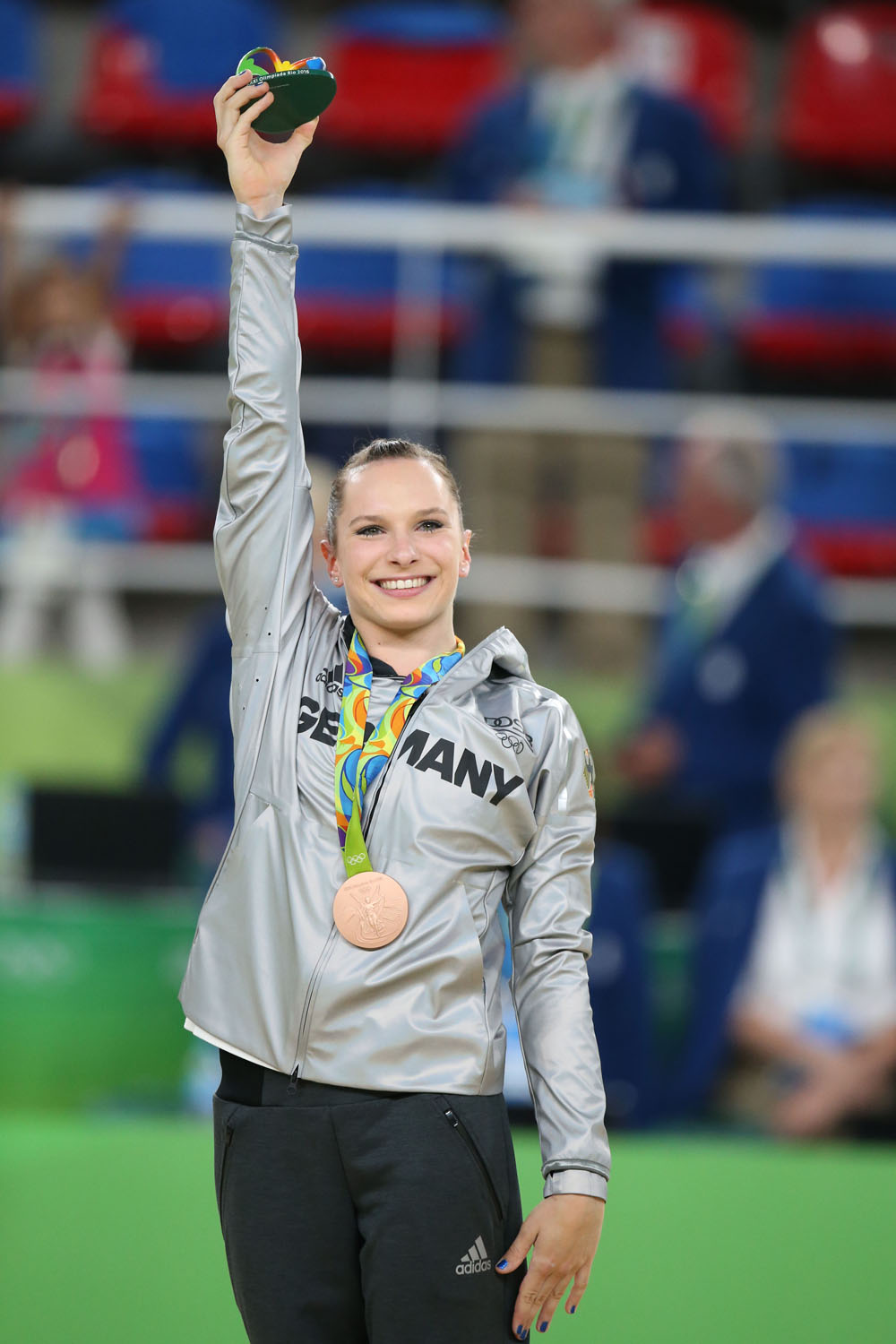
- Scheder wins the bronze medal at the Rio 2016 Summer Olympics

Personal information
- Full name: Sophie Celina Scheder
- Nickname: Soph
- Born: 7 January 1997 (age 29) Wolfsburg, Germany
- Height: 1.67 m (5 ft 6 in)

Gymnastics career
- Discipline: Women's artistic gymnastics
- Country represented: Germany; (2011–2024)
- Club: Chemnitz-Altendorf
- Head coaches: Gabi Frehse, Rene Poutsma
- Retired: 15 May 2024
Medal record
Representing Germany
Olympic Games
Bronze medal – third place	2016 Rio de Janeiro	Uneven bars
European Games
Silver medal – second place	2015 Baku	Team
Silver medal – second place	2015 Baku	Uneven bars
World University Games
Silver medal – second place	2021 Chengdu	Uneven bars

Sophie Celina Scheder (born 7 January 1997) is a retired German artistic gymnast. She is the 2016 Olympic bronze medalist on the uneven bars.

== Senior career ==
=== 2013 ===
Scheder competed at the 2013 World Artistic Gymnastics Championships, where she finished 5th on the uneven bars.

=== 2014 ===
Scheder started the season competing at the American Cup held in Greensboro, North Carolina, where she placed 7th. A few weeks later she competed at the Cottbus Challenge Cup, where she won the bars title with a 14.925. At the 2014 European Artistic Gymnastics Championships in Sofia, she again made the bars final and placed 5th with a score of 14.733. At the 2014 World Artistic Gymnastics Championships in Nanning, she only competed in qualifications, as a fall on the uneven bars prevented her from making the final.

=== 2015 ===
At the 2015 São Paulo Challenge Cup, Scheder captured two medals, a silver on the uneven bars with a 14.875 and a bronze on balance beam with a 14.0. She was selected to compete at the 1st European Games in Baku, along with Elisabeth Seitz and Leah Griesser. There, she placed 4th in the All-Around with a score of 54.932, 2nd on the uneven bars with a 15.2 and 2nd with her team. In October, she competed at the 2015 World Artistic Gymnastics Championships in Glasgow along with Elisabeth Seitz, Pauline Schäfer, Leah Griesser, Pauline Tratz and Lisa Katharina Hill, where they placed 12th as a team. Individually, she placed 8th on bars with a 14.6.

=== 2016: Rio Summer Olympics ===
Scheder started the season by winning the bars and beam titles and also placing 2nd in the all-around at the German National Team Cup. Two weeks later, she competed at the DTB-Pokal Stuttgart World Cup, where she finished in a historic 1st place with a score of 57.032. After the competition, she was selected to represent her country at the 2016 Olympic Test Event. At the 2016 Summer Olympics, she helped the German team finish in sixth place and also finished 23rd in the individual all-around. At the uneven bars, Scheder had a 15.566 score and claimed the bronze medal behind Madison Kocian and Aliya Mustafina, becoming the first German gymnast to win an uneven bars medal since Dagmar Kersten in 1988, and the first for modern day Germany.

=== 2017 ===
In April 2017, Scheder underwent knee surgery in Vail, Colorado after experiencing persisting, heavy pains in her knees.

=== 2019 ===
In September Scheder was named to the team to compete at the 2019 World Championships in Stuttgart alongside Kim Bui, Emelie Petz, Sarah Voss, and Elisabeth Seitz. She ended up withdrawing due to injury.
