= David Jessen =

Czech artistic gymnast (born 1996)

- Born: 5 December 1996 (age 29) Brno, Czech Republic
- Height: 1.75 m (5 ft 9 in)
- Relatives: Hana Říčná (mother)

Gymnastics career
- Discipline: Men's artistic gymnastics
- Country represented: Czech Republic
- Former countries represented: United States
- College team: Stanford Cardinal
- Club: Sokol Brno I; Parkettes
- Head coach: Petr Hedbávný
- Eponymous skills: Jessen (pommel horse)

David Jessen (born 5 December 1996) is a Czech male artistic gymnast. He represented the Czech Republic at the 2016 and 2020 Summer Olympics.

== Early life and education ==
David Jessen was born on 5 December 1996 in Brno, Czech Republic. His mother is Czech 1988 Olympic gymnast Hana Říčná, and his father, Lorin Jessen, is an American gymnastics coach. His younger sister Sandra also competed in gymnastics at Stanford. The family moved to the United States when Jessen was young, and he began gymnastics when he was two years old.

Jessen studied Molecular, Cellular and Developmental Biology at Stanford University where he was part of the Stanford Cardinal men’s gymnastics team. He then attended Temple/St. Luke's School of Medicine.

== Gymnastics career ==
Jessen originally competed for the United States and was a member of the junior national team; however, he switched to competing for the Czech Republic in 2014 and became the Czech all-around champion. His nationality change was officially approved by the International Gymnastics Federation in 2015. He competed alongside Martin Konečný and Daniel Radovesnický and the 2015 European Games, and they finished 22nd in the team competition. He then competed at the 2015 World Championships and placed 50th in the all-around during the qualification round, qualifying for the 2016 Olympic Test Event. There, he finished 32nd in the all-around and qualified for the 2016 Olympic Games.

Jessen competed at the 2016 Summer Olympics and finished 47th in the all-around during the qualification round. He also competed at the 2017 World Championships and finished 35th in the all-around during the qualification round. At the 2019 Szombathely World Challenge Cup, he qualified for the horizontal bar final and finished seventh. He then competed at the 2019 World Championships and finished 52nd in the all-around qualification round.

Jessen competed with the Czech team that finished seventh at the 2020 European Championships, and he was the first reserve for the horizontal bar final. He qualified for the all-around final at the 2021 European Championships, finishing 18th.

After Manrique Larduet from Cuba withdrew, Jessen was called up to compete at the 2020 Summer Olympics as the first alternate. He placed 57th in the all-around during the qualification round. After the Olympic Games, Jessen retired from gymnastics to attend medical school.

== Eponymous skill ==
Jessen has a pommel horse skill named after him in the Code of Points.

Apparatus	Name	Description	Difficulty (Note: Valid for the 2025–2028 Code of Points.)	Added to Code of Points
Pommel horse	Jessen	DSA with hop backward through handstand on the other end	D (0.4)	2019 Doha World Cup

== See also ==
- Nationality changes in gymnastics
