= Ludovico Edalli =

Italian artistic gymnast

- Born: 18 December 1993 (age 32) Busto Arsizio, Varese, Italy
- Height: 1.68 m (5 ft 6 in)

Gymnastics career
- Discipline: Men's artistic gymnastics
- Country represented: Italy (2014–2023)
- Club: Pro Patria Bustese
- Head coach: Paolo Siviero
- Retired: 8 May 2023
Medal record
Men's artistic gymnastics
Representing Italy
Mediterranean Games
Silver medal – second place	2013 Mersin	Team
Youth Olympic Games
Bronze medal – third place	2010 Singapore	Parallel bars

Ludovico Edalli (born 18 December 1993) is an Italian retired artistic gymnast. He won a bronze medal on the parallel bars at the 2010 Summer Youth Olympics. He competed at the 2016 and 2020 Summer Olympics.

== Gymnastics career ==
Edalli began gymnastics when he was four years old. He finished tenth in the all-around at the 2010 Junior European Championships. He then represented Italy at the 2010 Summer Youth Olympics and won a bronze medal on the parallel bars.

Edalli advanced into the all-around final at the 2013 European Championships and finished 13th. He then helped the Italian team win a silver medal at the 2013 Mediterranean Games. He missed the 2014 European Championships due to an injury. He returned in time for the 2014 World Championships, where he advanced to the all-around final and placed 24th.

At the 2015 European Championships, Edalli finished 16th in the all-around final. He then placed 78th in the all-around qualifications at the 2015 World Championships. He qualified for the 2016 Summer Olympics, securing one of the spots available at the Olympic Test Event in Rio de Janeiro. There, he finished 44th in the all-around qualifications and did not advance into any finals.

Edalli competed with the Italian team that placed eighth at the 2018 European Championships. At the 2018 Mediterranean Games, he helped Italy place fourth. He was the second reserve for the all-around final at the 2018 World Championships.

Edalli finished 15th in the all-around at the 2019 European Championships, and he advanced into the horizontal bar final, finishing fifth. At the 2019 World Championships, he finished 17th in the all-around final and earned a berth to the 2020 Summer Olympics.

Edalli represented Italy at the 2020 Summer Olympics and was the second reserve for the all-around final after finishing 38th in the qualifications. He competed at the 2022 DTB Pokal Team Challenge where the Italian men's team won the silver medal behind the United States. He announced his retirement from the sport on 8 May 2023.
