= Houry Gebeshian =

Armenian-American artistic gymnast

- Հուրի Կէպեշեան
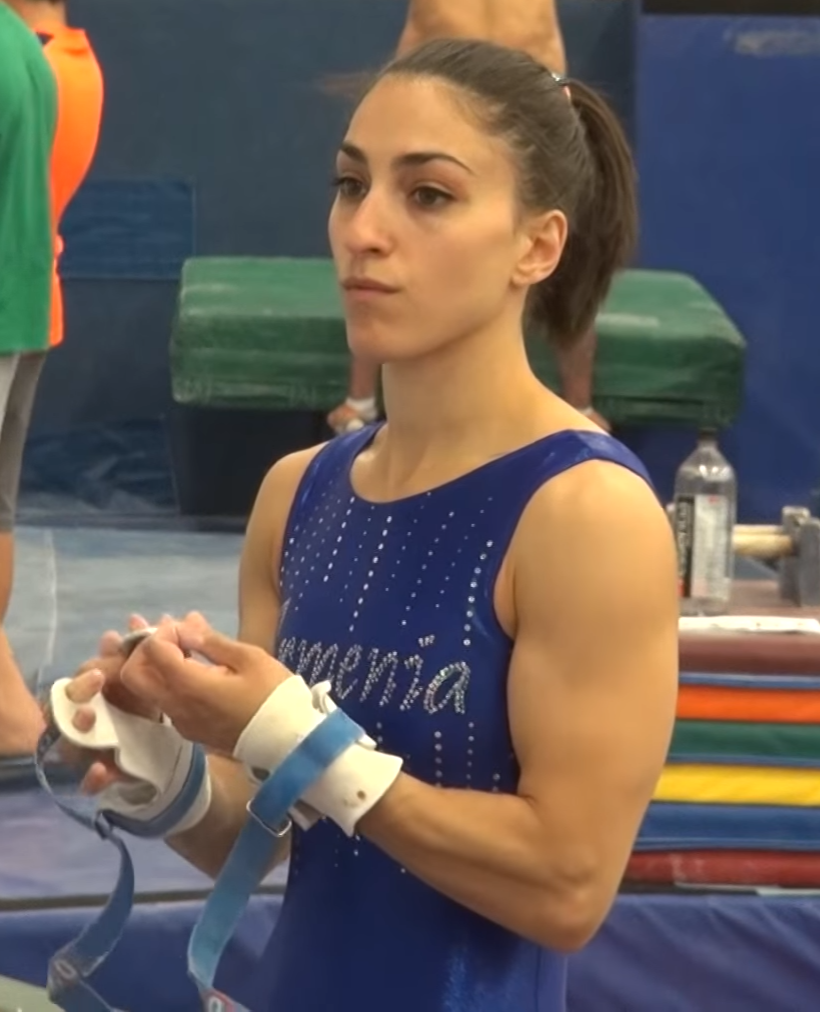
- Gebeshian in 2016

Personal information
- Born: July 27, 1989 (age 37) Cambridge, Massachusetts, United States

Gymnastics career
- Discipline: Women's artistic gymnastics
- Country represented: Armenia
- College team: Iowa Hawkeyes
- Eponymous skills: Gebeshian (uneven bars)

Houry Gebeshian (Armenian: Հուրի Կէպեշեան; born July 27, 1989) is an Armenian-American artistic gymnast, who has represented Armenia at the 2011 World Artistic Gymnastics Championships, the 2015 European Artistic Gymnastics Championships, and the 2016 Summer Olympics. She was a member of the Iowa Hawkeyes team during the 2008 to 2011 seasons.

== Early life and education ==
Gebeshian was born on July 27, 1989, in Cambridge, Massachusetts, to parents Christine Abrahamian and Hagop Gebeshian. She graduated from Newton North High School in 2007.

== Gymnastics career ==
=== 2005-2007: Club career ===
Gebeshian placed 34th at the 2005 J.O. Nationals, her first J.O. competition. During her club competitive years, she trained at Massachusetts Gymnastics Center; under coaches Patrick Palmer, Shixin Mao and Joe Massimo.

=== 2008-2011: College career ===
Houry started competing for the Iowa Hawkeyes team in the 2008 season. She was a steady bars and beam worker, competing at every meet during the regular season. In her sophomore year, in 2009, Gebeshian was a consistent all-arounder, competing in every event at every meet. She was the Big-10 beam champion in 2010 with a score of 9.950. In her senior season, in 2011, Gebeshian advanced to the 2011 NCAA Women's Gymnastics Championship as an individual all-arounder.

=== 2011-present: International career for Armenia ===
In an article with International Gymnast Magazine, Gebeshian said that she was first inspired to compete for Armenia when her mother informed her that as an Armenian by birth, she was eligible for dual citizenship and thus able to represent Armenia at the Olympics if she wished to. Gebeshian's mother contacted a parent of another gymnast training at the same gym, who was the Olympic liaison for Armenia, checking the possibility of Gebeshian representing Armenia as being of Armenian descent. He told her to "go for it!". Gebeshian's family helped foot the bill for finances for Gebeshian to attend the 2011 World Artistic Gymnastics Championships in October 2011 in Tokyo, Japan. She finished the event with a score of 45.899, placing 128th all-around. She did not receive a berth to the 2012 Olympics but was third reserve.

After four years of international hiatus, Gebeshian returned to international competition at the 2015 European Artistic Gymnastics Championships in April 2015, held in Montpellier, France. She qualified for the all-around final, finishing 19th overall with a score of 51.198.

Gebeshian competed at the 2015 World Artistic Gymnastics Championships in Glasgow, Scotland, and qualified for the Olympics test events. On April 17, Gebeshian qualified for the 2016 Olympics when she competed at the Olympic test events in Rio de Janeiro, Brazil. Gebeshian represented Armenia at the Olympics competing at the artistic gymnastics event on 7 August 2016 in Rio de Janeiro, Brazil.

== Eponymous skill ==
Gebeshian has an eponymous uneven bars mount listed in the Code of Points.

Apparatus	Name	Description	Difficulty (Note: Valid for the 2025-2028 Code of Points)	Added to the Code of Points
Uneven bars	Gebeshian	Hecht jump (legs together) with hand repulsion and 1/1 turn (360°) over low bar to hang on high bar	D	2016 Olympic Games

== Personal life ==
Gebeshian graduated from the University of Iowa in 2011, with a bachelor's degree in athletic training. In 2012, she started her graduate education at Wake Forest School of Medicine, graduating in 2014 with a master's degree in medical science and now practices as a physician assistant at University Hospitals Cleveland Medical Center in Cleveland, Ohio. She worked at Precision Choreography.

She maintains dual citizenship of America and Armenia.

== See also ==
- List of gymnasts
- List of people from Massachusetts
- List of University of Iowa alumni
- List of Wake Forest University people
