= Vid Hidvégi =

Hungarian gymnast

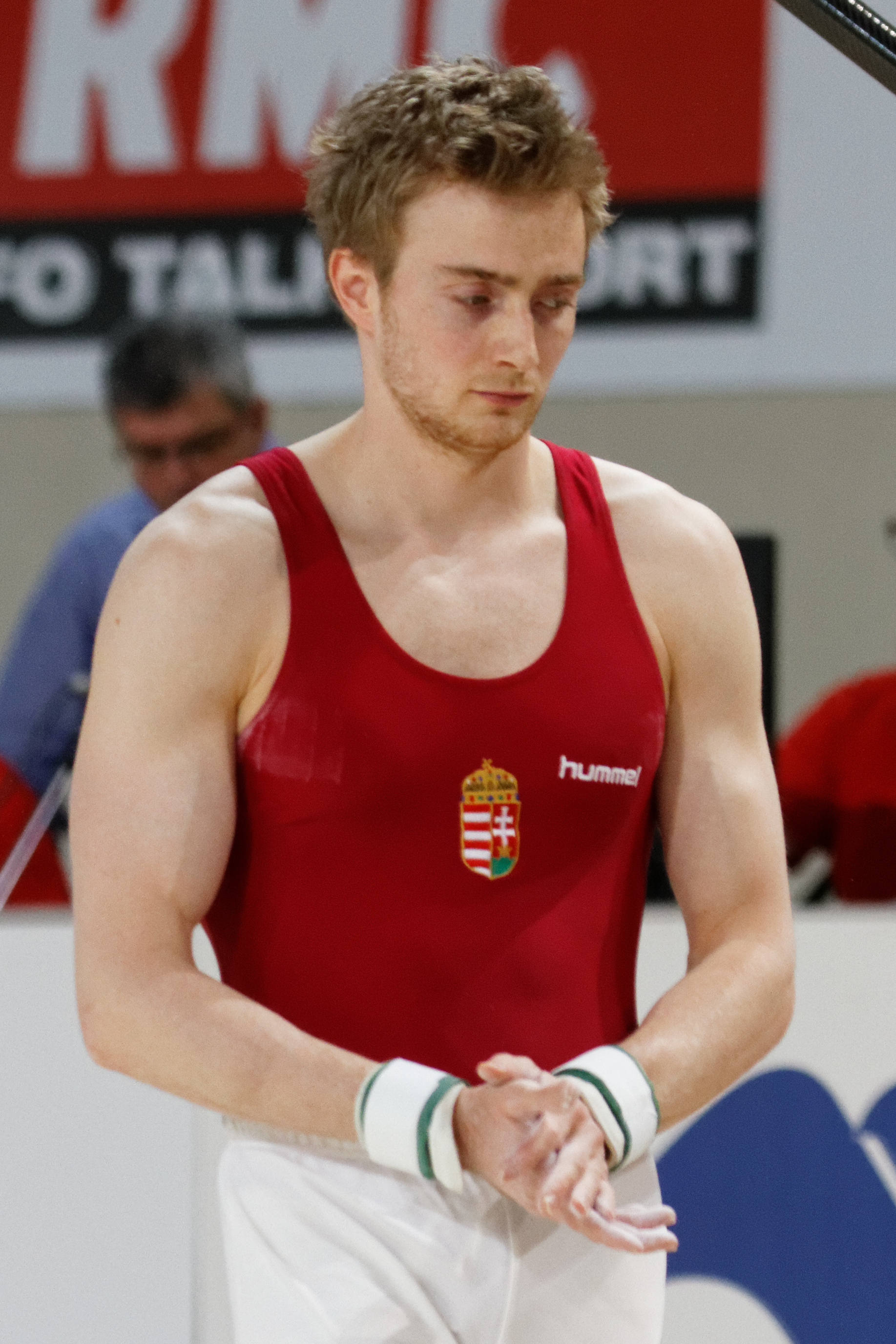
- Vid Hidvégi at the 2015 European Championships in Montpellier, France.

Personal information
- Full name: Vid Hidvégi
- Born: August 23, 1986 (age 40) Budapest, Hungary
- Height: 1.70 m (5 ft 7 in)

Gymnastics career
- Discipline: Men's artistic gymnastics
- Country represented: Hungary
- Club: KSI
- Head coach: Béla Laufer
Medal record
Representing Hungary
Universiade
Silver medal – second place	2007 Bangkok	Pommel horse

Vid Hidvégi (Hungarian pronunciation: [ˈvid ˈhidveːɡi]; born 23 August 1986) is a Hungarian artistic gymnast and pommel horse specialist. A student of the Eszterházy Károly College, he finished runner-up at the 2007 Summer Universiade.

Hidvégi finished fifth at the 2012 Gymnastics Olympic Test Event and qualified for the 2012 Summer Olympics held in London. At the Olympics he went to the pommel horse final with the third best result. In the final, however, Hidvégi made a mistake and fell off the horse, thus got only 14.300 points and finished eighth.

== Awards ==
- Junior Prima Award (2012)
