= Andriy Sienichkin =

Ukrainian artistic gymnast (born 1991)

Andrii Sienichkin
- Full name: Andrii Oleksiyovych Sienichkin
- Born: 1 May 1991 (age 35)
- Height: 1.75 m (5 ft 9 in)

Gymnastics career
- Discipline: Men's artistic gymnastics
- Country represented: Ukraine (2013)

Andrii Oleksiyovych Sienichkin (Ukrainian: Андрій Олексійович Сєнічкін; born 1 May 1991) is a Ukrainian male artistic gymnast and a member of the national team. He participated at the 2015 World Artistic Gymnastics Championships in Glasgow, and qualified for the 2016 Summer Olympics.
