= Dennis Goossens =

Belgian artistic gymnast (born 1993)

- Full name: Dennis Goossens
- Born: 16 December 1993 (age 32) Elversele, Belgium
- Height: 1.60 m (5 ft 3 in)

Gymnastics career
- Discipline: Men's artistic gymnastics
- Country represented: Belgium (2013)
- Club: Topsportcentrum
- Head coach: Koen van Damme

Dennis Goossens (born 16 December 1993) is a Belgian male artistic gymnast, representing his nation in international competitions. He participated in two editions of the World Championships (2013 in Antwerp, and 2015 in Glasgow, Scotland), and qualified for the 2016 Summer Olympics.
