= Andreas Bretschneider =

German artistic gymnast

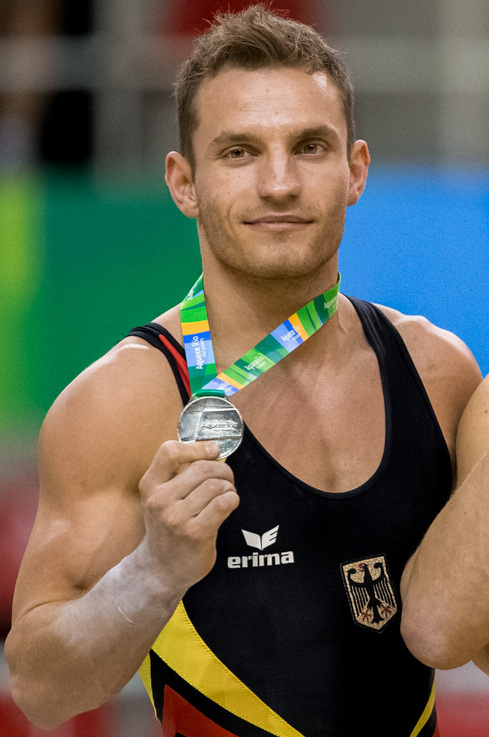
- Bretschneider at the 2016 Gymnastics Olympic Test Event in Rio de Janeiro

Personal information
- Full name: Andreas Bretschneider
- Born: 4 August 1989 (age 37) Berlin, Germany
- Height: 1.67 m (5 ft 6 in)

Gymnastics career
- Discipline: Men's artistic gymnastics
- Country represented: Germany; (2015–2022)
- Club: KTV Chemnitz
Medal record
Representing Germany
FIG World Cup
| Gold medal – first place | 2017 Cottbus | Horizontal Bar |

Andreas Bretschneider (born August 4, 1989) is a German artistic gymnast and member of the national team. He participated at the 2015 World Artistic Gymnastics Championships in Glasgow, and eventually competed for the German squad at the 2016 Summer Olympics, finishing seventh in the artistic team all-around tournament, and twentieth in the individual all-around.

Bretschneider has one competition-verified original skill named after him on the horizontal bar, the double-twisting (tucked) Kovac. It has a difficulty score of H, one of the highest in men's gymnastics. Bretschneider was once widely expected to advance the Bretschneider on the horizontal bar himself to layout in competition, and the skill was scored ahead of time by the International Gymnastics Federation (FIG) and unofficially coined the Bretschneider 2 on the horizontal bar to better facilitate him as they awaited the skill to be successfully completed in competition. He had started submitting the skill to the (FIG) for verification since the world championships in 2013, but had not been able to further compete it in a suitable setting after the 2016 Summer Olympics in Rio de Janeiro due to injuries. Taking advantage of that, in June 2017, Hidetaka Miyachi of Japan then beat Bretschneider to the punch and completed the first double-twisting layout Kovac or now the Miyachi on the horizontal bar, rated I.

On November 23–26, 2017, Bretschneider won the gold medal in the horizontal bar individual event final at the 2017 Cottbus World Cup in Cottbus, Germany, with a score of 14.566.
