= Andrey Likhavitski =

Belarusian artistic gymnast (born 1986)

- Born: 23 June 1986 (age 40) Samara, Russian SFSR, Soviet Union
- Height: 1.72 m (5 ft 8 in)

Gymnastics career
- Discipline: Men's artistic gymnastics
- Country represented: Belarus (2015)
- Former countries represented: Russia
Medal record
Men's artistic gymnastics
Representing Belarus
European Games
Bronze medal – third place	2019 Minsk	Pommel horse

Andrey Likhavitski (Belarusian: Андрэй Ліхавіцкі; born 23 June 1986) is a Belarusian male artistic gymnast and a member of the national team. He participated at the 2013, 2014 and 2015 World Artistic Gymnastics Championships, and qualified for the 2016 Summer Olympics where he finished in 18th place in the men's artistic individual all-around event.
