= Oskar Kirmes =

Finnish artistic gymnast

- Full name: Karl Oskar Kirmes
- Born: 19 December 1995 (age 30) Reykjavík, Iceland
- Height: 1.70 m (5 ft 7 in)

Gymnastics career
- Discipline: Men's artistic gymnastics
- Country represented: Finland; (2013–present)
- Club: Espoon Telinetaiturit
- Head coach: Timo Holopainen

Karl Oskar Kirmes (born 19 December 1995) is a Finnish male artistic gymnast representing his nation in international competitions.

== Life and career ==
Kirmes was born in Reykjavík, Iceland, to an Estonian father and Swedish mother. His father, Mati Kirmes, represented the Soviet Union in gymnastics and has also worked as an international coach, while his mother, Lina, competed for Sweden in the sport. His younger brother Robert represented Finland in gymnastics at the 2019 World Championships in Stuttgart, Germany, and his cousin David Rumbutis competed in the sport at the 2017 European Youth Olympic Festival [EYOF] in Győr, Hungary. He participated in every edition of the World Championships since his debut in 2013, and qualified for the 2016 Summer Olympics, becoming the first male gymnast from his nation to do so in forty-four years.
