= Ryan Patterson =

South African artistic gymnast

- Born: 10 January 1994 (age 32)
- Height: 177 cm (5 ft 10 in)

Gymnastics career
- Discipline: Men's artistic gymnastics
- Country represented: South Africa; (2014)
- College team: University of California, Berkeley
- Club: Hjmouldie

Ryan Patterson (born 10 January 1994) is a South African male artistic gymnast who qualified to compete at the 2016 Summer Olympics held in Rio de Janeiro, Brazil.

== Personal life ==
Patterson was born on 10 January 1994. He has dual South African and United States citizenship. He attended the University of California, Berkeley in the United States.

== Gymnastics ==
Paterson represented South Africa at the 2010 Summer Youth Olympics held in Singapore, where he finished 33rd in the men's artistic qualification with a total score of 77.700.

Patterson finished 72nd at the 2014 World Artistic Gymnastics Championships, held in Nanjing, China, with a total score of 81.373; he scored 14.766 on the floor, 12.333 for the pommel horse, 13.333 on the rings, 14.400 for the vault, 13.100 on the parallel bars and 13.441 on the horizontal bar.

At the 2015 World Artistic Gymnastics Championships, held in Glasgow, United Kingdom he finished 73rd out of 182 in the men’s all-around qualifications with a total score of 82.132 across the six apparatus. Patterson was the highest finishing African athlete ahead of Algerian Bourguieg Mohamed Abdeldjalil who placed 83rd. This earned Patterson a place at the Rio Olympic Test Event in 2016.

In 2016, Patterson became the first male South African gymnast to qualify for the Olympics in 50 years. At the Olympic Test Event, held in the Rio Olympic Arena, he scored an all-around total of 82.932 to finish 44th overall and secure the international qualification standard for the men's competition at the 2016 Summer Olympics to be held in Rio de Janeiro. However, the South African Sports Confederation and Olympic Committee (SASCOC) still had to confirm his nomination to compete. His participation was confirmed by SASCOC on 11 May 2016. At the 2016 Summer Olympics, he finished 46th out of 49 in the men's all-around qualifications with a total score of 80.690. He did not advance to any finals.
