= 2014 European Artistic Gymnastics Championships =

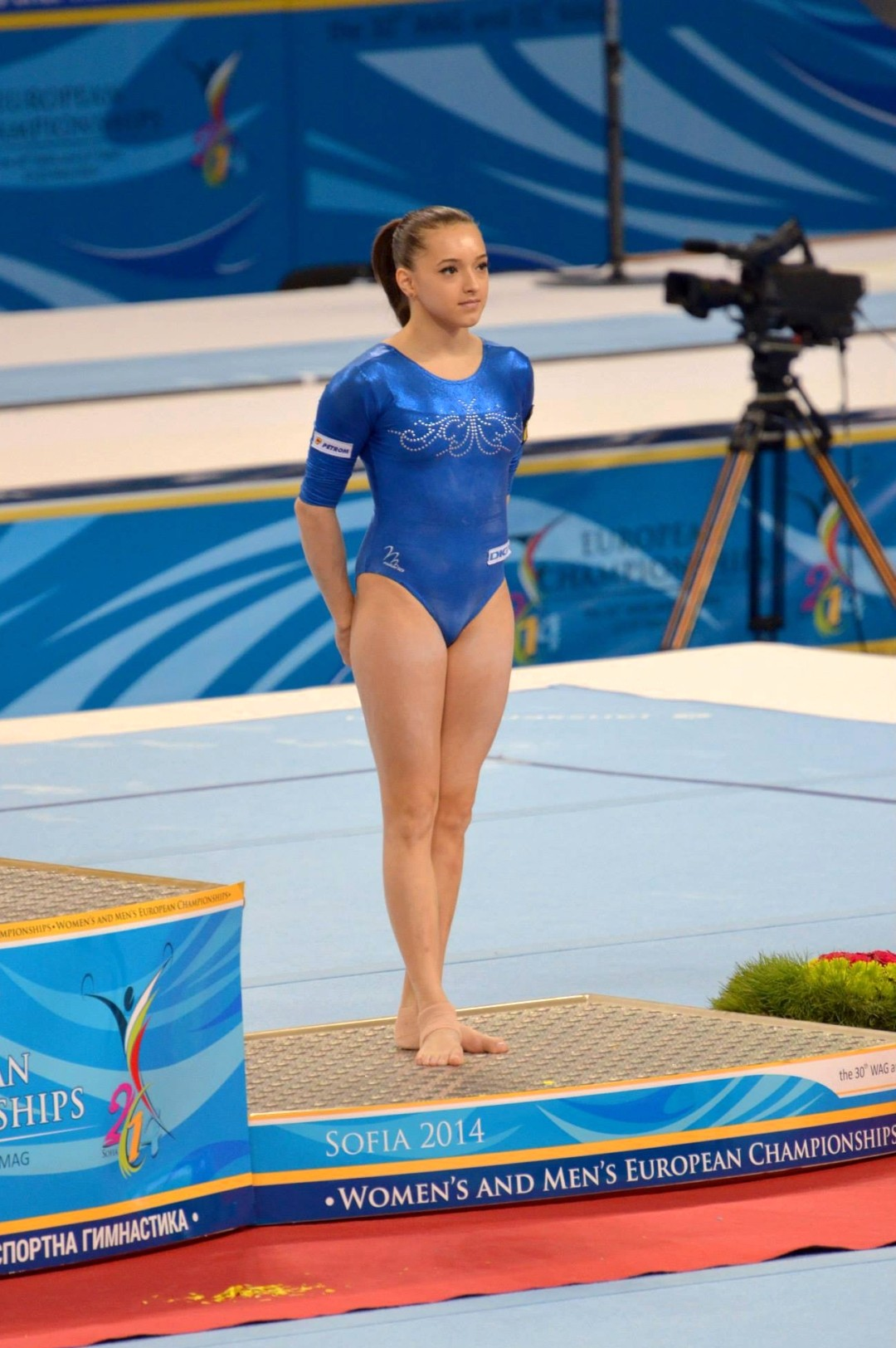
Larisa Iordache competing in 2014.

The 2014 European Artistic Gymnastics Championships can refer to either or both of the following:

- The 30th European Women's Artistic Gymnastics Championships (May 12–18, 2014)
- The 31st European Men's Artistic Gymnastics Championships (May 19–25, 2014)
