= Igor Radivilov =

Ukrainian gymnast (born 1992)

Igor Radivilov Ігор Радівілов
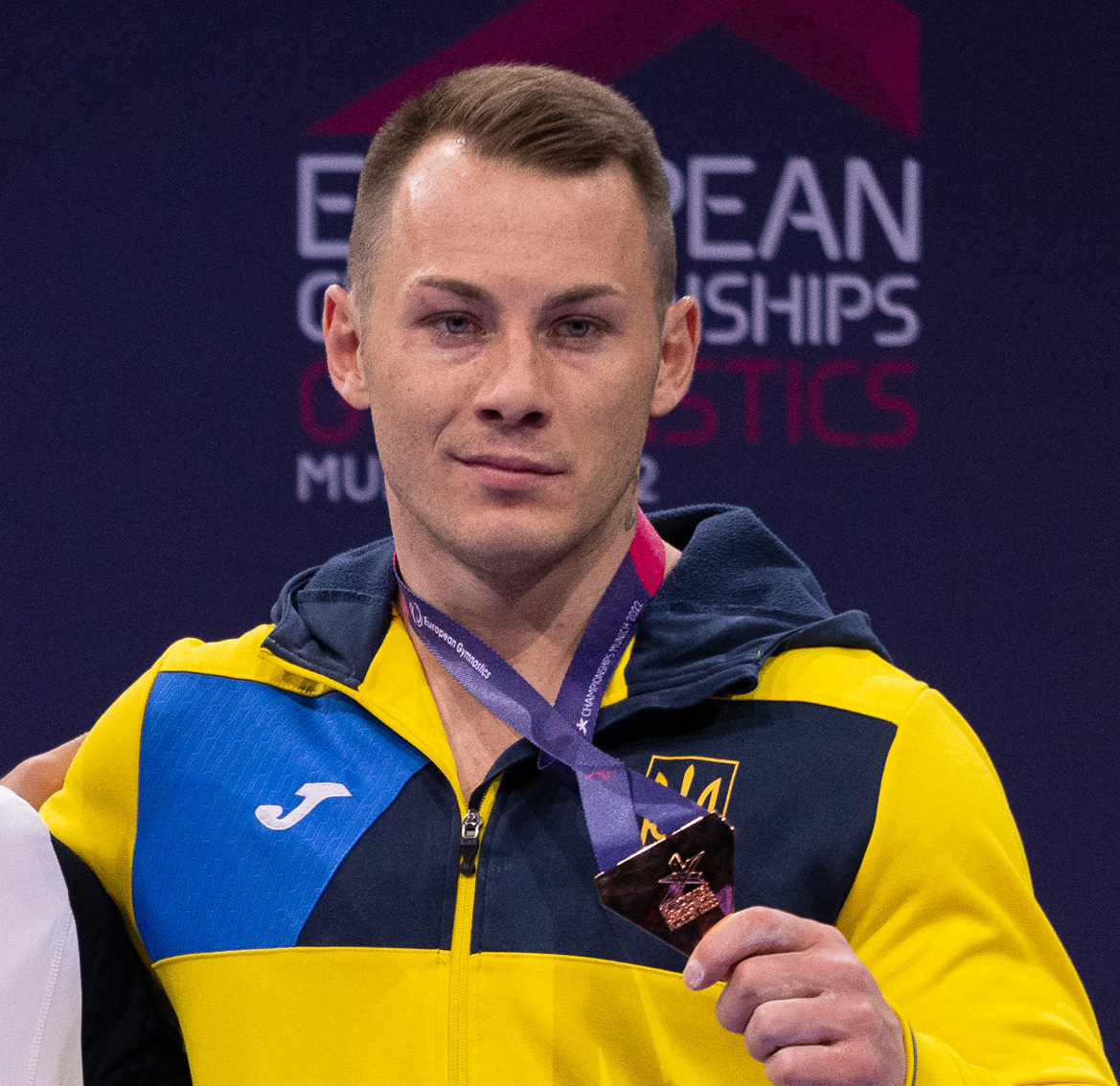
- Radivilov at the 2022 European Championships

Personal information
- Full name: Igor Vitaliyovych Radivilov
- Alternative name: Ihor Radivilov
- Born: 19 October 1992 (age 33) Mariupol, Ukraine
- Height: 5 ft 6 in (168 cm)
- Spouse: Angelina Kysla (m. 2016)

Gymnastics career
- Discipline: Men's artistic gymnastics
- Country represented: Ukraine; (2007–2024)
- Club: Spartak, Donetsk
- Head coach: Vyacheslav Lavrukhin
- Retired: December 1, 2024
Medal record
Men's artistic gymnastics
Representing Ukraine
Event	1st	2nd	3rd
Olympic Games	0	0	1
World Championships	0	2	2
European Games	0	1	2
European Championships	5	4	5
Summer Universiade	0	4	3
Total	5	11	13
Olympic Games
Bronze medal – third place	2012 London	Vault
World Championships
Silver medal – second place	2014 Nanning	Vault
Silver medal – second place	2017 Montreal	Vault
Bronze medal – third place	2019 Stuttgart	Vault
Bronze medal – third place	2022 Liverpool	Vault
European Games
Silver medal – second place	2015 Baku	Team
Bronze medal – third place	2019 Minsk	Rings
Bronze medal – third place	2019 Minsk	Vault
European Championships
Gold medal – first place	2013 Moscow	Rings
Gold medal – first place	2020 Mersin	Vault
Gold medal – first place	2020 Mersin	Team
Gold medal – first place	2021 Basel	Vault
Gold medal – first place	2024 Rimini	Team
Silver medal – second place	2012 Montpellier	Vault
Silver medal – second place	2014 Sofia	Vault
Silver medal – second place	2015 Montpellier	Vault
Silver medal – second place	2018 Glasgow	Vault
Bronze medal – third place	2014 Sofia	Team
Bronze medal – third place	2017 Cluj-Napoca	Rings
Bronze medal – third place	2020 Mersin	Rings
Bronze medal – third place	2022 Munich	Vault
Bronze medal – third place	2023 Antalya	Vault
Summer Universiade
Silver medal – second place	2017 Taipei	Team
Silver medal – second place	2013 Kazan	Team
Silver medal – second place	2015 Gwangju	Rings
Silver medal – second place	2015 Gwangju	Vault
Bronze medal – third place	2013 Kazan	Rings
Bronze medal – third place	2013 Kazan	Vault
Bronze medal – third place	2015 Gwangju	Team

Igor (Ihor) Vitaliyovych Radivilov (Ukrainian: Ігор Віталійович Радівілов; born 19 October 1992) is a retired Ukrainian gymnast and four-time Olympian, having competed at the 2012, 2016, 2020, and 2024 Olympic Games. Although he competed on all apparatuses, he was best known as a vault and rings specialist.

== Personal life ==
Radivilov was born on 19 October 1992 in Mariupol, eastern Ukraine. On 4 September 2016, he married Ukrainian gymnast Angelina Kysla.

== Career ==
=== 2012–2016 ===
Radivilov won silver medal in vault at the 2012 European Championships in Montpellier, France. He competed for the national team at the 2012 Summer Olympics in the men's artistic team all-around and the men's vault. He earned a bronze medal in the vault final at 2012 Summer Olympics with a score of 16.316. He also finished in fourth place in the team all-around final as part of the Ukrainian team along with Mykola Kuksenkov, Oleg Stepko, Vitalii Nakonechnyi and Oleg Verniaiev. Ukraine also takes pride on Radivilov being their first Olympic medalist born in the post-Soviet era.

Radivilov won gold in rings at the 2013 European Championships. At the 2013 Summer Universiade in Kazan, he and the Ukrainian team (Verniaiev, Stepko, Petro Pakhnyuk and Maksym Semiankiv) finished second in the team final. He won bronze in the rings and vault finals behind Russian gymnast Denis Ablyazin.

On May 19–25, 2014, at the 2014 European Championships in Sofia. Radivilov contributed scores of 14.266 (floor), 15.300 (rings) and 14.700 (vault), helping his country win the team bronze medal with a total score of 262.087 points, behind Great Britain. In event finals, Radivilov won the silver medal on vault (15.050) behind Ablyazin again.

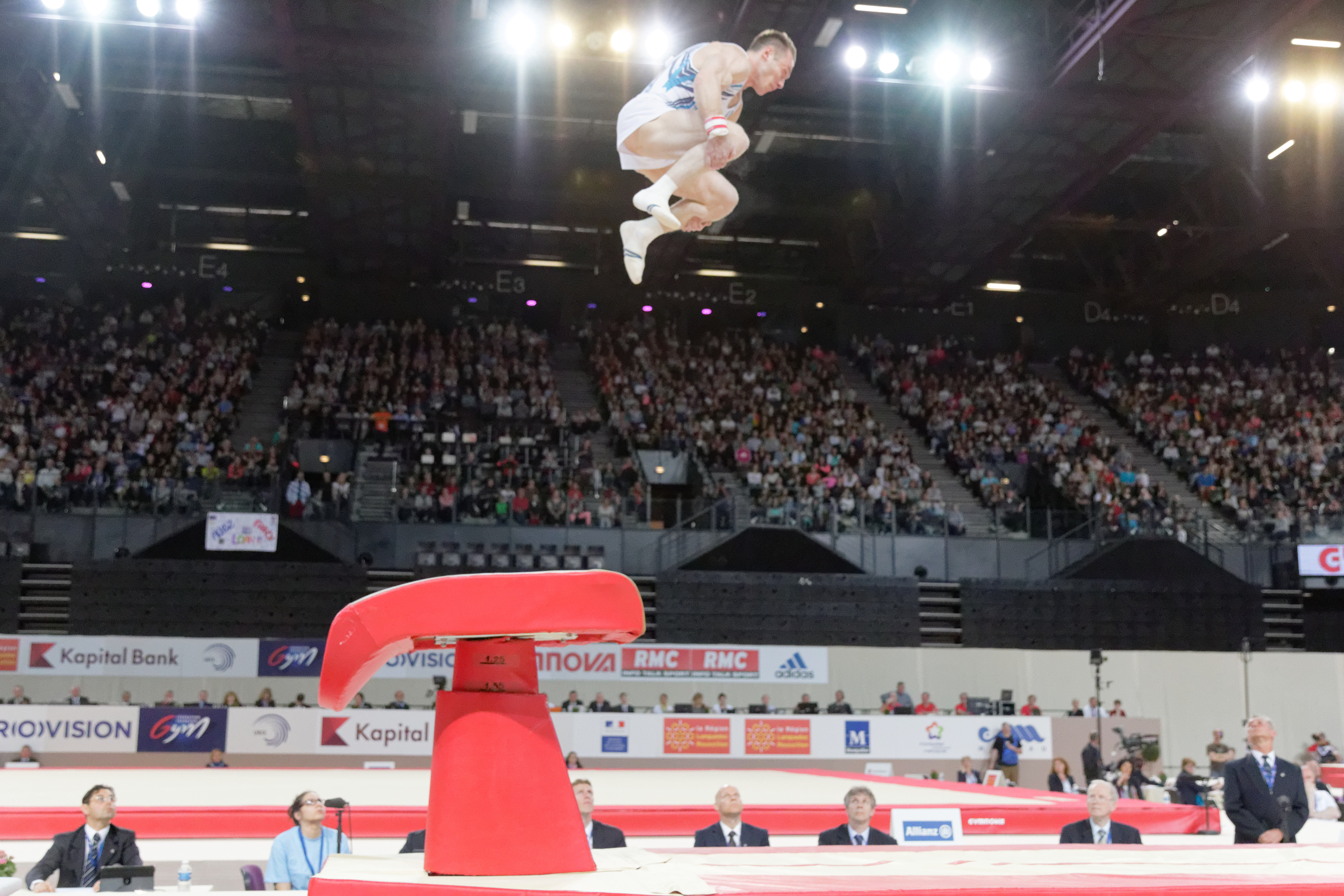
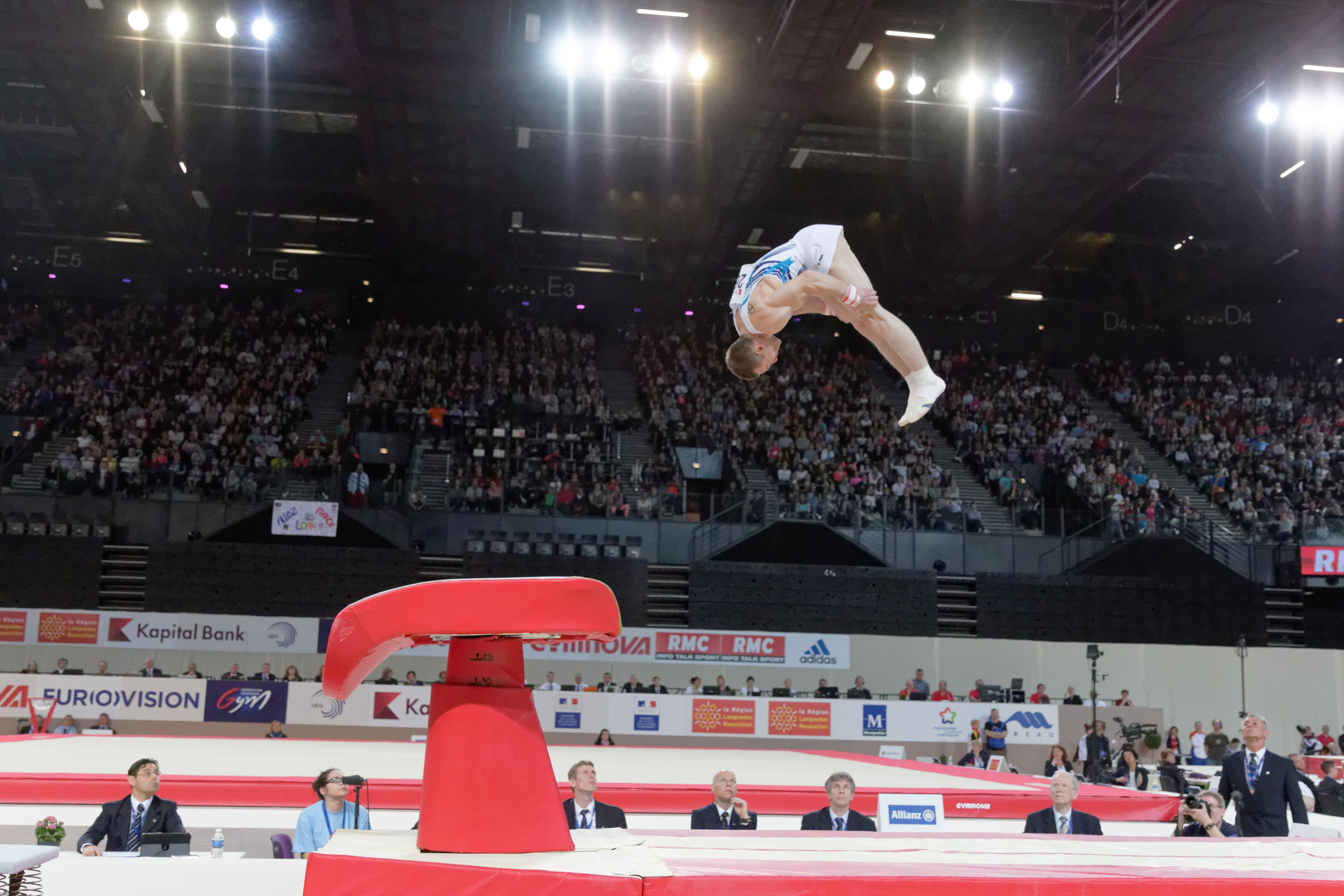
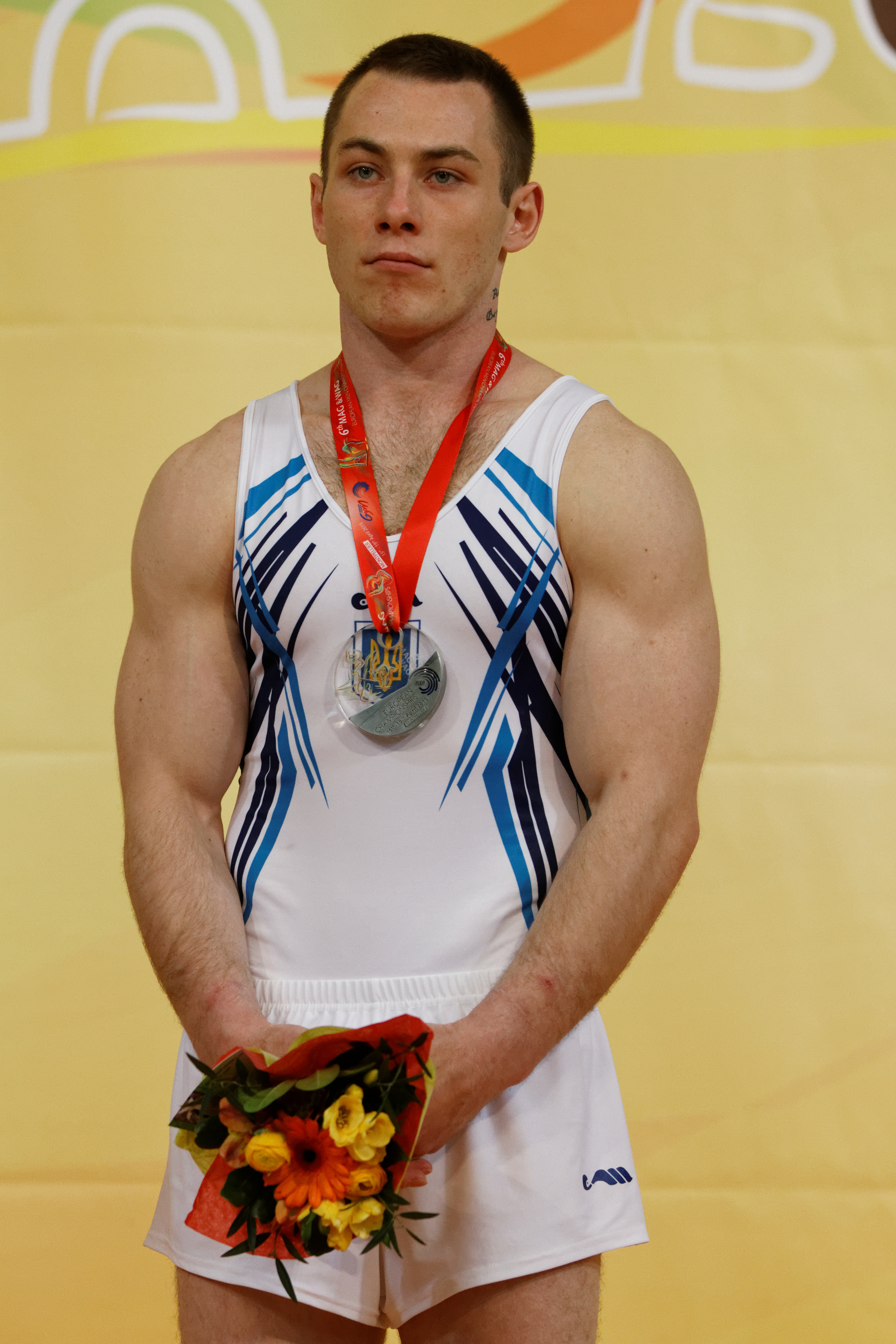
Radivilov at the 2015 European Championships

At the 2016 Summer Olympics in Rio de Janeiro, Radivilov debuted a new vault in the event final–a handspring triple front somersault–which had the highest difficulty score of 7.0. Although he sat it down on landing, his feet (not pelvis) did touch the ground first, and thus considered a successful attempt when a score was given, which also subsequently contributed to the International Gymnastics Federation (FIG) in formally naming the skill after him, the Radivilov. However, due to the potential danger of associated injuries to gymnasts with the training and/or competing of this skill, the FIG has since officially banned it from competition after the Olympics and removed it from the next 2017–2020 Code of Points for men's artistic gymnastics.

=== 2017–2019 ===
At the 2017 European Championships Radivilov won bronze on rings behind Eleftherios Petrounias and Courtney Tulloch. At the 2017 World Championships he won silver on vault behind Kenzō Shirai.

At the 2018 European Championships Radivilov won silver on vault behind Artur Davtyan. At the 2019 European Games he won bronze on both rings and vault. At the 2019 World Championships he won bronze on vault.

=== 2020–2021 ===
In March 2020 Radivilov competed at the Baku World Cup and qualified to the vault final in third place; however event finals were canceled due to the COVID-19 pandemic in Azerbaijan. The global COVID-19 pandemic caused numerous competitions to be cancelled or postponed, including the 2020 Olympic Games.

In October Radivilov returned to international competition at the Szombathely Challenge Cup where he finished second on rings and first on vault. In December 2020 he competed at an attendance-reduced European Championships where only ten nations sent a full team. The Ukrainian team of Radivilov, Vladyslav Hryko, Petro Pakhniuk, Roman Vashchenko, and Yevgen Yudenkov bested the Turkish team to win gold in the team competition. Individually Radivilov placed first on vault, winning his first European title on the event, and third on rings behind İbrahim Çolak and Vinzenz Höck.

Radivilov competed at the 2021 European Championships where he defended his title on vault; additionally he placed sixth on rings. He competed at the Doha World Cup and Osijek Challenge Cup where he placed second and first on vault respectively. He represented Ukraine at the 2020 Olympic Games in Tokyo, Japan alongside Illia Kovtun, Petro Pakhnyuk, and Yevhen Yudenkov. They finished seventh in the team final. Radivilov competed at the 2021 World Championships but did not qualify to any event finals.

=== 2022–2024 ===
Radivilov competed at the 2022 European Championships. On the first day of competition he helped Ukraine finish ninth as a team during qualifications. Although they didn't qualify for the team final they qualified a whole team to compete at the upcoming World Championships. Individually Radivilov qualified for the rings and vault finals. During the rings final Radivilov finished seventh. During the vault final Radivilov won bronze behind Jake Jarman and Artur Davtyan. In late October through early November Radivilov competed at the World Championships. While there he won bronze on vault behind Davtyan and Carlos Yulo.

At the 2023 European Championships Radivilov won bronze on vault, once again behind Davtyan and Jarman. In October Radivilov competed at the 2023 World Championships alongside Nazar Chepurnyi, Illia Kovtun, Radomyr Stelmakh, and Oleg Verniaiev. During qualifications they finished twelfth as a team and qualified a full team to the 2024 Olympic Games. Individually Radivilov qualified to the vault final. During the final Radivilov placed fourth behind Jarman, Khoi Young, and compatriot Chepurnyi.

In late April 2024 Radivilov competed at the European Championships alongside Nazar Chepurnyi, Illia Kovtun, Radomyr Stelmakh, and Oleg Verniaiev; together they qualified to the team final in first place and individually Radivilov qualified to the vault final. During event finals Radivilov placed fourth on vault. During the team final Radivilov contributed scores on rings and vault towards Ukraine's first-place finish. Radivilov competed at the 2024 Olympic Games alongside Chepurnyi, Kovtun, Stelmakh, and Verniaiev. During the qualification round he helped Ukraine qualify to the team final and individually he qualified to the vault final. During the team final Radivilov contributed scores on rings and vault towards Ukraine's fifth-place finish. In the vault final Radivilov fell on his first vault and finished the final in eighth place.

On December 1, 2024, Radivilov announced his retirement from gymnastics, ending his career with one Olympic medal, four World Championships medals, and fourteen European Championships medals.

== Eponymous skills ==
Radivilov has one "inactive" eponymous skill, but it is one that remains officially recognised by the (FIG) nonetheless. Even though he was ruled to have legally completed the skill in competition and subsequently given naming credit for it, his attempt at it during the 2016 Summer Olympics in Rio de Janeiro on the individual vault event did not go as smoothly as he would have liked. His attempt at the mindbogglingly difficult handspring triple front tucked somersault on vault—now officially known as the Radivilov—assigned the highest difficulty of 7.0, ended with him appearing to have landed the skill on his back, almost received a zero score if that was the case, but since video reply did show him (barely) touch the mat with his feet first, he had thus completed a legal vault and was therefore given a score, albeit with a very low execution component due to his fall. However, because Radivilov was then awarded a score to a new original skill, he was also simultaneously deemed to have successfully completed the skill in competition, which led to the skill being automatically named after him. Unfortunately, the skill has since been banned from competition entirely after the Olympics, and removed from the next Code of Points (CoP). The FIG has determined that the risk of injury when training and/or competing the skill is just too great for them not to intervene officially. The difficulty score listed below reflected the FIG's 2013-2016 CoP, which was when the skill was first successfully completed in competition, but then not updated into later quads due to its subsequent ban not long after the skill was originated.

Apparatus	Name	Description	Difficulty	Notes
Vault	Radivilov	front handspring–triple front tucked somersault	7.0	Originated at the 2016 Summer Olympics in Rio de Janeiro but banned almost immediately after the Olympics due to high risk of injury when performing or training the skill.

== Competitive history ==
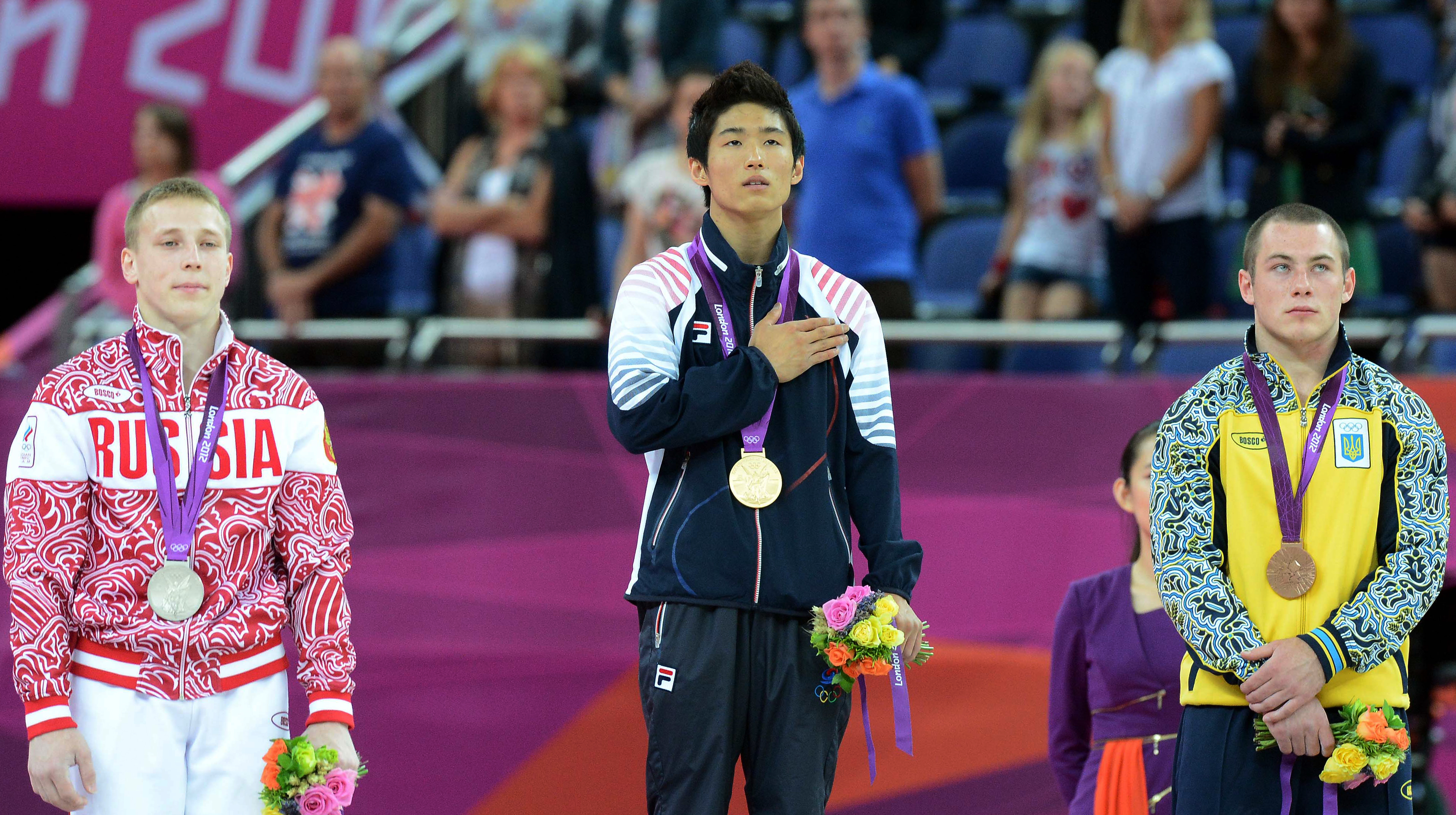
2012 Olympic podium

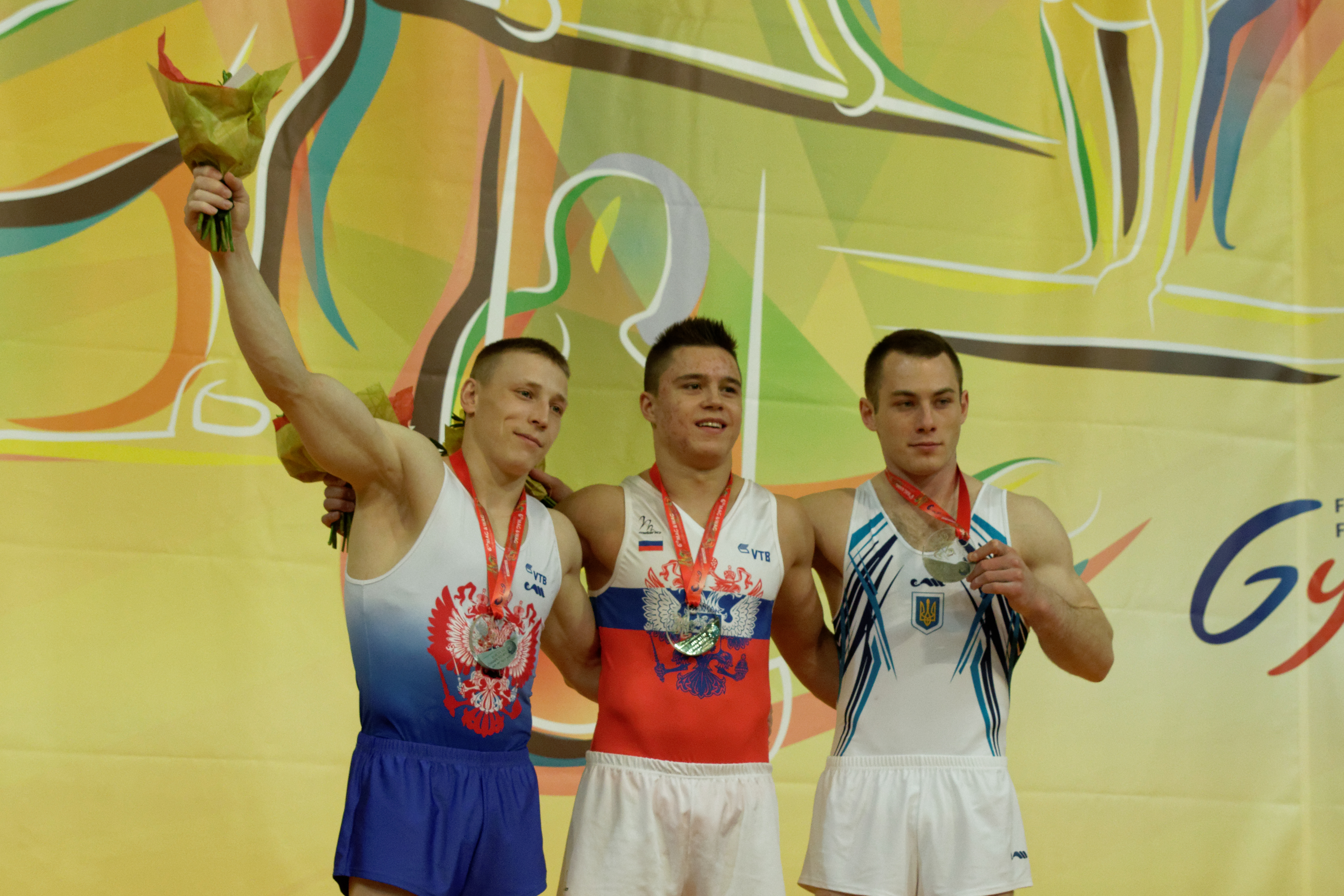
2015 European Championships podium

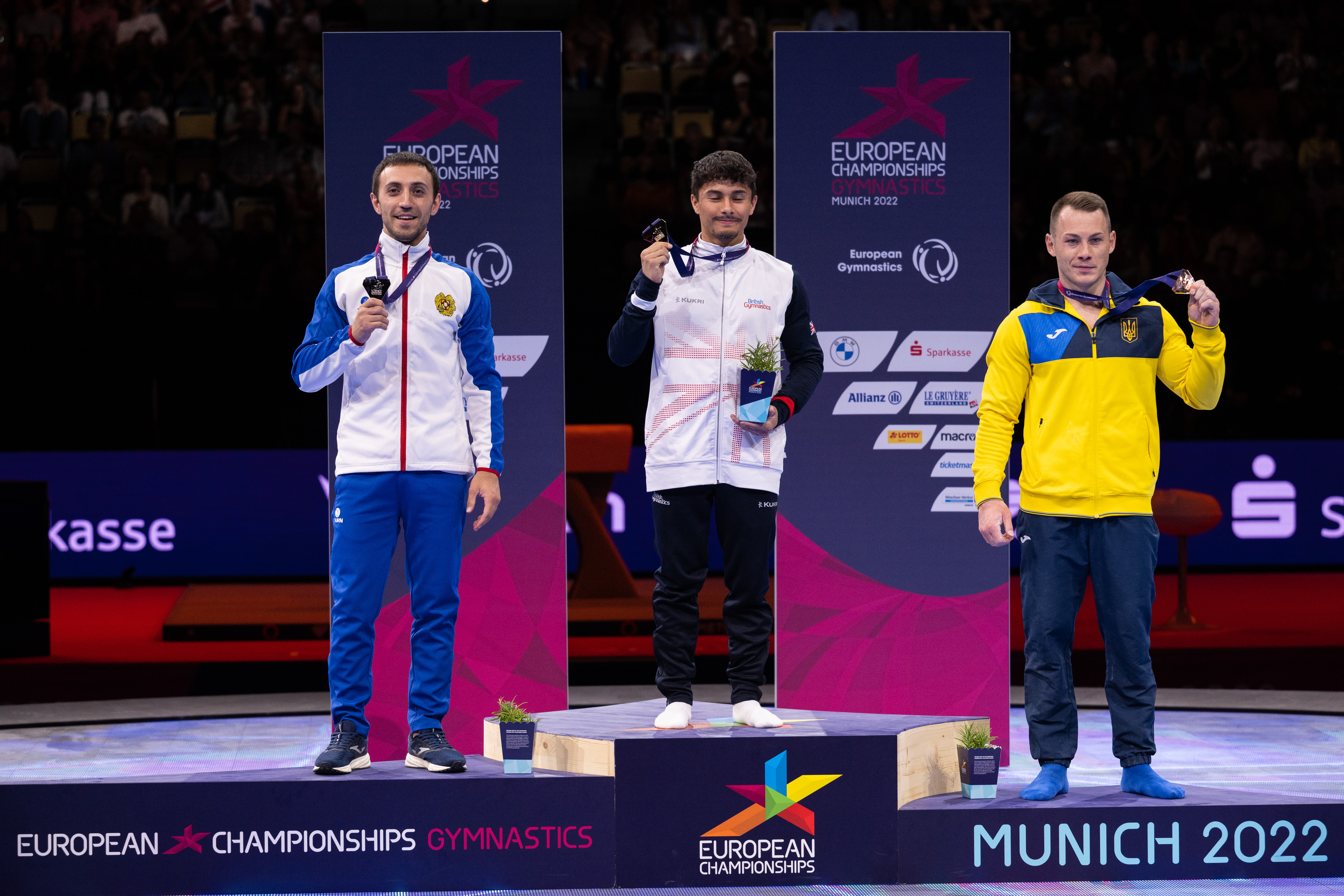
2022 European Championships podium

Competitive history of Igor Radivilov
Year	Event	Team	AA	FX	PH	SR	VT	PB	HB
2012	Cottbus World Cup						1st place, gold medalist(s)		
2012	Zibo World Cup						1st place, gold medalist(s)		
2012	European Championships	5					2nd place, silver medalist(s)		
2012	Olympic Games	4		8			3rd place, bronze medalist(s)		
2013
2013	European Championships					1st place, gold medalist(s)	5		
2013	Anadia Challenge Cup						2nd place, silver medalist(s)		
2013	Summer Universiade	2nd place, silver medalist(s)				3rd place, bronze medalist(s)	3rd place, bronze medalist(s)		
2014
2014	European Championships	3rd place, bronze medalist(s)				7	2nd place, silver medalist(s)		
2014	World Championships						2nd place, silver medalist(s)		
2015
2015	European Championships						2nd place, silver medalist(s)		
2015	European Games	2nd place, silver medalist(s)				6			
2015	Summer Universiade	3rd place, bronze medalist(s)				2nd place, silver medalist(s)	2nd place, silver medalist(s)		
2015	Osijek Challenge Cup					2nd place, silver medalist(s)	1st place, gold medalist(s)		
2015	World Championships						5		
2016	Cottbus Challenge Cup					1st place, gold medalist(s)			
2016	Olympic Test Event	2nd place, silver medalist(s)				4	3rd place, bronze medalist(s)		
2016	European Championships	4							
2016	Osijek Challenge Cup					3rd place, bronze medalist(s)	3rd place, bronze medalist(s)		
2016	Varna Challenge Cup					1st place, gold medalist(s)	1st place, gold medalist(s)		
2016	Olympic Games	8				5	8		
2016	Cottbus World Cup					1st place, gold medalist(s)	1st place, gold medalist(s)		
2017	Doha World Cup					2nd place, silver medalist(s)			
2017	European Championships					3rd place, bronze medalist(s)	7		
2017	Summer Universiade	2nd place, silver medalist(s)				6	6		
2017	Varna Challenge Cup					1st place, gold medalist(s)	1st place, gold medalist(s)		
2017	Paris Challenge Cup						2nd place, silver medalist(s)		
2017	World Championships					2nd place, silver medalist(s)	7		
2017	Cottbus World Cup					1st place, gold medalist(s)	2nd place, silver medalist(s)		
2018	Doha World Cup					1st place, gold medalist(s)	1st place, gold medalist(s)		
2018	European Championships					R2	2nd place, silver medalist(s)		
2018	World Championships	R1				8			
2018	Cottbus World Cup					4	1st place, gold medalist(s)		
2019	Melbourne World Cup					6	1st place, gold medalist(s)		
2019	Baku World Cup					3rd place, bronze medalist(s)	2nd place, silver medalist(s)		
2019	Doha World Cup						2nd place, silver medalist(s)		
2019	European Championships					8	7		
2019	European Games					3rd place, bronze medalist(s)	3rd place, bronze medalist(s)		
2019	Szombathely Challenge Cup					1st place, gold medalist(s)	5		
2019	World Championships	8				R1	3rd place, bronze medalist(s)		
2020	Baku World Cup						3rd place, bronze medalist(s)		
2020	Ukrainian Championships					1st place, gold medalist(s)	3rd place, bronze medalist(s)		
2020	Szombathely World Cup					2nd place, silver medalist(s)	1st place, gold medalist(s)		
2020	European Championships	1st place, gold medalist(s)				3rd place, bronze medalist(s)	1st place, gold medalist(s)		
2021	Ukrainian Championships					1st place, gold medalist(s)	1st place, gold medalist(s)		
2021	European Championships					6	1st place, gold medalist(s)		
2021	Doha World Cup					6	2nd place, silver medalist(s)		
2021	Osijek Challenge Cup					5	1st place, gold medalist(s)		
2021	Olympic Games	7				R3			
2022	Osijek Challenge Cup						1st place, gold medalist(s)		
2022	Koper Challenge Cup					1st place, gold medalist(s)	1st place, gold medalist(s)		
2022	European Championships	R1				7	3rd place, bronze medalist(s)		
2022	World Championships	21					3rd place, bronze medalist(s)		
2023
2023	European Championships	9					3rd place, bronze medalist(s)		
2023	Mersin Challenge Cup					3rd place, bronze medalist(s)	3rd place, bronze medalist(s)		
2023	World Championships	12					4		
2024	Baku World Cup					8			
2024	European Championships	1st place, gold medalist(s)					4		
2024	Olympic Games	5					8		
