= 2014 European Men's Artistic Gymnastics Championships =

31st European Men's Artistic Gymnastics Championships
- Venue: Arena Armeec
- Location: Sofia, Bulgaria
- Dates: 19 to 25 May 2014
- Nations: Members of the European Union of Gymnastics

The 31st European Men's Artistic Gymnastics Championships was held from 19 to 25 May 2014 at the Arena Armeec in Sofia, Bulgaria. They were held in conjunction with the 2014 European Women's Artistic Gymnastics Championships, which ended 18 May in the same arena. It was the fourth time the senior and junior women's and men's European championships had been held in one location, which posed logistical difficulties for the organizers; there were also issues with installing the podiums and apparatuses. For team events, five gymnasts were on each team; for seniors, three gymnasts competed on each apparatus, and all three scores counted toward the team total, while for juniors, four gymnasts could compete on each apparatus, with the top three scores counting.

327 gymnasts, 177 senior and 150 junior, from 39 countries competed at the event. The event functioned as a qualification for the 2014 Summer Youth Olympics and for the 2015 European Games.

The junior team from Great Britain won a fourth consecutive junior team gold despite two falls in the final apparatus rotation. In the individual all-around, Nile Wilson won gold by more than a point with the highest scores on the high bar and floor. He won a further three events in the apparatus finals, pommel horse, parallel bars, and high bar, for a total of five golds at the competition.

In the senior event, the Russian team won gold, with the British team in second and the Ukrainian team winning bronze. Denis Ablyazin from Russia won three further gold medals in the apparatus finals (floor, rings, and vault). Oleg Verniaiev won the parallel bars final, while Max Whitlock won the pommel horse final. In the high bar final, Epke Zonderland, the reigning Olympic and World champion on the event, won by more than a point.

== Schedule ==
The competition schedule is as follows (all times are local, EEST, UTC+03:00).

Wednesday, 21 May 2014

- 10:00–20:30 Junior team final and individual qualifying session

Thursday, 22 May 2014

- 10:00–20:15 Senior qualifying session

Friday, 23 May 2014

- 17:00–19:15 Junior all-around final

Saturday, 24 May 2014

- 14:30–17:00 Senior team final

Sunday, 25 May 2014

- 10:00–12:40 Junior individual event finals
- 15:00–18:55 Senior individual event finals

== Medalists ==
Event	Gold	Silver	Bronze
Seniors
Team	Russia; Denis Ablyazin; Nikolai Kuksenkov; Nikita Ignatyev; Aleksandr Balandin; David Belyavskiy	Great Britain; Daniel Purvis; Daniel Keatings; Sam Oldham; Kristian Thomas; Max Whitlock	Ukraine; Oleg Verniaiev; Ihor Radivilov; Maksym Semiankiv; Andrii Sienichkin; Volodymyr Okachev
Floor Exercise	Denis Ablyazin (RUS)	Eleftherios Kosmidis (GRE)	Daniel Purvis (GBR) Alexander Shatilov (ISR)
Pommel Horse	Max Whitlock (GBR)	Krisztián Berki (HUN)	Sašo Bertoncelj (SLO)
Still Rings	Denis Ablyazin (RUS); Aleksandr Balandin (RUS)	none awarded	Samir Aït Saïd (FRA)
Vault	Denis Ablyazin (RUS)	Igor Radivilov (UKR)	Oleg Verniaiev (UKR)
Parallel Bars	Oleg Verniaiev (UKR)	David Belyavskiy (RUS)	Epke Zonderland (NED)
Horizontal Bar	Epke Zonderland (NED)	Sam Oldham (GBR)	Kristian Thomas (GBR)
Juniors
Team	Great Britain; Brinn Bevan; Joe Fraser; Giarnni Regini-Moran; Gaius Thompson; Nile Wilson	Russia; Artur Dalaloyan; Sergei Eltcov; Nikita Nagornyy; Kirill Potapov; Valentin Starikov	France; Rémi Clerc; Paul Degouy; Zachari Hrimèche; Killian Mermet; Baptiste Miette
All-Around	Nile Wilson (GBR)	Valentin Starikov (RUS)	Brinn Bevan (GBR)
Floor Exercise	Giarnni Regini-Moran (GBR)	Gaius Thompson (GBR)	Sascha Alexander Coradi (SUI)
Pommel Horse	Nile Wilson (GBR)	Sergey Eltcov (RUS)	Simone Bresolin (ITA)
Still Rings	Vinzenz Hoeck (AUT)	Brinn Bevan (GBR)	Eyal Glazer (ISR)
Vault	Nikita Nagornyy (RUS)	Giarnni Regini-Moran (GBR)	Florian Landuyt (BEL); Zachari Hrimeche (FRA)
Parallel Bars	Nile Wilson (GBR)	Brinn Bevan (GBR)	Eduard Yermakov (UKR)
Horizontal Bar	Nile Wilson (GBR)	Zachari Hrimèche (FRA)	Sascha Alexander Coradi (SUI)

== Senior Results ==
The British team lead the Russian one by almost three points in the qualification round. The Dutch team advanced to the final round for the first time at the European championships. In the final, the Russian team pulled ahead of the British team by two points to win.

=== Team ===
Rank	Team	Floor (gymnastics)	Pommel horse	Rings (gymnastics)	Vault (gymnastics)	Parallel bars	Horizontal bar	Total
1st place, gold medalist(s)	Russia	46.299 (1)	42.499 (3)	46.199 (1)	44.198 (2)	44.698 (4)	44.066 (3)	267.959
1st place, gold medalist(s)	Denis Ablyazin	15.833		15.500	15.366			267.959
1st place, gold medalist(s)	Aleksandr Balandin			15.633				267.959
1st place, gold medalist(s)	David Belyavskiy	15.466	13.200		15.166	15.266	14.600	267.959
1st place, gold medalist(s)	Nikita Ignatyev	15.000	14.166		13.666	14.566	14.633	267.959
1st place, gold medalist(s)	Nikolai Kuksenkov		15.133	15.066		14.866	14.833	267.959
2nd place, silver medalist(s)	Great Britain	45.900 (2)	45.141 (1)	42.782 (7)	43.565 (5)	44.433 (6)	44.132 (2)	265.953
2nd place, silver medalist(s)	Daniel Keatings		15.008			15.200		265.953
2nd place, silver medalist(s)	Sam Oldham			14.783	14.966	14.500	15.000	265.953
2nd place, silver medalist(s)	Daniel Purvis	15.200	13.933	14.333	14.633			265.953
2nd place, silver medalist(s)	Kristian Thomas	15.000			13.966		14.866	265.953
2nd place, silver medalist(s)	Max Whitlock	15.700	16.200	13.666		14.733	14.266	265.953
3rd place, bronze medalist(s)	Ukraine	43.481 (4)	43.066 (2)	43.900 (4)	43.783 (4)	44.857 (2)	42.999 (5)	262.087
3rd place, bronze medalist(s)	Volodymyr Okachev					14.533	13.666	262.087
3rd place, bronze medalist(s)	Igor Radivilov	14.266		15.300	14.700			262.087
3rd place, bronze medalist(s)	Maksym Semiankiv	14.116	14.466	13.700		14.733	14.733	262.087
3rd place, bronze medalist(s)	Andrii Sienichkin		14.200		14.300			262.087
3rd place, bronze medalist(s)	Oleg Verniaiev	15.100	14.400	14.900	14.783	15.591	14.600	262.087
4	Germany	43.066 (5)	41.566 (5)	44.166 (3)	44.507 (1)	44.274 (7)	43.132 (4)	260.711
4	Andreas Bretschneider	13.700				15.066	14.533	260.711
4	Fabian Hambuechen	15.266	13.500	14.633	14.966		15.366	260.711
4	Sebastian Krimmer	14.100	14.433			14.100	13.233	260.711
4	Marcel Nguyen			15.000	14.800	15.108		260.711
4	Andreas Toba		13.633	14.533	14.741			260.711
5	France	43.532 (3)	41.665 (4)	44.432 (2)	42.132 (7)	45.199 (1)	41.932 (6)	258.892
5	Samir Aït Saïd	14.366		15.000	14.733			258.892
5	Kevin Antoniotti	14.700			14.233	15.066	12.866	258.892
5	Hamilton Sabot		12.466	14.366		15.433	14.800	258.892
5	Cyril Tommasone	14.466	14.133	14.466	13.166		14.466	258.892
5	Arnaud Willig	14.466	14.133	14.466	13.166		14.466	258.892
6	Netherlands	41.233 (8)	40.932 (7)	43.433 (5)	44.166 (3)	41.933 (8)	45.282 (1)	256.979
6	Bart Deurloo	14.400	14.100	14.100	14.733	14.100	14.891	256.979
6	Casimir Schmidt	14.100	13.566	13.900	14.800	12.533		256.979
6	Yuri Van Gelder				15.433			256.979
6	Jeffrey Wammes	12.733			14.633		14.758	256.979
6	Epke Zonderland		13.266			15.300	15.633	256.979
7	Romania	42.175 (6)	39.866 (8)	42.899 (6)	43.366 (6)	44.840 (3)	39.733 (8)	252.779
7	Ioan Cristian Bățagă	14.400	13.733	14.500	14.600		13.333	252.779
7	Marius Berbecar		12.000		13.766	15.666		252.779
7	Andrei Vasile Muntean	14.000		15.166	14.900	14.833	14.000	252.779
7	Ioan Laurentiu Nistor			13.233			12.400	252.779
7	A. A. Ursache	13.775	14.133			14.341		252.779
8	Belarus	42.133 (7)	41.333 (6)	41.900 (8)	40.933 (8)	44.599 (5)	41.774 (7)	252.672
8	Dzmitry Barkalau	14.400	14.000		14.400		14.075	252.672
8	Pavel Bulauski	13.833		13.600	13.500			252.672
8	Andrey Likhovitsky	13.900	14.333	14.100	13.033	14.800	14.666	252.672
8	Vasili Mikhalitsyn		13.000	14.200		14.566		252.672
8	Alexander Tsarevich					15.233	13.033	252.672

=== Floor Exercise ===
Position	Gymnast	D Score	E Score	Penalty	Total
1st place, gold medalist(s)	Denis Ablyazin (RUS)	7.1	8.600		15.700
2nd place, silver medalist(s)	Eleftherios Kosmidis (GRE)	6.6	8.933		15.533
3rd place, bronze medalist(s)	Daniel Purvis (GBR)	6.5	8.900		15.400
3rd place, bronze medalist(s)	Alexander Shatilov (ISR)	6.5	8.900		15.400
5	Max Whitlock (GBR)	6.7	8.733	-0.1	15.333
6	Dzmitry Barkalau (BLR)	6.4	8.841		15.241
7	Claudio Capelli (SUI)	6.4	8.500		14.900
8	David Belyavskiy (RUS)	6.5	8.366		14.866

=== Pommel Horse ===
Position	Gymnast	D Score	E Score	Penalty	Total
1st place, gold medalist(s)	Max Whitlock (GBR)	7.3	8.866		16.166
2nd place, silver medalist(s)	Krisztián Berki (HUN)	6.9	8.733		15.633
3rd place, bronze medalist(s)	Sašo Bertoncelj (SLO)	6.5	8.966		15.466
4	Nikolai Kuksenkov (RUS)	7.1	8.233		15.333
5	Oleg Verniaiev (UKR)	6.7	7.433		14.133
6	Andrey Likhovitskiy (BLR)	6.4	7.600		14.000
7	Filip Ude (CRO)	6.4	7.366		13.766
8	Vasili Mikhalitsyn (BLR)	6.1	7.166		13.266

=== Still Rings ===
Position	Gymnast	D Score	E Score	Penalty	Total
1st place, gold medalist(s)	Denis Ablyazin (RUS)	6.8	9.000		15.800
1st place, gold medalist(s)	Aleksandr Balandin (RUS)	6.9	8.900		15.800
3rd place, bronze medalist(s)	Samir Aït Saïd (FRA)	6.8	8.966		15.766
4	Artur Tovmasyan (ARM)	6.6	9.100		15.700
5	Vahagn Davtyan (ARM)	6.6	9.000		15.600
5	Eleftherios Petrounias (GRE)	6.8	8.800		15.600
7	Igor Radivilov (UKR)	6.7	8.333		15.033
8	Yuri Van Gelder (NED)	6.4	7.808		14.208

=== Vault ===
Rank	Gymnast	D Score	E Score	Pen.	Score 1	D Score	E Score	Pen.	Score 2	Total
1st place, gold medalist(s)	Denis Ablyazin (RUS)	6.0	9.200		15.200	6.2	8.900		15.100	15.150
2nd place, silver medalist(s)	Igor Radivilov (UKR)	6.0	9.000		15.000	6.0	9.100		15.100	15.050
3rd place, bronze medalist(s)	Oleg Verniaiev (UKR)	6.0	9.300		15.300	6.0	8.633	-0.1	14.533	14.916
4	Tomi Tuuha (FIN)	5.6	9.400		15.000	5.6	9.166	-0.1	14.666	14.833
4	Casimir Schmidt (NED)	5.6	9.400		15.000	5.6	9.166	-0.1	14.666	14.833
6	Andrey Medvedev (ISR)	5.6	9.333		14.933	6.0	8.633	-0.1	14.533	14.733
7	Michael Meier (SUI)	5.6	8.700	-0.3	14.000	5.2	9.266		14.466	14.233
8	Jeffrey Wammes (NED)	5.6	8.000		13.600	0.0	0.000		0.000	6.800
Rank	Gymnast	Vault 1				Vault 2				Total

=== Parallel Bars ===
Position	Gymnast	D Score	E Score	Penalty	Total
1st place, gold medalist(s)	Oleg Verniaiev (UKR)	6.8	9.166		15.966
2nd place, silver medalist(s)	David Belyavskiy (RUS)	6.6	8.966		15.566
3rd place, bronze medalist(s)	Epke Zonderland (NED)	6.5	9.033		15.533
4	Marius Berbecar (ROU)	6.5	8.466		14.966
5	Nikolai Kuksenkov (RUS)	5.8	8.400		14.200
6	Andrei Vasile Muntean (ROU)	6.2	7.966		14.166
7	Mitja Petkovšek (SLO)	4.6	7.966		12.566
8	Alexander Tsarevich (BLR)	4.8	7.300		12.100

=== Horizontal Bar ===
Position	Gymnast	D Score	E Score	Penalty	Total
1st place, gold medalist(s)	Epke Zonderland (NED)	7.3	8.566		15.866
2nd place, silver medalist(s)	Sam Oldham (GBR)	6.5	8.366		14.866
3rd place, bronze medalist(s)	Kristian Thomas (GBR)	6.5	8.308		14.808
4	Oliver Hegi (SUI)	6.2	8.600		14.800
5	Kristof Schroe (BEL)	6.3	8.466		14.766
6	Hamilton Sabot (FRA)	6.2	8.300		14.500
7	Maxim Semiankiv (UKR)	5.2	6.566		11.766
8	Fabian Hambuechen (GER)	2.4	8.725	-6.0	5.125

== Junior Results ==
=== Team ===
The junior team competition also served as the qualifying round for the all-around finals as well as the junior event finals. The format of the competition included four gymnasts per team competing on each event with the highest three scores counting towards the team total. The highest scoring all-around and event gymnasts advanced to finals.

Rank	Team	Floor (gymnastics)	Pommel horse	Rings (gymnastics)	Vault (gymnastics)	Parallel bars	Horizontal bar	Total
1st place, gold medalist(s)	Great Britain	42.832 (1)	39.866 (2)	42.366 (2)	44.033 (1)	43.732 (1)	41.265 (1)	254.094
1st place, gold medalist(s)	Brinn Bevan	13.858	13.333	14.200	14.366	14.533	13.566	254.094
1st place, gold medalist(s)	Joe Fraser		12.933	13.666		14.000		254.094
1st place, gold medalist(s)	Giarnni Regini-Moran	14.366			14.900	14.133	13.266	254.094
1st place, gold medalist(s)	Gaius Thompson	14.333	12.800	13.966	14.600		13.666	254.094
1st place, gold medalist(s)	Nile Wilson	14.133	13.600	14.200	14.533	15.066	14.033	254.094
2nd place, silver medalist(s)	Russia	42.266 (3)	40.866 (1)	42.566 (1)	43.633 (2)	42.965 (2)	40.099 (4)	252.395
2nd place, silver medalist(s)	Artur Dalaloyan	14.133		14.200	14.900		12.433	252.395
2nd place, silver medalist(s)	Sergei Eltcov		13.633			13.900		252.395
2nd place, silver medalist(s)	Nikita Nagornyy	13.866	13.366	14.200	14.433	13.966	13.433	252.395
2nd place, silver medalist(s)	Kirill Potapov	14.000	13.700	14.033	14.300	14.333	13.633	252.395
2nd place, silver medalist(s)	Valentin Starikov	14.133	13.533	14.166	14.200	14.666	13.033	252.395
3rd place, bronze medalist(s)	France	41.465 (5)	38.132 (6)	40.382 (7)	43.633 (2)	42.316 (3)	40.474 (2)	246.402
3rd place, bronze medalist(s)	Remi Clerc	13.766	11.200	13.733	14.400	14.000	13.200	246.402
3rd place, bronze medalist(s)	Paul Degouy	13.733	12.766	13.716	14.433	14.133	13.466	246.402
3rd place, bronze medalist(s)	Zachari Hrimeche	13.966	12.566	12.933	14.800	13.033	13.808	246.402
3rd place, bronze medalist(s)	Killian Mermet	13.400				14.183		246.402
3rd place, bronze medalist(s)	Baptiste Miette		12.800	12.866	14.100		12.933	246.402
4	Switzerland	42.699 (2)	37.999 (7)	41.165 (4)	42.633 (4)	41.366 (4)	40.332 (3)	246.194
4	Sascha Alexander Coradi	14.233	12.600	13.733	14.500	13.766	13.533	246.194
4	Andreas Gribi		12.933			13.800		246.194
4	Silas Kipfer	14.266		13.566	14.433		13.200	246.194
4	Adrian Nestor Pfiffner	13.566	12.333	13.866	13.700	13.733	13.533	246.194
4	Marco Pfyl	14.200	12.466	13.500	12.866	13.800	13.266	246.194
5	Italy	40.865 (11)	39.800 (3)	40.599 (5)	41.898 (9)	40.974 (9)	39.999 (5)	244.135
5	Nicola Bartolini	14.166	13.300	12.966	14.366	13.766	13.333	244.135
5	Simone Bresolin		13.600	12.200			13.266	244.135
5	Matteo Levantesi	13.533			13.766	13.608	13.400	244.135
5	Andrea Russo	12.733	12.700	13.933	13.433	13.366	13.033	244.135
5	Marco Sarrugerio	13.166	12.900	13.700	13.766	13.600		244.135
6	Israel	41.466 (4)	39.291 (4)	41.233 (3)	41.500 (10)	39.232 (15)	38.499 (13)	241.221
6	Artem Dolgopyat	14.033	10.800	12.666	13.600	13.166	12.500	241.221
6	Eyal Glazer	13.633	13.500	14.400	12.633	12.866	12.866	241.221
6	Yair Shechter	13.533		13.233	13.400	12.475	13.133	241.221
6	Michael Sorokine	13.800	12.358		14.500			241.221
6	Moran Yanuka		13.433	13.600		13.200	12.166	241.221
7	Belgium	41.233 (6)	37.498 (10)	39.999 (9)	42.632 (5)	40.399 (12)	39.424 (6)	241.185
7	Florian Landuyt	13.233	13.066	13.300	14.766	12.566	12.500	241.185
7	Bernard Pire	11.766	13.166		13.466	13.366		241.185
7	Iliaz Pyncket			11.533			13.366	241.185
7	Luka van den Keybus	13.600	11.266	13.033	13.500	13.733	12.958	241.185
7	Jonathan Vrolix	14.400	11.033	13.666	14.366	13.300	13.100	241.185
8	Hungary	40.933 (8)	37.432 (11)	39.333 (14)	42.298 (8)	40.991 (8)	39.241 (8)	240.228
8	Krisztian Boncser			11.933	14.166		13.425	240.228
8	Norbert Dudas	13.033	12.433	13.900	13.766	13.500	12.683	240.228
8	Mark Feher	13.500	11.100			13.633		240.228
8	Botond Kardos	13.900	12.866	13.500	14.366	13.858	13.133	240.228
8	Kornel Vida	13.533	12.133	11.866	12.500	13.283	11.433	240.228

=== Individual All-Around ===
Rank	Gymnast	Floor (gymnastics)	Pommel horse	Rings (gymnastics)	Vault (gymnastics)	Parallel bars	Horizontal bar	Total
1st place, gold medalist(s)	Nile Wilson (GBR)	14.666	13.766	14.016	14.266	13.666	14.266	84.646
2nd place, silver medalist(s)	Valentin Starikov (RUS)	14.283	13.533	13.700	14.733	14.200	13.091	83.540
3rd place, bronze medalist(s)	Brinn Bevan (GBR)	13.266	13.700	14.233	14.400	13.500	13.833	82.932
4	Sascha Alexander Coradi (SUI)	14.100	12.891	13.633	14.600	13.833	13.666	82.723
5	Florian Landuyt (BEL)	14.333	13.233	13.166	14.733	13.733	12.933	82.131
6	Vigen Khachatryan (ARM)	13.733	12.866	13.866	14.533	13.533	13.133	81.664
7	Paul Degouy (FRA)	13.633	12.933	13.725	14.400	13.050	13.833	81.574
8	Nicola Bartolini (ITA)	13.900	13.033	13.200	14.266	13.400	13.566	81.365
9	Jonathan Vrolix (BEL)	14.166	12.758	13.391	14.300	13.366	13.333	81.314
10	Marios Georgiou (CYP)	13.833	12.833	13.600	14.400	13.533	12.900	81.099
11	Zachari Hrimèche (FRA)	14.000	11.933	13.200	14.600	13.233	13.758	80.724
12	David Huddleston (BUL)	13.325	13.466	13.233	13.266	14.066	13.333	80.698
13	Tomas Kuzmickas (LTU)	14.066	12.833	12.466	14.066	13.700	13.166	80.297
14	Botond Kardos (HUN)	13.933	12.466	13.266	14.166	13.400	13.033	80.264
15	Kirill Potapov (RUS)	13.693	13.383	14.100	14.366	12.741	11.166	79.739
16	Adrian Nestor Pfiffner (SUI)	13.400	12.500	13.566	13.366	13.400	13.500	79.732
17	Andrea Russo (ITA)	13.183	13.066	13.633	13.366	13.000	13.266	79.514
18	Frank Rijken (NED)	12.800	13.300	13.500	12.900	13.633	13.233	79.366
19	Antonios Tantalidis (GRE)	14.108	13.691	12.833	14.233	12.933	11.433	79.231
20	Vladyslav Hryko (UKR)	13.600	13.566	12.333	13.966	13.233	12.433	79.131
21	Nils Dunkel (GER)	13.083	12.333	13.166	13.933	13.333	12.966	78.814
22	Eyal Glazer (ISR)	12.166	13.333	14.075	12.733	12.933	13.100	78.340
23	Norbert Dudas (HUN)	12.633	11.500	13.633	13.400	13.066	12.166	76.398
24	Ahmet Önder (TUR)	14.000	10.200	13.366	13.958	11.566	12.500	75.590

=== Floor Exercise ===
Position	Gymnast	D Score	E Score	Penalty	Total
1st place, gold medalist(s)	Giarnni Regini-Moran (GBR)	5.8	8.900		14.700
2nd place, silver medalist(s)	Gaius Thompson (GBR)	5.4	9.100		14.500
3rd place, bronze medalist(s)	Sascha Alexander Coradi (SUI)	5.3	9.166		14.466
4	Jonathan Vrolix (BEL)	5.4	8.908		14.308
5	Valentin Starikov (RUS)	5.4	8.833		14.233
6	Silas Kipfer (SUI)	5.2	9.033		14.233
7	Rick Jacobs (NED)	5.6	8.100	-0.3	13.400
8	Nicola Bartolini (ITA)	5.2	7.966		13.166

=== Pommel Horse ===
Position	Gymnast	D Score	E Score	Penalty	Total
1st place, gold medalist(s)	Nile Wilson (GBR)	5.5	8.700		14.200
2nd place, silver medalist(s)	Sergei Eltcov (RUS)	5.2	8.825		14.025
3rd place, bronze medalist(s)	Simone Bresolin (ITA)	4.9	9.016		13.916
4	Nils Dunkel (GER)	5.3	8.533		13.833
5	David Huddleston (BUL)	4.6	9.183		13.783
6	Kirill Potapov (RUS)	5.2	8.533		13.733
7	Eyal Glazer (ISR)	5.0	8.700		13.700
8	Vladyslav Hryko (UKR)	5.3	7.333		12.633

=== Still Rings ===
Position	Gymnast	D Score	E Score	Penalty	Total
1st place, gold medalist(s)	Vinczenz Hoeck (AUT)	5.5	8.933		14.433
2nd place, silver medalist(s)	Brinn Bevan (GBR)	5.0	9.100		14.100
3rd place, bronze medalist(s)	Eyal Glazer (ISR)	5.3	8.666		13.966
4	Artur Dalaloyan (RUS)	5.1	8.800		13.900
5	Marios Georgiou (CYP)	4.8	8.916		13.716
6	Vigen Khachatryan (ARM)	4.8	8.800		13.600
7	Nile Wilson (GBR)	5.2	8.233		13.433
8	Andrea Russo (ITA)	4.8	8.233		13.033
9	Nikita Nagornyy (RUS)	5.0	7.633		12.633

=== Vault ===
Rank	Gymnast	D Score	E Score	Pen.	Score 1	D Score	E Score	Pen.	Score 2	Total
1st place, gold medalist(s)	Nikita Nagornyy (RUS)	5.6	9.300		14.900	5.6	9.366		14.966	14.933
2nd place, silver medalist(s)	Giarnni Regini-Moran (GBR)	5.6	9.266		14.866	5.2	9.400		14.600	14.733
3rd place, bronze medalist(s)	Florian Landuyt (BEL)	5.6	9.033		14.633	5.2	9.100		14.300	14.466
3rd place, bronze medalist(s)	Zachari Hrimeche (FRA)	5.6	9.200		14.800	5.2	8.933		14.133	14.466
5	Nicola Bartolini (ITA)	5.6	8.100	-0.1	13.600	5.2	9.100		14.300	13.950
6	Gaius Thompson (GBR)	5.6	8.033	-0.3	13.333	5.2	9.166		14.366	13.849
7	Artur Dalaloyan (RUS)	5.6	7.966		13.566	5.2	8.966	-0.1	14.066	13.816
8	Vigen Khachatryan (ARM)	5.2	9.400		14.600	5.2	7.866	-0.1	12.966	13.763
Rank	Gymnast	Vault 1				Vault 2				Total

=== Parallel Bars ===
Position	Gymnast	D Score	E Score	Penalty	Total
1st place, gold medalist(s)	Nile Wilson (GBR)	5.8	9.000		14.800
2nd place, silver medalist(s)	Brinn Bevan (GBR)	5.4	9.333		14.733
3rd place, bronze medalist(s)	Eduard Yermakov (UKR)	5.6	8.566		14.166
4	Kirill Potapov (RUS)	5.7	8.400		14.100
5	David Huddleston (BUL)	4.7	8.533		13.233
6	Ahmet Onder (TUR)	5.3	7.900		13.200
7	Valentin Starikov (RUS)	5.1	8.075		13.175
8	Frank Rijken (NED)	5.2	7.166		12.366

=== Horizontal Bar ===
Position	Gymnast	D Score	E Score	Penalty	Total
1st place, gold medalist(s)	Nile Wilson (GBR)	5.4	8.766		14.166
2nd place, silver medalist(s)	Zachari Hrimeche (FRA)	5.2	8.633		13.833
3rd place, bronze medalist(s)	Sascha Alexander Coradi (SUI)	5.1	8.566		13.666
4	Tin Srbić (CRO)	4.9	8.700		13.600
5	Ahmet Onder (TUR)	5.2	8.133		13.333
6	Adrian Nestor Pfiffner (SUI)	4.9	8.400		13.300
7	Gaius Thompson (GBR)	4.8	7.666		12.466
8	Kirill Potapov (RUS)	4.8	6.033		10.833

== Qualification ==
=== Seniors ===
==== Team competition ====
Rank	Team	Floor (gymnastics)	Pommel horse	Rings (gymnastics)	Vault (gymnastics)	Parallel bars	Horizontal bar	Total
1	Great Britain	45.866 (1)	44.965 (1)	43.799 (4)	43.149 (9)	44.865 (5)	44.432 (1)	267.076
1	Daniel Keatings		14.633			15.266		267.076
1	Sam Oldham			14.566	14.583	14.966	15.000	267.076
1	Daniel Purvis	15.266	14.366	14.633	13.366			267.076
1	Kristian Thomas	15.000			15.200		14.891	267.076
1	Max Whitlock	15.600	15.966	14.600		14.633	14.541	267.076
2	Russia	43.166 (8)	42.208 (5)	46.399 (1)	44.566 (1)	45.591 (3)	42.374 (6)	264.304
2	Denis Ablyazin	15.033		15.766	15.100			264.304
2	Aleksandr Balandin			15.633				264.304
2	David Belyavskiy	15.200	12.500		14.566	15.366	14.608	264.304
2	Nikita Ignatyev	12.933	14.408		14.900	14.900	13.166	264.304
2	Nikolai Kuksenkov		15.300	15.000		15.325	14.600	264.304
3	Ukraine	41.732 (14)	44.516 (2)	44.140 (3)	44.358 (3)	45.632 (2)	40.899 (11)	261.277
3	Volodymyr Okachev					14.966	13.133	261.277
3	Igor Radivilov	13.766		15.466	15.100			261.277
3	Maksym Semiankiv	13.766	14.500	13.733		14.766	14.733	261.277
3	Andrii Sienichkin		14.800		13.958			261.277
3	Oleg Verniaiev	14.200	15.216	14.941	15.300	15.900	13.033	261.277
4	Belarus	43.366 (4)	43.799 (3)	42.032 (10)	43.299 (7)	43.766 (9)	43.899 (3)	260.161
4	Dzmitry Barkalau	14.966	13.433		14.333		14.500	260.161
4	Pavel Bulauski	14.000		14.466	14.800	14.866	14.733	260.161
4	Andrey Likhovitskiy	14.400	15.200	13.633	14.066	14.866	14.733	260.161
4	Vasili Mikhalitsyn		15.166	13.933		13.300		260.161
4	Aliaksandr Tsarevich					15.600	14.666	260.161
5	France	43.065 (9)	42.358 (4)	43.566 (5)	43.333 (5)	44.333 (6)	43.124 (6)	259.779
5	Samir Aït Saïd	14.466		15.400	14.700			259.779
5	Kevin Antoniotti	14.266			13.900	13.933		259.779
5	Hamilton Sabot		14.233	14.133		15.300	14.891	259.779
5	Cyril Tommasone		14.025			15.100	13.900	259.779
5	Arnaud Willig	14.333	14.100	14.033	14.733		14.333	259.779
6	Netherlands	44.066 (2)	39.732 (13)	43.399 (6)	43.333 (5)	43.999 (7)	44.132 (2)	258.661
6	Bart Deurloo	14.600	14.066	14.333	13.733	14.433	13.933	258.661
6	Casimir Schmidt	14.533	13.300	13.566	14.900	13.966		258.661
6	Yuri van Gelder			15.500				258.661
6	Jeffrey Wammes	14.933			14.700		14.333	258.661
6	Epke Zonderland		12.366			15.600	15.866	258.661
7	Germany	41.166 (17)	40.466 (9)	43.108 (7)	42.990 (10)	43.832 (8)	43.065 (5)	254.627
7	Andreas Bretschneider	13.400				13.666		254.627
7	Fabian Hambuechen	14.833	13.533	14.500	15.091		15.133	254.627
7	Sebastian Krimmer	12.933	14.033			15.033		254.627
7	Marcel Nguyen			15.008	13.566	15.133	14.166	254.627
7	Andreas Toba		12.900	13.600	14.333		13.766	254.627
8	Romania	42.100 (12)	40.932 (8)	42.599 (8)	42.666 (11)	45.658 (1)	40.099 (16)	254.054
8	Cristian Ioan Bataga	14.100	13.266	14.200	14.700		13.100	254.054
8	Marius Daniel Berbecar		13.266		14.333	15.658		254.054
8	Andrei Vasile Muntean	14.100		15.033	13.633	15.500	13.833	254.054
8	Ioan Laurentiu Nistor			13.366			13.166	254.054
8	A. A. Ursache	13.900	14.400			14.500		254.054

==== Floor Exercise ====
Position	Gymnast	D Score	E Score	Penalty	Total
1	Max Whitlock (GBR)	6.7	8.900		15.600
1	Daniel Purvis (GBR)	6.5	8.766		15.266
3	Alexander Shatilov (ISR)	6.5	8.733		15.233
4	David Belyavskiy (RUS)	6.5	8.700		15.200
4	Eleftherios Kosmidis (GRE)	6.6	8.6		15.200
6	Denis Ablyazin (RUS)	7.1	8.033	-0.1	15.033
7	Claudio Capelli (SUI)	6.4	8.600		15.000
8	Dzmitry Barkalau (BLR)	6.4	8.566		14.966

==== Pommel Horse ====
Position	Gymnast	D Score	E Score	Penalty	Total
1	Max Whitlock (GBR)	7.4	8.566		15.966
2	Filip Ude (CRO)	6.7	8.966		15.666
3	Krisztián Berki (HUN)	6.7	8.800		15.500
4	Sašo Bertoncelj (SLO)	6.5	8.866		15.366
5	Nikolai Kuksenkov (RUS)	6.6	8.700		15.300
6	Oleg Verniaiev (UKR)	6.6	8.616		15.216
7	Andrey Likhovitskiy (BLR)	6.5	8.700		15.200
8	Vasili Mikhalitsyn (BLR)	6.4	8.766		15.166

==== Still Rings ====
Position	Gymnast	D Score	E Score	Penalty	Total
1	Denis Ablyazin (RUS)	6.8	8.966		15.766
2	Aleksandr Balandin (RUS)	6.9	8.733		15.633
3	Artur Tovmasyan (ARM)	6.6	9.000		15.600
4	Eleftherios Petrounias (GRE)	6.7	8.866		15.566
5	Yuri van Gelder (NED)	6.4	9.100		15.500
5	Davtyan Vahagn (ARM)	6.6	8.900		15.500
7	Igor Radivilov (UKR)	6.7	8.766		15.466
8	Samir Aït Saïd (FRA)	6.8	8.600		15.400

==== Vault ====
Rank	Gymnast	D Score	E Score	Pen.	Score 1	D Score	E Score	Pen.	Score 2	Total
1	Denis Ablyazin (RUS)	6.0	9.100		15.100	6.3	9.166		15.366	15.233
2	Igor Radivilov (UKR)	6.0	9.100		15.100	6.0	9.133		15.133	15.116
3	Oleg Verniaiev (UKR)	6.0	9.300		15.300	5.6	9.066		14.666	14.983
4	Casimir Schmidt (NED)	5.6	9.300		14.900	5.6	8.966		14.566	14.733
5	Andrey Medvedev (ISR)	5.6	9.100		14.700	6.0	8.691		14.691	14.695
6	Tomi Tuuha (FIN)	5.6	9.300		14.900	5.6	8.700		14.300	14.600
7	Michael Meier (SUI)	5.6	9.200		14.800	5.2	9.100		14.300	14.550
7	Jeffrey Wammes (NED)	5.6	9.100		14.700	5.8	8.700	-0.1	14.400	14.550
Rank	Gymnast	Vault 1				Vault 2				Total

==== Parallel Bars ====
Position	Gymnast	D Score	E Score	Penalty	Total
1	Oleg Verniaiev (UKR)	6.8	9.100		15.900
2	Marius Daniel Berbecar (ROU)	6.7	8.958		15.658
3	Mitja Petkovšek (SLO)	6.5	9.133		15.633
4	Epke Zonderland (NED)	6.5	9.100		15.600
4	Alexander Tsarevich (BLR)	6.6	9.000		15.600
6	Andrei Vasile Muntean (ROU)	6.6	8.900		15.500
7	David Belyavskiy (RUS)	6.6	8.766		15.366
8	Nikolai Kuksenkov (RUS)	6.5	8.825		15.325

==== Horizontal Bar ====
Position	Gymnast	D Score	E Score	Penalty	Total
1	Epke Zonderland (NED)	7.3	8.566		15.866
2	Fabian Hambuechen (GER)	6.6	8.533		15.133
3	Oliver Hegi (SUI)	6.2	8.833		15.033
4	Kristof Schroe (BEL)	6.5	8.500		15.000
4	Sam Oldham (GBR)	6.5	8.500		15.000
6	Hamilton Sabot (FRA)	6.2	8.691		14.891
6	Kristian Thomas (GBR)	6.3	8.591		14.891
8	Maksym Semiankiv (UKR)	6.2	8.533		14.733

=== Juniors ===
==== Individual All-Around ====
Rank	Gymnast	Floor (gymnastics)	Pommel horse	Rings (gymnastics)	Vault (gymnastics)	Parallel bars	Horizontal bar	Total
1	Nile Wilson (GBR)	14.133	13.600	14.200	14.533	15.066	14.033	85.565
2	Kirill Potapov (RUS)	14.000	13.700	14.033	14.300	14.333	13.633	83.999
3	Brinn Bevan (GBR)	13.858	13.333	14.200	14.366	14.533	13.566	83.856
4	Valentin Starikiv (RUS)	14.133	13.533	14.166	14.200	14.666	13.033	83.731
5	Alexander Sascha Coradi (SUI)	14.233	12.600	13.733	14.500	13.766	13.533	82.365
6	Paul Degouy (FRA)	13.733	12.766	13.716	14.433	14.133	13.466	82.247
7	Marios Georgiou (CYP)	13.533	13.366	13.900	14.433	13.683	13.166	82.081
8	Nicola Bartolini (ITA)	14.166	13.300	12.966	14.366	13.766	13.333	81.897
9	Botond Kardos (HUN)	13.900	12.866	13.500	14.366	13.858	13.133	81.632
10	Vigen Khachatryan (ARM)	13.958	12.633	13.900	14.566	13.566	12.733	81.356
11	Zachari Hrimeche (FRA)	13.966	12.566	12.933	14.800	13.033	13.808	81.106
12	David Huddleston (BUL)	13.333	13.600	13.433	13.300	14.200	13.000	80.866
13	Adrian Nestor Pfiffner (SUI)	13.566	12.333	13.866	13.700	13.733	13.533	80.731
14	Ahmet Önder (TUR)	14.100	11.266	13.366	14.000	14.300	13.566	80.598
15	Frank Rijken (NED)	13.100	13.116	13.500	13.266	14.200	13.200	80.382
16	Vladyslav Hryko (UKR)	13.641	13.491	12.966	13.333	14.000	12.600	80.031
17	Eyal Glazer (ISR)	13.633	13.500	14.400	12.633	12.866	12.866	79.898
18	Jonathan Vrolix (BEL)	14.400	11.033	13.666	14.366	13.300	13.100	79.865
19	Florian Landuyt (BEL)	13.233	13.066	13.300	14.766	12.566	12.500	79.431
20	Nils Dunkel (GER)	13.333	13.600	12.266	14.066	13.650	12.400	79.315
21	Norbert Dudas (HUN)	13.033	12.433	13.900	13.766	13.500	12.683	79.315
22	Andrea Russo (ITA)	12.733	12.700	13.933	13.433	13.366	13.033	79.198
23	Tomas Kuzmickas (LTU)	13.233	10.900	13.366	14.366	14.166	13.133	79.164
24	Antonios Tantalidis (GRE)	13.666	13.200	13.300	12.900	12.933	13.100	79.099

==== Floor Exercise ====
Position	Gymnast	D Score	E Score	Penalty	Total
1	Jonathan Vrolix (BEL)	5.4	9.000		14.400
1	Rick Jacobs (NED)	5.4	9.000		14.400
3	Giarnni Regini-Moran (GBR)	5.8	8.566		14.366
4	Gaius Thompson (GBR)	5.4	8.933		14.333
5	Silas Kipfer (SUI)	5.0	9.266		14.266
6	Sascha Alexander Coradi (SUI)	5.3	8.933		14.233
7	Nicola Bartolini (ITA)	5.2	8.966		14.166
8	Valentin Starikov (RUS)	5.5	8.633		14.133

==== Pommel Horse ====
Position	Gymnast	D Score	E Score	Penalty	Total
1	Kirill Potapov (RUS)	5.2	8.500		13.700
2	Sergei Eltcov (RUS)	5.5	8.133		13.633
3	David Huddleston (BUL)	4.6	9.000		13.600
3	Simone Bresolin (ITA)	4.9	8.700		13.600
3	Nils Dunkel (GER)	5.3	8.300		13.600
3	Nile Wilson (GBR)	5.5	8.100		13.600
7	Eyal Glazer (ISR)	4.9	8.600		13.500
8	Vladyslav Gryko (UKR)	5.6	7.891		13.491

==== Still Rings ====
Position	Gymnast	D Score	E Score	Penalty	Total
1	Eyal Glazer (ISR)	5.3	9.100		14.400
2	Vinzena Hoeck (AUT)	5.5	8.808		14.308
3	Brinn Bevan (GBR)	5.0	9.200		14.200
3	Nile Wilson (GBR)	5.1	9.100		14.200
3	Artur Dalaloyan (RUS)	5.1	9.100		14.200
3	Nikita Nagornyy (RUS)	5.2	9.000		14.200
7	Andrea Russo (ITA)	5.0	8.933		13.933
8	Vigen Khachatryan (ARM)	4.8	9.100		13.900
8	Marios Georgiou (CYP)	4.8	9.100		13.900

==== Vault ====
Rank	Gymnast	D Score	E Score	Pen.	Score 1	D Score	E Score	Pen.	Score 2	Total
1	Giarnni Regini-Moran (GBR)	5.6	9.300		14.900	5.2	9.433		14.633	14.766
2	Artur Dalaloyan (RUS)	5.6	9.300		14.900	5.2	9.266		14.466	14.683
3	Zachari Hrimeche (FRA)	5.6	9.200		14.800	5.2	9.066		14.266	14.533
3	Vigen Khachatryan (ARM)	5.2	9.366		14.566	5.2	9.300		15.500	14.533
5	Floria Landuyt (BEL)	5.6	9.166		14.766	5.2	9.066		14.266	14.516
5	Nikita Nagornyy (RUS)	5.6	8.833		14.433	5.6	9.000		14.600	14.516
7	Nicola Bartolini (ITA)	5.6	9.066	-0.3	14.366	5.2	9.400		14.600	14.483
7	Gaius Thompson (GBR)	5.6	9.100	-0.1	14.600	5.2	9.166		14.366	14.483
Rank	Gymnast	Vault 1				Vault 2				Total

==== Parallel Bars ====
Position	Gymnast	D Score	E Score	Penalty	Total
1	Nile Wilson (GBR)	6.0	9.066		15.066
2	Valentin Starikov (RUS)	5.7	8.966		14.666
3	Brinn Bevan (GBR)	5.4	9.133		14.533
4	Kirill Potapov (RUS)	5.7	8.633		14.333
5	Ahmet Onder (TUR)	5.4	8.900		14.300
5	Eduard Yermakov (UKR)	5.6	8.700		14.300
7	David Huddleston (BUL)	5.0	9.200		14.200
7	Frank Rijken (NED)	5.1	9.100		14.200

==== Horizontal Bar ====
Position	Gymnast	D Score	E Score	Penalty	Total
1	Nile Wilson (GBR)	5.4	8.633		14.033
2	Tin Srbić (CRO)	4.9	8.966		13.866
3	Zachari Hrimeche (FRA)	5.2	8.608		13.808
4	Gaius Thompson (GBR)	5.0	8.666		13.666
5	Kirill Potapov (RUS)	5.6	8.033		13.633
6	Ahmet Onder (TUR)	5.2	8.366		13.566
7	Adrian Nestor Pfiffner (SUI)	4.9	8.633		13.533
7	Sascha Alexander Coradi (SUI)	5.1	8.433		13.533

== Medal count ==
=== Combined ===
Rank	Nation	Gold	Silver	Bronze	Total
1	Great Britain	7	6	3	16
2	Russia	6	4	0	10
3	Ukraine	1	1	3	5
4	Netherlands	1	0	1	2
5	Austria	1	0	0	1
6	France	0	1	3	4
7	Greece	0	1	0	1
7	Hungary	0	1	0	1
9	Israel	0	0	2	2
9	Switzerland	0	0	2	2
11	Belgium	0	0	1	1
11	Italy	0	0	1	1
11	Slovenia	0	0	1	1
Totals (13 entries)		16	14	17	47

=== Seniors ===
Rank	Nation	Gold	Silver	Bronze	Total
1	Russia	5	1	0	6
2	Great Britain	1	2	2	5
3	Ukraine	1	1	2	4
4	Netherlands	1	0	1	2
5	Greece	0	1	0	1
5	Hungary	0	1	0	1
7	France	0	0	1	1
7	Israel	0	0	1	1
7	Slovenia	0	0	1	1
Totals (9 entries)		8	6	8	22

=== Juniors ===
Rank	Nation	Gold	Silver	Bronze	Total
1	Great Britain	6	4	1	11
2	Russia	1	3	0	4
3	Austria	1	0	0	1
4	France	0	1	2	3
5	Switzerland	0	0	2	2
6	Belgium	0	0	1	1
6	Israel	0	0	1	1
6	Italy	0	0	1	1
6	Ukraine	0	0	1	1
Totals (9 entries)		8	8	9	25
