= Oleg Verniaiev =

Ukrainian artistic gymnast (born 1993)

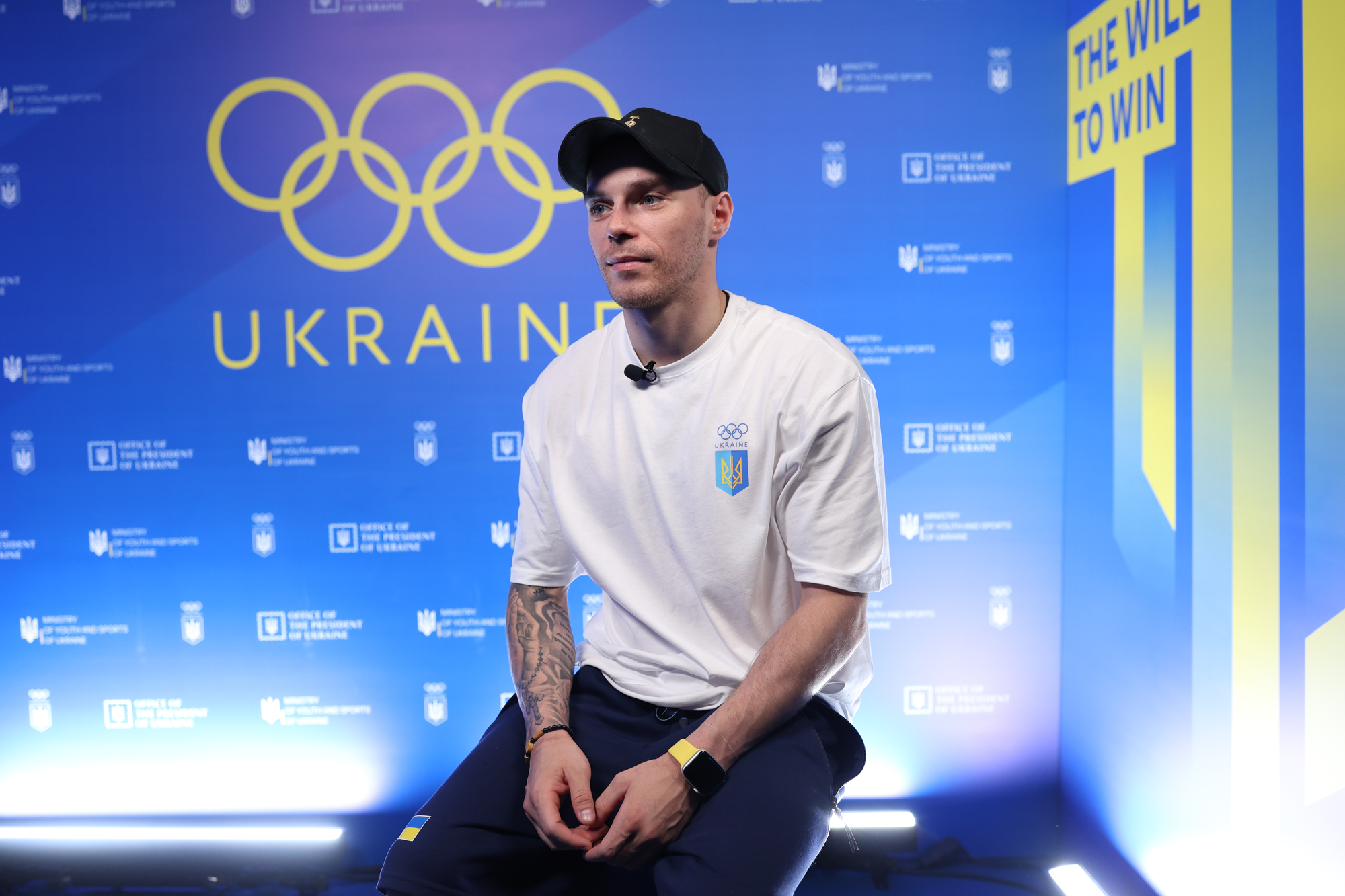
- Verniaiev in 2024

Personal information
- Full name: Oleg Yuriyovych Verniaiev
- Alternative name: Oleg/Oleh Vernyayev
- Born: 29 September 1993 (age 33) Donetsk, Ukraine
- Height: 160 cm (5 ft 3 in)

Gymnastics career
- Discipline: Men's artistic gymnastics
- Country represented: Ukraine; (2011–20, 2023–present)
- Club: Armed Forces of Ukraine
- Head coach: Gennady Sartynsky
Medal record
Event	1st	2nd	3rd
Olympic Games	1	1	0
World Championships	1	3	1
European Championships	7	3	4
European Games	2	2	0
Summer Universiade	3	5	6
Total	14	14	11
Representing Ukraine
Men's artistic gymnastics
Olympic Games
Gold medal – first place	2016 Rio de Janeiro	Parallel Bars
Silver medal – second place	2016 Rio de Janeiro	All-Around
World Championships
Gold medal – first place	2014 Nanning	Parallel Bars
Silver medal – second place	2015 Glasgow	Parallel Bars
Silver medal – second place	2017 Montreal	Parallel Bars
Silver medal – second place	2018 Doha	Parallel Bars
Bronze medal – third place	2019 Stuttgart	All-Around
European Games
Gold medal – first place	2015 Baku	All-Around
Gold medal – first place	2015 Baku	Vault
Gold medal – first place	2019 Minsk	Parallel Bars
Silver medal – second place	2015 Baku	Team
Silver medal – second place	2019 Minsk	All-Around
Silver medal – second place	2019 Minsk	Pommel Horse
European Championships
Gold medal – first place	2014 Sofia	Parallel Bars
Gold medal – first place	2015 Montpellier	All-Around
Gold medal – first place	2015 Montpellier	Parallel Bars
Gold medal – first place	2016 Bern	Vault
Gold medal – first place	2017 Cluj-Napoca	All-Around
Gold medal – first place	2017 Cluj-Napoca	Parallel Bars
Gold medal – first place	2024 Rimini	Team
Silver medal – second place	2012 Montpellier	Parallel Bars
Silver medal – second place	2016 Bern	Parallel Bars
Silver medal – second place	2024 Rimini	All-around
Bronze medal – third place	2013 Moscow	All-Around
Bronze medal – third place	2014 Sofia	Team
Bronze medal – third place	2014 Sofia	Vault
Bronze medal – third place	2017 Cluj-Napoca	Vault
Summer Universiade
Gold medal – first place	2015 Gwangju	All-Around
Gold medal – first place	2015 Gwangju	Parallel Bars
Gold medal – first place	2017 Taipei	All-Around
Silver medal – second place	2013 Kazan	Team
Silver medal – second place	2015 Gwangju	Floor Exercise
Silver medal – second place	2017 Taipei	Team
Silver medal – second place	2017 Taipei	Pommel Horse
Silver medal – second place	2017 Taipei	Vault
Bronze medal – third place	2013 Kazan	All-Around
Bronze medal – third place	2013 Kazan	Parallel Bars
Bronze medal – third place	2015 Gwangju	Team
Bronze medal – third place	2015 Gwangju	Rings
Bronze medal – third place	2015 Gwangju	Vault
Bronze medal – third place	2017 Taipei	Rings

Oleg Yuriyovych Verniaiev (Ukrainian: Олег Юрійович Верняєв; born 29 September 1993) is a Ukrainian artistic gymnast. He is the 2016 Olympic parallel bars champion and individual all-around silver medalist. Verniaiev is also the 2014 World parallel bars champion, the 2015 European individual all-around champion and the 2017 European individual all-around champion.

He is a three-time Olympian, having represented Ukraine at the 2012, 2016, and 2024 Olympic Games. He missed the 2020 Olympic Games due to a doping ban resulting from having tested positive for the banned substance meldonium in an out-of-competition test in August 2020.

== Personal life ==
Verniaiev was born in Donetsk. He was educated at the Donetsk State Institute of Health, Physical Education and Sport.

Verniaiev resides in Kyiv. He is coached by Gennady Sartynsky.

== Gymnastics career ==
=== 2011–2012 ===
During the 2011 Summer Universiade Verniaiev competed in the men's vault final, finishing in seventh with a score of 15.262. He was also part of the Ukrainian team that finished fifth in the men's team final. At the 2011 World Championships he competed in the team all-around event with Nikolai Kuksenkov, Vitaliy Nakonechnyi, Oleg Stepko, Igor Radivilov, and Roman Zozulya, finishing in fifth. He scored 14.461 on floor, 13.866 on pommel horse, 14.833 on vault, and 13.800 on parallel bars.

Verniaiev finished sixth in the 2012 American Cup with a score of 88.132. At the 2012 European Championships he participated in the team all-around final for the Ukrainian team that finished in fifth. He also made the parallel bars final, finishing in second place with a score of 15.66, 0.1 points behind the winner Marcel Nguyen of Germany.

He was victorious in the all-around final of the 2012 Ukrainian Championships, scoring 90.300 points and winning by a margin of 2.65 points over second place Oleg Stepko.

Verniaiev competed at the 2012 Olympic Games in the men's team event alongside Nikolai Kuksenkov, Vitalii Nakonechnyi, Oleg Stepko and Igor Radivilov. In the team final Ukraine finished in fourth with a score of 271.526, missing out on a medal by less than 0.2 points. Ukraine was initially awarded third place for a bronze medal; however following an appeal from Japan over a pommel horse score, the Japanese team was awarded an extra 0.7 points, allowing them to move from fourth place to second, knocking Ukraine out of the medals in the process. Verniaiev finished eleventh in the individual all-around final with a score of 88.931.

=== 2013–2016 ===
Verniaiev won the Ukrainian National Championships in 2013. He took the silver medal in the individual all-around finals at the 2013 American Cup. He won the bronze medal in the individual all-around at the 2013 European Championships in Moscow, Russia.

At the 2013 Summer Universiade, Verniaiev led his Ukrainian team (Igor Radivilov, Oleg Stepko, Petro Pakhnyuk, and Maksym Semiankiv) to a second-place finish in the team final, and qualified for the all-around final. He won the all-around bronze medal (tied with Russian gymnast David Belyavskiy). He won another bronze medal in the parallel bars final.

In May 2014, at the 2014 European Championships in Sofia, Bulgaria, Verniaiev contributed scores of 15.100 (floor), 14.400 (pommel horse), 14.900 (rings), 14.783 (vault), 15.591 (parallel bars), and 14.600 (horizontal bar), helping Ukraine win the team bronze medal with a total score of 262.087 points behind Great Britain. In event finals, Verniaiev won the gold medal on the parallel bars (15.966) and won the bronze medal on vault (14.916).

He won gold on the parallel bars at the 2014 World Championships in Nanning, China. After the wrong anthem (the anthem of Uzbekistan) was played during the medal ceremony, he said "It was written in my face that I didn't like it. They came up and apologised for the anthem and promised to change it for TV broadcast. But I thought it would be incorrect, because I screwed up my face and it will be even worse if the anthem is replaced."

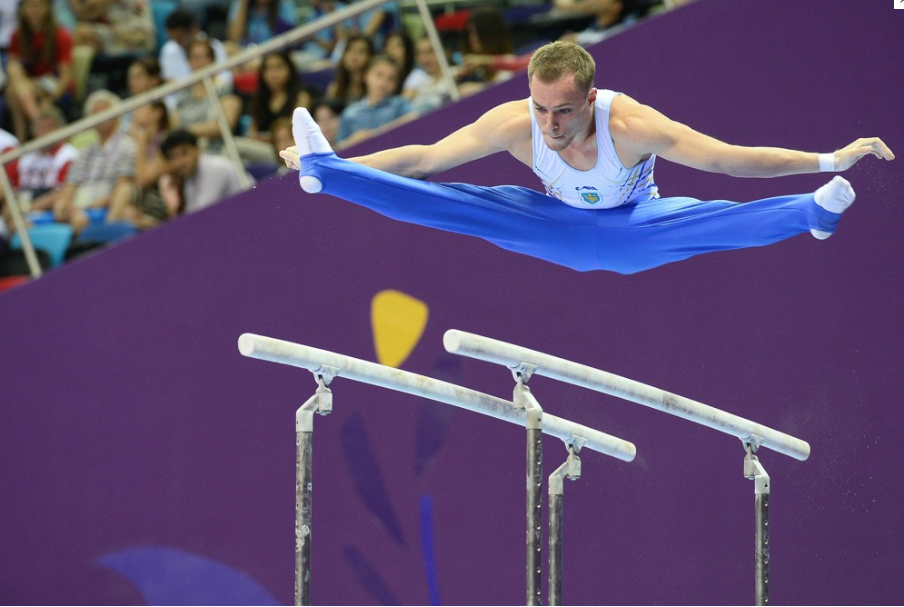
Verniaiev at the 2015 European Games

Verniaiev won the 2015 American Cup in Arlington, Texas with a score of 90.597, 0.499 over silver medalist and 2013 World Championships all-around silver medalist Ryōhei Katō of Japan. Verniaiev also became the FIG World Cup series champion. At the 2015 European Championships Verniaiev won the individual all-around with a score of 89.582, beating 2013 champion David Belyavskiy. He also qualified to the parallel bars final where he won the gold medal with a score of 15.866. At the 2015 European Games, Verniaiev was part of the Ukrainian team, winning silver in the team final behind Russia. Verniaiev qualified into the all-around, floor exercise, pommel horse, vault, parallel bars, and high bar finals. He won the all-around final with a score of 90.332, and the vault final with a score of 15.266. He placed sixth on floor exercise with 14.233, and fifth on pommel horse (13.833), parallel bars (14.633), and high bar (14.900).

At the 2016 European Championships Verniaiev won a gold medal on vault and a silver medal on parallel bars. In August 2016, at the 2016 Olympic Games, he won the silver medal in the men's all-around competition with a score of 92.266, only 0.099 behind Kōhei Uchimura's 92.365. Verniaiev's Olympic all-around medal was Ukraine's first since Alexander Beresch won bronze at the 2000 Olympic Games.

Verniaiev also gained prominence for his public apology over the Ukrainian squad's strategy during the team final, when due to injuries they did not put up gymnasts on all events, effectively ruling the team out of contention. He won the gold medal on the parallel bars, scoring 16.041, giving Ukraine its first gymnastics gold at the Games since 2004. He also finished fifth on vault and eighth on pommel horse and horizontal bar.

=== 2017–2020 ===
At the 2017 European Championships Verniaiev won gold medals in the individual all-around and on the parallel bars, and a bronze medal on vault. At the 2017 Summer Universiade, Verniaiev won the gold medal in the individual all-around competition, and won silver with the team and on vault and pommel horse, and won the bronze medal on rings. At the 2017 World Championships Verniaiev won silver on parallel bars behind Zou Jingyuan.

At the 2018 World Championships Verniaiev once again won silver on parallel bars behind Zou.

In 2019 Verniaiev competed at the European Championships where he placed seventh on pommel horse and eighth on parallel bars. He next competed at the 2019 European Games where he won gold on parallel bars, silver in the all-around and on pommel horse, both behind David Belyavskiy. At the 2019 World Championships Verniaiev won bronze in the all-around behind Nikita Nagornyy and Artur Dalaloyan.

Verniaiev began 2020 competing at the American Cup, where he won silver behind Sam Mikulak. The remainder of competitions in 2020 were either canceled or postponed due to the global COVID-19 pandemic.

== Doping and ban ==
In December 2020 Verniaiev was notified by the International Gymnastics Federation that he was provisionally suspended from competition, backdated to November 2020. The reason for the suspension was a positive test for meldonium, which was banned by the World Anti-Doping Agency starting in January 2016. Following arbitration, the provisional suspension was upheld and Verniaiev was banned from competition for four years. During this suspension timeframe Verniaiev would miss both the 2020 Olympic Games (rescheduled to 2021) and the 2024 Olympic Games.

In July 2021 Verniaiev expressed his intention to appeal the suspension to the Court of Arbitration for Sport, contending that meldonium was not found in subsequent tests. He acknowledged the presence of the drug in his body, but said he does not know how it got there.

On March 14, 2023, Verniaiev announced that his appeal was successful and the CAS reduced his ban to two years, resulting in his ability to return to competition immediately.

== Post-ban gymnastics career ==
=== 2023–2024 ===
Verniaiev made his return to competition in September 2023 at the Mersin Challenge Cup where he won gold on parallel bars and silver on pommel horse behind Ahmad Abu Al-Soud. He competed at the 2023 World Championships where he helped Ukraine finish twelfth during qualifications. Although they didn't qualify to the team final, they qualified a full team to the 2024 Olympic Games.

Verniaiev competed at the 2024 European Championships alongside Nazar Chepurnyi, Illia Kovtun, Igor Radivilov, and Radomyr Stelmakh; together they qualified to the team final in first place and individually Verniaiev won silver in the all-around behind Marios Georgiou. During the team final Verniaiev contributed scores on all six apparatuses towards Ukraine's first place finish.

Verniaiev competed at the 2024 Olympic Games alongside Chepurnyi, Kovtun, Radivilov, and Stelmakh. During the qualification round he helped Ukraine qualify to the team final and individually he qualified to the all-around, pommel horse, and parallel bars finals. During the team final Verniaiev contributed scores on all six apparatuses towards Ukraine's fifth place finish. He finished eighth in the all-around, fifth on pommel horse, and eighth on parallel bars.

== Competitive history ==
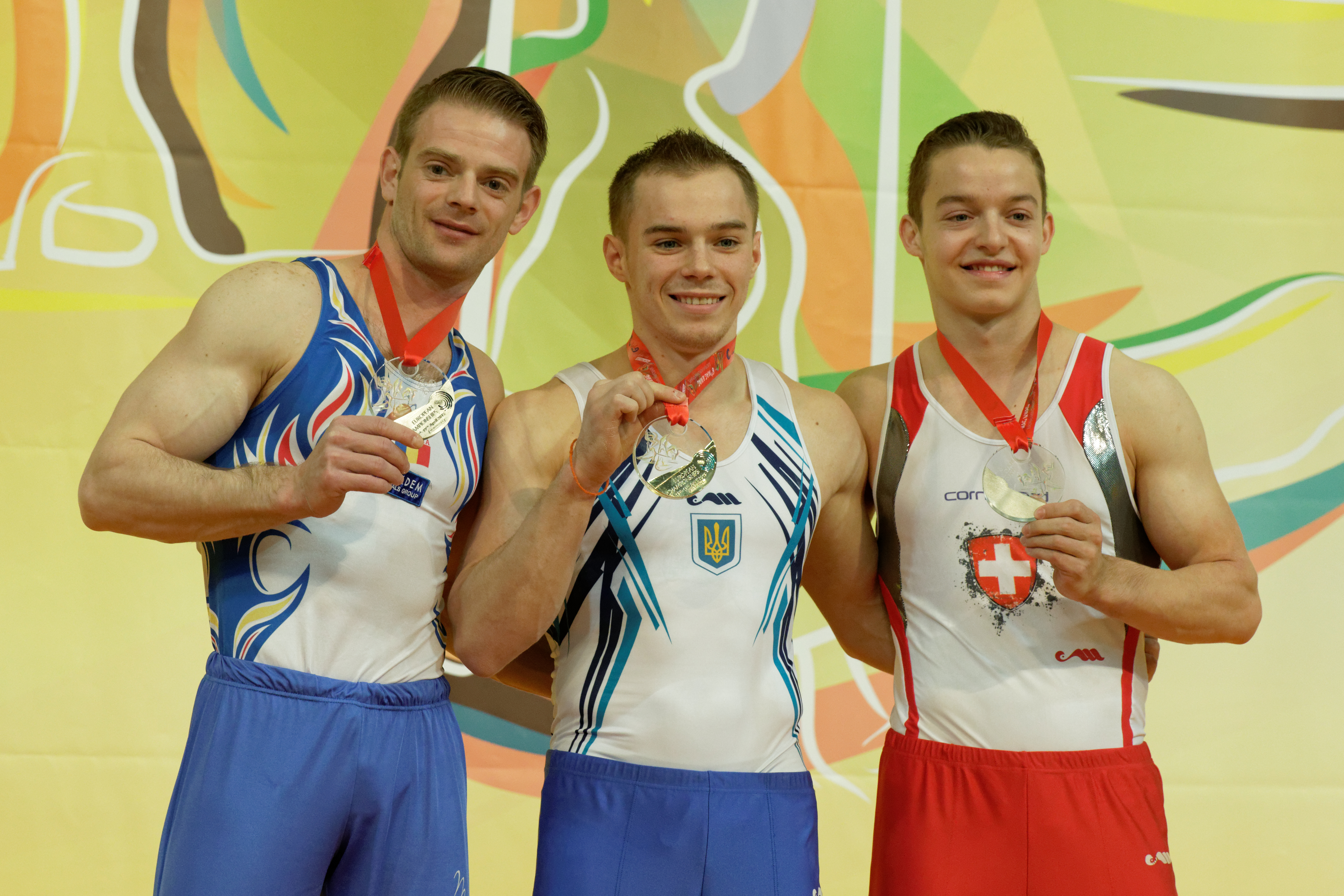
Verniaiev (center) at the 2015 European Championships

Competitive history of Oleg Verniaiev
Year	Event	Team	AA	FX	PH	SR	VT	PB	HB
2011	Summer Universiade	5					7		
2011	World Championships	5							
2012	Olympic Test Event		14					6	
2012	American Cup		6						
2012	European Championships	5						2nd place, silver medalist(s)	
2012	Olympic Games	4	11						
2012	Ostrava Challenge Cup							1st place, gold medalist(s)	
2013	American Cup		2nd place, silver medalist(s)						
2013	La Roche-sur-Yon World Cup							2nd place, silver medalist(s)	
2013	Tokyo World Cup		1st place, gold medalist(s)						
2013	European Championships		3rd place, bronze medalist(s)				6	5	
2013	Summer Universiade	2nd place, silver medalist(s)	3rd place, bronze medalist(s)	8	4			3rd place, bronze medalist(s)	
2013	World Championships		15				8		
2013	Swiss Cup	4							
2013	Stuttgart World Cup		1st place, gold medalist(s)						
2013	Glasgow World Cup		1st place, gold medalist(s)						
2014	Cottbus Challenge Cup				5	7	8	8	7
2014	Ljubljana Challenge Cup				1st place, gold medalist(s)			1st place, gold medalist(s)	
2014	European Championships	3rd place, bronze medalist(s)			5		3rd place, bronze medalist(s)	1st place, gold medalist(s)	
2014	World Championships	9	4					1st place, gold medalist(s)	
2014	Swiss Cup	2nd place, silver medalist(s)							
2014	Stuttgart World Cup		1st place, gold medalist(s)						
2014	Glasgow World Cup		1st place, gold medalist(s)						
2015	American Cup		1st place, gold medalist(s)						
2015	Cottbus Challenge Cup				1st place, gold medalist(s)	4	2nd place, silver medalist(s)	1st place, gold medalist(s)	
2015	Ljubljana Challenge Cup				1st place, gold medalist(s)				
2015	European Championships		1st place, gold medalist(s)					1st place, gold medalist(s)	
2015	European Games	2nd place, silver medalist(s)	1st place, gold medalist(s)	6	5		1st place, gold medalist(s)	5	5
2015	Summer Universiade	3rd place, bronze medalist(s)	1st place, gold medalist(s)	2nd place, silver medalist(s)	6	3rd place, bronze medalist(s)	3rd place, bronze medalist(s)	1st place, gold medalist(s)	
2015	World Championships		4		6		4	2nd place, silver medalist(s)	
2015	Osijek Challenge Cup				7			1st place, gold medalist(s)	
2015	Arthur Gander Memorial		1st place, gold medalist(s)						
2015	Swiss Cup	1st place, gold medalist(s)							
2016	Olympic Test Event	2nd place, silver medalist(s)		1st place, gold medalist(s)	7	7	1st place, gold medalist(s)	1st place, gold medalist(s)	6
2016	Osijek Challenge Cup				1st place, gold medalist(s)		1st place, gold medalist(s)	4	
2016	Varna Challenge Cup			1st place, gold medalist(s)	1st place, gold medalist(s)	2nd place, silver medalist(s)	7	1st place, gold medalist(s)	8
2016	European Championships	4		7			1st place, gold medalist(s)	2nd place, silver medalist(s)	7
2016	Olympic Games	8	2nd place, silver medalist(s)		8		5	1st place, gold medalist(s)	8
2016	Arthur Gander Memorial		1st place, gold medalist(s)						
2016	Swiss Cup	1st place, gold medalist(s)							
2016	Cottbus World Cup			3rd place, bronze medalist(s)	2nd place, silver medalist(s)	6	1st place, gold medalist(s)	5	1st place, gold medalist(s)
2017	American Cup		2nd place, silver medalist(s)						
2017	Stuttgart World Cup		1st place, gold medalist(s)						
2017	London World Cup		1st place, gold medalist(s)						
2017	European Championships		1st place, gold medalist(s)	7	7		3rd place, bronze medalist(s)	1st place, gold medalist(s)	8
2017	Summer Universiade	2nd place, silver medalist(s)	1st place, gold medalist(s)	5	2nd place, silver medalist(s)	3rd place, bronze medalist(s)	2nd place, silver medalist(s)		
2017	Varna Challenge Cup				5		8	2nd place, silver medalist(s)	5
2017	Paris Challenge Cup			8		3rd place, bronze medalist(s)	3rd place, bronze medalist(s)	1st place, gold medalist(s)	
2017	World Championships		8		7			2nd place, silver medalist(s)	
2017	Arthur Gander Memorial		1st place, gold medalist(s)						
2017	Swiss Cup	4							
2017	Cottbus Challenge Cup				4			2nd place, silver medalist(s)	
2018	Szombathely Challenge Cup			2nd place, silver medalist(s)	1st place, gold medalist(s)		3rd place, bronze medalist(s)	3rd place, bronze medalist(s)	
2018	Kyiv Open		1st place, gold medalist(s)						
2018	World Championships	9	14					2nd place, silver medalist(s)	
2018	Cottbus World Cup							1st place, gold medalist(s)	
2018	Arthur Gander Memorial		8						
2018	Swiss Cup	4							
2019
2019	European Championships				7			8	
2019	Stella Zakharova Cup				4			4	
2019	European Games		2nd place, silver medalist(s)		2nd place, silver medalist(s)			1st place, gold medalist(s)	
2019	Szombathely Challenge Cup			2nd place, silver medalist(s)	2nd place, silver medalist(s)	5	4	1st place, gold medalist(s)	4
2019	World Championships	8	3rd place, bronze medalist(s)						
2019	Cottbus World Cup				3rd place, bronze medalist(s)			1st place, gold medalist(s)	
2020	American Cup		2nd place, silver medalist(s)						
2020	Ukrainian Championships		1st place, gold medalist(s)	6	1st place, gold medalist(s)	2nd place, silver medalist(s)	1st place, gold medalist(s)	1st place, gold medalist(s)	
2023	Mersin Challenge Cup			6	2nd place, silver medalist(s)			1st place, gold medalist(s)	
2023	World Championships	12							
2024	Cairo World Cup							2nd place, silver medalist(s)	
2024	Cottbus World Cup							2nd place, silver medalist(s)	
2024	Baku World Cup							5	
2024	European Championships	1st place, gold medalist(s)	2nd place, silver medalist(s)						
2024	Olympic Games	5	8		5			8	
2025
2025	European Championships	11						8	
2026	Szombathely World Challenge Cup					2nd place, silver medalist(s)		2nd place, silver medalist(s)	
2026	Paris World Challenge Cup					8			
2026	World Championships	21							

== Olympic results ==
=== 2012 London Olympics ===
Event	Position	Floor (gymnastics)	Pommel horse	Rings (gymnastics)	Vault (gymnastics)	Parallel bars	Horizontal bar	Total
Individual all-around	11	14.533 (13)	13.966 (14)	14.866 (=7)	16.233 (2)	15.033 (12)	14.300 (17)	88.931
Team all-around	4	14.866 (16)	—N/a	—N/a	16.266 (3)	15.600 (2)	14.466 (20)	271.526 (team total)

=== 2016 Rio Olympics ===
Event	Position	Floor (gymnastics)	Pommel horse	Rings (gymnastics)	Vault (gymnastics)	Parallel bars	Horizontal bar	Total
Individual all-around	2nd place, silver medalist(s)	15.033 (6)	15.533 (2)	15.300 (=3)	15.500 (2)	16.100 (1)	14.800 (=3)	92.266
Team all-around	8	—N/a	15.633 (2)	—N/a	—N/a	15.900 (2)	—N/a	202.078 (team total)
Horizontal bar	8	—N/a	—N/a	—N/a	—N/a	—N/a	13.366	13.366
Parallel bars	1st place, gold medalist(s)	—N/a	—N/a	—N/a	—N/a	16.041	—N/a	16.041
Pommel horse	8	—N/a	12.400	—N/a	—N/a	—N/a	—N/a	12.400
Vault	5	—N/a	—N/a	—N/a	15.316	—N/a	—N/a	15.316
