= Volodymyr Okachev =

Ukrainian artistic gymnast (born 1992)

- Володимир Окачев
- Born: 16 May 1992 (age 34) Kharkiv, Ukraine

Gymnastics career
- Discipline: Men's artistic gymnastics
- Country represented: Ukraine
Medal record
Representing Ukraine
Men's artistic Gymnastics
European Championships
| Bronze medal – third place | 2014 Sofia | Team |
Summer Universiade
| Bronze medal – third place | 2015 Gwangju | Team |

Volodymyr Okachev (born 16 May 1992 in Kharkiv) is a Ukrainian artistic gymnast.

== Gymnastics career ==
Okachev won a bronze in the team event at the 2014 European Men's Artistic Gymnastics Championships.

== Post-gymnastics career ==
As of October 2019, Okachev has coached gymnastics in Florida, United States.
