= Gymnastics at the 2016 Summer Olympics – Men's parallel bars =

Olympic gymnastics event

Men's parallel bars at the Games of the XXXI Olympiad
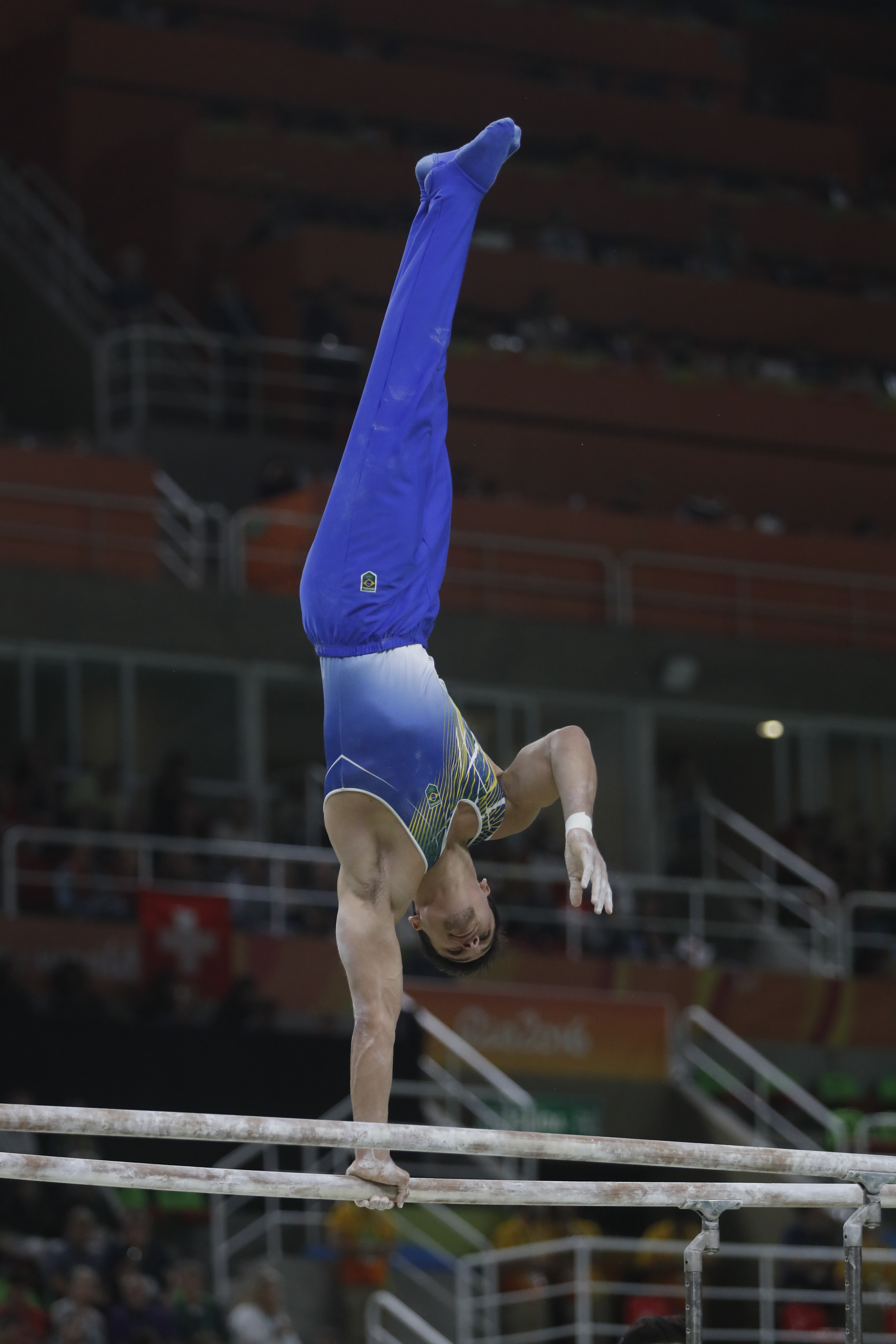
- Qualifying round competition on the parallel bars (Sérgio Sasaki)
- Venue: HSBC Arena
- Dates: 6 August (qualifying); 16 August 2016 (final)
- Competitors: 67 from 33 nations
- Winning score: 16.041

Medalists
1st place, gold medalist(s)		Oleg Verniaiev	Ukraine
2nd place, silver medalist(s)		Danell Leyva	United States
3rd place, bronze medalist(s)		David Belyavskiy	Russia

The men's parallel bars competition at the 2016 Summer Olympics was held at the HSBC Arena on 16 August. There were 67 competitors from 33 nations. The event was won by Oleg Verniaiev of Ukraine, the nation's first victory in the parallel bars since 2004 and third overall (tying Switzerland and China for third-most all-time after Japan and the Soviet Union with four). Danell Leyva won the United States' first medal in the event since 1996 with his silver; David Belyavskiy's bronze was Russia's first medal in the parallel bars since 2000. China's four-Games podium streak in the event ended.

The medals were presented by Sergey Bubka IOC member, Ukraine and Georges Guelzec, FIG Executive Committee Member.

== Background ==
This was the 24th appearance of the event, which is one of the five apparatus events held every time there were apparatus events at the Summer Olympics (no apparatus events were held in 1900, 1908, 1912, or 1920). Four of the nine finalists from 2012 returned: silver medalist Marcel Nguyen of Germany, fifth-place finisher Daniel Corral of Mexico, eighth-place finisher Yusuke Tanaka of Japan, and ninth-place finisher Zhang Chenglong of China. The field was studded with stars. 2011 world champion Danell Leyva of the United States had been favored in 2012 before failing to make the final, had come in second in the 2014 world championship, and had been elevated from reserve after a teammate's injury. The 2013 world champions were Kōhei Uchimura of Japan and Lin Chaopan of China. The 2014 world champion (and 2015 runner-up) was Oleg Verniaiev of Ukraine. You Hao of China was the 2015 world champion.

Cyprus, Lithuania, Monaco, and Turkey each made their debut in the men's parallel bars. The United States made its 22nd appearance, most of any nation; the Americans had missed only the inaugural 1896 event and the boycotted 1980 Games.

== Qualification ==
Qualification for the men's artistic gymnastics in 2008 was based primarily on the 2015 World Artistic Gymnastics Championships. The top 8 teams at the world championships could send a full team of 5 gymnasts to the Olympics. The next 8 teams (#9 through #16) competed in the 2012 Gymnastics Olympic Test Event, with the top 4 of those teams also qualifying a team of 5 gymnasts for the Olympics. The individual apparatus medalists from the World Championships also qualified, if their nation had not already qualified a team. There were places reserved for host country and continental representation, and the Tripartite Commission made an invitation. The quota of 98 gymnasts was then filled through the individual all-around rankings at the Test Event, with each nation able to qualify only one gymnast in that manner (though this one gymnast could be added to the world championship apparatus medalists—for example, Romania qualified Marian Drăgulescu as silver medalist in the vault and Andrei Muntean through the Test Event).

== Competition format ==
The top 8 qualifiers in the qualification phase (limit two per NOC), based on combined score of each apparatus, advanced to the individual all-around final. The finalists performed on each apparatus again. Qualification scores were then ignored, with only final round scores counting.

== Schedule ==
All times are Brasília Time (UTC-03:00)

Date	Time	Round
Saturday, 6 August 2016	11:00	Qualifying
Tuesday, 16 August 2016	14:00	Final

== Results ==
=== Qualifying ===
The gymnasts who ranked top eight qualified for final round. In case of there were more than two gymnasts in same NOC, the last ranked among them would not qualify to final round. The next best ranked gymnast would qualify instead. Thus, Lin Chaopan did not advance despite placing sixth in qualifying; China had two other gymnasts placed third and fifth.

=== Final ===
Rank	Gymnast	Nation	D Score	E Score	Pen.	Total
1st place, gold medalist(s)	Oleg Verniaiev	Ukraine	7.100	8.941		16.041
2nd place, silver medalist(s)	Danell Leyva	United States	6.900	9.000		15.900
3rd place, bronze medalist(s)	David Belyavskiy	Russia	6.900	8.883		15.783
4	Deng Shudi	China	7.200	8.566		15.766
5	Manrique Larduet	Cuba	7.100	8.525		15.625
6	Andrei Muntean	Romania	6.600	9.000		15.600
7	Ryōhei Katō	Japan	6.800	8.433		15.233
8	You Hao	China	7.400	7.433		14.833
