= Vitaliy Nakonechnyi =

Ukrainian artistic gymnast (born 1986)

Vitalii Nakonechnyi
- Born: August 2, 1986 (age 40) Kalush, Ukrainian SSR, Soviet Union
- Height: 5 ft 7 in (1.70 m)

Gymnastics career
- Discipline: Men's artistic gymnastics
- Country represented: Ukraine
- Club: Ukraina
- Head coach: Mykola Nazarenko

Vitalii Nakonechnyi (Ukrainian: Віталій Наконечний, born 2 August 1986 in Kalush) is a Ukrainian gymnast.

At the 2011 World Artistic Gymnastics Championships, he competed in the team all-around event, joining Oleg Verniaiev, Nikolai Kuksenkov, Oleg Stepko, Igor Radivilov and Roman Zozulya to finish 5th. He competed for the national team at the 2012 Summer Olympics in the Men's artistic team all-around and the Men's pommel horse. He competed in a team with Mykola Kuksenkov, Igor Radivilov, Oleg Stepko and Oleg Verniaiev for Ukraine in the team final finishing in 4th place. In the pommel horse final he finished in 6th place with a score of 14.766.
