= Vigen Khachatryan =

Armenian politician (1951–2023)

Member of the National Assembly of Armenia
- In office 2 August 2021 – 21 June 2023

Governor of Lori Province
- In office 1997–1998

Personal details
- Born: Vigen Sureni Khachatryan; 7 July 1951 Ijevan, Armenian SSR, USSR
- Died: 21 June 2023 (aged 71)
- Party: KP
- Education: National Polytechnic University of Armenia
- Occupation: Engineer

Vigen Sureni Khachatryan (Armenian: Վիգեն Սուրենի Խաչատրյան; 7 July 1951 – 21 June 2023) was an Armenian engineer and politician. A member of the Civil Contract, he served in the National Assembly from 2021 to 2023.

Khachatryan died of a heart attack on 21 June 2023, at the age of 71.
