= Maksym Semiankiv =

Ukrainian artistic gymnast (born 1992)

- Full name: Maksym Oleksandrovych Semiankiv
- Born: 20 January 1992 (age 34) Kamianske, Dnipropetrovsk Oblast, Ukraine
- Height: 1.72 m (5 ft 8 in)

Gymnastics career
- Discipline: Men's artistic gymnastics
- Country represented: Ukraine (2015)
Medal record
Men's artistic gymnastics
Representing Ukraine
Summer Universiade
Silver medal – second place	2013 Kazan	Team

Maksym Oleksandrovych Semiankiv (Ukrainian: Максим Олександрович Семянків; born January 20, 1992) is a Ukrainian male artistic gymnast and part of the national team. He participated at the 2015 World Artistic Gymnastics Championships in Glasgow, and qualified for the 2016 Summer Olympics.
