= Eddy Yusof =

Swiss artistic gymnast (born 1994)

- Yusof vaulting at the 2016 Summer Olympics

Personal information
- Born: 2 October 1994 (age 31) Pfäffikon, Zürich, Switzerland
- Height: 1.65 m (5 ft 5 in)

Gymnastics career
- Discipline: Men's artistic gymnastics
- Country represented: Switzerland (2010–2023)
- Club: TV Bülach
- Head coach: Bernhard Fluck
- Retired: 2023
Medal record
Men's artistic gymnastics
Representing Switzerland
European Championships
| Bronze medal – third place | 2016 Bern | Team |

Eddy Yusof (born 2 October 1994) is a Swiss retired artistic gymnast. He won a team bronze medal at the 2016 European Championships and competed at the 2016 and 2020 Summer Olympics.

== Gymnastics career ==
Yusof competed at his first World Championships in 2014. While there, he helped Switzerland advance to its first World team final in 25 years, and they finished seventh. He missed the 2015 European Championships due to a fractured toe. At the 2015 World Championships, he helped the Swiss team finish sixth in the team final and win an Olympic berth.

Yusof won a bronze medal with the Swiss team at the 2016 European Championships. He was selected to represent Switzerland at the 2016 Summer Olympics alongside Christian Baumann, Pablo Brägger, Benjamin Gischard, and Oliver Hegi. The team finished ninth in the qualification round for the 2016 Summer Olympics, making them the first reserve for the final. He advanced into the individual all-around final and finished 12th, the best Swiss result in this competition since 1984.

Yusof placed fifth in the all-around at the 2017 American Cup. At the 2017 European Championships, he placed fifth in the parallel bars final. He then placed 19th in the all-around final at the 2017 World Championships. At the 2018 World Championships, he helped the Swiss team place sixth.

Yusof placed eighth in the all-around at the 2019 Stuttgart World Cup. He advanced into the all-around final at the 2019 European Championships and placed 14th. At the 2019 World Championships, he helped Switzerland advance into the team final and earn an Olympic berth.

Yusof represented Switzerland at the 2020 Summer Olympics with Baumann, Brägger, and Gischard. They qualified for the team final for the first time since 1984 and finished sixth. Individually, he advanced into the all-around final and finished 16th.

At the 2023 European Championships, Yusof helped the Swiss team place fourth. Individually, he qualified for the parallel bars final, but he fell on the dismount and finished sixth. He was named the alternate for the 2023 World Championships team. He decided to retire at the end of the 2023 season due to a back injury that had caused him pain for four years.

== Personal life ==
Yusof is of Malaysian descent through his father, and his mother is Swiss. In 2024, he began studying at the Zurich University of Teacher Education.
