= 2016 European Men's Artistic Gymnastics Championships =

32nd European Championships in Men's Artistic Gymnastics Seniors and Juniors
- Venue: PostFinance-Arena
- Location: Bern, Switzerland
- Dates: 25 to 29 May 2016
- Nations: Members of the European Union of Gymnastics

The 32nd European Championships in Men's Artistic Gymnastics Seniors and Juniors was held from 25 to 29 May 2016 at the PostFinance-Arena in Bern, Switzerland.

== Senior Results ==
=== Team competition ===
Rank	Team	Floor (gymnastics)	Pommel horse	Rings (gymnastics)	Vault (gymnastics)	Parallel bars	Horizontal bar	Total
1st place, gold medalist(s)	Russia	45.866 (1)	45.099 (1)	45.283 (2)	46.199 (1)	45.665 (1)	43.266 (2)	271.378
1st place, gold medalist(s)	Denis Ablyazin	15.100		15.200	15.666			271.378
1st place, gold medalist(s)	David Belyavskiy	15.166	15.433		15.233	15.933	14.733	271.378
1st place, gold medalist(s)	Nikita Ignatyev			14.833			14.333	271.378
1st place, gold medalist(s)	Nikolai Kuksenkov		15.066			14.266	14.200	271.378
1st place, gold medalist(s)	Nikita Nagornyy	15.500	14.600	15.250	15.300	15.466		271.378
2nd place, silver medalist(s)	Great Britain	45.132 (2)	44.566 (2)	45.499 (1)	44.866 (2)	43.966 (3)	43.365 (1)	268.427
2nd place, silver medalist(s)	Daniel Purvis	15.066	14.500	14.633	14.866	14.700	14.166	268.427
2nd place, silver medalist(s)	Louis Smith		15.966					268.427
2nd place, silver medalist(s)	Kristian Thomas	15.166			15.000		15.033	268.427
2nd place, silver medalist(s)	Courtney Tulloch			15.766		14.300		268.427
2nd place, silver medalist(s)	Nile Wilson	14.900	14.100	15.100	14.633	15.966	14.966	268.427
3rd place, bronze medalist(s)	Switzerland	44.832 (3)	43.566 (4)	43.566 (6)	43.316 (6)	45.532 (2)	42.466 (3)	263.278
3rd place, bronze medalist(s)	Christian Baumann		14.100	14.433		15.300	14.333	263.278
3rd place, bronze medalist(s)	Pablo Brägger	15.133			13.000	15.266	14.633	263.278
3rd place, bronze medalist(s)	Benjamin Gischard	15.066	14.200	14.500	15.200			263.278
3rd place, bronze medalist(s)	Oliver Hegi		15.266				13.500	263.278
3rd place, bronze medalist(s)	Eddy Yusof	14.633		14.633	14.816	14.966		263.278
4	Ukraine	42.298 (4)	43.233 (5)	44.333 (3)	44.466 (3)	43.300 (6)	40.066 (5)	257.696
4	Vladyslav Hryko		14.100	13.933				257.696
4	Ihor Radivilov			15.200	15.100		11.800	257.696
4	Maksym Semiankiv	14.266				14.600	13.500	257.696
4	Oleg Verniaiev	14.066	15.000	15.200	15.400	16.100	14.766	257.696
4	Illia Yehorov	13.666	14.133		13.966	12.600		257.696
5	Germany	41.599 (7)	44.165 (3)	43.966 (5)	42.800 (8)	44.749 (4)	39.132 (7)	256.411
5	Waldemar Eichorn	14.033	15.066					256.411
5	Philipp Herder	14.400		14.400	14.100	14.866		256.411
5	Sebastian Krimmer	13.066	14.866		14.100	14.783	12.166	256.411
5	Marcel Nguyen			14.933		15.100	12.933	256.411
5	Andreas Toba		14.233	14.633	14.600		14.033	256.411
6	France	40.799 (8)	42.299 (6)	44.166 (4)	44.233 (4)	43.332 (5)	39.216 (6)	254.045
6	Samir Aït Saïd	14.200		15.500	14.600			254.045
6	Julien Gobaux	12.566	13.100	14.233	14.133	13.966	13.700	254.045
6	Zachari Hrimèche	13.633			15.400		12.433	254.045
6	Danny Pinheiro Rodrigues		13.666	14.433		14.266	13.083	254.045
6	Cyril Tommasone		15.533			15.100		254.045
7	Italy	41.766 (6)	41.082 (7)	43.399 (7)	43.798 (5)	41.700 (7)	41.632 (4)	253.377
7	Andrea Cingolani	13.866		14.600	14.966	13.900		253.377
7	Ludovico Edalli		13.333			14.200	13.500	253.377
7	Enrico Pozzo	13.400	13.566			13.300	14.166	253.377
7	Paolo Principi	14.300	14.183	13.866	14.166		13.966	253.377
7	Marco Lodadio			14.933	14.666			253.377
8	Spain	42.066 (5)	40.199 (8)	42.700 (8)	43.198 (7)	38.199 (8)	38.333 (8)	244.695
8	Néstor Abad		12.600	14.500	14.866	12.833	12.800	244.695
8	Joel Plata Rodríguez	12.900	13.766			12.133	11.800	244.695
8	Alberto Tallón		13.833	14.400	12.966	13.233		244.695
8	Adrià Vera Mora	14.333		13.800	15.066		13.733	244.695
8	Rayderley Zapata	14.533						244.695

=== Floor ===
Position	Gymnast	D Score	E Score	Penalty	Total
1st place, gold medalist(s)	Nikita Nagornyy (RUS)	6.8	8.766		15.566
2nd place, silver medalist(s)	Marian Drăgulescu (ROU)	6.8	8.633	-0.1	15.333
3rd place, bronze medalist(s)	Alexander Shatilov (ISR)	6.6	8.800	-0.1	15.300
4	David Belyavskiy (RUS)	6.5	8.700		15.200
5	Pablo Braegger (SUI)	6.5	8.700	-0.1	15.100
6	Kristian Thomas (GBR)	6.2	8.841		15.041
7	Oleg Verniaiev (UKR)	6.6	8.100		14.700
8	Daniel Purvis (GBR)	6.2	8.433		14.633

=== Pommel horse ===
Position	Gymnast	D Score	E Score	Penalty	Total
1st place, gold medalist(s)	Harutyun Merdinyan (ARM)	6.9	8.466		15.366
2nd place, silver medalist(s)	David Belyavskiy (RUS)	6.6	8.633		15.233
3rd place, bronze medalist(s)	Christian Baumann (SUI)	6.3	8.600		14.900
4	Louis Smith (GBR)	6.9	7.833		14.733
5	Nikolai Kuksenkov (RUS)	6.7	7.866		14.566
6	Robert Seligman (CRO)	6.3	7.933		14.233
7	Sašo Bertoncelj (SLO)	6.4	7.800		14.200
8	Cyril Tommasone (FRA)	6.7	7.366		14.066

=== Rings ===
Position	Gymnast	D Score	E Score	Penalty	Total
1st place, gold medalist(s)	Eleftherios Petrounias (GRE)	6.8	9.066		15.866
2nd place, silver medalist(s)	Vahagn Davtyan (ARM)	6.7	8.933		15.633
2nd place, silver medalist(s)	Denis Ablyazin (RUS)	6.8	8.833		15.633
4	Courtney Tulloch (GBR)	6.9	8.666		15.566
4	Yuri van Gelder (NED)	6.8	8.766		15.566
6	Samir Aït Saïd (FRA)	6.8	8.733		15.533
7	Dennis Goossens (BEL)	6.6	8.633		15.233
7	Ibrahim Colak (TUR)	6.7	8.533		15.233

=== Vault ===
Rank	Gymnast	D Score	E Score	Pen.	Score 1	D Score	E Score	Pen.	Score 2	Total
1st place, gold medalist(s)	Oleg Verniaiev (UKR)	6.0	9.366		15.366	6.0	9.433		15.433	15.399
2nd place, silver medalist(s)	Artur Davtyan (ARM)	6.0	9.400		15.400	6.0	9.233		15.233	15.316
2nd place, silver medalist(s)	Marian Drăgulescu (ROU)	6.0	9.433		15.433	6.2	9.100	-0.1	15.200	15.316
4	Kristian Thomas (GBR)	6.0	9.533		15.533	5.6	9.166		14.766	15.149
5	Zachari Hrimèche (FRA)	6.0	8.633		14.633	6.0	9.266		15.266	14.949
6	Nikita Nagornyy (RUS)	6.0	9.466		15.466	6.0	8.666	-0.3	14.366	14.916
7	Denis Ablyazin (RUS)	6.4	7.966	-0.3	14.066	6.2	7.800		14.000	14.033
8	Benjamin Gischard (SUI)	6.0	7.933	-0.1	13.833	5.6	7.933		13.533	13.683
Rank	Gymnast	Vault 1				Vault 2				Total

=== Parallel bars ===
Position	Gymnast	D Score	E Score	Penalty	Total
1st place, gold medalist(s)	David Belyavskiy (RUS)	6.9	9.133		16.033
2nd place, silver medalist(s)	Oleg Verniaiev (UKR)	6.9	8.816		15.716
3rd place, bronze medalist(s)	Marcel Nguyen (GER)	7.0	8.566		15.566
4	Marius Daniel Berbecar (ROU)	6.2	8.800		15.000
5	Andrei Vasile Muntean (ROU)	6.2	8.758		14.958
6	Christian Baumann (SUI)	6.6	7.733		14.333
7	Nikita Nagornyy (RUS)	6.5	7.600		14.100
8	Pablo Brägger (SUI)	6.2	7.733		13.933

=== Horizontal bar ===
Position	Gymnast	D Score	E Score	Penalty	Total
1st place, gold medalist(s)	Nile Wilson (GBR)	6.9	8.400		15.300
2nd place, silver medalist(s)	Kristian Thomas (GBR)	6.5	8.500		15.000
3rd place, bronze medalist(s)	David Belyavskiy (RUS)	6.2	8.741		14.941
4	Pablo Brägger (SUI)	6.9	7.866		14.766
5	Christian Baumann (SUI)	6.4	7.958		14.358
6	Ümit Şamiloğlu (TUR)	6.5	7.633		14.133
7	Oleg Verniaiev (UKR)	6.4	7.233		13.633
8	Vlasios Maras (GRE)	6.5	7.033		13.533

== Medalists ==
Event	Gold	Silver	Bronze
Seniors
Team	Russia; Denis Ablyazin; David Belyavskiy; Nikita Ignatyev; Nikolai Kuksenkov; Nikita Nagornyy	Great Britain; Daniel Purvis; Louis Smith; Kristian Thomas; Courtney Tulloch; Nile Wilson	Switzerland; Christian Baumann; Pablo Brägger; Benjamin Gischard; Oliver Hegi; Eddy Yusof
Floor Exercise	Nikita Nagornyy (RUS)	Marian Drăgulescu (ROU)	Alexander Shatilov (ISR)
Pommel Horse	Harutyun Merdinyan (ARM)	David Belyavskiy (RUS)	Christian Baumann (SUI)
Still Rings	Eleftherios Petrounias (GRE)	Vahagn Davtyan (ARM) Denis Ablyazin (RUS)	None Awarded
Vault	Oleg Verniaiev (UKR)	Artur Davtyan (ARM) Marian Drăgulescu (ROU)	None Awarded
Parallel Bars	David Belyavskiy (RUS)	Oleg Verniaiev (UKR)	Marcel Nguyen (GER)
Horizontal Bar	Nile Wilson (GBR)	Kristian Thomas (GBR)	David Belyavskiy (RUS)
Juniors
Team	Great Britain; Joe Fraser; Jamie Lewis; Joshua Nathan; Donell Osbourne; Giarnni Regini-Moran	Russia; Aleksandr Chicherov; Ildar Yuskaev; Andrey Makolov; Sergei Naidin; Maksim Sinichkin	Switzerland; Andreas Gribi; Moreno Kratter; Henji Mboyo; Noe Seifert; Samir Serhani
All-Around	Giarnni Regini-Moran (GBR)	Andrey Makolov (RUS)	Joe Fraser (GBR)
Floor Exercise	Giarnni Regini-Moran (GBR)	Andrey Makolov (RUS)	Krisztian Boncser (HUN)
Pommel Horse	Sergei Naidin (RUS)	Rhys McClenaghan (IRL)	Joe Fraser (GBR)
Still Rings	Nick Klessing (GER)	Artur Avetisyan (ARM)	Ildar Yuskaev (RUS)
Vault	Andrey Makolov (RUS)	Giarnni Regini-Moran (GBR)	Maksym Ivanov (UKR)
Parallel Bars	Joe Fraser (GBR)	Giarnni Regini-Moran (GBR)	Eduard Yermakov (UKR)
Horizontal Bar	Andrey Makolov (RUS)	Moreno Kratter (SUI) Joe Fraser (GBR)	None Awarded

== Junior Results ==
=== Team competition ===
Rank	Team	Floor (gymnastics)	Pommel horse	Rings (gymnastics)	Vault (gymnastics)	Parallel bars	Horizontal bar	Total
1st place, gold medalist(s)	Great Britain	43.499 (1)	41.665 (2)	40.808 (3)	44.066 (1)	43.299 (1)	40.099 (3)	253.436
1st place, gold medalist(s)	Joe Fraser	13.966	14.166	13.475	14.200	14.700	13.633	253.436
1st place, gold medalist(s)	Jamie Lewis	14.500	13.000	13.600	14.300	12.333		253.436
1st place, gold medalist(s)	Joshua Nathan	14.133	13.733	13.366			13.100	253.436
1st place, gold medalist(s)	Donell Osbourne				14.366	13.766	12.866	253.436
1st place, gold medalist(s)	Giarnni Regini-Moran	14.866	13.766	13.733	15.400	14.833	13.366	253.436
2nd place, silver medalist(s)	Russia	41.166 (6)	42.655 (1)	42.599 (1)	43.365 (2)	42.766 (3)	39.500 (5)	252.061
2nd place, silver medalist(s)	Aleksandr Chicherov	13.633	13.866			14.100	13.500	252.061
2nd place, silver medalist(s)	Ildar Yuskaev		12.600	14.333	14.466			252.061
2nd place, silver medalist(s)	Maksim Sinichkin	12.966		14.033	14.100	13.133	12.200	252.061
2nd place, silver medalist(s)	Andrei Makolov	14.533	13.966	14.233	14.633	14.633	13.800	252.061
2nd place, silver medalist(s)	Sergei Naidin	13.000	14.833	13.766	14.266	14.033	12.000	252.061
3rd place, bronze medalist(s)	Switzerland	42.599 (2)	40.499 (3)	41.099 (2)	42.465 (5)	42.132 (4)	41.165 (1)	249.959
3rd place, bronze medalist(s)	Andreas Gribi		13.366	13.600	14.033	14.133		249.959
3rd place, bronze medalist(s)	Moreno Kratter	13266					13.866	249.959
3rd place, bronze medalist(s)	Henji Mboyo	14.333	13.800	13.566	14.266	14.433	13.766	249.959
3rd place, bronze medalist(s)	Noe Seifert	13.800	13.333	13.233	13.266	11.933	12.966	249.959
3rd place, bronze medalist(s)	Samir Serhani	14.466	13.333	13.933	14.166	13.566	13.533	249.959
4	France	41.200 (5)	40.322 (4)	40.565 (5)	42.666 (4)	43.299 (1)	40.500 (2)	248.562
4	Cameron-Lie Bernardi	13.600	12.133	13.291	14.300	13.733		248.562
4	Robin Caillaud	14.100	13.533	13.333	13.000	14.033	13.600	248.562
4	Kevin Carvalho	13.500	12.933	13.566	14.266	14.433	13.700	248.562
4	Baptiste Miette		13.866	13.666		14.133	13.200	248.562
4	Antoine Pochon	12.633			14.100		11.900	248.562
5	Germany	41.824 (3)	38.865 (7)	13.175 (6)	41.698 (7)	41.099 (6)	39.100 (6)	243.094
5	Carlo Hoerr	13.200	13.066	13.175	13.766	13.500	12.900	243.094
5	Nick Klessing	14.066	12.633	14.400	13.666	13.700		243.094
5	Leonard Prügel	13.633	11.500		13.400		12.900	243.094
5	Tobias Radoi		13.166	12.933		13.666	13.000	243.094
5	Felix Remuta	14.125		11.166	14.266	13.733	13.200	243.094
6	Italy	40.466 (10)	39.291 (5)	41.233 (8)	41.500 (6)	39.232 (15)	38.499 (4)	242.084
6	Stefano Patron	13.100	13.141	13.641	13.466	11.000	13.466	242.084
6	Filippo Catellaro		12.566	13.266				242.084
6	Lorenzo Galli	12.000	13.600	13.266	14.166	13.300	13.633	242.084
6	Luca Lino Garza	13.500	13.133	12.900	14.233	13.166	12.700	242.084
6	Nicolò Mozzato	13.866			13.900	12.766	12.941	242.084
7	Ukraine	40.707 (7)	37.498 (6)	39.999 (4)	42.632 (3)	40.399 (5)	39.424 (22)	241.745
7	Nazar Chepurnyi	13.266	13.800	13.666	12.900	14.233	12.233	241.745
7	Maksym Ivanov	13.000			14.633			241.745
7	Oleksiy Robu		12.033	13.300		13.100	11.700	241.745
7	Maksym Vasylenko	13.533	12.416	13.033	13.900	12.966	11.833	241.745
7	Eduard Yermakov	13.908	13.258	13.733	14.300	14.233	12.400	241.745
8	Hungary	40.933 (4)	37.432 (12)	39.333 (9)	42.298 (10)	40.991 (13)	39.241 (10)	237.051
8	Krisztián Balázs	13.200		13.125		13.366	12.566	237.051
8	Krisztian Boncser	14.466	12.000	11.266	14.766	12.800	13.566	237.051
8	Soma Laszlo Csorvasi	13.200	12.500		13.266	12.166	12.133	237.051
8	Balasz Kiss		13.166	13.233	13.300			237.051
8	Krisztofer Mészáros	13.766	12.266	12.366	12.333	13.200	11.633	237.051

=== Individual all-around ===
Rank	Gymnast	Floor (gymnastics)	Pommel horse	Rings (gymnastics)	Vault (gymnastics)	Parallel bars	Horizontal bar	Total
1st place, gold medalist(s)	Giarnni Regini-Moran (GBR)	14.900	13.833	13.866	15.466	14.600	13.533	86.198
2nd place, silver medalist(s)	Andrei Makolov (RUS)	14.433	13.200	14.333	14.900	14.666	13.433	84.965
3rd place, bronze medalist(s)	Joe Fraser (GBR)	14.100	14.300	14.066	14.466	13.166	13.666	83.764
4	Eduard Yermakov (UKR)	13.400	13.466	13.833	14.433	14.100	12.700	81.932
5	Samir Serhani (SUI)	14.166	13.333	14.000	14.100	13.533	12.666	81.798
6	Kevin Carvalho (FRA)	13.266	13.166	13.358	14.200	14.400	13.333	81.723
7	Henji Mboyo (SUI)	14.400	13.200	13.900	14.333	14.266	11.033	81.132
8	Sergei Naidin (RUS)	13.700	12.100	13.400	14.266	13.500	13.466	80.432
9	Petar Vefić (SRB)	13.400	13.000	13.166	14.133	13.400	13.200	80.299
10	Nazar Chepurnyi (UKR)	13.500	13.900	13.666	12.575	14.016	12.500	80.157
11	Robin Caillaud (FRA)	13.533	13.166	12.866	13.233	13.766	13.533	80.097
11	Krisztian Boncser (HUN)	14.566	12.100	11.966	15.066	12.666	13.733	80.097
13	Rhys McClenaghan (IRL)	13.466	13.200	12.533	13.900	13.483	12.366	78.948
14	Takumi Onoshima (BEL)	13.400	13.633	12.766	13.366	13.100	12.666	78.931
14	Nicolau Mir (ESP)	13.766	12.033	13.133	13.833	13.533	12.633	78.931
16	Luca Lino Garza (ITA)	13.333	12.233	13.033	14.133	12.966	13.133	78.831
17	David Rumbutis (SWE)	13.633	11.000	13.166	14.266	13.633	13.100	78.798
18	Max Kooistra (NED)	13.366	13.466	12.700	13.066	13.266	12.700	78.564
19	Lorenzo Galli (ITA)	13.500	13.333	12.800	14.366	11.400	13.133	78.532
20	Kim Vanstroem (SWE)	14.133	12.133	12.733	13.866	12.833	12.791	78.489
21	Noah Kuavita (BEL)	13.766	12.633	12.766	13.933	12.283	12.808	78.189
22	Ilias Georgiou (CYP)	13.300	11.100	13.733	13.333	12.466	13.366	77.298
23	Dmitrii Govorov (GEO)	12.833	11.266	13.666	13.291	13.233	12.833	77.122
24	Carlo Hoerr (GER)	13.166	13.533	12.633	13.933	13.600	10.233	77.098

=== Floor ===
Rank	Gymnast	Nation	D Score	E Score	Pen.	Total
1st place, gold medalist(s)	Giarnni Regini-Moran	Great Britain	6.000	9.166		15.166
2nd place, silver medalist(s)	Andrei Makolov	Russia	5.600	9.100		14.700
3rd place, bronze medalist(s)	Krisztian Boncser	Hungary	5.800	8.866		14.666
4	Samir Serhani	Switzerland	5.500	9.000		14.500
5	Henji Mboyo	Switzerland	5.300	9.133		14.433
5	Jamie Lewis	Great Britain	5.400	9.033		14.433
7	Felix Remuta	Germany	5.800	8.500		14.300
8	Robin Caillaud	France	5.000	8.966		13.966

=== Pommel horse ===
Position	Gymnast	D Score	E Score	Penalty	Total
1st place, gold medalist(s)	Sergei Naidin (RUS)	5.800	8.866		14.666
2nd place, silver medalist(s)	Rhys McClenaghan (IRL)	5.900	8.666		14.566
3rd place, bronze medalist(s)	Joe Fraser (GBR)	5.700	8.633		14.333
4	Henji Mboyo (SUI)	5.400	8.708		14.108
5	Nazar Chepurnyi (UKR)	5.600	8.466		14.066
5	Baptiste Miette (FRA)	5.400	8.666		14.066
7	Andrei Makolov (RUS)	4.900	8.066		12.966
8	Joshua Nathan (GBR)	4.700	8.033		12.733

=== Rings ===
Position	Gymnast	D Score	E Score	Penalty	Total
1st place, gold medalist(s)	Nick Klessing (GER)	5.500	8.858		14.358
2nd place, silver medalist(s)	Artur Avetisyan (ARM)	5.200	9.100		14.300
3rd place, bronze medalist(s)	Ildar Yuskaev (RUS)	5.300	8.900		14.200
4	Samir Serhani (SUI)	5.200	8.700		13.900
5	Giarnni Regini-Moran (GBR)	4.900	8.833		13.733
6	Ilias Georgiou (CYP)	4.800	8.758		13.558
7	Hamza Yilmaz (TUR)	5.200	8.433	-0.6	13.033
8	Andrei Makolov (RUS)	5.200	8.066	-0.3	12.966

=== Vault ===
Rank	Gymnast	D Score	E Score	Pen.	Score 1	D Score	E Score	Pen.	Score 2	Total
1st place, gold medalist(s)	Andrei Makolov (RUS)	5.6	9.266		14.866	5.6	9.500		15.100	14.983
2nd place, silver medalist(s)	Giarnni Regini-Moran (GBR)	5.6	9.066		14.666	6.0	9.266		15.266	14.966
3rd place, bronze medalist(s)	Maksym Ivanov (UKR)	5.6	9.116		14.716	5.6	9.333		14.933	14.824
4	Krisztian Boncser (HUN)	5.6	9.300		14.900	5.2	9.133		14.333	14.616
5	Felix Remuta (GER)	5.6	9.166		14.766	5.6	8.566		14.166	14.466
6	Dmitrii Govorov (GEO)	5.6	9.033		14.633	5.6	7.800		13.400	14.016
7	Ildar Yuskaev (RUS)	5.6	7.866		13.466	5.2	9.200		14.400	13.933
8	Yahor Sharamkou (BLR)	5.6	9.066	-0.1	14.566	2.0	8.466		10.466	12.516

== Medal count ==
=== Combined ===
Rank	Nation	Gold	Silver	Bronze	Total
1	Russia	6	5	2	13
2	Great Britain	5	5	2	12
3	Armenia	1	3	0	4
4	Ukraine	1	1	2	4
5	Germany	1	0	1	2
6	Greece	1	0	0	1
7	Romania	0	2	0	2
8	Switzerland	0	1	3	4
9	Ireland	0	1	0	1
10	Hungary	0	0	1	1
10	Israel	0	0	1	1
Totals (11 entries)		15	18	12	45

=== Seniors ===
Rank	Nation	Gold	Silver	Bronze	Total
1	Russia	3	2	1	6
2	Armenia	1	2	0	3
2	Great Britain	1	2	0	3
4	Ukraine	1	1	0	2
5	Greece	1	0	0	1
6	Romania	0	2	0	2
7	Switzerland	0	0	2	2
8	Germany	0	0	1	1
8	Israel	0	0	1	1
Totals (9 entries)		7	9	5	21

=== Juniors ===
Rank	Nation	Gold	Silver	Bronze	Total
1	Great Britain	4	3	2	9
2	Russia	3	3	1	7
3	Germany	1	0	0	1
4	Switzerland	0	1	1	2
5	Armenia	0	1	0	1
5	Ireland	0	1	0	1
7	Ukraine	0	0	2	2
8	Hungary	0	0	1	1
Totals (8 entries)		8	9	7	24
