= Christian Baumann =

Swiss artistic gymnast (born 1995)

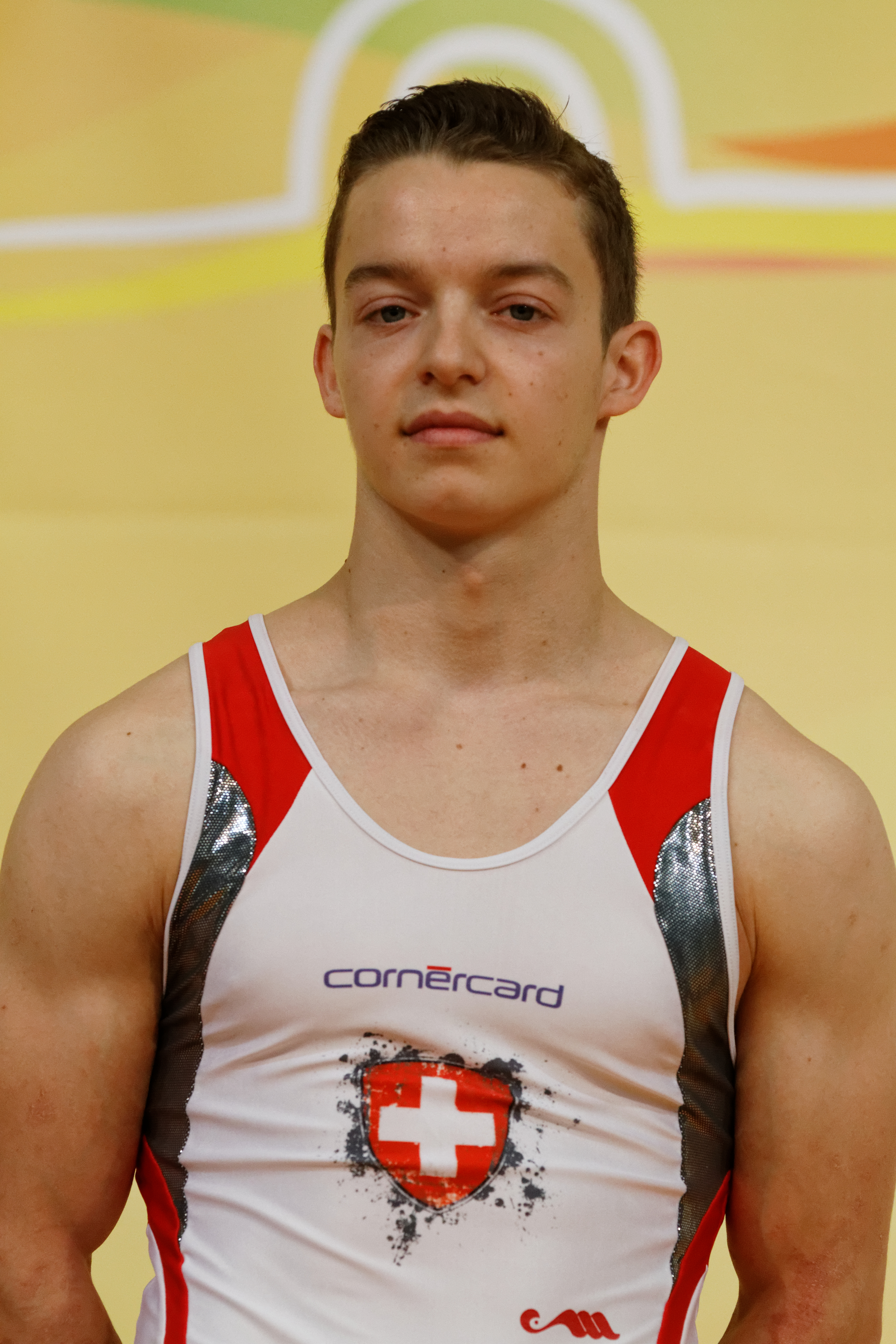
- Baumann at the 2015 European Championships

Personal information
- Born: 25 February 1995 (age 31) Leutwil, Aargau, Switzerland
- Height: 1.63 m (5 ft 4 in)

Gymnastics career
- Discipline: Men's artistic gymnastics
- Country represented: Switzerland (2014–2024)
- Club: STV Lenzburg
- Head coaches: Bernhard Fluck, Laurent Guelzac, Laurent Tricoire
- Eponymous skills: "Baumann" (Parallel Bars) - Giant swing bwd. with Makuts (F)
Medal record
Representing Switzerland
European Championships
Silver medal – second place	2015 Montpellier	Parallel bars
Bronze medal – third place	2016 Bern	Team
Bronze medal – third place	2016 Bern	Pommel horse
Bronze medal – third place	2021 Basel	Parallel bars

Christian Baumann (born 25 February 1995) is a Swiss former artistic gymnast. He represented Switzerland at the 2016 and 2020 Summer Olympics. He is the 2015 European silver medalist and the 2021 European bronze medalist in the parallel bars. He also won bronze medals with the Swiss team and on the pommel horse at the 2016 European Championships.

== Early life ==
Baumann was born on 25 February 1995. He started gymnastics at the age of five at the TV Lenzburg club in Switzerland.

== Gymnastics career ==
At the 2015 European Championships, he tied with Romania's Marius Berbecar for the silver medal on the parallel bars behind Ukraine's Oleg Verniaiev. Then at the 2016 European Championships, he helped the Swiss team win the bronze medal. He won a bronze medal in the pommel horse behind Harutyun Merdinyan and David Belyavskiy. He then competed with the Swiss team that finished ninth in the qualification round for the 2016 Summer Olympics, making them the first reserve for the final.

Baumann competed at the 2019 American Cup and finished sixth in the all-around. At the 2021 European Championships, he tied with Lukas Dauser for the bronze medal on the parallel bars. He then competed at the postponed 2020 Summer Olympics alongside Pablo Brägger, Benjamin Gischard, and Eddy Yusof. They qualified for the team final for the first time since 1984 and finished sixth.

Baumann was selected to compete at the 2023 World Championships. There, the Swiss team finished seventh during the qualification round and earned a team berth for the 2024 Olympic Games. Then in the team final, the Swiss team placed fifth which was the country's best finished at the World Artistic Gymnastics Championships since winning bronze in 1954.

Baumann competed at the 2024 European Championships alongside Matteo and Luca Giubellini, Noe Seifert, and Taha Serhani. The team qualified for the team final in fourth place, but they finished eighth in the final after several mistakes.

Baumann was an alternate for Switzerland's team for the 2024 Summer Olympics. He announced his retirement from the sport in September 2024.

== Eponymous skill ==
In April 2017, the Technical Committee of the International Gymnastics Federation officially included a skill named after Baumann as a scoring element in the Code of Points. At the 2017 Doha World Cup, he performed the element for the first time in a competition.

Apparatus	Name	Description	Difficulty	Added to Code of Points
Parallel Bars	Baumann	Giant Swing bwd. to Makuts	F (0.6)	World Cup Doha

== Competitive history ==
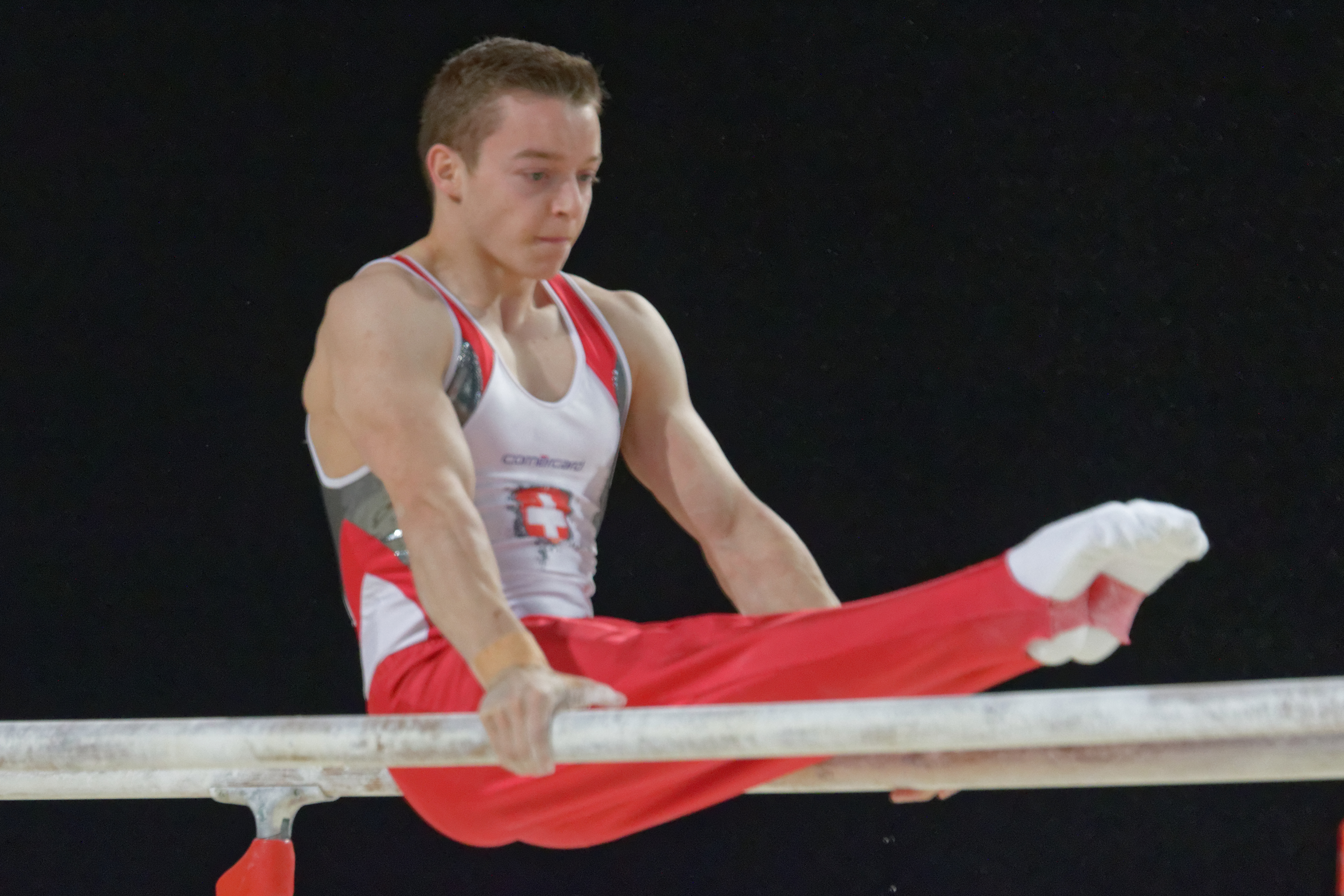
Baumann competing at the 2015 European Championships

Competitive history of Christian Baumann
Year	Event	Team	AA	FX	PH	SR	VT	PB	HB
Junior
2009	Swiss Junior Championships		16						
2010	Swiss Junior Championships		1st place, gold medalist(s)	1st place, gold medalist(s)	1st place, gold medalist(s)	1st place, gold medalist(s)	6	3rd place, bronze medalist(s)	2nd place, silver medalist(s)
2010	25th International Youth Cup		3rd place, bronze medalist(s)		1st place, gold medalist(s)	2nd place, silver medalist(s)	6	2nd place, silver medalist(s)	6
2011	International Junior Team Cup	2nd place, silver medalist(s)	6						
2011	Swiss Junior Championships		4	6	5	3rd place, bronze medalist(s)			4
2011	European Youth Olympic Festival	3rd place, bronze medalist(s)	4				3rd place, bronze medalist(s)		1st place, gold medalist(s)
2011	Art Gymnastics	1st place, gold medalist(s)	2nd place, silver medalist(s)						
2012	International Junior Team Cup	1st place, gold medalist(s)	2nd place, silver medalist(s)						
2012	Swiss Championships		7	4	4				
2012	Swiss Team Championships	1st place, gold medalist(s)							
2012	European Championships	3rd place, bronze medalist(s)	19						5
Senior
2013	Swiss Championships		6			3rd place, bronze medalist(s)			2nd place, silver medalist(s)
2013	Swiss Team Championships	1st place, gold medalist(s)							
2014	Swiss Championships		4		5	4		3rd place, bronze medalist(s)	4
2014	Swiss Team Championships	2nd place, silver medalist(s)							
2014	World Championships	7							
2015	Austrian Team Open	2nd place, silver medalist(s)	3rd place, bronze medalist(s)						
2015	Cottbus World Cup							5	
2015	European Championships		8					2nd place, silver medalist(s)	
2015	Swiss Championships		6		2nd place, silver medalist(s)	2nd place, silver medalist(s)		1st place, gold medalist(s)	
2015	Swiss Team Championships	2nd place, silver medalist(s)							
2015	World Championships	6	15						
2016	Länderkampf CH / FR / GBR / GER	2nd place, silver medalist(s)	10						
2016	European Championships	3rd place, bronze medalist(s)			3rd place, bronze medalist(s)			6	5
2016	Olympic Games	9							
2017
2017	European Championships				19			13	
2017	Doha World Cup								3rd place, bronze medalist(s)
2017	Swiss Team Championships	2nd place, silver medalist(s)							
2017	Swiss Championships		7						
2018	Swiss Championships		3rd place, bronze medalist(s)					1st place, gold medalist(s)	3rd place, bronze medalist(s)
2018	Swiss Team Championships	1st place, gold medalist(s)							
2018	World Championships	6							
2019	American Cup		6					2nd place, silver medalist(s)	
2019	Birmingham World Cup		8						
2019	European Championships		17					6	
2019	Magglingen Men’s Friendly	1st place, gold medalist(s)	6						
2019	Swiss Championships		4		2nd place, silver medalist(s)	3rd place, bronze medalist(s)		2nd place, silver medalist(s)	
2019	World Championships	7							
2019	Swiss Team Championships	1st place, gold medalist(s)							
2021
2021	European Championships		23					3rd place, bronze medalist(s)	6
2021	1st Swiss Men’s Olympic Trials		4		3rd place, bronze medalist(s)	1st place, gold medalist(s)			1st place, gold medalist(s)
2021	2nd Swiss Men’s Olympic Trials		2nd place, silver medalist(s)		3rd place, bronze medalist(s)	3rd place, bronze medalist(s)		3rd place, bronze medalist(s)	1st place, gold medalist(s)
2021	3rd Swiss Men’s Olympic Trials		1st place, gold medalist(s)			1st place, gold medalist(s)		1st place, gold medalist(s)	1st place, gold medalist(s)
2021	Swiss Championships		4	1st place, gold medalist(s)		2nd place, silver medalist(s)			
2021	Magglingen Men's Friendly		3rd place, bronze medalist(s)		2nd place, silver medalist(s)	1st place, gold medalist(s)		1st place, gold medalist(s)	3rd place, bronze medalist(s)
2021	Olympic Games	6							
2021	Swiss Team Championships	1st place, gold medalist(s)							
2021	World Championships							8	
2023	Varna World Challenge Cup					5			4
2023	World Championships	5							
2023	Swiss Cup	8							
2024	Rheintal Cup		3rd place, bronze medalist(s)						
2024	European Championships	8							
2024	Swiss Championships							2nd place, silver medalist(s)	2nd place, silver medalist(s)
2024	Swiss Cup	2nd place, silver medalist(s)							
