= Gymnastics at the 2020 Summer Olympics – Men's artistic team all-around =

Men's artistic team all-around at the Games of the XXXII Olympiad
- Venue: Ariake Gymnastics Centre
- Date: 26 July 2021
- Competitors: 32 from 8 nations
- Winning total: 262.500 points

Medalists
1st place, gold medalist(s)		Denis Ablyazin; David Belyavskiy; Artur Dalaloyan; Nikita Nagornyy	ROC
2nd place, silver medalist(s)		Daiki Hashimoto; Kazuma Kaya; Takeru Kitazono; Wataru Tanigawa	Japan
3rd place, bronze medalist(s)		Lin Chaopan; Sun Wei; Xiao Ruoteng; Zou Jingyuan	China

The men's artistic team all-around event at the 2020 Summer Olympics was held on 26 July 2021 at the Ariake Gymnastics Centre.

After qualifications, where Japan, China, and the ROC were separated by only three tenths of a point, ROC narrowly won the competition by a tenth of a point over host nation Japan in silver medal position. It is ROC's first title since the 1996 Summer Olympics, when they competed as Russia. China repeated their bronze medal finish from the 2016 Summer Olympics.

After the ROC women won the team all-around title the following day, ROC became the first nation to win both the men's and women's team all-around titles at the same Olympics since China did so at the 2008 Summer Olympics.

The medals for the competition were presented by Emma Terho, Finland; IOC Member, and the medalists' bouquets were presented by Morinari Watanabe, Japan; FIG President.

== Qualified teams ==
To reach the Olympics, a National Olympic Committee had to earn one of 12 team quota places. These were allocated through the 2018 World Artistic Gymnastics Championships (top three teams) and the 2019 World Artistic Gymnastics Championships (top nine teams, excluding those qualified in 2018). Those 12 teams competed in the qualification round in Tokyo on 24 July, with the top eight advancing to the final.

The following teams qualified for the Olympics by achieving a top three placement at the 2018 World Artistic Gymnastics Championships:

- China
- ROC
- Japan

The following teams qualified for the event by achieving a top nine placement among non-qualified teams at the 2019 World Artistic Gymnastics Championships:

- Ukraine
- Great Britain
- Switzerland
- United States
- Chinese Taipei
- South Korea
- Brazil
- Spain
- Germany

== Schedule ==
Date	Time	Round	Subdivision
24 July	10:00	Qualification	Subdivision 1
24 July	14:30	Qualification	Subdivision 2
24 July	19:30	Qualification	Subdivision 3
26 July	19:00	Final	–
All times are local time (UTC+09:00).

== Qualifications ==
The top eight teams in qualifications, based on combined scores of each apparatus, advanced to the final. In the final, each team selected three gymnasts to compete on each apparatus. All scores on each apparatus were summed to give a final team score. The scores in qualification did not carry over to the final.

Rank	Team	Floor (gymnastics)	Pommel horse	Rings (gymnastics)	Vault (gymnastics)	Parallel bars	Horizontal bar	Total
1	Japan	43.832	43.515	42.532	43.232	45.641	43.499	262.251
2	China	43.165	43.733	41.866	44.132	46.699	42.466	262.061
3	ROC	43.066	42.899	43.633	44.258	45.524	42.565	261.945
4	United States	44.065	41.866	42.099	42.799	44.766	41.166	256.761
5	Great Britain	42.598	43.666	41.499	42.766	44.666	41.399	256.594
6	Germany	40.432	41.499	40.866	42.133	44.666	40.333	249.929
7	Switzerland	42.232	40.099	40.765	42.065	44.966	39.066	249.193
8	Ukraine	40.332	39.498	41.198	42.532	44.299	39.633	247.492

== Final ==
Rank	Team	Floor (gymnastics)	Pommel horse	Rings (gymnastics)	Vault (gymnastics)	Parallel bars	Horizontal bar	Total
1st place, gold medalist(s)	ROC	42.632 (2)	43.140 (4)	44.399 (1)	44.765 (1)	45.099 (2)	42.465 (4)	262.500
1st place, gold medalist(s)	Denis Ablyazin (ROC)	13.900		15.033	14.866			262.500
1st place, gold medalist(s)	David Belyavskiy (ROC)		14.841			15.333	14.166	262.500
1st place, gold medalist(s)	Artur Dalaloyan (ROC)	14.066	13.833	14.666	14.933	14.600	13.933	262.500
1st place, gold medalist(s)	Nikita Nagornyy (ROC)	14.666	14.466	14.700	14.966	15.166	14.366	262.500
2nd place, silver medalist(s)	Japan	43.700 (1)	43.566 (3)	42.433 (3)	44.232 (3)	44.666 (3)	43.800 (1)	262.397
2nd place, silver medalist(s)	Daiki Hashimoto (JPN)	14.600	14.800	13.833	14.833		15.100	262.397
2nd place, silver medalist(s)	Kazuma Kaya (JPN)		14.566	14.100		15.000	14.200	262.397
2nd place, silver medalist(s)	Takeru Kitazono (JPN)	14.600	14.200		14.166	15.000	14.500	262.397
2nd place, silver medalist(s)	Wataru Tanigawa (JPN)	14.500		14.500	15.233	14.666		262.397
3rd place, bronze medalist(s)	China	42.132 (4)	43.966 (1)	43.599 (2)	44.332 (2)	45.199 (1)	42.666 (3)	261.894
3rd place, bronze medalist(s)	Lin Chaopan (CHN)	13.166			14.733		14.133	261.894
3rd place, bronze medalist(s)	Sun Wei (CHN)	14.366	15.000	14.233	14.866	14.800	14.200	261.894
3rd place, bronze medalist(s)	Xiao Ruoteng (CHN)	14.600	14.166	14.366	14.733	14.933	14.333	261.894
3rd place, bronze medalist(s)	Zou Jingyuan (CHN)		14.800	15.000		15.466		261.894
4	Great Britain	42.432 (3)	43.632 (2)	41.833 (5)	43.032 (4)	42.932 (6)	41.899 (5)	255.760
4	Joe Fraser (GBR)	13.866	14.666	14.500	14.133	14.666	14.333	255.760
4	James Hall (GBR)	14.033	14.000	13.600	14.233	13.100	14.200	255.760
4	Giarnni Regini-Moran (GBR)	14.533		13.733	14.666	15.166		255.760
4	Max Whitlock (GBR)		14.966				13.366	255.760
5	United States	39.965 (7)	42.099 (5)	42.166 (4)	42.899 (5)	44.266 (4)	43.199 (2)	254.594
5	Brody Malone (USA)		14.000	14.100	14.233		14.633	254.594
5	Sam Mikulak (USA)	12.133	13.733		14.466	15.000	14.566	254.594
5	Yul Moldauer (USA)	14.366	14.366	13.900	14.200	14.566		254.594
5	Shane Wiskus (USA)	13.466		14.166		14.700	14.000	254.594
6	Switzerland	42.066 (5)	41.099 (6)	40.298 (8)	41.999 (7)	44.066 (5)	41.399 (6)	250.927
6	Christian Baumann (SUI)			13.166		14.600	13.966	250.927
6	Pablo Brägger (SUI)	14.233	13.400	13.466	13.833	14.833	13.933	250.927
6	Benjamin Gischard (SUI)	14.000	13.866		14.000			250.927
6	Eddy Yusof (SUI)	13.833	13.833	13.666	14.166	14.633	13.500	250.927
7	Ukraine	41.232 (6)	39.999 (7)	40.866 (6)	41.499 (8)	42.233 (8)	40.565 (7)	246.394
7	Illia Kovtun (UKR)	13.800	14.200			13.233	14.433	246.394
7	Petro Pakhniuk (UKR)	13.466	12.266	12.533	13.233	15.200	13.466	246.394
7	Igor Radivilov (UKR)			14.633	14.600			246.394
7	Yevgen Yudenkov (UKR)	13.966	13.533	13.700	13.666	13.800	12.666	246.394
8	Germany	34.832 (8)	39.200 (8)	40.333 (7)	42.366 (6)	42.765 (7)	38.999 (8)	238.495
8	Lukas Dauser (GER)	11.500	12.100		13.700	15.466	13.600	238.495
8	Nils Dunkel (GER)		13.700	13.600		12.733	13.033	238.495
8	Philipp Herder (GER)	11.866		13.200	14.333	14.566		238.495
8	Andreas Toba (GER)	11.466	13.400	13.533	14.333		12.366	238.495
