= Benjamin Gischard =

Swiss artistic gymnast (born 1995)

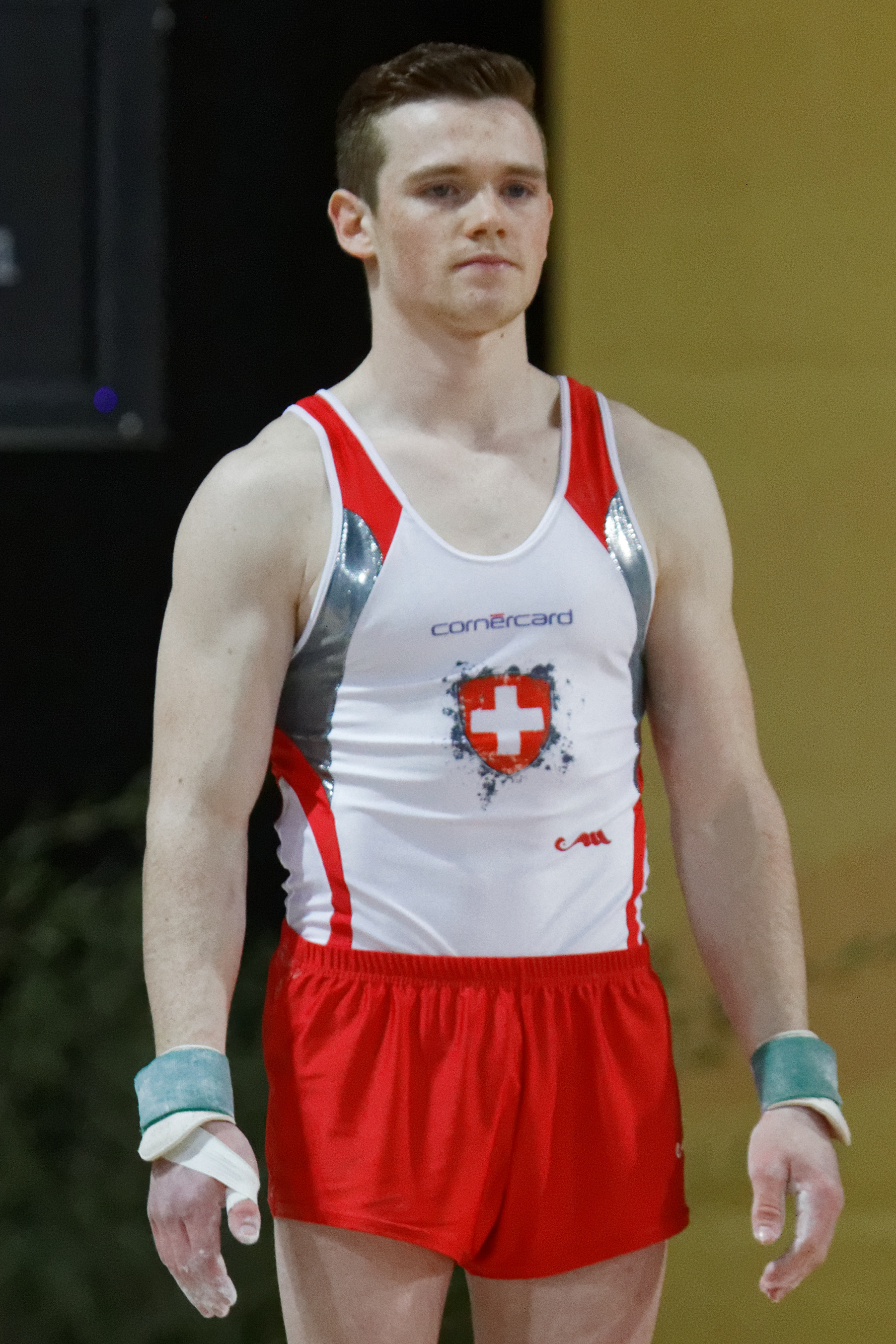
- Gischard at the 2015 European Championships

Personal information
- Full name: Benjamin Manuel Gischard
- Born: 17 November 1995 (age 30) Zurich, Switzerland
- Height: 1.62 m (5 ft 4 in)

Gymnastics career
- Discipline: Men's artistic gymnastics
- Country represented: Switzerland (2014–2025)
- Training location: Magglingen, Switzerland
- Club: TV Herzogenbuchsee
- Head coach: Bernhard Fluck
Medal record
Men's artistic gymnastics
Representing Switzerland
European Championships
Silver medal – second place	2021 Basel	Floor exercise
Bronze medal – third place	2016 Bern	Team

Benjamin Manuel Gischard (born 17 November 1995) is a Swiss retired artistic gymnast. He is the 2021 European floor exercise silver medalist and a 2016 European team bronze medalist. He competed at the 2016 and 2020 Summer Olympics.

== Gymnastics career ==
Gischard began gymnastics at the age of five after seeing the sport on TV.

Gischard competed at his first World Championships in 2014 with the Swiss team that placed seventh in the team final. He advanced into the vault final at the 2015 European Championships and placed sixth.

Gischard won a bronze medal on the vault at the 2016 Cottbus World Challenge Cup. He then won a bronze medal with the Swiss team at the 2016 European Championships. He was selected to represent Switzerland at the 2016 Summer Olympics where the team finished ninth in the qualification round for the 2016 Summer Olympics, making them the first reserve for the final.

At the 2018 Koper World Challenge Cup, Gischard won bronze medals on both the vault and the floor exercise. Then at the 2018 European Championships, the Swiss team qualified for the team final, finishing fifth. He competed with the Swiss team that finished sixth at the 2018 World Championships.

Gischard placed fourth in the floor exercise and fifth in the vault at the 2019 European Championships. At the 2019 World Championships, he helped Switzerland advance into the team final and earn an Olympic berth.

Gischard won the silver medal on the floor exercise at the 2021 European Championships. He had shoulder surgery in September 2021 and missed the 2021 World Championships. He represented Switzerland at the postponed 2020 Summer Olympics alongside Christian Baumann, Pablo Brägger, and Eddy Yusof. They qualified for the team final for the first time since 1984 and finished sixth. Individually, he advanced into the all-around final and placed 13th.

Gischard tore his meniscus in September 2023 and tore it again eight months later. He was not able to compete at the 2024 Summer Olympics due to the injury. He announced his retirement in 2025.

== Personal life ==
Gischard studied law at the UniDistance Suisse.
