= Pablo Brägger =

Swiss artistic gymnast (born 1992)

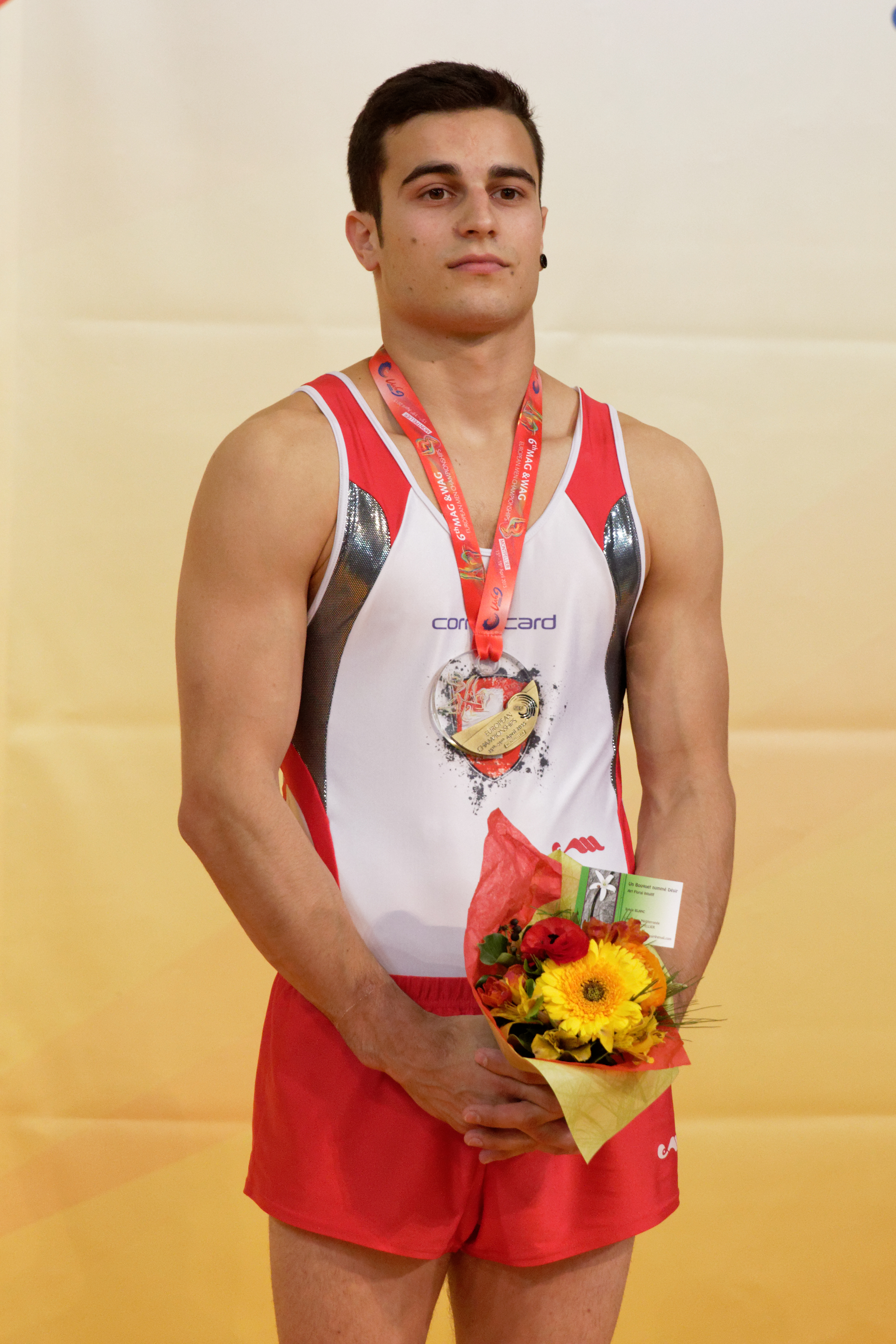
- Brägger at the 2015 European Championships

Personal information
- Full name: Pablo Dominic Brägger
- Born: 27 November 1992 (age 33) Oberbüren, Switzerland
- Height: 1.69 m (5 ft 7 in)

Gymnastics career
- Discipline: Men's artistic gymnastics
- Country represented: Switzerland (2009–2021)
- Retired: 2021
Medal record
Men's artistic gymnastics
Representing Switzerland
European Championships
Gold medal – first place	2017 Cluj-Napoca	Horizontal bar
Bronze medal – third place	2015 Montpellier	Floor exercise
Bronze medal – third place	2016 Bern	Team
FIG World Cup
Event	1st	2nd	3rd
Apparatus World Cup	0	1	1
World Challenge Cup	1	0	0
Total	1	1	1

Pablo Dominic Brägger (born 27 November 1992) is a Swiss former artistic gymnast. He is the 2017 European champion on the horizontal bar. He won a bronze medal on the floor exercise at the 2015 European Championships and a bronze medal in the team event at the 2016 European Championships. He competed at the 2016 and 2020 Summer Olympics, retiring from elite sport after his second Olympic Games.

== Gymnastics career ==
Brägger began gymnastics when he was eight years old.

=== Junior ===
Brägger competed alongside Oliver Hegi and Michael Meier at the 2009 European Youth Olympic Festival, and they won the team silver medal behind Russia. Individually, he won bronze medals on the floor exercise and the vault. At the 2010 European Championships, he won a bronze medal in the all-around behind British gymnasts Sam Oldham and Max Whitlock.

=== Senior ===
==== 2012–2014 ====
Brägger competed with the Swiss team that finished seventh at the 2012 European Championships. He advanced into the all-around final at the 2013 World Championships and finished 16th. He missed most of the 2014 season due to an elbow injury.

==== 2015–2016 ====
At the 2015 Cottbus World Challenge Cup, Brägger tied with Ümit Şamiloğlu for the gold medal on the horizontal bar. He won a bronze medal on the floor exercise at the 2015 European Championships, behind Kristian Thomas and David Belyavskiy. He helped the Swiss team finish sixth in the team final at the 2015 World Championships and win an Olympic berth. He qualified for the individual all-around final and finished 13th.

Brägger finished sixth in the all-around at the 2016 AT&T American Cup. Then at the 2016 European Championships, he helped the Swiss team win the bronze medal. He was selected to represent Switzerland at the 2016 Summer Olympics where the team finished ninth in the qualification round for the 2016 Summer Olympics, making them the first reserve for the final. He did advance into the all-around final and finished 16th.

==== 2017–2018 ====
Brägger won a bronze medal on the parallel bars at the 2017 Doha World Cup. Then at the 2017 European Championships, he won the gold medal on the horizontal bar. He advanced into the horizontal bar final at the 2017 World Championships and finished fourth. He also competed in the all-around final and finished 12th. He had knee surgery in November 2017 to fix an ongoing injury. He returned for the 2018 World Championships and finished sixth with the Swiss team and 21st in the all-around final.

==== 2019–2021 ====
Brägger won a silver medal on the floor exercise at the 2019 Baku World Cup. He missed the 2019 European Championships due to a knee injury. He returned for the 2019 World Championships and helped Switzerland advance into the team final and earn an Olympic berth. Individually, he advanced into the all-around final and finished 15th.

Brägger competed at the 2020 American Cup and finished sixth in the all-around. He was scheduled to compete at the Tokyo World Cup taking place on 4 April. However, the Tokyo World Cup was later canceled due to the coronavirus outbreak in Japan. At the 2021 European Championships, he finished fifth in the all-around, seventh in the parallel bars, and seventh in the horizontal bar.

Brägger represented Switzerland at the postponed 2020 Summer Olympics alongside Christian Baumann, Benjamin Gischard, and Eddy Yusof. They qualified for the team final for the first time since 1984 and finished sixth. He announced his retirement from the sport in September 2021.
