= Nick Klessing =

German artistic gymnast

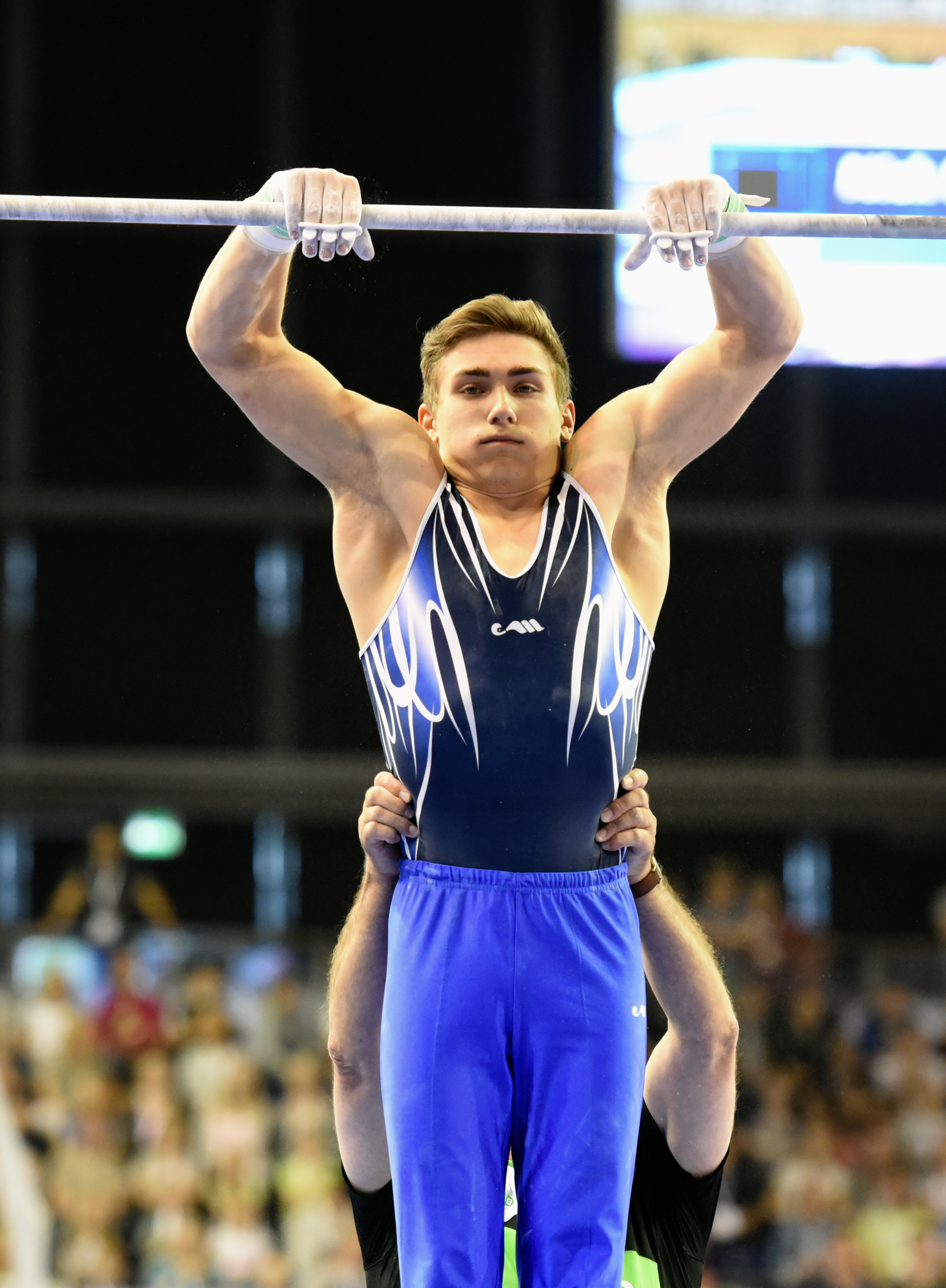
- Klessing in 2017

Personal information
- Born: 14 January 1998 (age 28)

Gymnastics career
- Discipline: Men's artistic gymnastics
- Country represented: Germany
Medal record
Men's artistic gymnastics
Representing Germany
European Championships
Gold medal – first place	2016 Bern	Rings (junior)

Nick Klessing (born 14 January 1998) is a German artistic gymnast. He competed at both the 2018 World Artistic Gymnastics Championships in Doha, Qatar and 2019 World Artistic Gymnastics Championships in Stuttgart, Germany. In 2019, he finished in 8th place in the rings.

In 2016, he won the gold medal in the junior rings event at the European Men's Artistic Gymnastics Championships held in Bern, Switzerland.
