= Andrey Makolov =

Russian artistic gymnast

- Full name: Andrey Gennadyevich Makolov
- Born: 12 June 1998 (age 28) Tolyatti, Samara Oblast, Russia

Gymnastics career
- Discipline: Men's artistic gymnastics
- Country represented: Russia (2013–present)
- Club: Olympus Tolyatti
- Head coach: Andrei Radionenko
- Assistant coaches: Evgeny Nikolko, A. Shestakova, O.A. Yarygin, P.V. Denisov
Medal record
Men's artistic gymnastics
Representing Russia
European Junior Championships
Gold medal – first place	2016 Bern	Vault
Gold medal – first place	2016 Bern	Horizontal Bar
Silver medal – second place	2016 Bern	All-Around
Silver medal – second place	2016 Bern	Floor
Silver medal – second place	2016 Bern	Team

Andrey Gennadyevich Makolov (Russian: Андрей Геннадьевич Маколов, born 12 June 1998) is a Russian artistic gymnast. He is the 2016 European Junior All-around silver medalist and vault and horizontal bar champion. He is also the 2015 Russian Junior All-around national champion.

== Career ==
=== Junior ===
Makolov became member of the Russian junior team in 2013, he competed in the prestigious national competition Alexei Nemov Cup. In 2014, he competed at the Hope of Russia winning gold in the all-around, floor, vault and silver medals in pommel horse, rings and parallel bars.

In 2015, Makolov became Russian Junior All-around champion, he also won gold in Team, rings, vault, finished 4th in high bar and 8th in parallel bars. He also competed at the 2015 Russian Summer Student Games winning gold in all-around, floor, rings and vault. He sustained an injury and spend time on recovery in the end of the season.

In 2016, recovering from injury; Makolov joined the senior division representing Volga Federal District where they won Team gold at the 2016 Russian Artistic Gymnastics Championships. On May 25–29, Makolov competed at the 2016 European Junior Championships where Russia won silver in Team event, he also won silver in the all-around behind Britain's Giarnni Regini-Moran. In the apparatus finals, Makolov won gold in vault and horizontal bar, silver in floor, 7th in pommel horse, 5th in parallel bars, and 8th in rings.

In 2017, Makolov suffered an injury and sat out in international competitions. On August 23–27, Makolov returned to a national competition at the Russian Cup where he finished 9th in the all-around and won bronze in team event. In the apparatus finals: he finished 7th on rings.
