= 2015 European Artistic Gymnastics Championships =

6th European Men's and Women's Artistic Gymnastics Individual Championships
- Venue: Park&Suites Arena
- Location: Montpellier, France
- Start date: 15 April 2015
- End date: 19 April 2015
- Nations: Members of the European Union of Gymnastics

The 6th European Men's and Women's Artistic Gymnastics Individual Championships was held from 15 to 19 April 2015 at the Park&Suites Arena in Montpellier, France. As usual in this format, no team competitions took place.

== Schedule ==
All times are in Central European Time (UTC+01:00).

Wednesday, 15 April 2015

- 10:30 – 21:30 WAG Qualifying

Thursday, 16 April 2015

- 10:30 – 21:00 MAG Qualifying

Friday, 17 April 2015

- 13:00 – 14:00 WAG All-Around Final
- 14:30 – 17:00 MAG All-Around Final

Saturday, 18 April 2015

- 14:30 – 17:30 Apparatus Finals Day 1

Sunday, 19 April 2015

- 14:30 – 17:30 Apparatus Finals Day 2

== Venue ==
The competition took place in the Park&Suites Arena. The training and warm up halls was in the same building. The arena hosted the 2011 World Rhythmic Gymnastics Championships.

== Participating nations ==
Each nation is allowed to send 6 men and 4 women. All nations that want to participate must be members of the European Union of Gymnastics. The following is based on the nominative roster.

- Armenia (7)
- Austria (5)
- Azerbaijan (8)
- Belgium (6)
- Belarus (7)
- Bulgaria (5)
- Croatia (6)
- Cyprus (4)
- Czech Republic (6)
- Denmark (8)
- Finland (8)
- France (10)
- Great Britain (10)
- Georgia (3)
- Germany (10)
- Greece (10)
- Hungary (8)
- Ireland (8)
- Iceland (8)
- Israel (8)
- Italy (10)
- Latvia (8)
- Lithuania (6)
- Luxembourg (1)
- Monaco (1)
- Netherlands (10)
- Norway (7)
- Poland (5)
- Portugal (4)
- Romania (10)
- Russia (10)
- Slovenia (8)
- Spain (10)
- Switzerland (10)
- Slovakia (2)
- Sweden (7)
- Turkey (9)
- Ukraine (8)

== Medalists ==
Event	Gold	Silver	Bronze
Men
All-around	Oleg Verniaiev (UKR)	David Belyavskiy (RUS)	Daniel Purvis (GBR)
Floor	Kristian Thomas (GBR)	David Belyavskiy (RUS)	Pablo Brägger (SUI)
Pommel horse	Louis Smith (GBR)	Harutyun Merdinyan (ARM)	Alberto Busnari (ITA)
Rings	Eleftherios Petrounias (GRE)	Denis Ablyazin (RUS); Samir Aït Saïd (FRA)	—
Vault	Nikita Nagornyy (RUS)	Denis Ablyazin (RUS); Igor Radivilov (UKR)	—
Parallel bars	Oleg Verniaiev (UKR)	Christian Baumann (SUI); Marius Berbecar (ROU)	—
Horizontal bar	Marijo Možnik (CRO)	Sam Oldham (GBR)	Vlasios Maras (GRE)
Women
All-around	Giulia Steingruber (SUI)	Maria Kharenkova (RUS)	Ellie Downie (GBR)
Vault	Maria Paseka (RUS)	Giulia Steingruber (SUI)	Ksenia Afanasyeva (RUS)
Uneven bars	Daria Spiridonova (RUS)	Becky Downie (GBR)	Sanne Wevers (NED)
Balance beam	Andreea Munteanu (ROU)	Becky Downie (GBR)	Claire Martin (FRA)
Floor	Ksenia Afanasyeva (RUS)	Claudia Fragapane (GBR)	Giulia Steingruber (SUI)

== Women's results ==
=== Individual All-around ===
Oldest and youngest competitors

	Name	Country	Date of birth	Age
Youngest	Laura Jurca	Romania	14 September 1999	15 years, 7 months and 3 days
Oldest	Marta Pihan-Kulesza	Poland	23 July 1987	27 years, 8 months and 25 days

Rank	Gymnast	Vault (gymnastics)	Uneven bars	Balance beam	Floor (gymnastics)	Total
1st place, gold medalist(s)	Giulia Steingruber (SUI)	15.266	13.666	14.375	14.566	57.873
2nd place, silver medalist(s)	Maria Kharenkova (RUS)	13.933	14.066	15.000	14.133	57.132
3rd place, bronze medalist(s)	Ellie Downie (GBR)	14.833	14.233	13.891	13.666	56.623
4	Erika Fasana (ITA)	14.533	13.500	13.941	14.500	56.474
5	Marta Pihan-Kulesza (POL)	13.733	13.966	13.333	14.166	55.198
6	Claudia Fragapane (GBR)	14.533	13.400	12.433	14.533	54.899
7	Laura Jurca (ROU)	14.766	12.866	13.500	13.733	54.865
8	Ana Filipa Martins (POR)	13.833	13.733	13.300	13.833	54.699
9	Martina Rizzelli (ITA)	14.333	13.900	13.100	13.333	54.666
10	Diana Bulimar (ROU)	13.766	13.533	13.666	13.666	54.631
11	Loan His (FRA)	13.958	13.966	12.666	13.533	54.123
12	Eythora Thorsdottir (NED)	13.700	13.966	13.466	12.666	53.798
13	Daria Spiridonova (RUS)	13.700	15.350	12.166	12.300	53.516
14	Ana Pérez (ESP)	13.766	12.966	13.466	12.466	52.664
15	Ainhoa Carmona (ESP)	13.600	12.700	13.266	12.500	52.066
16	Claire Martin (FRA)	12.700	11.666	13.766	13.833	51.965
17	Barbora Mokošová (SVK)	13.700	12.900	12.700	12.566	51.866
18	Pauline Tratz (GER)	13.900	11.800	12.500	13.266	51.466
19	Houry Gebeshian (ARM)	13.633	12.666	12.266	12.633	51.198
20	Dyonnailys Supriana (NED)	13.500	12.766	11.700	13.100	51.066
21	Jessica Diacci (SUI)	12.600	12.066	13.300	12.933	50.899
22	Kitti Honti (HUN)	13.266	12.733	11.566	12.600	50.165
23	Krystyna Sankova (UKR)	13.800	11.300	10.833	13.433	49.366
24	Jonna Adlerteg (SWE)	–	–	–	11.166	11.166

- Adlerteg was injured performing her floor routine and was unable to continue competition.

=== Vault ===
Oldest and youngest competitors

	Name	Country	Date of birth	Age
Youngest	Camille Bahl	France	13 October 1999	15 years, 6 months and 5 days
Oldest	Ksenia Afanasyeva	Russia	13 September 1991	23 years, 7 months and 5 days

Rank	Gymnast	D Score	E Score	Pen.	Score 1	D Score	E Score	Pen.	Score 2	Total
1st place, gold medalist(s)	Maria Paseka (RUS)	6.4	8.700		15.100	6.3	9.100		15.400	15.250
2nd place, silver medalist(s)	Giulia Steingruber (SUI)	6.2	9.133		15.333	5.8	9.166		14.966	15.149
3rd place, bronze medalist(s)	Ksenia Afanasyeva (RUS)	6.3	9.033	0.1	15.233	5.6	9.000	0.1	14.500	14.866
4	Noël van Klaveren (NED)	5.8	8.900		14.700	5.6	8.866		14.466	14.583
5	Ellie Downie (GBR)	5.8	9.033		14.833	5.2	9.000		14.200	14.516
6	Claudia Fragapane (GBR)	5.8	8.766	0.1	14.466	5.2	8.500		13.700	14.083
7	Camille Bahl (FRA)	5.8	9.000		14.800	4.6	8.733		13.333	14.066
8	Teja Belak (SLO)	5.8	7.566		13.366	5.3	7.766		13.066	13.216
Rank	Gymnast	Vault 1				Vault 2				Total

=== Uneven bars ===
Oldest and youngest competitors

	Name	Country	Date of birth	Age
Youngest	Ellie Downie	Great Britain	20 July 1999	15 years, 8 months and 29 days
Oldest	Sanne Wevers	Netherlands	17 September 1991	23 years, 7 months and 1 day

Position	Gymnast	D Score	E Score	Penalty	Total
1st place, gold medalist(s)	Daria Spiridonova (RUS)	6.7	8.766		15.466
2nd place, silver medalist(s)	Becky Downie (GBR)	6.7	8.533		15.233
3rd place, bronze medalist(s)	Sanne Wevers (NED)	5.6	8.600		14.200
4	Ellie Downie (GBR)	5.9	8.200		14.100
5	Martina Rizzelli (ITA)	6.0	7.933		13.933
6	Giulia Steingruber (SUI)	5.7	8.066		13.766
7	Maria Kharenkova (RUS)	6.1	7.333		13.433
8	Loan His (FRA)	5.8	5.866		11.666

=== Balance beam ===
Oldest and youngest competitors

	Name	Country	Date of birth	Age
Youngest	Maria Kharenkova	Russia	29 October 1998	16 years, 5 months and 21 days
Oldest	Vasiliki Millousi	Greece	4 May 1984	30 years, 11 months and 15 days

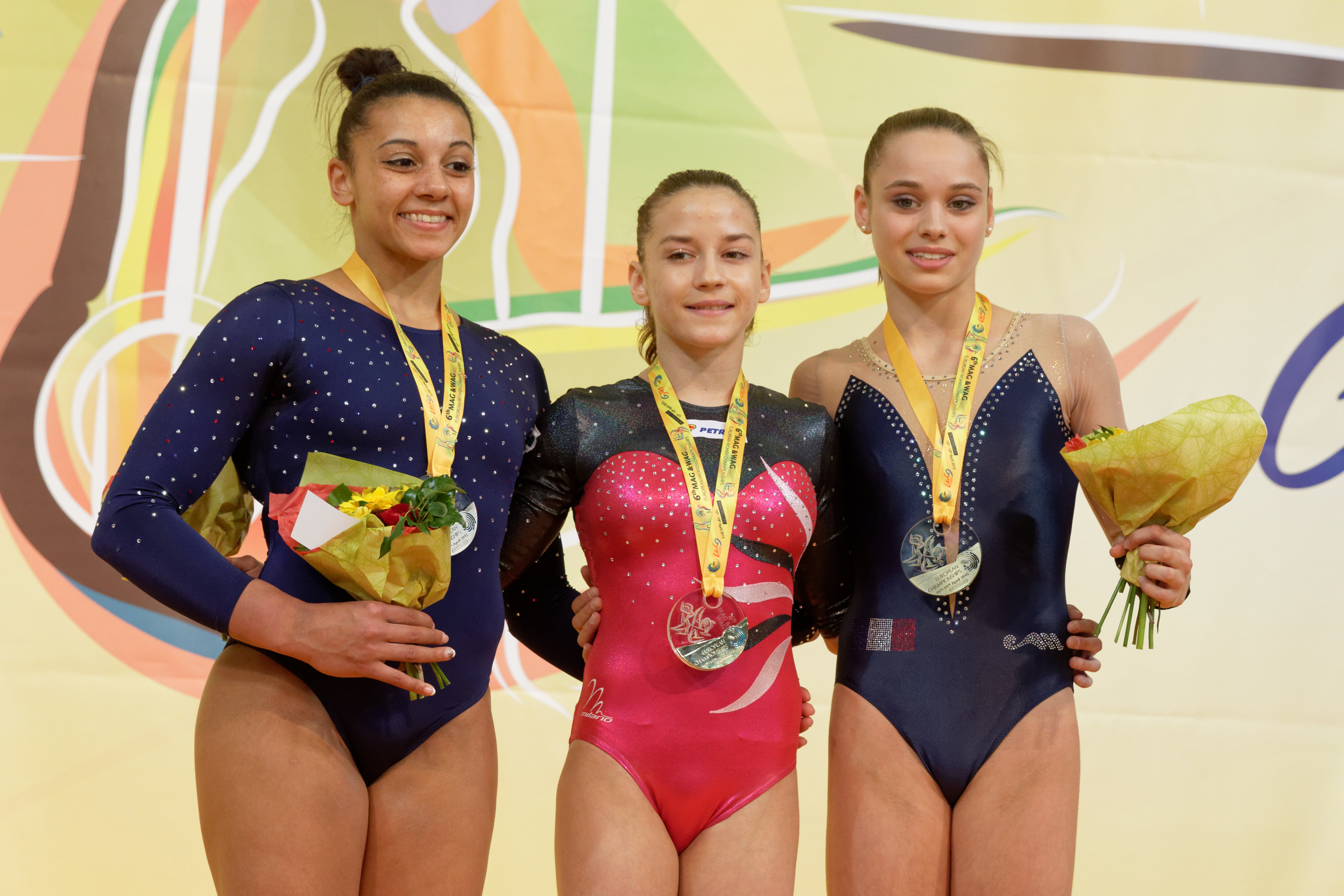
Medalists

Position	Gymnast	D Score	E Score	Penalty	Total
1st place, gold medalist(s)	Andreea Munteanu (ROU)	6.100	8.266		14.366
2nd place, silver medalist(s)	Becky Downie (GBR)	6.000	8.300		14.300
3rd place, bronze medalist(s)	Claire Martin (FRA)	5.800	8.400		14.200
4	Claudia Fragapane (GBR)	5.600	8.300		13.900
5	Vasiliki Millousi (GRE)	5.900	7.366		13.233
6	Maria Kharenkova (RUS)	5.600	7.600		13.200
7	Pauline Schäfer (GER)	5.700	7.400		13.100
8	Sanne Wevers (NED)	5.300	6.700		11.900

=== Floor ===
Oldest and youngest competitors

	Name	Country	Date of birth	Age
Youngest	Amy Tinkler	Great Britain	27 October 1999	15 years, 5 months and 23 days
Oldest	Marta Pihan-Kulesza	Poland	23 July 1987	27 years, 8 months and 27 days

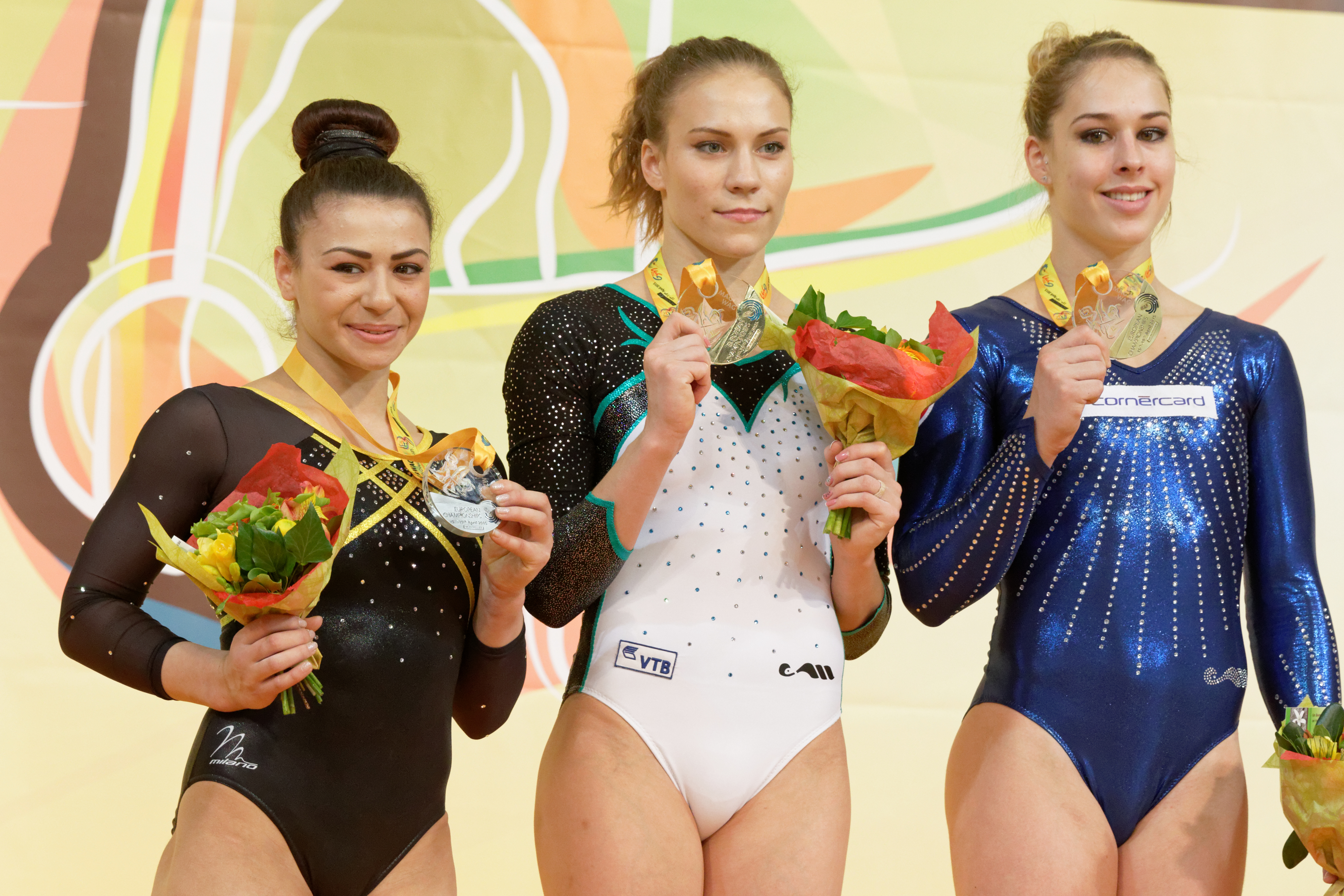
Medalists

Position	Gymnast	D Score	E Score	Penalty	Total
1st place, gold medalist(s)	Ksenia Afanasyeva (RUS)	6.300	8.433		14.733
2nd place, silver medalist(s)	Claudia Fragapane (GBR)	6.300	8.333		14.633
3rd place, bronze medalist(s)	Giulia Steingruber (SUI)	6.000	8.466		14.466
4	Erika Fasana (ITA)	6.000	8.300		14.300
5	Marta Pihan-Kulesza (POL)	6.000	8.233		14.233
6	Amy Tinkler (GBR)	5.900	8.100		14.000
7	Maria Kharenkova (RUS)	5.800	8.233	0.1	13.933
8	Andreea Munteanu (ROU)	5.500	8.366		13.866

== Men's results ==
=== Individual All-around ===
Oldest and youngest competitors

	Name	Country	Date of birth	Age
Youngest	Marios Georgiou	Cyprus	10 November 1997	17 years, 5 months and 7 days
Oldest	Dzmitry Barkalau	Belarus	23 February 1986	29 years, 1 month and 25 days

Rank	Gymnast	Floor (gymnastics)	Pommel horse	Rings (gymnastics)	Vault (gymnastics)	Parallel bars	Horizontal bar	Total
1st place, gold medalist(s)	Oleg Verniaiev (UKR)	14.400	15.000	15.233	14.933	16.116	13.900	89.582
2nd place, silver medalist(s)	David Belyavskiy (RUS)	14.900	13.566	14.533	15.100	15.566	14.466	88.131
3rd place, bronze medalist(s)	Daniel Purvis (GBR)	14.933	14.566	14.433	14.691	15.000	13.800	87.423
4	Artur Davtyan (ARM)	14.141	14.483	14.566	15.133	14.541	13.500	86.364
5	Oleg Stepko (AZE)	14.500	14.600	13.858	14.600	15.166	13.500	86.224
6	Sam Oldham (GBR)	14.766	14.666	13.966	14.566	13.433	14.791	86.188
7	Dzmitry Barkalau (BLR)	13.633	13.891	14.100	14.433	14.366	14.533	84.956
8	Christian Baumann (SUI)	14.266	13.866	14.066	13.958	14.933	13.866	84.955
9	Petro Pakhnyuk (AZE)	14.100	14.600	13.841	14.200	14.533	13.633	84.840
10	Claudio Capelli (SUI)	15.066	13.133	13.700	14.421	14.966	12.500	84.606
11	Nikolai Kuksenkov (RUS)	13.500	13.633	14.666	14.366	13.233	14.566	83.964
12	Nikolaos Iliopoulos (GRE)	13.900	13.966	13.466	14.300	14.566	13.733	83.931
13	Stian Skjerahaug (NOR)	14.200	14.300	13.108	14.466	14.100	13.433	83.607
14	Rokas Guščinas (LTU)	13.966	14.766	13.825	13.933	14.016	12.400	82.906
15	Mykyta Yermak (UKR)	14.200	13.966	13.166	14.066	14.533	12.966	82.897
16	Ludovico Edalli (ITA)	12.066	13.866	13.333	14.333	14.533	13.733	81.864
17	Karl Oskar Kirmes (FIN)	14.300	12.833	13.833	13.900	13.466	13.300	81.632
18	Alberto Tallón (ESP)	14.666	12.300	13.958	14.533	13.133	13.033	81.623
19	Marios Georgiou (CYP)	13.925	13.900	13.033	14.300	12.933	13.500	81.591
20	Axel Augis (FRA)	14.266	12.366	13.133	13.333	14.716	13.500	81.314
21	Maxime Gentges (BEL)	14.066	14.408	13.500	13.000	13.900	12.300	81.174
22	Artem Dolgopyat (ISR)	14.600	12.700	12.133	14.333	13.066	13.333	80.165
23	Tomas Kuzmickas (LTU)	14.233	11.400	13.066	14.200	13.433	13.366	79.698
24	Ferhat Arıcan (TUR)	12.300	12.708	11.950	14.766	13.366	13.266	78.356

=== Floor ===
Oldest and youngest competitors

	Name	Country	Date of birth	Age
Youngest	Andrej Korosteljev	Croatia	15 December 1995	19 years, 4 months and 3 days
Oldest	Tomislav Markovic	Croatia	31 January 1986	29 years, 2 months and 18 days

Position	Gymnast	D Score	E Score	Penalty	Total
1st place, gold medalist(s)	Kristian Thomas (GBR)	6.2	8.966		15.166
2nd place, silver medalist(s)	David Belyavskiy (RUS)	6.6	8.466		15.066
3rd place, bronze medalist(s)	Pablo Brägger (SUI)	6.5	8.541	0.1	14.941
4	Alexander Shatilov (ISR)	6.5	8.433		14.933
5	Rayderley Zapata (ESP)	6.7	8.300	0.1	14.900
6	Bart Deurloo (NED)	6.5	8.366		14.866
7	Tomislav Markovic (CRO)	6.3	7.433		13.733
8	Andrej Korosteljev (CRO)	6.4	6.333	0.3	12.433

=== Pommel horse ===
Oldest and youngest competitors

	Name	Country	Date of birth	Age
Youngest	Oleg Stepko	Azerbaijan	25 March 1994	21 years and 24 days
Oldest	Alberto Busnari	Italy	4 October 1978	36 years, 6 months and 14 days

Position	Gymnast	D Score	E Score	Penalty	Total
1st place, gold medalist(s)	Louis Smith (GBR)	6.9	8.900		15.800
2nd place, silver medalist(s)	Harutyun Merdinyan (ARM)	6.7	8.633		15.333
3rd place, bronze medalist(s)	Alberto Busnari (ITA)	6.8	8.400		15.200
4	Robert Seligman (CRO)	6.3	8.700		15.000
5	Vid Hidvégi (HUN)	6.6	8.300		14.900
6	Oleg Stepko (AZE)	6.5	8.166		14.666
7	Dmitrijs Trefilovs (LAT)	6.3	7.808		14.108
8	Matvei Petrov (RUS)	6.1	6.933		13.033

=== Rings ===
Oldest and youngest competitors

	Name	Country	Date of birth	Age
Youngest	Courtney Tulloch	Great Britain	6 October 1995	19 years, 6 months and 12 days
Oldest	Matteo Morandi	Italy	8 October 1981	33 years, 6 months and 10 days

Position	Gymnast	D Score	E Score	Penalty	Total
1st place, gold medalist(s)	Eleftherios Petrounias (GRE)	6.8	9.066		15.866
2nd place, silver medalist(s)	Samir Aït Saïd (FRA)	6.8	8.766		15.566
2nd place, silver medalist(s)	Denis Ablyazin (RUS)	6.8	8.766		15.566
4	Yuri van Gelder (NED)	6.8	8.733		15.533
5	Vahagn Davtyan (ARM)	6.6	8.733		15.333
6	Artur Tovmasyan (ARM)	6.7	8.600		15.300
6	Matteo Morandi (ITA)	6.7	8.600		15.300
8	Courtney Tulloch (GBR)	6.7	8.533		15.233

=== Vault ===
Oldest and youngest competitors

	Name	Country	Date of birth	Age
Youngest	Nikita Nagornyy	Russia	12 February 1997	18 years, 2 months and 7 days
Oldest	Matthias Fahrig	Germany	15 December 1985	29 years, 4 months and 4 days

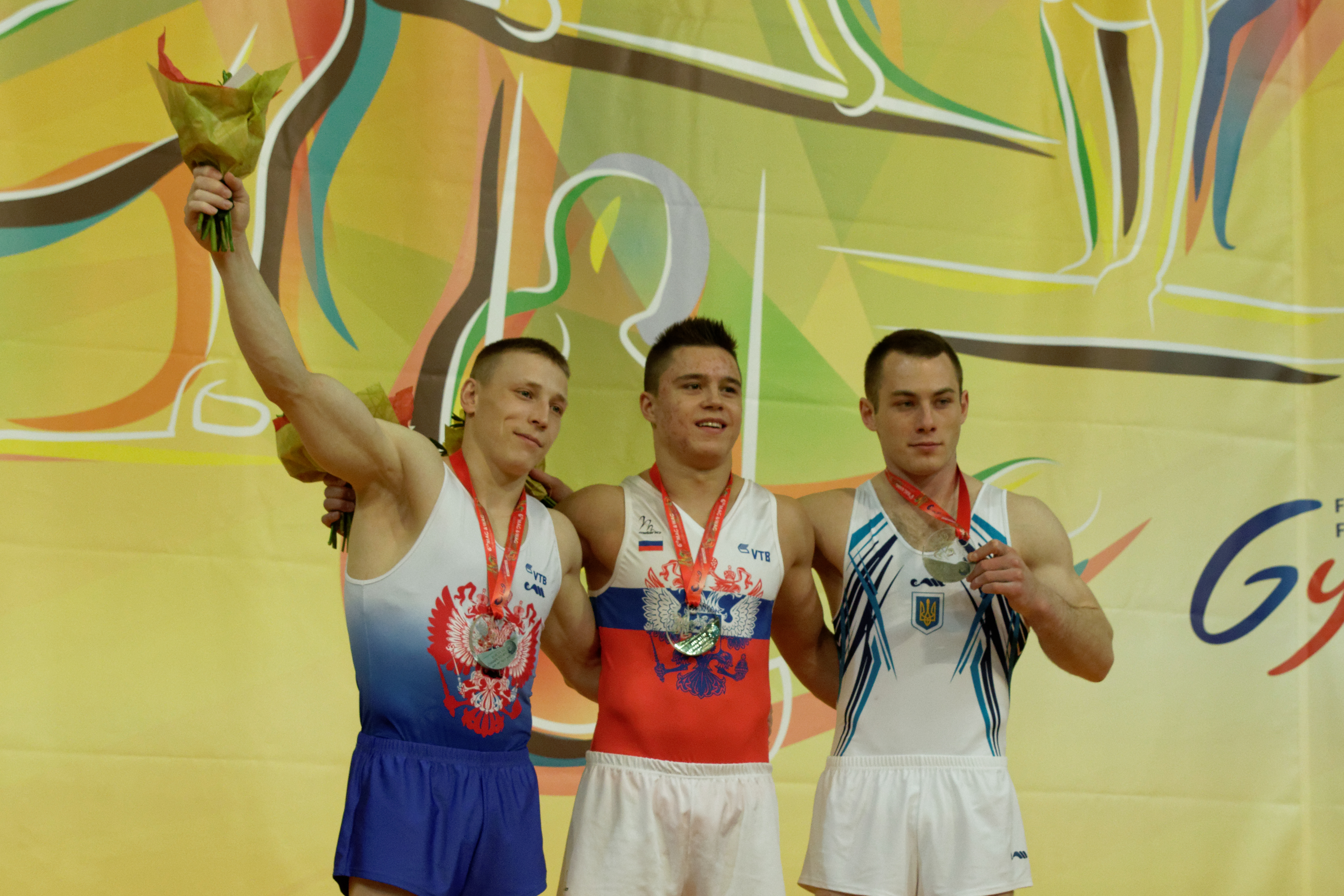
Medalists

Rank	Gymnast	D Score	E Score	Pen.	Score 1	D Score	E Score	Pen.	Score 2	Total
1st place, gold medalist(s)	Nikita Nagornyy (RUS)	6.0	9.266		15.266	5.6	9.333		14.933	15.099
2nd place, silver medalist(s)	Denis Ablyazin (RUS)	6.4	8.800	0.3	14.900	6.2	9.066		15.266	15.083
2nd place, silver medalist(s)	Igor Radivilov (UKR)	6.0	9.266		15.266	6.0	9.200	0.3	14.900	15.083
4	Artur Davtyan (ARM)	6.0	9.058	0.3	14.758	6.0	8.908	0.1	14.808	14.783
5	Kristian Thomas (GBR)	6.0	8.733	0.3	14.433	5.6	8.966		14.566	14.499
6	Benjamin Gischard (SUI)	5.6	8.000		13.600	5.6	9.166		14.766	14.183
7	Andrey Medvedev (ISR)	5.6	7.766		13.366	6.0	8.400	0.1	14.300	13.833
8	Matthias Fahrig (GER)	6.0	7.600	0.3	13.300	5.5	8.733	0.3	14.033	13.666
Rank	Gymnast	Vault 1				Vault 2				Total

=== Parallel bars ===
Oldest and youngest competitors

	Name	Country	Date of birth	Age
Youngest	Christian Baumann	Switzerland	25 February 1995	20 years, 1 month and 25 days
Oldest	Marius Berbecar	Romania	22 May 1985	29 years, 10 months and 28 days

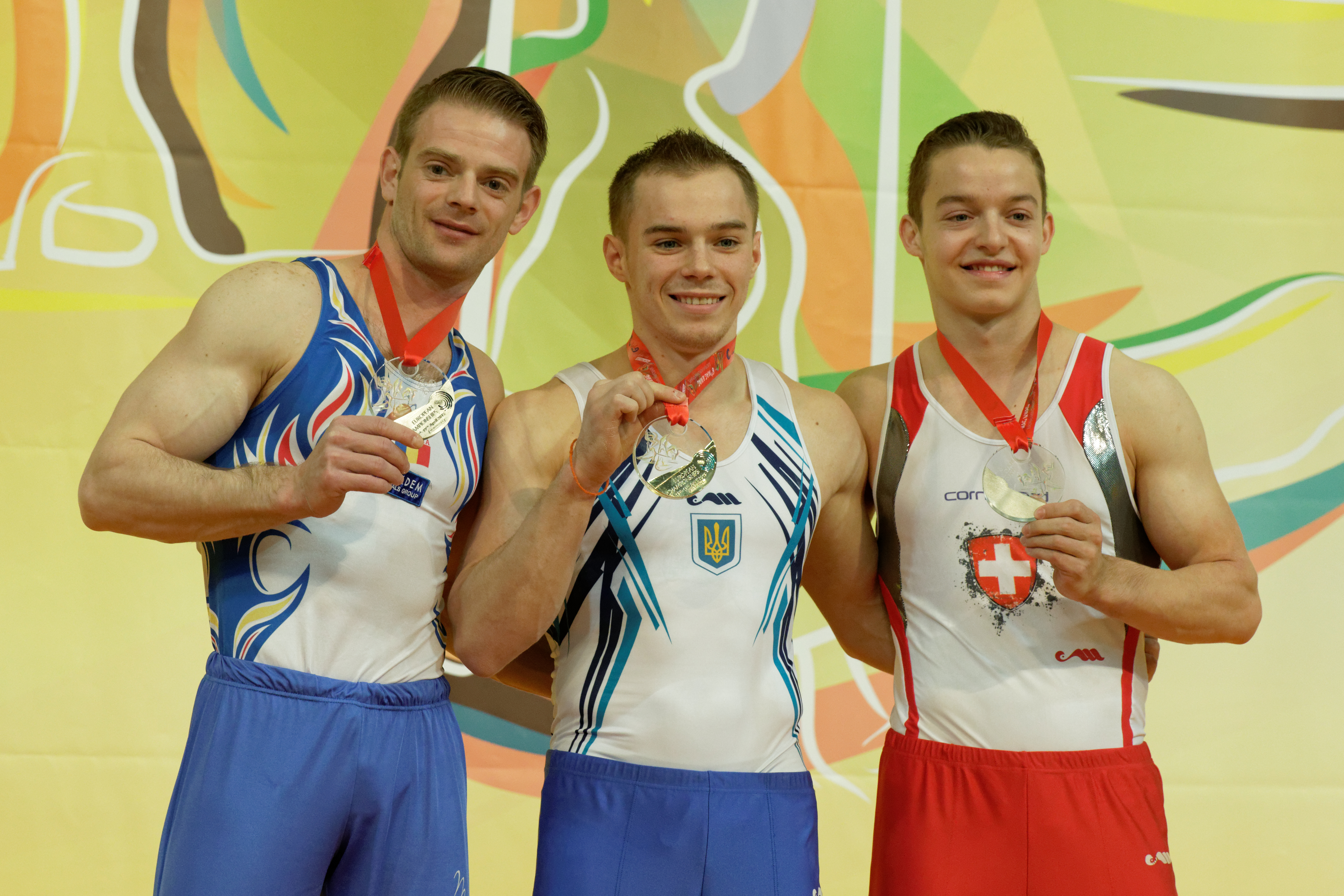
Medalists

Position	Gymnast	D Score	E Score	Penalty	Total
1st place, gold medalist(s)	Oleg Verniaiev (UKR)	6.900	8.966		15.866
2nd place, silver medalist(s)	Marius Berbecar (ROU)	6.700	8.600		15.300
2nd place, silver medalist(s)	Christian Baumann (SUI)	6.400	8.900		15.300
4	Oleg Stepko (AZE)	6.500	8.766		15.266
5	Andrei Muntean (ROU)	6.600	8.533		15.133
6	Petro Pakhnyuk (AZE)	6.500	8.466		14.966
7	Ferhat Arıcan (TUR)	6.200	7.633		13.833
8	Aliaksandr Tsarevich (BLR)	4.000	8.733		12.733

=== Horizontal bar ===
Oldest and youngest competitors

	Name	Country	Date of birth	Age
Youngest	Sam Oldham	Great Britain	17 February 1993	22 years, 2 months and 2 days
Oldest	Vlasios Maras	Greece	31 March 1983	32 years and 19 days

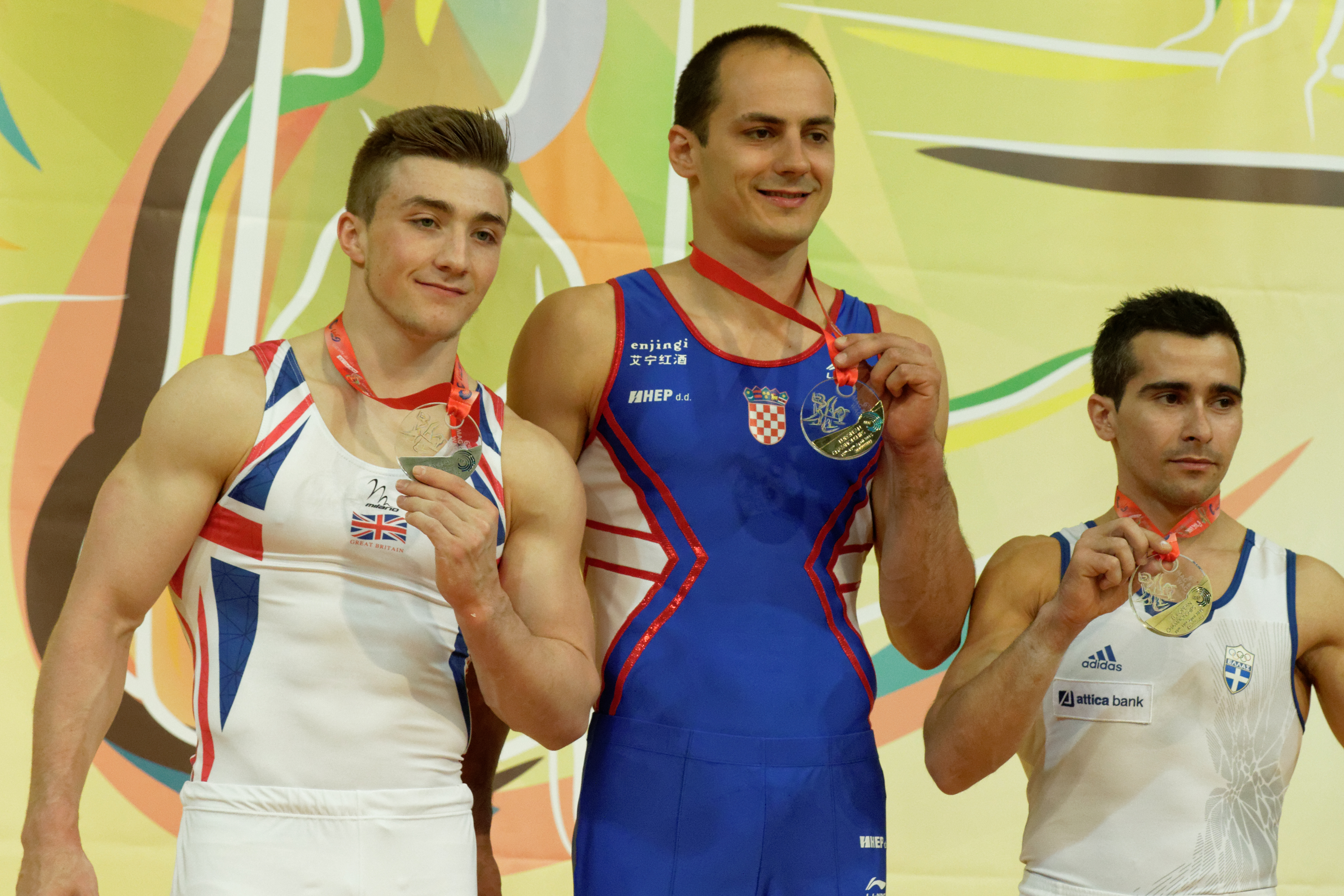
Medalists

Position	Gymnast	D Score	E Score	Penalty	Total
1st place, gold medalist(s)	Marijo Možnik (CRO)	6.700	8.133		14.833
2nd place, silver medalist(s)	Sam Oldham (GBR)	6.500	8.266		14.766
3rd place, bronze medalist(s)	Vlasios Maras (GRE)	6.600	8.066		14.666
4	Aliaksandr Tsarevich (BLR)	6.700	7.933		14.633
5	Alexander Shatilov (ISR)	6.500	8.066		14.566
6	Kristian Thomas (GBR)	6.500	7.533		14.033
7	Axel Augis (FRA)	6.300	7.466		13.766
8	Pablo Brägger (SUI)	6.000	6.433		12.433
9	Dzmitry Barkalau (BLR)	5.800	6.233		12.033

== Qualification results ==
=== Women's results ===
==== Individual All-around ====
Rank	Gymnast	Nation	Vault (gymnastics)	Uneven bars	Balance beam	Floor (gymnastics)	Total	Qual.
1	Maria Kharenkova	Russia	13.866	14.733	15.033	14.066	57.698	Q
2	Giulia Steingruber	Switzerland	15.366	13.966	13.300	14.333	56.965	Q
3	Ellie Downie	Great Britain	14.933	13.966	13.891	13.400	56.190	Q
4	Erika Fasana	Italy	14.433	13.766	13.841	14.000	56.040	Q
5	Claudia Fragapane	Great Britain	14.566	12.333	14.166	13.966	55.031	Q
6	Amy Tinkler	Great Britain	14.625	13.300	12.833	14.200	54.958	-
7	Ana Filipa Martins	Portugal	13.866	13.766	13.500	13.566	54.698	Q
8	Eythora Thorsdottir	Netherlands	13.783	13.600	13.500	13.800	54.683	Q
9	Daria Spiridonova	Russia	13.766	15.241	13.200	12.466	54.673	Q
10	Vanessa Ferrari	Italy	13.900	13.200	13.933	13.525	54.558	Q
11	Marta Pihan-Kulesza	Poland	13.800	13.666	12.933	14.133	54.532	Q
12	Martina Rizzelli	Italy	14.333	13.866	12.933	13.233	54.365	-
13	Carlotta Ferlito	Italy	13.866	13.000	14.058	13.400	54.324	-
14	Diana Bulimar	Romania	13.766	13.666	13.700	13.066	54.198	Q
15	Loan His	France	13.700	14.200	12.633	13.100	53.633	Q
16	Laura Jurca	Romania	14.400	12.800	12.466	13.666	53.332	Q
17	Jonna Adlerteg	Sweden	13.733	12.800	13.333	13.466	53.332	Q
18	Claire Martin	France	12.700	12.233	14.166	13.666	52.765	Q
19	Dyonnallys Supriana	Netherlands	13.666	13.033	12.966	13.100	52.765	Q
20	Jessica Diacci	Switzerland	13.700	12.900	13.233	12.866	52.699	Q
21	Noël van Klaveren	Netherlands	14.700	12.600	13.425	11.866	52.591	-
22	Pauline Tratz	Germany	13.933	12.433	12.600	13.433	52.339	Q
23	Ainhoa Carmona Urbano	Spain	13.866	12.466	13.100	12.666	52.098	Q
24	Caterina Barloggio	Switzerland	13.233	12.833	13.566	12.133	51.765	-
25	Louise Vanhille	France	13.933	13.333	12.400	12.033	51.699	-
26	Camille Bahl	France	14.866	11.066	12.300	13.383	51.615	-
27	Ana Pérez Campos	Spain	13.733	11.433	13.133	13.300	51.599	Q
28	Houry Gebeshian	Armenia	13.733	12.733	11.966	12.733	51.165	Q
29	Barbora Mokosova	Slovakia	13.866	12.966	11.866	12.333	51.031	Q
30	Krystyna Sankova	Ukraine	13.933	11.200	13.000	12.800	50.933	Q
31	Ilaria Käslin	Switzerland	13.666	13.100	12.466	11.633	50.865	-
32	Kitti Honti	Hungary	13.333	12.800	12.000	12.333	50.466	Q
33	Ellis O'Reilly	Ireland	13.333	11.966	12.166	12.733	50.198	R1
34	Katarzyna Jurkowska-Kowalska	Poland	13.683	10.800	12.566	12.833	49.882	R2
35	Rosanna Ojala	Finland	13.066	12.400	11.966	12.366	49.798	R3
36	Veronika Cenkova	Czech Republic	13.033	11.466	12.000	12.966	49.465	R4

- Vanessa Ferrari withdrew and was replaced by teammate Martina Rizzelli in the final.

==== Vault ====
Rank	Gymnast	Nation	D Score	E Score	Pen.	Score 1	D Score	E Score	Pen.	Score 2	Total	Qual.
Rank	Gymnast	Nation	Vault 1				Vault 2				Total	Qual.
1	Giulia Steingruber	Switzerland	6.200	9.166		15.366	5.800	9.100		14.900	15.133	Q
2	Ellie Downie	Great Britain	5.800	9.133		14.933	5.200	8.966		14.166	14.549	Q
3	Ksenia Afanasyeva	Russia	5.800	9.000		14.800	5.600	8.766	0.1	14.266	14.533	Q
4	Maria Paseka	Russia	5.600	8.666	0.1	14.166	5.800	8.866		14.666	14.416	Q
5	Claudia Fragapane	Great Britain	5.800	8.766		14.566	5.600	8.600		14.200	14.383	Q
6	Noël van Klaveren	Netherlands	5.800	8.900		14.700	5.600	8.508	0.1	14.008	14.354	Q
7	Teja Belak	Slovenia	5.300	8.866		14.166	5.300	8.900		14.200	14.183	Q
8	Camille Bahl	France	5.800	9.066		14.866	4.600	8.866		13.466	14.166	Q
9	Norma Robertsdottir	Iceland	5.300	8.666		13.966	4.800	8.600		13.400	13.683	R1
10	Pauline Tratz	Germany	5.000	8.933		13.933	4.400	8.966		13.366	13.649	R2
11	Marcela Torres	Sweden	5.200	9.033		14.233	4.800	8.233		13.033	13.633	R3

==== Uneven bars ====
Rank	Gymnast	Nation	D Score	E Score	Pen.	Total	Qual.
1	Daria Spiridonova	Russia	6.500	8.741		15.241	Q
2	Becky Downie	Great Britain	6.700	8.533		15.233	Q
3	Maria Kharenkova	Russia	6.200	8.533		14.733	Q
4	Sanne Wevers	Netherlands	5.600	8.633		14.233	Q
5	Maria Paseka	Russia	5.900	8.333		14.233	-
6	Loan His	France	5.900	8.300		14.200	Q
7	Ellie Downie	Great Britain	5.900	8.066		13.966	Q
8	Giulia Steingruber	Switzerland	6.000	7.966		13.966	Q
9	Martina Rizzelli	Italy	6.000	7.866		13.866	Q
10	Ana Filipa Martins	Portugal	5.400	8.366		13.766	R1
11	Erika Fasana	Italy	5.700	8.066		13.766	R2
12	Diana Bulimar	Romania	5.300	8.366		13.666	R3

==== Balance beam ====
Rank	Gymnast	Nation	D Score	E Score	Pen.	Total	Qual.
1	Maria Kharenkova	Russia	6.400	8.633		15.033	Q
2	Becky Downie	Great Britain	6.100	8.266		14.366	Q
3	Pauline Schäfer	Germany	5.800	8.533		14.333	Q
4	Andreea Munteanu	Romania	6.300	7.933		14.233	Q
5	Sanne Wevers	Netherlands	5.700	8.625	0.1	14.225	Q
6	Claire Martin	France	5.800	8.366		14.166	Q
6	Claudia Fragapane	Great Britain	5.800	8.366		14.166	Q
8	Vasiliki Millousi	Greece	6.100	8.166	0.1	14.166	Q
9	Andreea Iridon	Romania	5.700	8.400		14.100	R1
10	Carlotta Ferlito	Italy	5.700	8.358		14.058	R2
11	Vanessa Ferrari	Italy	5.800	8.133		13.933	R3

==== Floor ====
Rank	Gymnast	Nation	D Score	E Score	Pen.	Total	Qual.
1	Giulia Steingruber	Switzerland	6.000	8.333		14.333	Q
2	Ksenia Afanasyeva	Russia	6.100	8.166		14.266	Q
3	Amy Tinkler	Great Britain	5.900	8.300		14.200	Q
4	Marta Pihan-Kulesza	Poland	5.900	8.233		14.133	Q
5	Maria Kharenkova	Russia	5.900	8.166		14.066	Q
6	Erika Fasana	Italy	6.000	8.300	0.3	14.000	Q
7	Claudia Fragapane	Great Britain	6.100	8.166	0.3	13.966	Q
8	Andreea Munteanu	Romania	5.400	8.400		13.800	Q
9	Eythora Thorsdottir	Netherlands	5.600	8.300	0.1	13.800	R1
10	Claire Martin	France	5.200	8.466		13.666	R2
11	Laura Jurca	Romania	5.500	8.166		13.666	R3

=== Men's results ===
==== Individual All-around ====
Rank	Gymnast	Nation	Floor (gymnastics)	Pommel horse	Rings (gymnastics)	Vault (gymnastics)	Parallel bars	Horizontal bar	Total	Qual.
1	Oleg Verniaiev	Ukraine	14.533	14.766	15.200	15.433	16.000	13.900	89.832	Q
2	Oleg Stepko	Azerbaijan	14.466	14.966	14.658	13.766	15.300	13.700	86.856	Q
3	Daniel Purvis	Great Britain	14.866	14.600	14.333	13.566	15.200	14.166	86.731	Q
4	Arthur Davtyan	Armenia	13.800	14.500	14.800	15.366	14.466	13.566	86.498	Q
5	Dzmitry Barkalau	Belarus	14.500	13.966	14.200	14.300	14.466	14.733	86.165	Q
6	David Belyavskiy	Russia	15.066	13.066	14.600	14.666	14.200	14.266	85.864	Q
7	Nikolai Kuksenkov	Russia	14.433	13.633	14.641	14.933	14.066	13.733	85.439	Q
8	Sam Oldham	Great Britain	13.700	12.933	14.333	14.533	14.833	14.766	85.098	Q
9	Christian Baumann	Switzerland	14.300	12.766	14.016	14.266	15.366	13.933	84.647	Q
10	Claudo Capelli	Switzerland	14.466	13.633	13.500	14.133	14.733	13.266	83.731	Q
11	Ferhat Arıcan	Turkey	12.833	14.433	13.500	14.600	15.300	12.633	83.299	Q
12	Rokas Guščinas	Lithuania	13.033	14.666	13.891	13.333	14.233	14.066	83.222	Q
13	Maxime Gentges	Belgium	14.366	12.900	13.866	14.333	13.933	13.700	83.098	Q
14	Axel Augis	France	12.933	11.866	14.366	14.600	14.900	14.400	83.065	Q
15	Marios Georgiou	Cyprus	13.800	13.500	13.033	14.500	14.300	13.766	82.899	Q
16	Alberto Tallón	Spain	14.666	13.066	14.400	13.733	14.200	12.566	82.631	Q
17	Karl Oskar Kirmes	Finland	14.933	12.066	13.900	14.400	13.433	13.808	82.540	Q
18	Mykyta Yermak	Ukraine	13.600	13.766	13.666	14.233	14.233	12.733	82.231	Q
19	Nikolaos Iliopoulos	Greece	12.166	13.700	13.866	14.116	14.866	13.400	82.114	Q
20	Tomas Kuzmickas	Lithuania	13.900	12.833	13.233	14.200	14.266	13.666	82.098	Q
21	Petro Pakhnyuk	Azerbaijan	14.633	14.000	13.066	13.333	15.366	11.500	81.898	Q
22	Artem Dolgopyat	Israel	13.533	13.833	12.266	14.333	13.766	13.166	81.897	Q
23	Ludovico Edalli	Italy	13.500	13.808	13.200	14.016	13.400	13.800	81.724	Q
24	Stian Skjerahaug	Norway	14.500	12.566	13.300	14.366	13.366	13.233	81.331	Q
25	Florian Landuyf	Belgium	13.800	13.200	13.166	14.616	14.066	12.433	81.281	R1
26	Sebastian Krimmer	Germany	12.700	14.000	13.000	14.433	14.100	13.033	81.266	R2
27	Jim Zona	France	14.075	12.466	13.866	14.466	14.333	11.900	81.106	R3
28	Rubén López	Spain	13.166	12.500	14.533	14.350	12.966	13.533	81.048	R4

== Medal count ==
=== Total ===
Rank	Nation	Gold	Silver	Bronze	Total
1	Russia	4	5	1	10
2	Great Britain	2	4	2	8
3	Ukraine	2	1	0	3
4	Switzerland	1	2	2	5
5	Romania	1	1	0	2
6	Greece	1	0	1	2
7	Croatia	1	0	0	1
8	France	0	1	1	2
9	Armenia	0	1	0	1
10	Italy	0	0	1	1
10	Netherlands	0	0	1	1
Totals (11 entries)		12	15	9	36

=== Women ===
Rank	Nation	Gold	Silver	Bronze	Total
1	Russia	3	1	1	5
2	Switzerland	1	1	1	3
3	Romania	1	0	0	1
4	Great Britain	0	3	1	4
5	France	0	0	1	1
5	Netherlands	0	0	1	1
Totals (6 entries)		5	5	5	15

=== Men ===
Rank	Nation	Gold	Silver	Bronze	Total
1	Great Britain	2	1	1	4
2	Ukraine	2	1	0	3
3	Russia	1	4	0	5
4	Greece	1	0	1	2
5	Croatia	1	0	0	1
6	Switzerland	0	1	1	2
7	Armenia	0	1	0	1
7	France	0	1	0	1
7	Romania	0	1	0	1
10	Italy	0	0	1	1
Totals (10 entries)		7	10	4	21
