= Marius Berbecar =

Romanian artistic gymnast

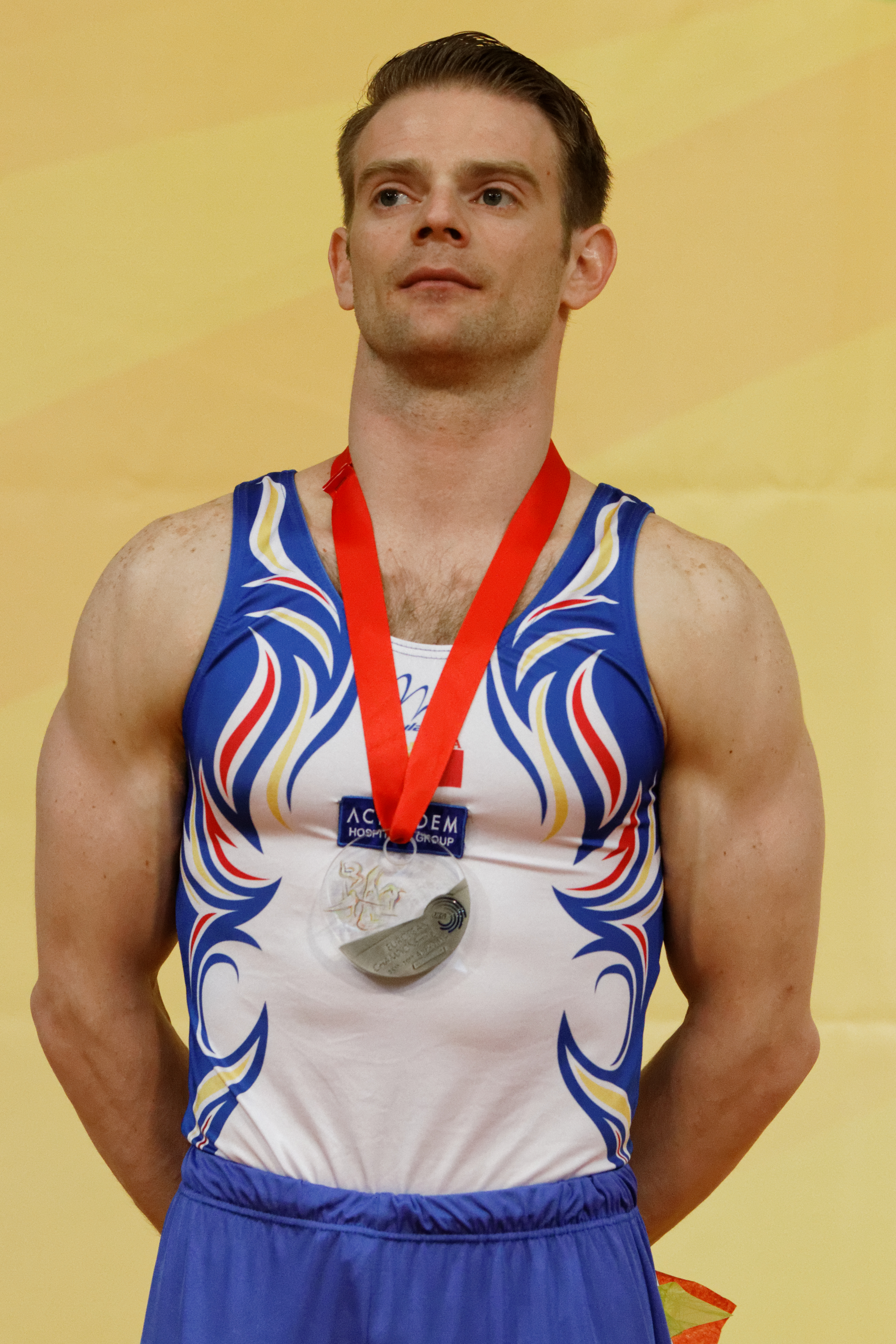

Personal information
- Full name: Marius Daniel Berbecar
- Born: 22 May 1985 (age 41) Bistrița, Romania

Gymnastics career
- Discipline: Men's artistic gymnastics
- Country represented: Romania
- Club: CSM Bistrița
Medal record
Representing Romania
European Games
Bronze medal – third place	2015 Baku	Parallel Bars
European Championships
Silver medal – second place	2015 Montpellier	Parallel Bars
Bronze medal – third place	2012 Montpellier	Team
Universiade
Silver medal – second place	2011 Shenzhen	Parallel Bars
Bronze medal – third place	2011 Shenzhen	Team

Marius Daniel Berbecar (born 22 May 1985 in Bistrița) is a Romanian senior artistic gymnast, representing his nation at international competitions. He competed at world championships, including the 2009 World Artistic Gymnastics Championships in London, United Kingdom.
