= Gymnastics at the 2012 Summer Olympics – Men's horizontal bar =

Men's horizontal bar at the Games of the XXX Olympiad
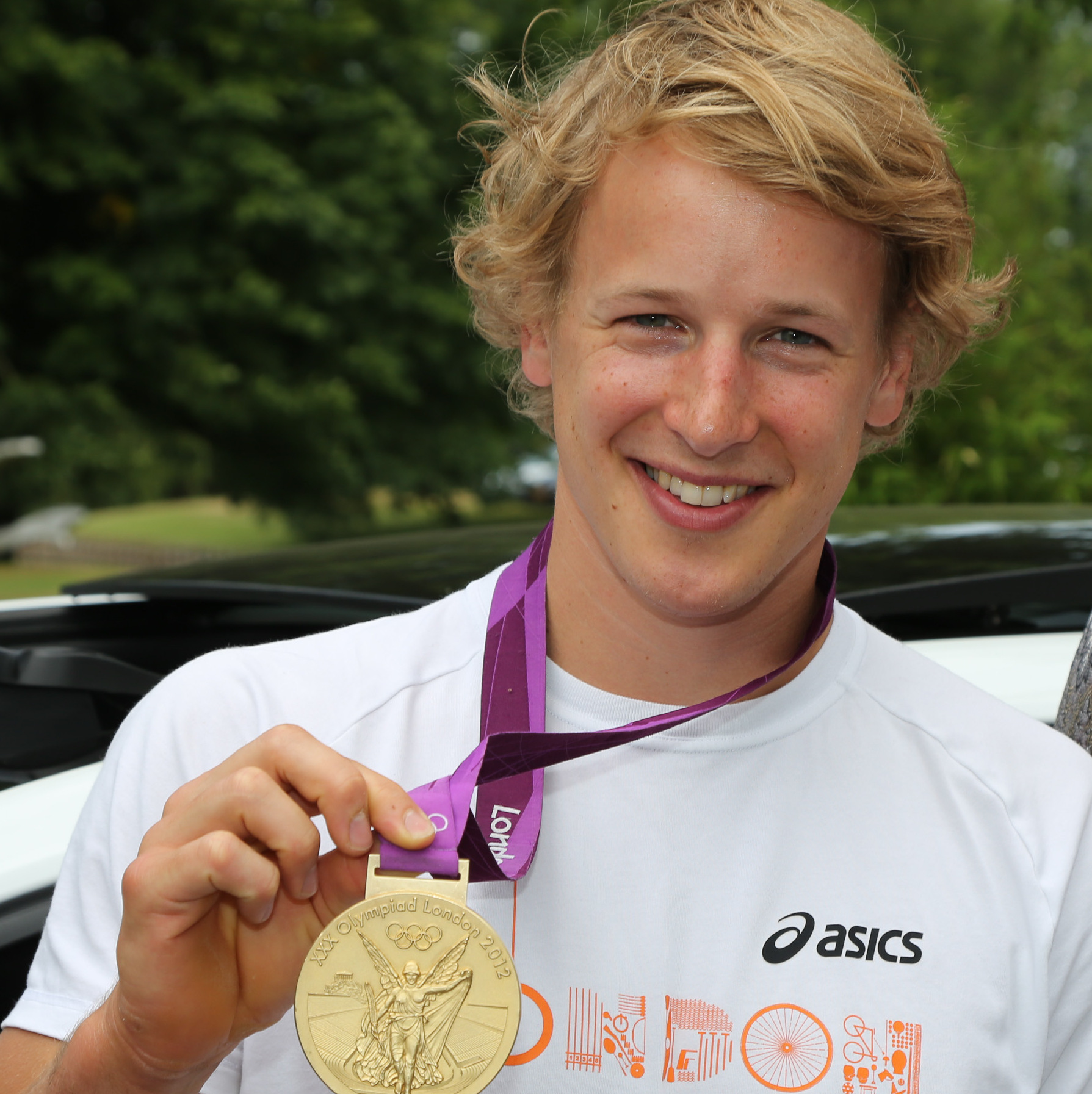
- Epke Zonderland
- Venue: North Greenwich Arena 1
- Dates: 28 July (qualifying); 7 August (final)
- Competitors: 70 from 33 nations
- Winning score: 16.533

Medalists
1st place, gold medalist(s)		Epke Zonderland; Netherlands
2nd place, silver medalist(s)		Fabian Hambüchen; Germany
3rd place, bronze medalist(s)		Zou Kai; China

The men's horizontal bar competition at the 2012 Summer Olympics was held at the North Greenwich Arena on 28 July and 7 August. It featured 70 competitors from 33 nations.

Epke Zonderland of the Netherlands won the event, his nation's first victory in the horizontal bar and first medal in any Olympic gymnastics event since 1928. Fabian Hambüchen of Germany took silver, while Zou Kai of China earned bronze. Hambüchen and Zou—the bronze and gold medalists, respectively, in 2008—were the 11th and 12th men to win multiple medals in the event.

== Background ==
This was the 23rd appearance of the men's horizontal bar event in the Olympics. Azerbaijan, Bangladesh, Hong Kong, and Slovakia each made their debut in the event. The United States made its 21st appearance, the most of any nation, having missed only the inaugural 1896 competition and the boycotted 1980 Games.

Five of the eight finalists from 2008 returned: gold medalist Zou Kai of China, silver medalist Jonathan Horton of the United States, bronze medalist (and 2004 finalist) Fabian Hambüchen of Germany, seventh-place finisher Epke Zonderland of the Netherlands, and eighth-place finisher Yann Cucherat of France.

== Competition format ==
The top eight competitors in the qualification phase (with a limit of two per country) advanced to the apparatus final. Qualification scores were then erased, with only final-round scores counting.

== Final results ==
Rank	Gymnast	Nation	D Score	E Score	Pen.	Total
1st place, gold medalist(s)	Epke Zonderland	Netherlands	7.900	8.633		16.533
2nd place, silver medalist(s)	Fabian Hambüchen	Germany	7.500	8.900		16.400
3rd place, bronze medalist(s)	Zou Kai	China	7.900	8.466		16.366
4	Zhang Chenglong	China	7.700	8.566		16.266
5	Danell Leyva	United States	7.200	8.633		15.833
6	Jonathan Horton	United States	6.800	8.666		15.466
7	Emin Garibov	Russia	7.100	8.233		15.333
8	Kim Ji-hoon	South Korea	7.100	8.033		15.133
