= German Artistic Gymnastics Championships =

The German Artistic Gymnastics Championships is an artistic gymnastics competition, hosted by the German Gymnastics Federation (German: Deutscher Turner-Bund).

== Winners ==
=== All-around ===
Year	Location	Men	Women
1991	Bonn	Andreas Wecker	Anke Schönfelder
1992	Duisburg	Andreas Wecker	Diana Schröder
1993	Bremen	Oliver Walther	Sandra Tomaschko
1994	Hamburg	Marius Toba	Gabi Weller
1995	Nellingen	Waleri Belenki	Yvonne Pioch
1996	Hanover	Peter Nikiferow	Kathleen Stark
1997	Heilbronn	Sergej Scharkow	Gritt Hofmann
1998	Munich	Sven Kwiatkowski	Yvonne Pioch
1999	Chemnitz	Andreas Wecker	Katrin Kewitz
2000	Albstadt	Sergej Pfeifer	Birgit Schweigert
2001	Dessau	Thomas Andergassen	Birgit Schweigert
2002	Leipzig	Sven Kwiatkowski	Conny Schütz
2003	Heilbronn	Ronny Ziesmer	Katja Abel
2004	Chemnitz	Thomas Andergassen	Lisa Brüggemann
2005	Berlin	Fabian Hambüchen	Daria Bijak
2006	Stuttgart	Fabian Hambüchen	Daria Bijak
2007	Gießen	Fabian Hambüchen	Oksana Chusovitina
2008	Chemnitz	Fabian Hambüchen	Oksana Chusovitina
2009	Frankfurt	Fabian Hambüchen	Kim Bui
2010	Berlin	Marcel Nguyen	Elisabeth Seitz
2011	Göppingen	Philipp Boy	Elisabeth Seitz
2012	Düsseldorf	Fabian Hambüchen	Elisabeth Seitz
2013	Rhine-Neckar	Fabian Hambüchen	Elisabeth Seitz
2014	Stuttgart	Fabian Hambüchen	Kim Bui
2015	Gießen	Fabian Hambüchen	Elisabeth Seitz
2016	Hamburg	Andreas Toba	Sophie Scheder
2017	Berlin	Lukas Dauser	Elisabeth Seitz
2018	Leipzig	Marcel Nguyen	Elisabeth Seitz
2019	Berlin	Andreas Toba	Sarah Voss
2021	Dortmund	Lukas Dauser	Elisabeth Seitz
2022	Berlin	Lukas Dauser	Sarah Voss
2023	Düsseldorf	Pascal Brendel	Elisabeth Seitz
2024	Frankfurt	Lukas Dauser	Helen Kevric
2025	Dresden	Timo Eder	Karina Schönmaier
2026	Hanover	Radomyr Stelmakh	Silja Stöhr

== See also ==
- Men's National Team
- Women's National Team
