= Gymnastics at the 2012 Summer Olympics – Men's parallel bars =

Olympic gymnastics event

Men's parallel bars at the Games of the XXX Olympiad
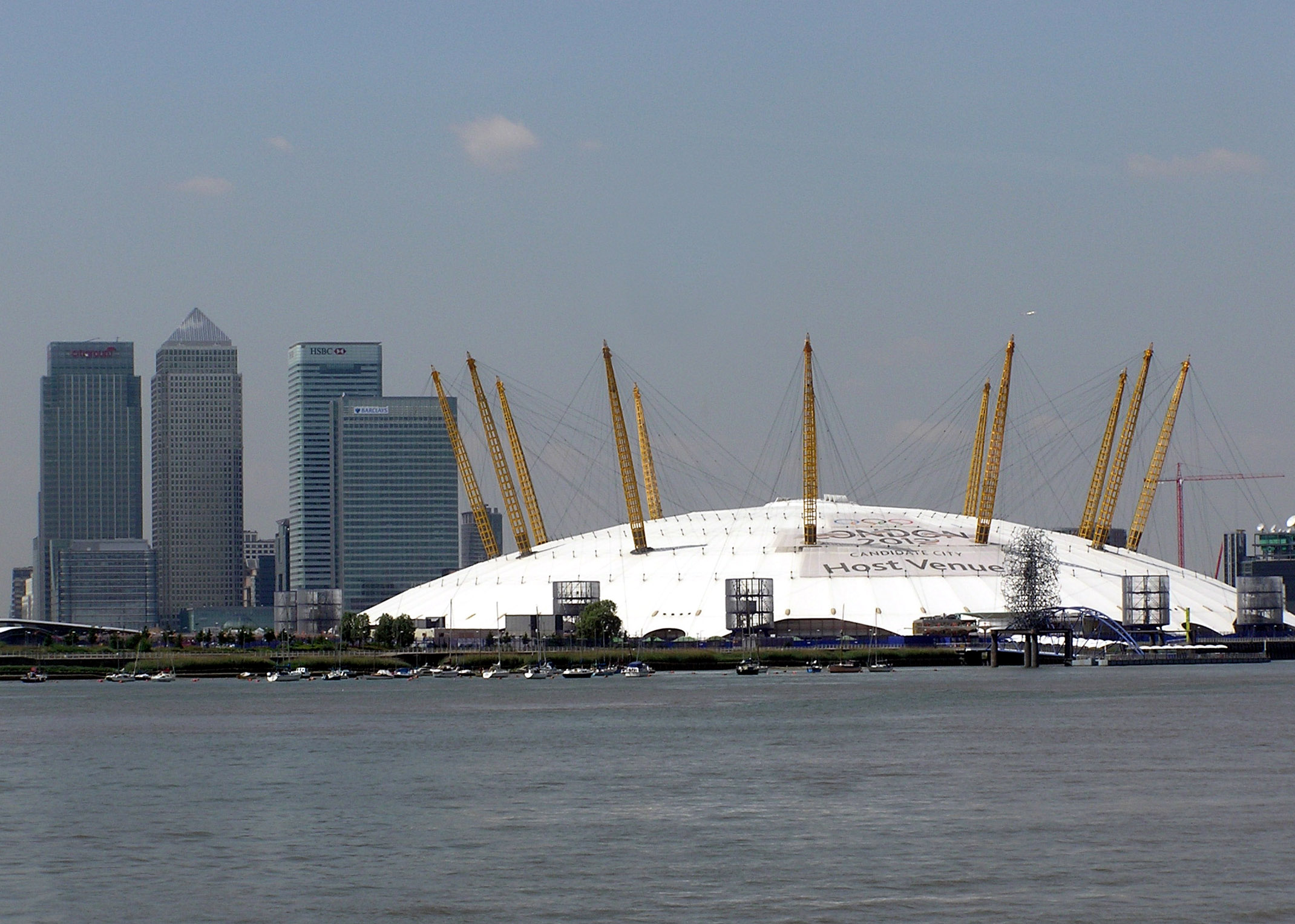
- Canary wharf and dome London
- Venue: North Greenwich Arena 1
- Dates: 28 July (qualifying); 7 August (final)
- Competitors: 71 from 33 nations
- Winning score: 15.966

Medalists
1st place, gold medalist(s)		Feng Zhe	China
2nd place, silver medalist(s)		Marcel Nguyen	Germany
3rd place, bronze medalist(s)		Hamilton Sabot	France

The men's parallel bars competition at the 2012 Summer Olympics was held at the North Greenwich Arena on 28 July and 7 August. It included 71 competitors from 33 nations.

Feng Zhe of China won the gold medal, his nation's second consecutive victory in the parallel bars competition and third overall. Marcel Nguyen's silver was the first medal for a German gymnast in the event since 1988. Hamilton Sabot won the bronze, France's first parallel bars medal.

The final included nine gymnasts instead of the standard eight after a tie for the last spot could not be resolved.

== Background ==
This was the 23rd appearance of the parallel bars event at the Olympics. Only one of the eight finalists from 2008 returned: fourth-place finisher Fabian Hambüchen of Germany. Danell Leyva of the United States was the reigning world champion; Feng Zhe of China had won the world championship in 2010 and finished second in 2011. Marcel Nguyen of Germany was a two-time European champion.

Azerbaijan, Bangladesh, Slovakia, and Vietnam each made their debut in the men's parallel bars. The United States made its 21st appearance, the most of any nation.

== Competition format ==
The top eight competitors in the qualification phase (with a limit of two per country) advanced to the apparatus final. Qualification scores were then erased, with only final-round scores counting.

Kōhei Uchimura finished fifth in the qualifying round but did not advance because two other Japanese competitors, Kazuhito and Yusuke Tanaka, placed first and second. With Uchimura ineligible, the ninth-place gymnast would advance, but there was a tie. The normal tie-breakers were unable to separate Zhang Chenglong and Hamilton Sabot, so both advanced.

== Final results ==
Rank	Gymnast	Nation	D Score	E Score	Pen.	Total
1st place, gold medalist(s)	Feng Zhe	China	7.000	8.966		15.966
2nd place, silver medalist(s)	Marcel Nguyen	Germany	6.800	9.000		15.800
3rd place, bronze medalist(s)	Hamilton Sabot	France	6.700	8.866		15.566
4	Kazuhito Tanaka	Japan	6.700	8.800		15.500
5	Daniel Corral	Mexico	6.600	8.733		15.333
6	Emin Garibov	Russia	6.500	8.800		15.300
6	Vasileios Tsolakidis	Greece	6.500	8.800		15.300
8	Yusuke Tanaka	Japan	6.400	8.700		15.100
9	Zhang Chenglong	China	6.300	7.508		13.808
