= Lukas Dauser =

German artistic gymnast

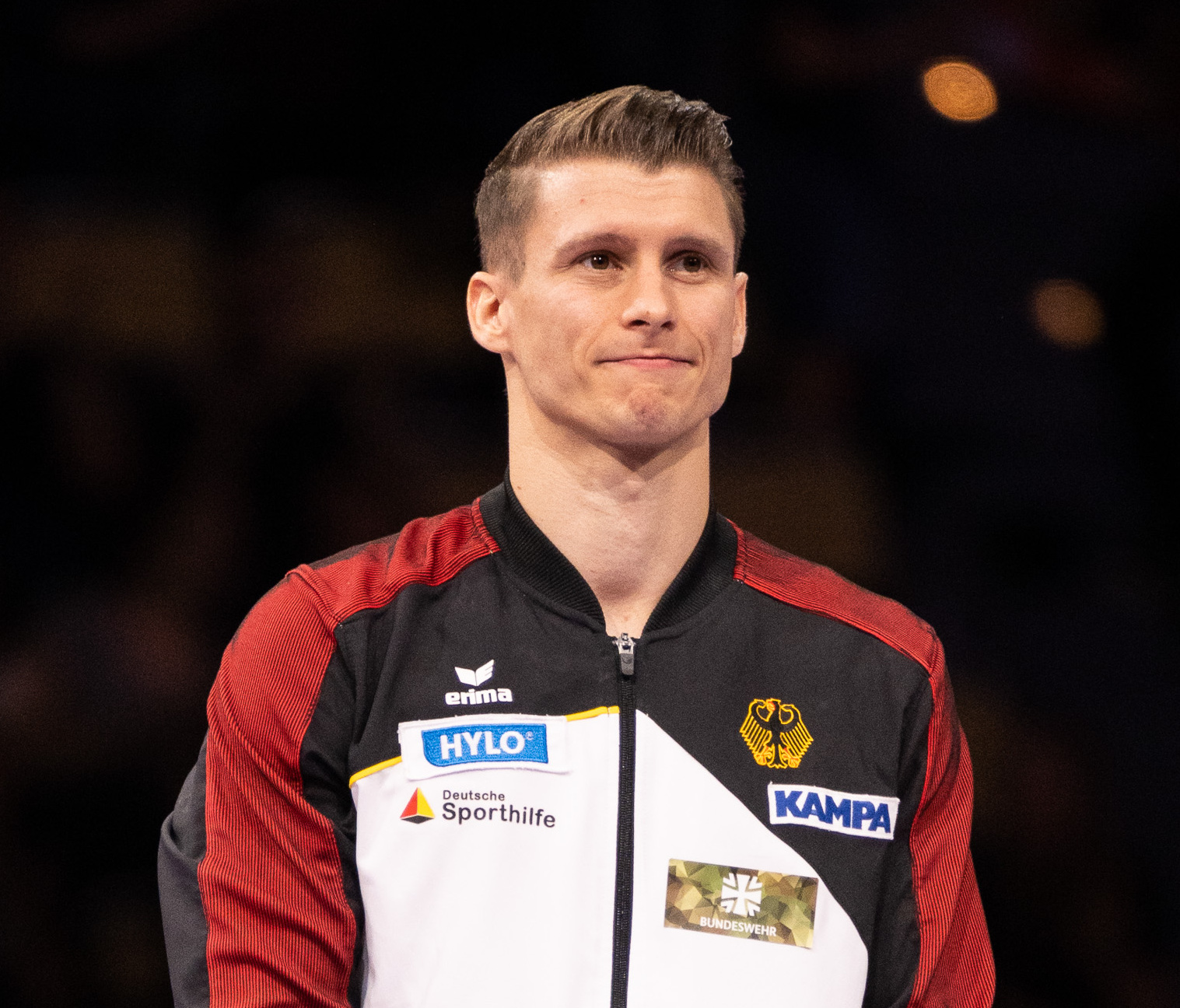
- Dauser at the 2022 European Championships

Personal information
- Full name: Lukas Dauser
- Born: 15 June 1993 (age 33) Ebersberg, Bavaria, Germany
- Height: 1.72 m (5 ft 8 in)

Gymnastics career
- Discipline: Men's artistic gymnastics
- Country represented: Germany; (2014–2024)
- Club: TSV Unterhaching
- Head coach: Sebastian Faust
- Retired: November 9, 2024
Medal record
Men's artistic gymnastics
Representing Germany
Olympic Games
Silver medal – second place	2020 Tokyo	Parallel Bars
World Championships
Gold medal – first place	2023 Antwerp	Parallel Bars
Silver medal – second place	2022 Liverpool	Parallel Bars
European Championships
Silver medal – second place	2017 Cluj-Napoca	Parallel Bars
Bronze medal – third place	2021 Basel	Parallel Bars

Lukas Dauser (born 15 June 1993) is a German male artistic gymnast and a three-time Olympian, having competed at the 2016, 2020, and 2024 Olympic Games. He is the 2023 World Champion and the 2020 Olympic and 2022 World silver medalist on the parallel bars.

== Gymnastics career ==
Dauser became a member of the first German gymnastics league at the age of 19. He formerly trained in Berlin, although he represented two gymnastics clubs – TSV Unterhaching and KTV Straubenhardt from Bavaria and Baden-Württemberg.

=== 2014–2016 ===
Dauser's major international debut came at the 2014 World Championships in Nanjing, PRC. There, he placed eighth as a member of the German squad in the team all-around tournament. In the same year, Dauser performed a new element on the parallel bars during the Challenge Cup in Anadia, Portugal. Due to its complexity, the International Gymnastics Federation officially named an element on the parallel bars after him, involving a giant swing backward with Makuts to an upper-arm hang.

In 2016, Dauser became the national champion on parallel bars, scoring even more points than Marcel Nguyen, the country's previous leader on parallel bars. At the pre-Olympic qualification, the German team ranked first, with Dauser capping off the meet in fourth position on the parallel bars. On 10 July, Andreas Hirsch, head coach of the German national team, proposed that Dauser would be included in the national team to the 2016 Summer Olympics in Rio de Janeiro. There, Dauser, along with the German quintet of Andreas Bretschneider, Fabian Hambüchen, Marcel Nguyen, and Andreas Toba, scored a total of 261.275 points to take the seventh position in the team all-around final.

=== 2017–2019 ===
Dauser competed at various All-Around World Cups in 2017, eventually winning bronze in London behind Oleg Verniaiev and Donnell Whittenburg. At the 2017 European Championships, Dauser won silver on parallel bars behind Verniaiev. During the German national championships in June, Dauser tore his ACL and was unable to compete for the remainder of the year.

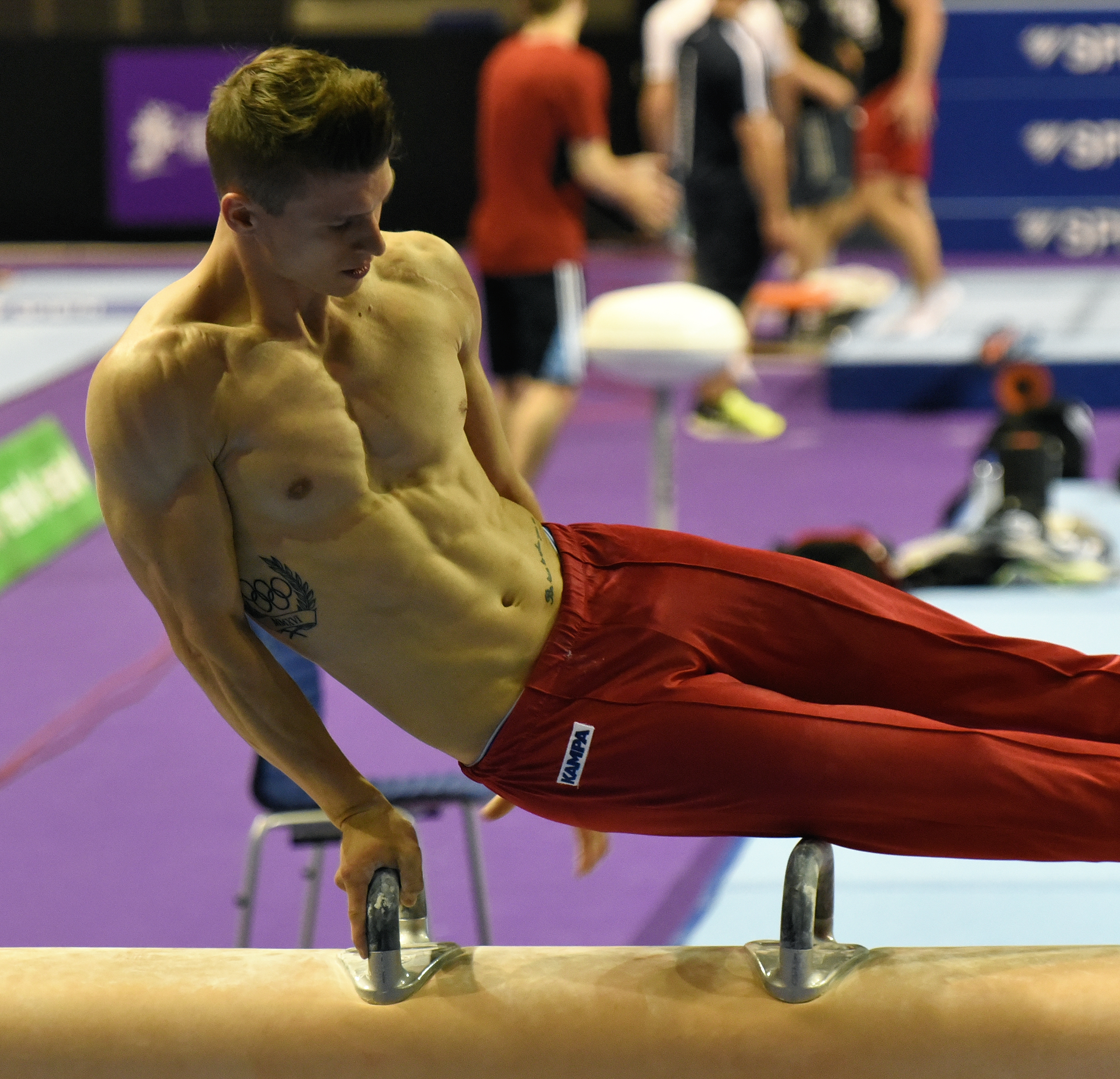
Pommel horse

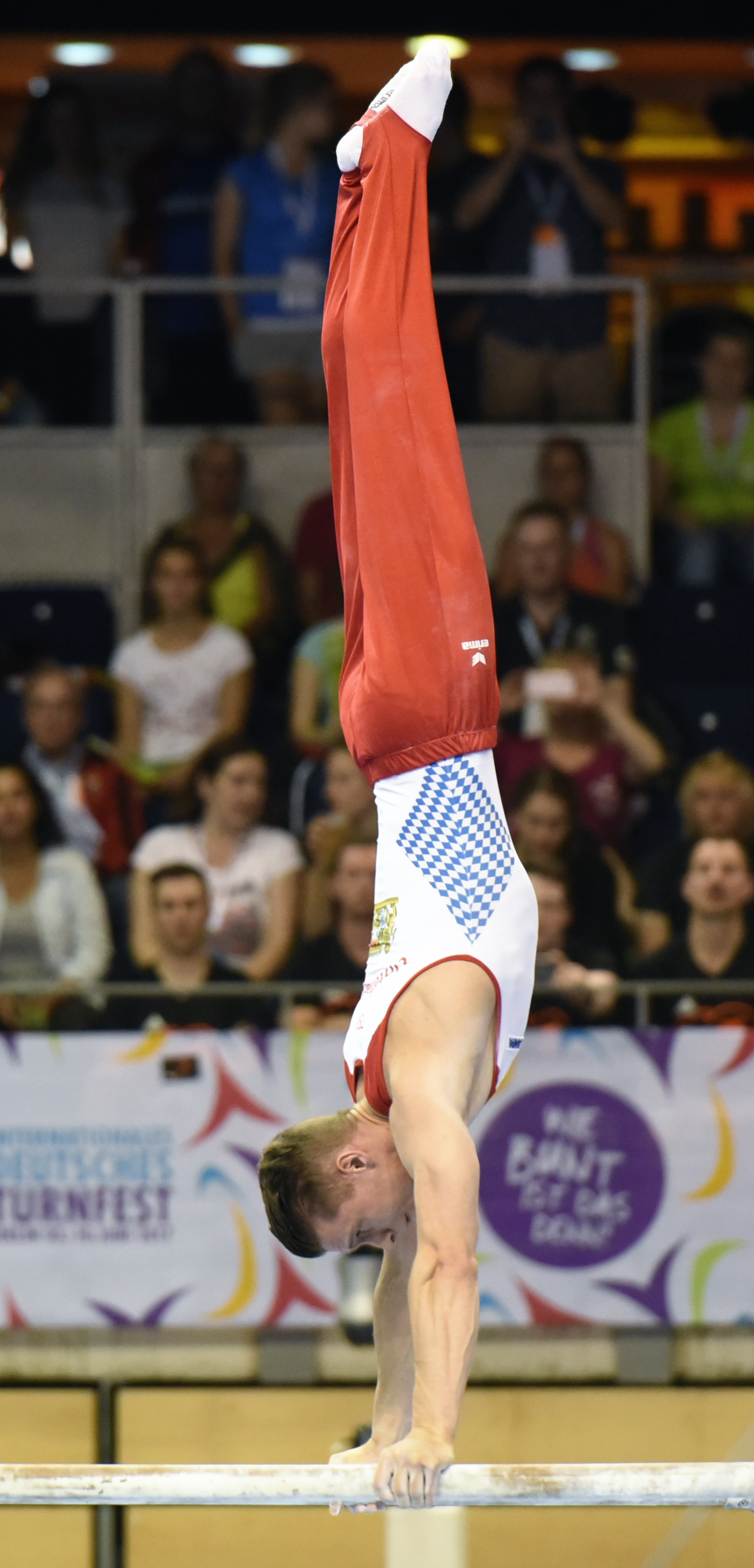
Parallel bars

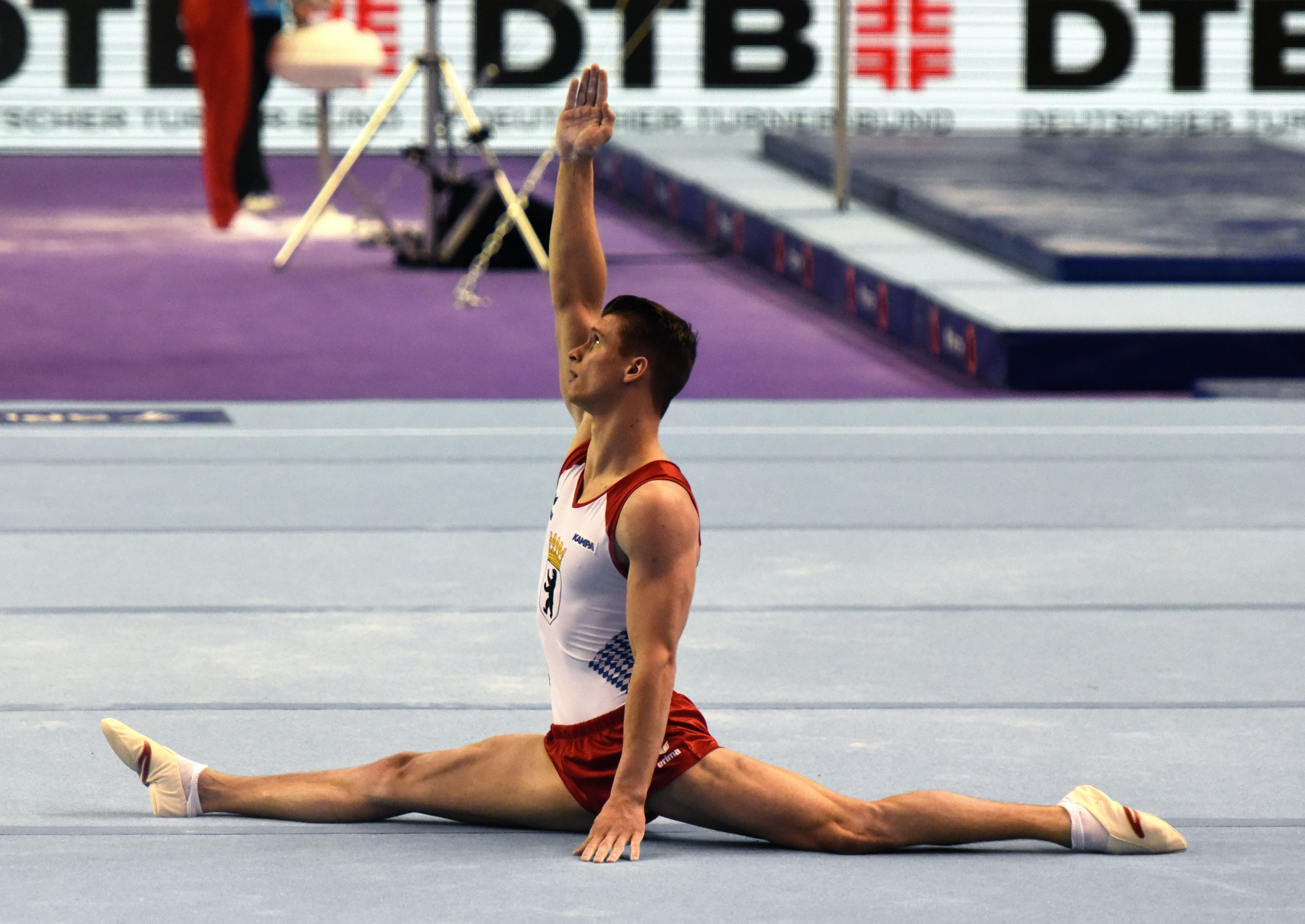
Floor exercise

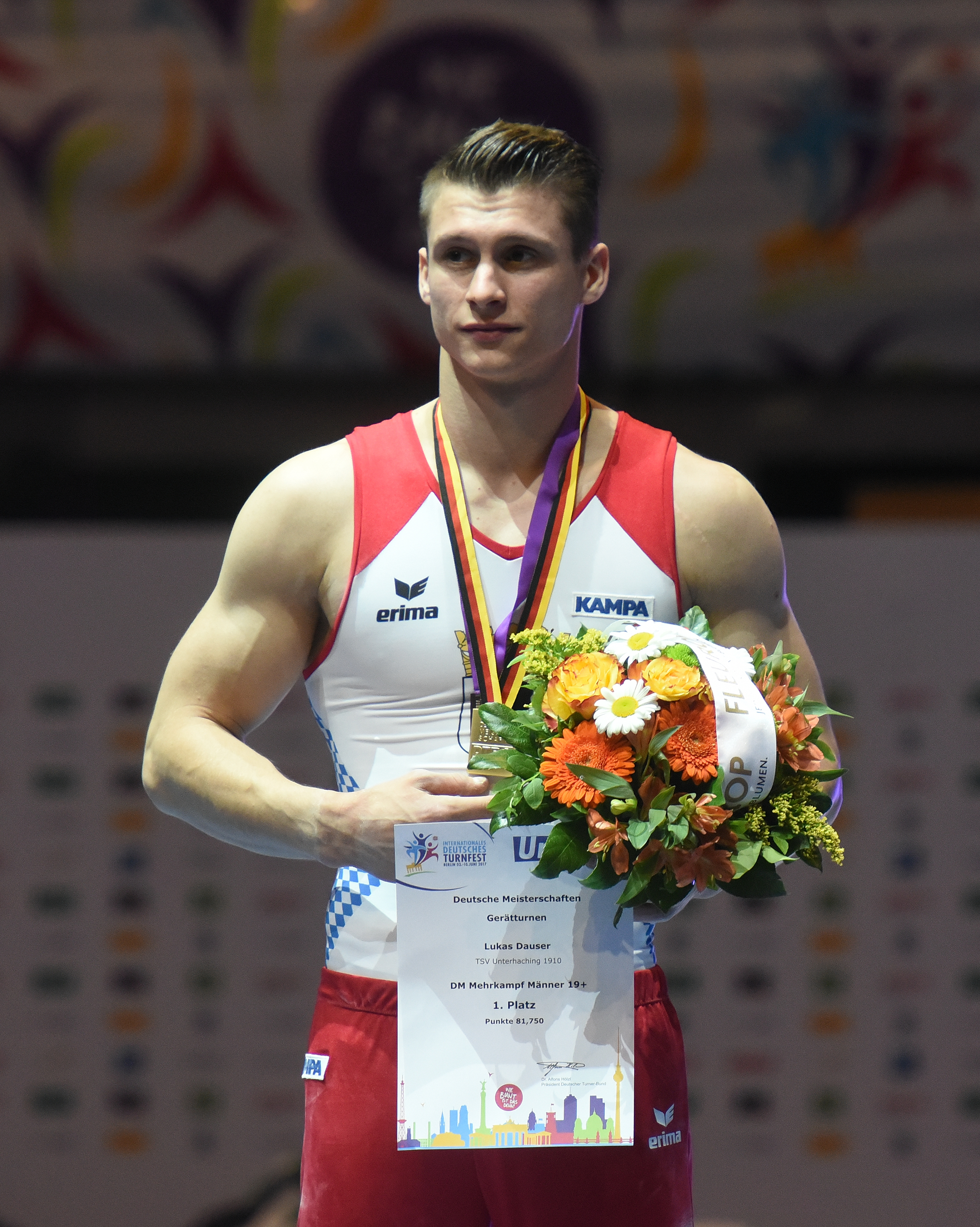
Podium

Dauser at the 2017 International German Gymnastics Festival

Dauser returned to competition at the 2018 World Championships where he finished 24th in the all-around and eighth on parallel bars. He next competed at the Cottbus World Cup where he finished eighth on parallel bars.

In April 2019, Dauser competed at the European Championships; he was the second reserve for the parallel bars final. At the 2019 World Championships, Dauser once again finished eighth on parallel bars.

=== 2020–2021 ===
Most competitions in 2020 were either canceled or postponed, including the 2020 Summer Olympics, due to the COVID-19 pandemic. At the 2021 European Championships Dauser won bronze on the parallel bars behind Ferhat Arıcan and David Belyavskiy.

Dauser was selected to compete at the 2020 Olympic Games alongside Nils Dunkel, Philipp Herder, and Andreas Toba. Together they finished eighth as a team. Individually, Dauser qualified for the all-around and parallel bars finals. During the all-around final, he finished eighth. Dauser won a silver medal on parallel bars behind Zou Jingyuan of China. For this, he was awarded the Silbernes Lorbeerblatt, the highest sports award in Germany, by the German President Frank-Walter Steinmeier.

=== 2022 ===
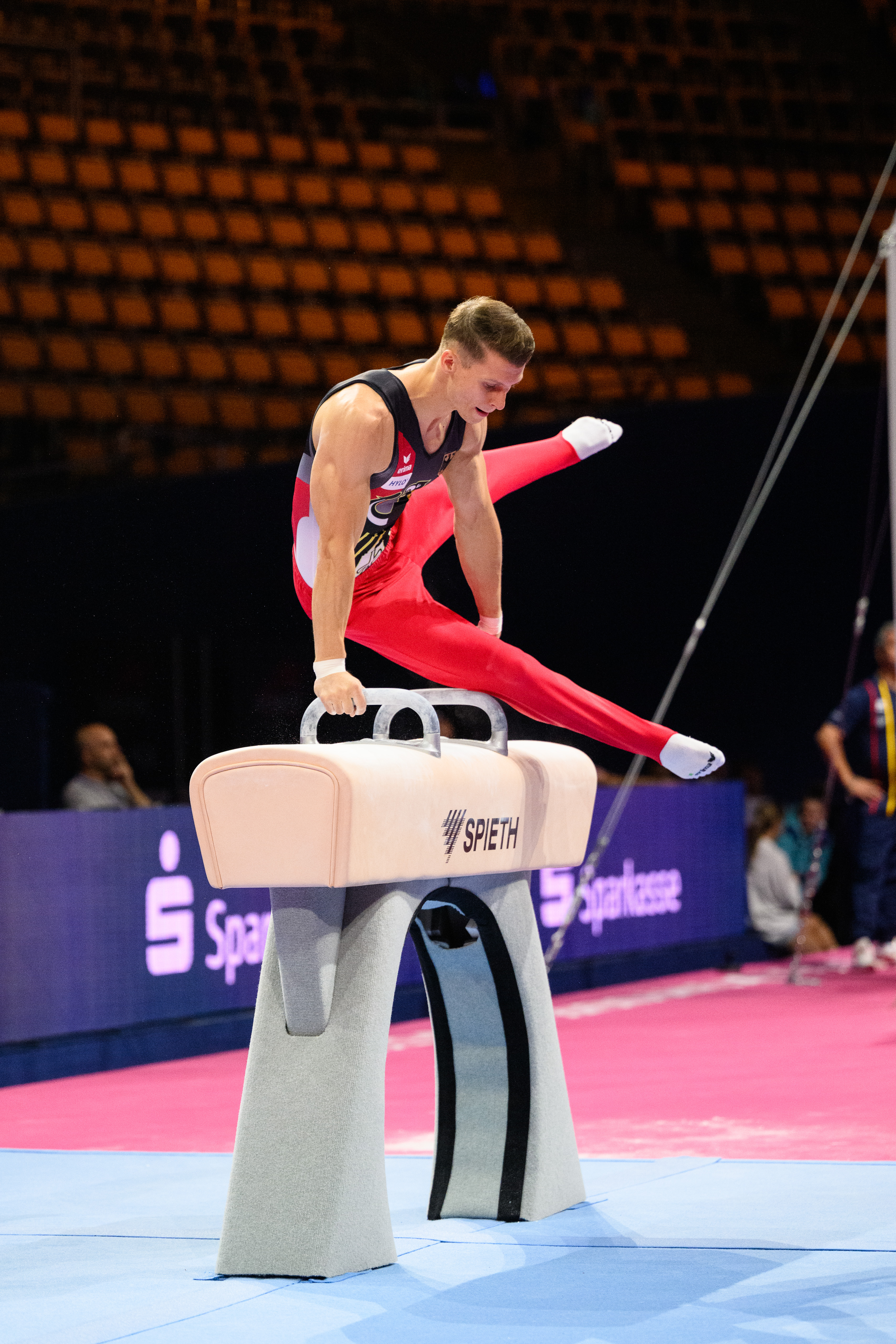
Dauser at the 2022 European Championships

Dauser competed at the 2022 European Championships in Munich, where he finished ninth in the all-around. Additionally, he qualified for the parallel bars final and helped Germany qualify for the team final. During the team final, Germany finished seventh. Dauser finished eighth on the parallel bars after falling off the apparatus during event finals.

At the 2022 World Championships, Dauser finished eleventh in the all-around. During the parallel bars final he won silver behind Zou Jingyuan.

=== 2023 ===
In September, Dauser competed at the Paris World Challenge Cup; he won gold on parallel bars and placed fourth on horizontal bar and seventh on pommel horse.

The following month, Dauser competed at the 2023 World Championships alongside Pascal Brendel, Nils Dunkel, Nick Klessing, and Lucas Kochan; together they finished sixth as a team. Individually, Dauser finished sixteenth in the all-around and won gold on parallel bars. In doing so he became the first person from a unified Germany to become World Champion on the apparatus; previously Sylvio Kroll had won while representing East Germany.

=== 2024 ===
In early April, Dauser competed at the Osijek World Challenge Cup where he placed first on the parallel bars. Dauser competed at the German national championships where he placed first ahead of Andreas Toba and Timo Eder. Two weeks later, while competing at the final German Olympic trial, Dauser injured his right upper arm while competing on the still rings. Despite being diagnosed with a muscle injury, he was still named to the team to compete at the 2024 Olympic Games alongside Toba, Eder, Nils Dunkel, and Pascal Brendel.

At the Olympic Games, Dauser was only able to compete on floor exercise and parallel bars. He helped Germany finish eleventh as a team during qualifications, and individually he qualified for the parallel bars final. During the final, he placed seventh after hitting his leg on the apparatus. Afterwards Dauser announced that he would retire from the sport at the end of the year.

== Competitive history ==
Competitive history of Lukas Dauser
Year	Event	Team	AA	FX	PH	SR	VT	PB	HB
2014	Cottbus Challenge Cup							10	
2014	Anadia Challenge Cup							6	
2014	National Championships		3rd place, bronze medalist(s)				3rd place, bronze medalist(s)		
2014	World Championships	8							
2015	Cottbus Challenge Cup							14	
2015	European Championships							13	
2015	São Paulo Challenge Cup							1st place, gold medalist(s)	
2016	Cottbus World Cup							3rd place, bronze medalist(s)	
2016	Olympic Test Event	1st place, gold medalist(s)						4	
2016	São Paulo Challenge Cup			5	6			8	6
2016	National Championships							1st place, gold medalist(s)	2nd place, silver medalist(s)
2016	Olympic Games	7							
2016	Cottbus World Cup							4	
2017	American Cup		9						
2017	Stuttgart World Cup		6						
2017	London World Cup		3rd place, bronze medalist(s)						
2017	European Championships		7					2nd place, silver medalist(s)	
2017	National Championships		1st place, gold medalist(s)						
2018
2018	World Championships	R2	24					8	
2018	Cottbus World Cup							8	
2019
2019	European Championships							R2	
2019	World Championships	12						8	
2019	Cottbus World Cup							4	
2021
2021	European Championships		17					3rd place, bronze medalist(s)	
2021	National Championships		1st place, gold medalist(s)	1st place, gold medalist(s)	2nd place, silver medalist(s)			1st place, gold medalist(s)	2nd place, silver medalist(s)
2021	Olympic Games	8	18					2nd place, silver medalist(s)	
2022
2022	European Championships	7	9					8	
2022	National Championships		1st place, gold medalist(s)						
2022	World Championships	R1	11					2nd place, silver medalist(s)	
2023
2023	World Championships	6	16					1st place, gold medalist(s)	
2023	Swiss Cup	7							
2024	Osijek Challenge Cup							1st place, gold medalist(s)	
2024	Olympic Games	11						7	
2024	Swiss Cup	7							
