= Andreas Toba =

German artistic gymnast

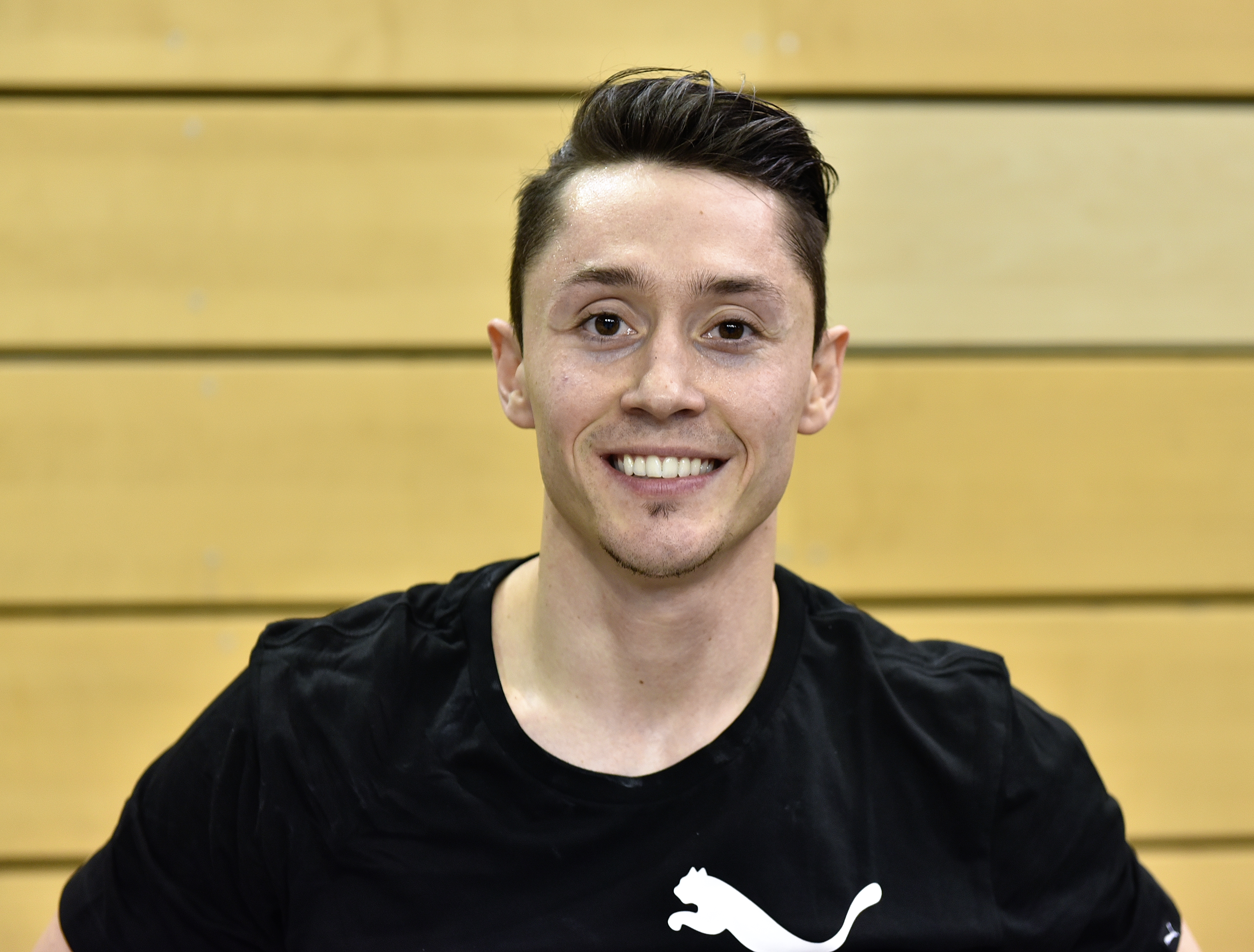
- Toba in 2017

Personal information
- Born: 7 October 1990 (age 36) Hanover, Germany
- Height: 1.72 m (5 ft 8 in)
- Relatives: Marius Tobă (father)

Gymnastics career
- Country represented: Germany; (2008–2025)
- Club: TK Hanover
- Head coach: Andreas Hirsch
- Retired: May 31, 2025
Medal record
Men's artistic gymnastics
Representing Germany
European Championships
Silver medal – second place	2021 Basel	Horizontal Bar
Silver medal – second place	2025 Leipzig	Horizontal Bar
FIG World Cup
Event / 1st / 2nd / 3rd; World Challenge Cup / 0 / 0 / 1

Andreas Toba (born 7 October 1990 in Hanover) is a German former artistic gymnast. He is a four-time Olympian, having represented Germany at the 2012, 2016, 2020, and 2024 Olympic Games.

== Early life ==
Toba was born on 7 October 1990 in Hanover and is the son of former Romanian-German gymnast Marius Tobă, who competed at three Olympic Games from 1988 to 2000.

== Gymnastics career ==
=== 2008–2012 ===
At the 2008 Junior European Championships in Lausanne, Toba won the bronze medal with the German team. Individually, he placed seventh on the high bar and ninth in the all-around, respectively.

Toba joined the German senior national team in 2009. At the 2009 German Championships, he placed sixth in the all-around; the next year he placed seventh. In 2011, he won bronze on the high bar and placed fourth on the parallel bars and on the pommel horse.

He was selected to represent Germany at the 2012 Olympic Games alongside Philipp Boy, Fabian Hambüchen, Sebastian Krimmer, and Marcel Nguyen. Together they finished seventh as a team.

=== 2013–2016 ===
At the 2013 European Championships, Toba finished seventh in the all-around. He made his World Championships debut later that year; however, he did not qualify for any finals. At the 2014 European Championships, Toba helped Germany finish fourth. At the 2014 World Championships, Toba helped Germany finish eighth as a team. Individually, he finished sixteenth in the all-around.

In 2015 Toba competed at the São Paulo World Challenge Cup where he won bronze on pommel horse behind Xiao Ruoteng and Zhang Hongtao. He next competed at the 2015 European Games where he helped Germany finish fifth. At the 2016 Olympic Test Event, Toba helped Germany finish first as a team. As a result, they qualified a full team to the 2016 Olympic Games.

At the 2016 Olympic Games, Toba competed in on floor exercise in which he sustained an anterior cruciate ligament injury. Later, though visibly injured, he completed a pommel horse routine and helped Germany qualify for the finals.

=== 2017–2021 ===
Andreas Toba celebrated his comeback as a member of the German national team after a long and hard rehabilitation period at the 2017 World Championships in October 2017. He performed on 2 apparatus (pommel horse with 12,933 points and still rings with 12,900 points).

Toba competed at the 2018 and 2019 World Championships; although Germany failed to qualify for the team final at both, they did manage to qualify a full team for the 2020 Olympic Games at the latter.

In 2020, Toba was selected to compete at the American Cup, an event his father, Marius Tobă, won in 1988. At the competition Toba placed twelfth. The remainder of competitions in 2020 were either canceled or postponed, including the Olympic Games, due to the global COVID-19 pandemic.

Toba returned to competition at the 2021 European Championships. He won silver on horizontal bar behind David Belyavskiy. In June Toba was selected for his third Olympic team alongside Lukas Dauser, Nils Dunkel, and Philipp Herder. At the 2020 Olympic Games Toba helped Germany finish eighth during the team finals.

=== 2022–2025 ===
Toba competed at the European Championships in 2022, 2023, 2024 and 2025. He competed at the 2023 DTB Pokal Mixed Cup, where he helped Germany win silver behind the team from Japan. During podium training at the 2023 World Championships, Toba injured his knee and was unable to compete. Despite being unable to compete, Germany still managed to qualify a full team to the upcoming Olympic Games in Paris.

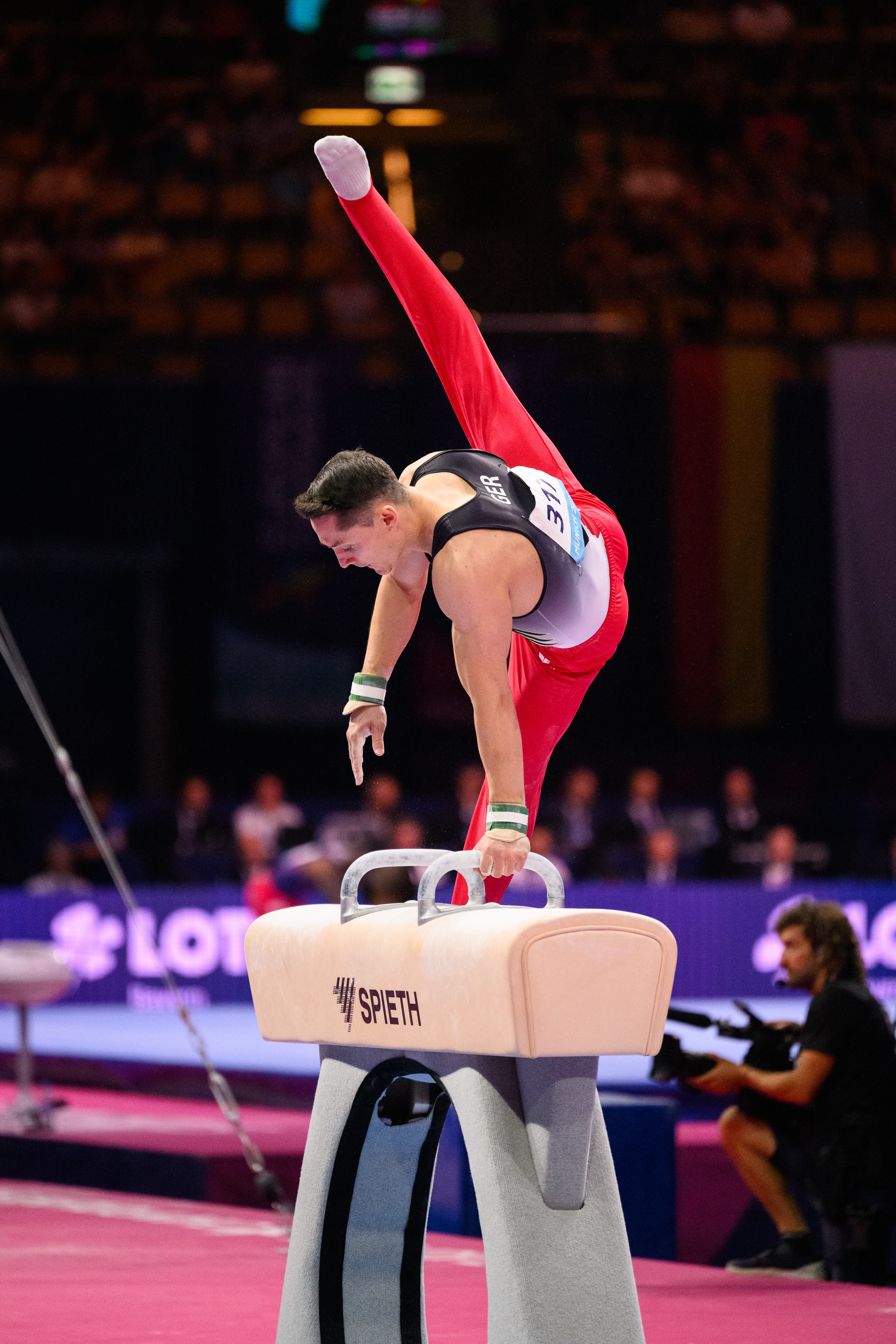
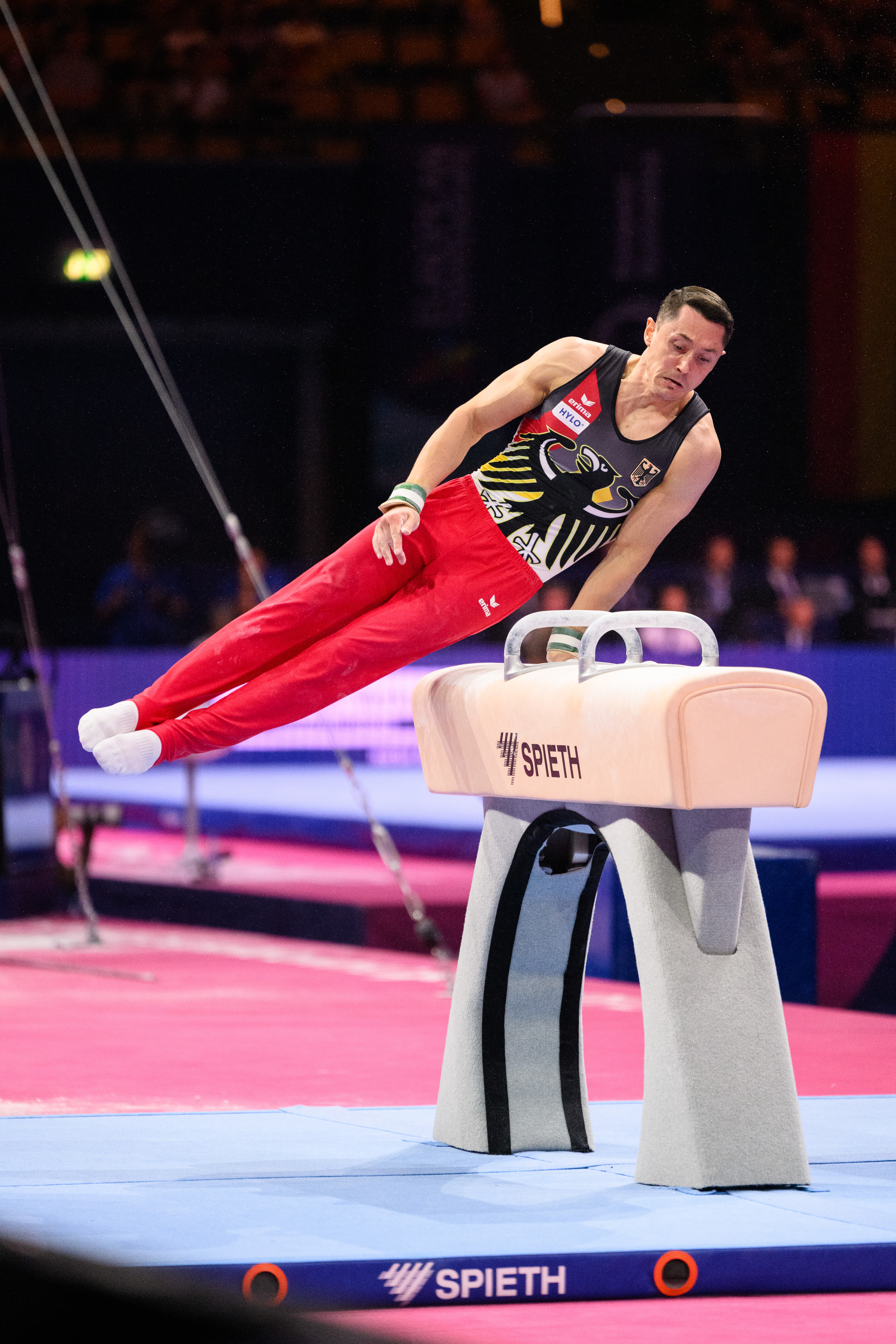
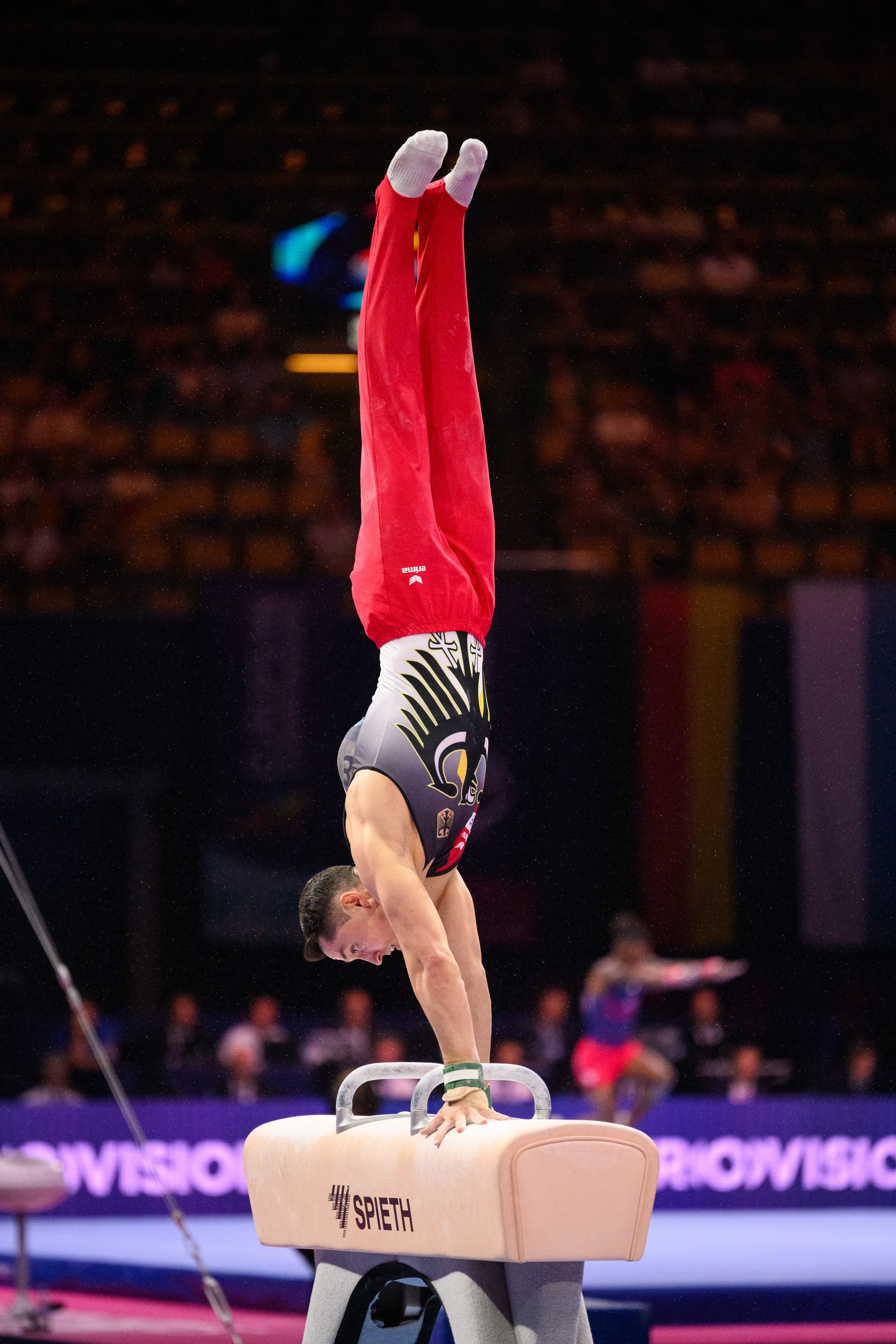
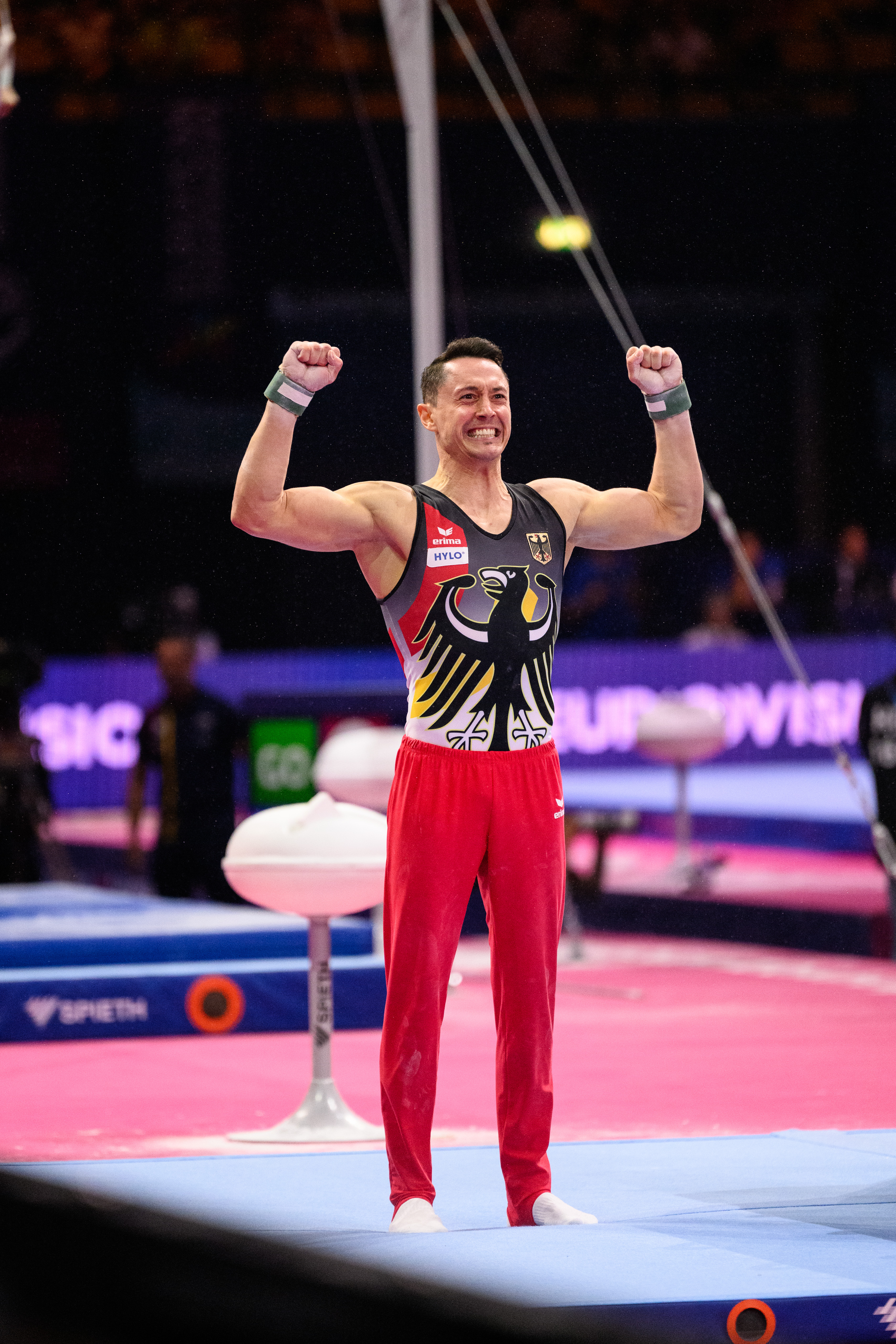
Toba competing on pommel horse at the 2022 European Championships

In June 2024 Toba competed at the German national championships where he placed second behind Lukas Dauser. Later that month he was named to the team to compete at the 2024 Olympic Games alongside Dauser, Timo Eder, Nils Dunkel, and Pascal Brendel. At the Olympic Games Germany finished eleventh as a team during qualifications.

Toba competed for the final time at the 2025 European Championships in Leipzig. While there, he won the silver medal on the horizontal bar behind Robert Tvorogal. During these championships, Toba announced his retirement from gymnastics.

== Competitive history ==
Competitive history of Andreas Toba
Year	Event	Team	AA	FX	PH	SR	VT	PB	HB
2008
2008	Junior European Championships	3rd place, bronze medalist(s)							7
2009	German Championships		6						
2010	German Championships		7						
2011	German Championships		4		4			4	3rd place, bronze medalist(s)
2012	Doha World Challenge Cup					5			
2012	German Championships				3rd place, bronze medalist(s)	2nd place, silver medalist(s)			2nd place, silver medalist(s)
2012	Olympic Games	7							
2013	German Championships		2nd place, silver medalist(s)		2nd place, silver medalist(s)	3rd place, bronze medalist(s)	3rd place, bronze medalist(s)		
2013	European Championships		7						
2013	World Championships				27	35			
2014	Cottbus World Challenge Cup						6		8
2014	German Championships		2nd place, silver medalist(s)			3rd place, bronze medalist(s)			3rd place, bronze medalist(s)
2014	European Championships	4							
2014	World Championships	8	16						
2015	German Championships		2nd place, silver medalist(s)						3rd place, bronze medalist(s)
2015	São Paulo World Challenge Cup				3rd place, bronze medalist(s)	5	8		4
2015	European Games	5							
2015	World Championships	R1							
2016	Cottbus World Cup					8			6
2016	Olympic Test Event	1st place, gold medalist(s)							
2016	European Championships	5							
2016	German Championships		1st place, gold medalist(s)			1st place, gold medalist(s)			
2016	Olympic Games	7							
2017
2017	World Championships				47				
2017	Cottbus World Challenge Cup					8			
2018
2018	European Championships	4							
2018	German Championships		2nd place, silver medalist(s)			1st place, gold medalist(s)		3rd place, bronze medalist(s)	
2018	World Championships	R2							
2019
2019	European Championships		11						
2019	German Championships		1st place, gold medalist(s)			2nd place, silver medalist(s)		3rd place, bronze medalist(s)	1st place, gold medalist(s)
2019	World Championships	12	19						
2019	Swiss Cup	4							
2020	American Cup		12						
2021
2021	European Championships								2nd place, silver medalist(s)
2021	German Championships		3rd place, bronze medalist(s)		3rd place, bronze medalist(s)	2nd place, silver medalist(s)			
2021	Olympic Games	8							
2022	German Championships							3rd place, bronze medalist(s)	2nd place, silver medalist(s)
2022	European Championships	7							
2022	World Championships	9							
2023	DTB Pokal Team Challenge	12				6			
2023	DTB Pokal Mixed Cup	2nd place, silver medalist(s)							
2023	European Championships	5							
2023	German Championships								1st place, gold medalist(s)
2024	DTB Pokal Team Challenge	5							6
2024	European Championships	9							
2024	German Championships		2nd place, silver medalist(s)		3rd place, bronze medalist(s)	2nd place, silver medalist(s)		3rd place, bronze medalist(s)	1st place, gold medalist(s)
2024	Olympic Games	11							
2025
2025	European Championships	4							2nd place, silver medalist(s)
2026	German Championships		3rd place, bronze medalist(s)			4			3rd place, bronze medalist(s)

== Awards and honours ==
- Bambi Award: 2016
- Sport personality of the year — Sparkasse Award for the cult-figure of sport: 2016
- An athlete with a heart: 2016
- Solidarity Award of Manfred von Richthofen: 2016
