= Gymnastics at the 2020 Summer Olympics – Men's parallel bars =

Olympic gymnastics event

Men's parallel bars at the Games of the XXXII Olympiad
- Olympic artistic gymnastics
- Venue: Ariake Gymnastics Centre
- Date: 24 July 2021 (qualifying); 3 August 2021 (final)
- Competitors: 8 from 7 nations
- Winning score: 16.233 points

Medalists
1st place, gold medalist(s)		Zou Jingyuan	China
2nd place, silver medalist(s)		Lukas Dauser	Germany
3rd place, bronze medalist(s)		Ferhat Arıcan	Turkey

The men's parallel bars event at the 2020 Summer Olympics was held on 24 July and 3 August 2021 at the Ariake Gymnastics Centre. Approximately 70 gymnasts from 35 nations (of the 98 total gymnasts) competed on parallel bars in the qualifying round.

Zou Jingyuan of China won the title for his first individual Olympic medal. Germany's Lukas Dauser earned the silver for his first Olympic medal. Ferhat Arıcan of Turkey rounded off the podium in bronze, earning not only his first Olympic medal, but also the first for his country in artistic gymnastics. The defending champion, Oleg Verniaiev from Ukraine, did not enter the competition as he was serving a doping ban.

The medals for the competition were presented by Jean-Christophe Rolland, Olympian, France; IOC Member, and the medalists' bouquets were presented by Luo Chaoyi, People's Republic of China; FIG Executive Committee Member.

== Background ==
This was the 25th appearance of the event, which is one of the five apparatus events held every time there were apparatus events at the Summer Olympics (no apparatus events were held in 1900, 1908, 1912, or 1920).

== Qualification ==
A National Olympic Committee (NOC) could enter up to 6 qualified gymnasts: a team of 4 and up to 2 specialists. A total of 98 quota places are allocated to men's gymnastics.

The 12 teams that qualify will be able to send 4 gymnasts in the team competition, for a total of 48 of the 98 quota places. The top three teams at the 2018 World Artistic Gymnastics Championships (China, Russia, and Japan) and the top nine teams (excluding those already qualified) at the 2019 World Artistic Gymnastics Championships (Ukraine, Great Britain, Switzerland, the United States, Chinese Taipei, South Korea, Brazil, Spain, and Germany) earned team qualification places.

The remaining 50 quota places are awarded individually. Each gymnast can only earn one place, except that gymnasts that competed with a team that qualified are eligible to earn a second place through the 2020 All Around World Cup Series. Some of the individual events are open to gymnasts from NOCs with qualified teams, while others are not. These places are filled through various criteria based on the 2019 World Championships, the 2020 FIG Artistic Gymnastics World Cup series, continental championships, a host guarantee, and a Tripartite Commission invitation.

Each of the 98 qualified gymnasts are eligible for the pommel horse competition, but many gymnasts do not compete in each of the apparatus events.

The COVID-19 pandemic delayed many of the events for qualifying for gymnastics. The 2018 and 2019 World Championships were completed on time, but many of the World Cup series events were delayed into 2021.

== Competition format ==
The top 8 qualifiers in the qualification phase (limit two per NOC) advance to the apparatus final. The finalists perform an additional exercise. Qualification scores are then ignored, with only final round scores counting.

== Schedule ==
The competition is held over two days, 24 July and 3 August. The qualifying round (for all men's gymnastics events) is the first day; the apparatus final is on the second day.

Date	Time	Round	Subdivision
24 July	10:00	Qualification	Subdivision 1
24 July	14:30	Qualification	Subdivision 2
24 July	19:30	Qualification	Subdivision 3
3 August	17:00	Final	–
All times are local time (UTC+09:00).

== Results ==
=== Qualifying ===
Rank	Gymnast	D Score	E Score	Pen.	Total	Qual.
1	Zou Jingyuan (CHN)	6.8	9.366		16.166	Q
2	Lukas Dauser (GER)	6.7	9.033		15.733	Q
3	You Hao (CHN)	6.8	8.866		15.666	Q
4	Ferhat Arıcan (TUR)	7.0	8.566		15.566	Q
5	Sam Mikulak (USA)	6.4	9.033		15.433	Q
6	Xiao Ruoteng (CHN)	6.4	9.000		15.400	–
7	Joe Fraser (GBR)	6.6	8.800		15.400	Q
8	Petro Pakhniuk (UKR)	6.6	8.733		15.333	Q
9	David Belyavskiy (ROC)	6.6	8.725		15.325	Q
10	Daiki Hashimoto (JPN)	6.2	9.100		15.300	R1
11	Wataru Tanigawa (JPN)	6.4	8.841		15.241	R2
12	Artur Dalaloyan (ROC)	6.4	8.833		15.233	R3

Reserves

The reserves for the men's parallel bars final were:

1. Daiki Hashimoto (JPN)
2. Wataru Tanigawa (JPN)
3. Artur Dalaloyan (ROC)

Only two gymnasts from each country may advance to the event final. Gymnasts who did not qualify for the final because of the quota, but had high enough scores to do so were:

- Xiao Ruoteng (CHN)

=== Final ===
Rank	Gymnast	D Score	E Score	Pen.	Total
1st place, gold medalist(s)	Zou Jingyuan (CHN)	6.9	9.333		16.233
2nd place, silver medalist(s)	Lukas Dauser (GER)	6.7	9.000		15.700
3rd place, bronze medalist(s)	Ferhat Arıcan (TUR)	7.0	8.633		15.633
4	You Hao (CHN)	6.9	8.566		15.466
5	David Belyavskiy (ROC)	6.6	8.600		15.200
6	Sam Mikulak (USA)	6.4	8.600		15.000
7	Petro Pakhniuk (UKR)	6.1	8.433		14.533
8	Joe Fraser (GBR)	6.1	8.400		14.500
