= Gymnastics at the 2016 Summer Olympics – Men's horizontal bar =

Men's horizontal bar at the Games of the XXXI Olympiad
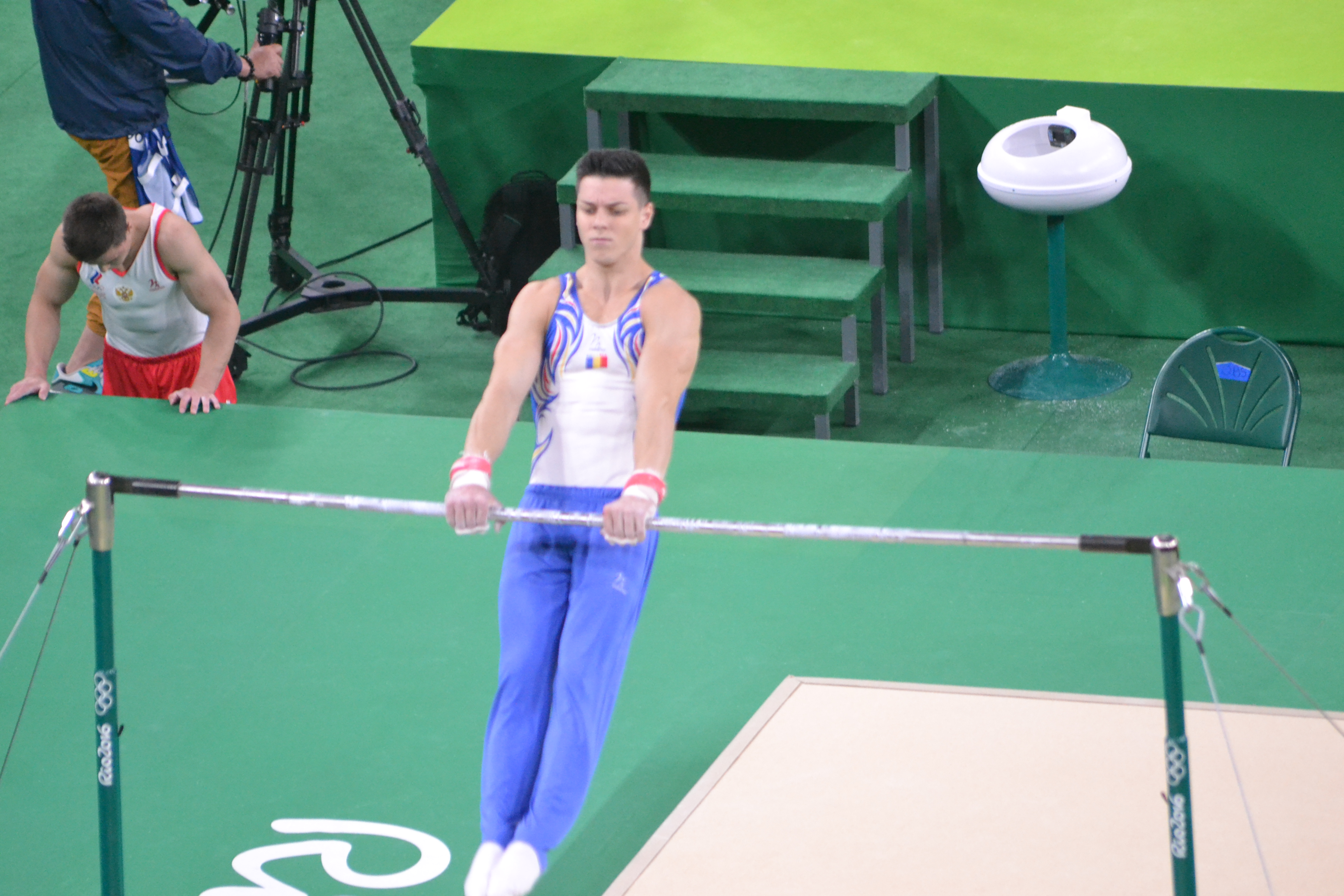
- Andrei Muntean competing on the high bar in the qualifying round
- Venue: HSBC Arena
- Dates: 6 August (qualifying); 16 August (final)
- Competitors: 71 from 34 nations
- Winning score: 15.766

Medalists
1st place, gold medalist(s)		Fabian Hambüchen; Germany
2nd place, silver medalist(s)		Danell Leyva; United States
3rd place, bronze medalist(s)		Nile Wilson; Great Britain

The men's horizontal bar competition at the 2016 Summer Olympics was held at the HSBC Arena on 6 and 16 August. There were 71 competitors from 34 nations. The event was won by Fabian Hambüchen of Germany, the nation's first victory in the horizontal bar since 1996 and third overall. Danell Leyva won the United States' third silver medal in four Games in the event; Nile Wilson's bronze was Great Britain's first-ever medal in the horizontal bar.

The medals were presented by Claudia Bokel IOC member, Germany and Naomi Valenzo, FIG Executive Committee Member.

== Background ==
This was the 24th appearance of the event, which is one of the five apparatus events held every time there were apparatus events at the Summer Olympics (no apparatus events were held in 1900, 1908, 1912, or 1920). Four of the eight finalists from 2012 returned: gold medalist Epke Zonderland of the Netherlands, silver medalist Fabian Hambüchen of Germany, fourth-place finisher Zhang Chenglong of China, and fifth-place finisher Danell Leyva of the United States. Kōhei Uchimura of Japan was the reigning (2015) world champion, with Leyva the runner-up and Manrique Larduet of Cuba third. Zonderland had won in 2013 and 2014; Uchimura had reached the podium in those years as well.

Cyprus, Lithuania, Monaco, and Turkey each made their debut in the men's horizontal bar. The United States made its 22nd appearance, most of any nation; the Americans had missed only the inaugural 1896 event and the boycotted 1980 Games.

== Qualification ==
Qualification for the men's artistic gymnastics in 2016 was based primarily on the 2015 World Artistic Gymnastics Championships. The top 8 teams at the world championships could send a full team of 5 gymnasts to the Olympics. The next 8 teams (#9 through #16) competed in the 2012 Gymnastics Olympic Test Event, with the top 4 of those teams also qualifying a team of 5 gymnasts for the Olympics. The individual apparatus medalists from the World Championships also qualified, if their nation had not already qualified a team. There were places reserved for host country and continental representation, and the Tripartite Commission made an invitation. The quota of 98 gymnasts was then filled through the individual all-around rankings at the Test Event, with each nation able to qualify only one gymnast in that manner (though this one gymnast could be added to the world championship apparatus medalists—for example, Romania qualified Marian Drăgulescu as silver medalist on vault and Andrei Muntean through Test Event).

== Competition format ==
The top 8 qualifiers in the qualification phase (with a maximum of two per NOC), advanced to the individual all-around final. The finalists performed on each apparatus again. Qualification scores do not count in the final.

== Schedule ==
All times are Brasília Time (UTC-03:00)

Date	Time	Round
Wednesday, 6 August 2016	11:00	Qualifying
Saturday, 16 August 2016	15:34	Final

== Results ==
=== Qualifying ===
The gymnasts who ranked top eight qualified for final round. In case of there were more than two gymnasts in same NOC, the last ranked among them would not qualify to final round. The next best ranked gymnast would qualify instead.

=== Final ===
Rank	Gymnast	Nation	D Score	E Score	Pen.	Total
1st place, gold medalist(s)	Fabian Hambüchen	Germany	7.300	8.466		15.766
2nd place, silver medalist(s)	Danell Leyva	United States	7.300	8.200		15.500
3rd place, bronze medalist(s)	Nile Wilson	Great Britain	6.800	8.666		15.466
4	Sam Mikulak	United States	6.800	8.600		15.400
5	Francisco Barreto Júnior	Brazil	6.900	8.308		15.208
6	Manrique Larduet	Cuba	7.000	8.033		15.033
7	Epke Zonderland	Netherlands	6.900	7.133		14.033
8	Oleg Verniaiev	Ukraine	6.300	7.066		13.366
