= Marcel Nguyen =

German artistic gymnast

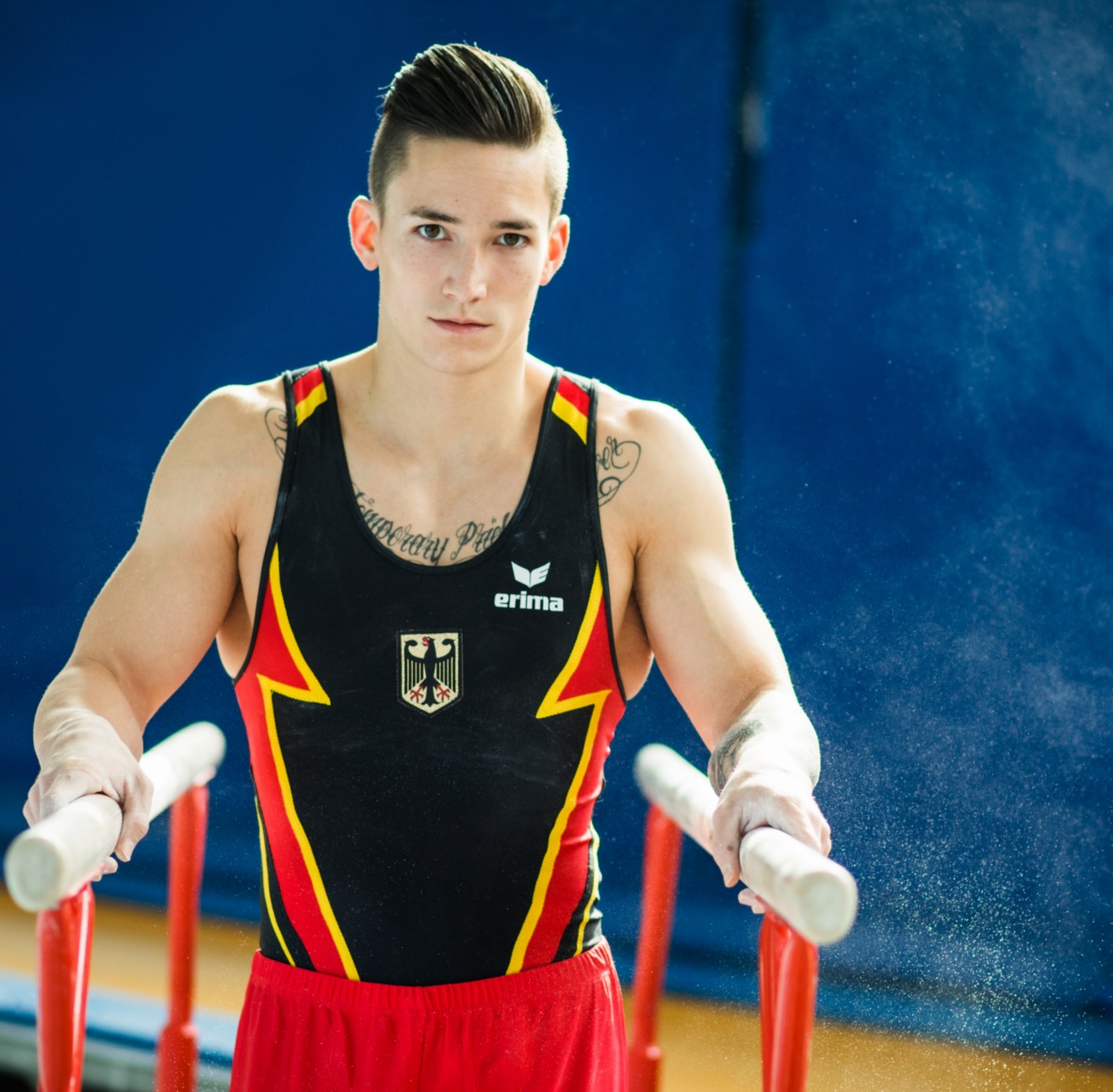
- Nguyen in 2014

Personal information
- Full name: Marcel Van Minh Phuc Long Nguyen
- Born: 8 September 1987 (age 39) Munich, West Germany
- Height: 165 cm (5 ft 5 in)

Gymnastics career
- Discipline: Men's artistic gymnastics
- Country represented: Germany; (2002–2022)
- Club: KTV Straubenhardt/TSV Unterhaching
- Head coach: Valery Belenky
- Retired: 14 March 2023
Medal record
Representing Germany
Olympic Games
Silver medal – second place	2012 London	All-Around
Silver medal – second place	2012 London	Parallel Bars
World Championships
Bronze medal – third place	2007 Stuttgart	Team
European Championships
Gold medal – first place	2010 Birmingham	Team
Gold medal – first place	2011 Berlin	Parallel Bars
Gold medal – first place	2012 Montpellier	Parallel Bars
Silver medal – second place	2008 Lausanne	Team
Bronze medal – third place	2010 Birmingham	Floor Exercise
Bronze medal – third place	2011 Berlin	Horizontal Bar
Bronze medal – third place	2016 Bern	Parallel Bars
FIG World Cup
Event	1st	2nd	3rd
All-Around World Cup	2	1	2
Apparatus World Cup	2	1	2
Total	4	2	4
- Vietnamese alphabet: Nguyễn Văn Minh Phúc Long
- Chữ Hán: 阮文明福龍

Marcel Van Minh Phuc Long Nguyen (born 8 September 1987) is a retired German artistic gymnast and three-time Olympian, having represented Germany at the 2008, 2012, and 2016 Olympic Games. He is the 2012 Olympic silver medalist in the all-around and on parallel bars, as well as the 2011 and 2012 European Champion on the latter. He has been a soldier in the Bundeswehr (German military) since July 2007, beginning when he was training in the Bundeswehr Sports Development Group (Sportfördergruppe der Bundeswehr) in Munich.

== Early life ==
Nguyen was born in Munich, West Germany, in 1987 to a German mother and a Central Vietnamese father. He has one sister.

== Gymnastics career ==
Nguyen began gymnastics at the age of four, and at seven years of age, joined TSV Unterhaching. Since 1995, he has trained at the regional training center in Munich. Since 1997, Nguyen was part of the squad perspective, where Andreas Hirsch and Jens Milbradt were his coaches. He rose quickly from the D- to B-squad. Since 2002, he has started for the Junior National Team.

=== 2005–2008 ===
In 2005, Nguyen was the German junior champion on parallel bars, runner-up on rings and third in the vault. That same year he took part in the World Championships for the first time. During qualifications, he placed sixteenth on parallel bars but did not qualify for the event finals. Nguyen competed at the 2006 World Championships where he helped Germany finish seventh in the team final. Nguyen competed at the 2007 World Championships where he helped Germany win the team bronze medal.

Nguyen competed at the 2008 Olympic Games in Beijing, where he helped Germany place fourth in the team final. Individually, he did not qualify for any event finals.

=== 2009–2011 ===
In 2009, Marcel finished second in the Champions Trophy and the German Championship. This was followed by winning the title in the German National league with KTV Straubenhard.

In 2010, Nguyen competed at the European Championships where he helped Germany win team gold. Individually, he won bronze on floor exercise and placed sixth on vault and still rings. Later that year he broke the fibula in his right leg at a friendly meet between Germany, Switzerland, and Romania.

Nguyen returned to competition at the 2011 European Championships. He won the gold medal on parallel bars, making him the first German gymnast to have won this event title since 1955. He later competed at the 2011 World Championships where he helped Germany place sixth in the team final and individually he placed eighth in the all-around.

=== 2012 ===
Nguyen competed at the 2012 American Cup where he placed third behind Danell Leyva and Nikolai Kuksenkov. At the European Championships Nguyen retained his parallel bars title.

Nguyen was selected to represent Germany at the 2012 Summer Olympics alongside Philipp Boy, Fabian Hambüchen, Andreas Toba, and Sebastian Krimmer. At the 2012 Olympic Games Nguyen helped the German team finish seventh in the team final. Individually, he won two silver medals, the first in the men's all-around behind Kōhei Uchimura and later on parallel bars behind Feng Zhe. Additionally, he finished eighth in the floor exercise final. By winning an Olympic all-around medal Nguyen became the first German to win an all-around medal for Germany since the 1936 Olympic Games held in Berlin.

=== 2013–2015 ===
At the European Championships in 2014, he placed 4th on the team, but failed to qualify for any of the individual finals. In September 2014, he was at the home championships in Stuttgart on parallel bars and rings which is where he tore his ACL.

Although the German team was not directly qualified for the Olympic Games 2016, Nguyen participated in the Test Event of Olympic Games in April 2016. The German team won that round and got the right to participate in the Olympics. That was the 7th title of Nguyen on this apparatus. For the first time since 2009, he did not win the gold medal on the parallel bars and stayed second behind his teammate Lukas Dauser.

=== 2016 ===
Olympic Games 2016 brought Nguyen and his team the 7th place in overall teams ranking. During his routine on parallel bars, the new element was shown – "The Nguyen" was added to the Code of Points (with a grade "E") and brings 0.5 points to the athlete who completes it without mistake.

=== 2017 ===
In March, Nguyen competed at the Doha World Cup where he placed second on parallel bars behind Zou Jingyuan of China and placed sixth on still rings. He later competed at the 2017 European Championships and placed sixth on the parallel bars.

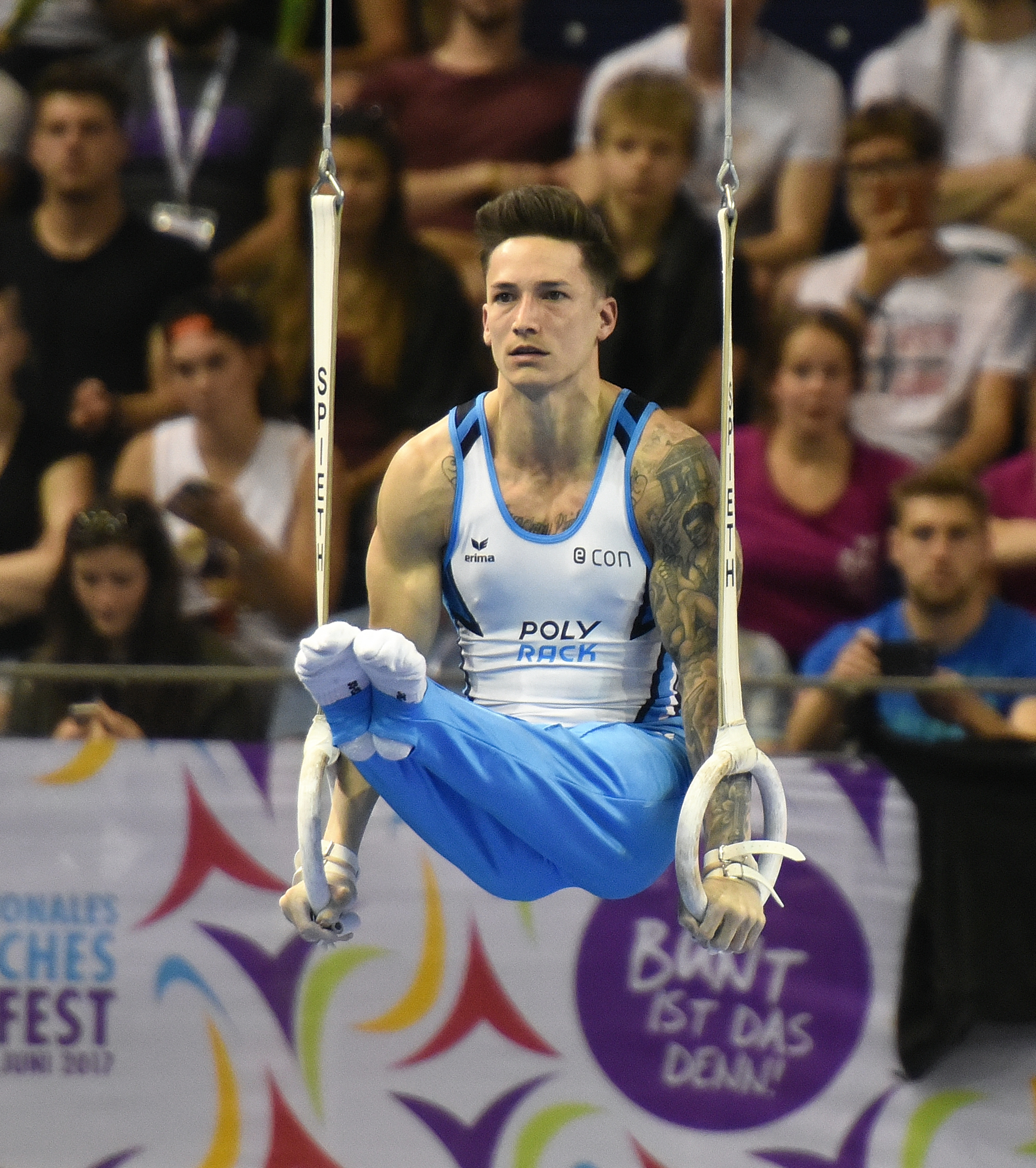
Rings

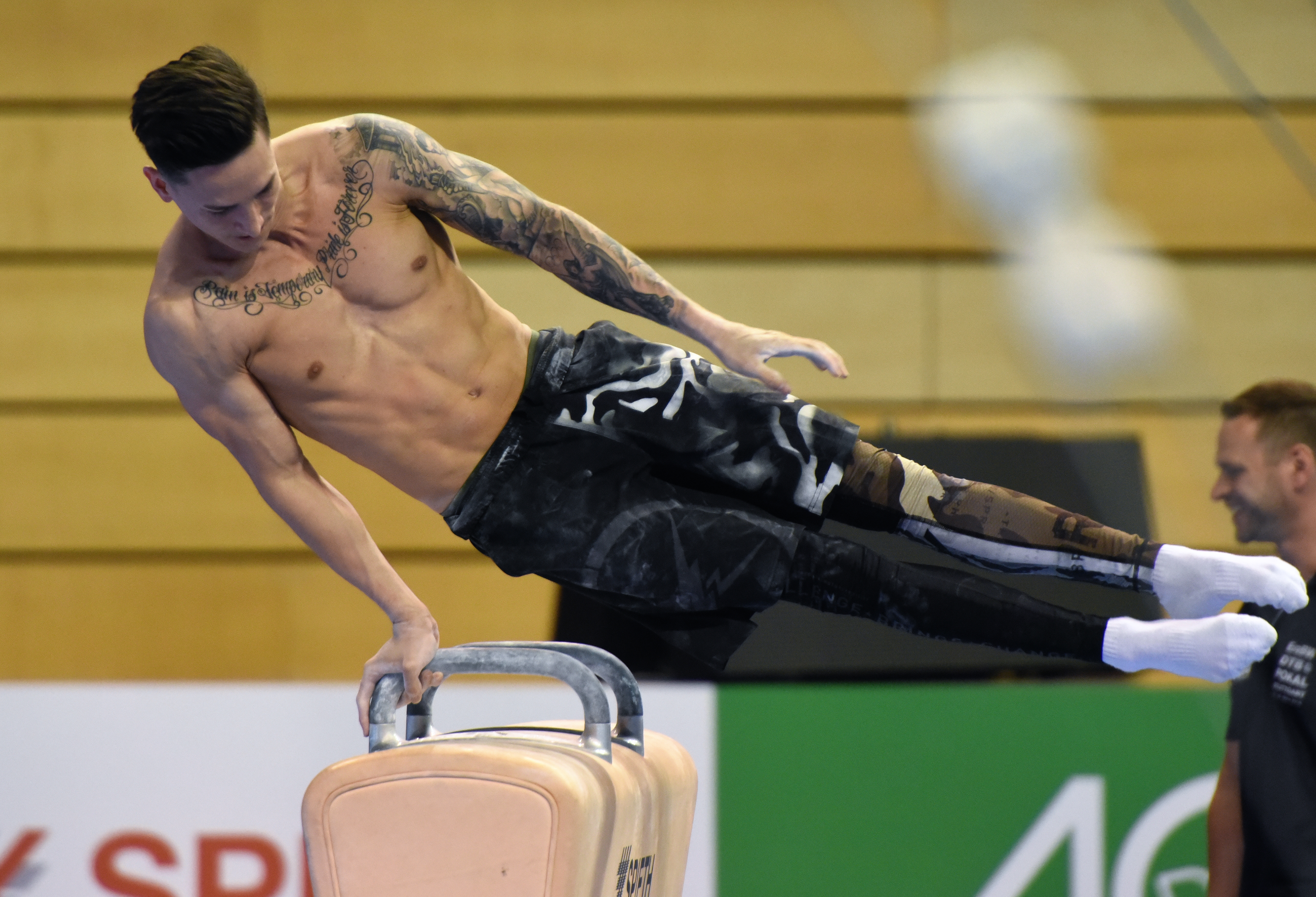
Pommel Horse

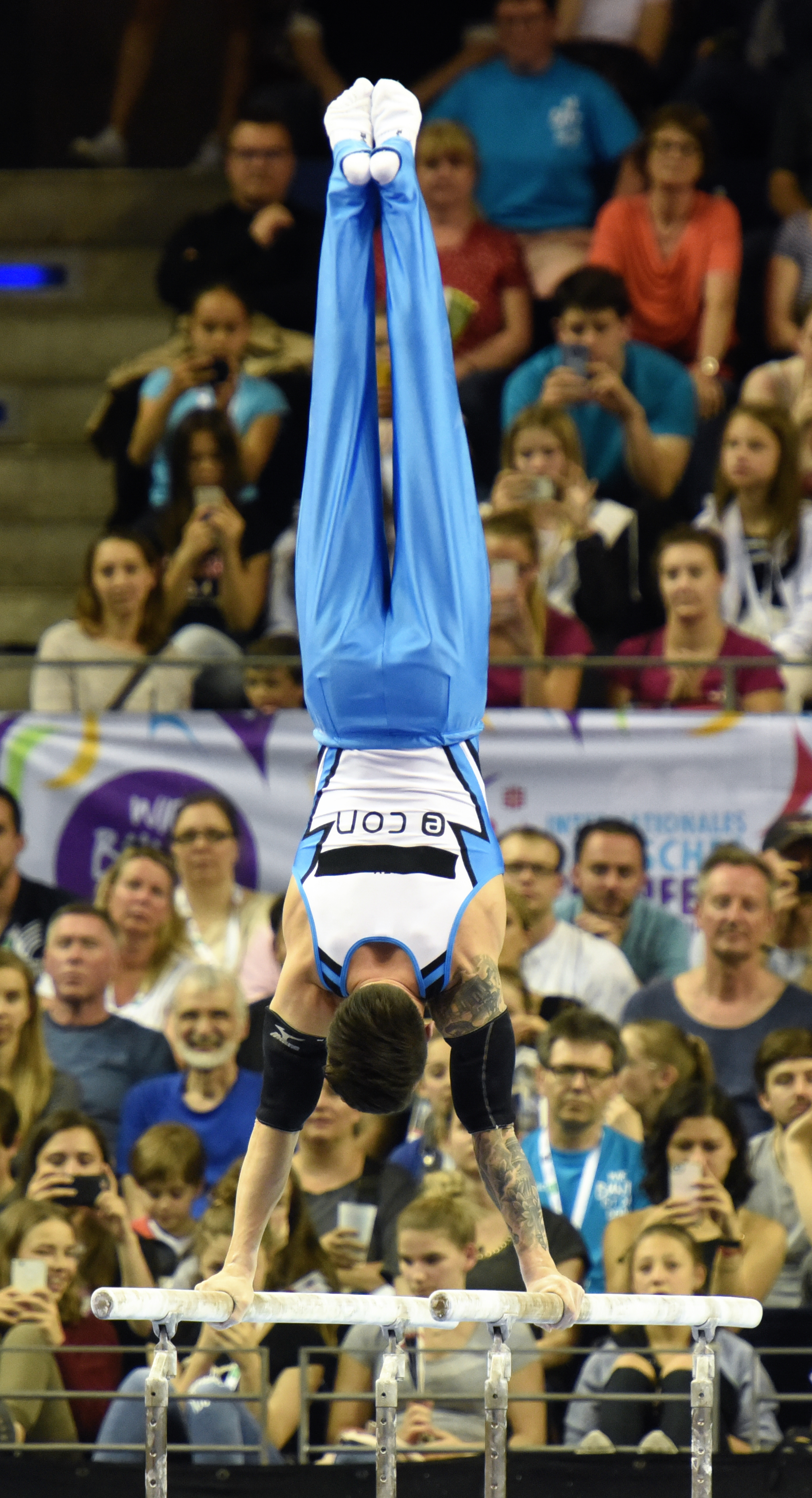
Parallel Bars

Nguyen at the 2017 International German Gymnastics Festival

In September, he competed at the Paris Challenge Cup where he placed fourth on parallel bars. In October Nguyen competed at the 2017 World Championships in Montreal and placed seventh on the parallel bars with a score of 14.700.

Following the World Championships he competed at the Arthur Gander Memorial where he won silver behind Oleg Verniaiev of Ukraine and placed fifth at the Swiss Cup where he was partnered with Elisabeth Seitz. Nguyen finished his season at the Cottbus World Cup where he won bronze on parallel bars and placed fifth on still rings.

=== 2018 ===
In March, Nguyen competed at the Stuttgart World Cup where he placed sixth. In August he represented Germany at the European Championships where he qualified to the floor exercise and rings event finals. He finished sixth on each. Additionally he helped Germany finish fourth as a team. The following month Nguyen competed at the German National Championships where he placed first in the all-around ahead of Andreas Toba.

Nguyen was selected to represent Germany at the 2018 World Championships in Doha, Qatar. As a team, Germany finished tenth in qualifications and were the second reserve. Individually, Nguyen qualified for the all-around final. During the final, he finished 20th. Nguyen later competed at the Arthur Gander Memorial where he finished first in the 4-event all-around. He next competed at the Swiss Cup where he was partnered with Elisabeth Seitz; together they finished first ahead of the Russian duo of Angelina Melnikova and Nikita Nagornyy. Nguyen ended the season competing at the Cottbus World Cup where he finished fifth on both floor exercise and parallel bars.

=== 2019 ===
Nguyen was scheduled to compete at the American Cup but withdrew due to injury. After he recovered he competed at the Stuttgart World Cup where he finished fourth behind Artur Dalaloyan, Sun Wei, and Petro Pakhniuk. Nguyen competed at the European Championships in April where he was the first reserve for the parallel bars. At the German National Championships Nguyen finished second in the all-around behind Andreas Toba but finished first on floor exercise and parallel bars. Additionally, he finished third on high bar and rings. Nguyen was selected to represent Germany at the 2019 World Championships; however he tore a tendon in his shoulder and had to withdraw.

=== 2021–2023 ===
In May 2021, Nguyen tore a cruciate ligament in his right knee, which ended his bid to compete at the upcoming Olympic Games in Tokyo.

Nguyen returned to competition in May of the following year and competed at the 2022 Varna Challenge Cup. He qualified for the rings, parallel bars, and horizontal bar finals.

On 14 March 2023 Nguyen announced his retirement from the sport.

== Post-gymnastics career ==
Nguyen appears on the January 3, 2025 episode of Ninja Warrior Germany. He was part of "Team Buschi", which also consisted of Mike Heiter, Christine Theiss, and Martin Schmitt; together they finished in first place. Nguyen appeared in season 4 of Die Verräter – Vertraue Niemandem! (The Traitors). He was a faithful and was banished in episode 2.

== Competitive history ==
Competitive history of Marcel Nguyen
Year	Event	Team	AA	FX	PH	SR	VT	PB	HB
2005	National Championships					2nd place, silver medalist(s)	3rd place, bronze medalist(s)		
2005	World Championships								
2006
2006	World Championships	7							
2007	National Championships							2nd place, silver medalist(s)	
2007	European Championships								
2007	World Championships	3rd place, bronze medalist(s)							
2008	National Championships			2nd place, silver medalist(s)				2nd place, silver medalist(s)	
2008	European Championships	2nd place, silver medalist(s)							
2008	Olympic Games	4							
2009	National Championships		2nd place, silver medalist(s)	2nd place, silver medalist(s)		2nd place, silver medalist(s)		2nd place, silver medalist(s)	
2009	World Championships		12						
2010	National Championships		1st place, gold medalist(s)				2nd place, silver medalist(s)	1st place, gold medalist(s)	
2010	European Championships	1st place, gold medalist(s)		3rd place, bronze medalist(s)			6	6	
2011	National Championships		2nd place, silver medalist(s)			1st place, gold medalist(s)		1st place, gold medalist(s)	
2011	European Championships		6					1st place, gold medalist(s)	3rd place, bronze medalist(s)
2011	World Championships	6	8						
2011	Stuttgart World Cup		2nd place, silver medalist(s)						
2012	American Cup		3rd place, bronze medalist(s)						
2012	National Championships		2nd place, silver medalist(s)	3rd place, bronze medalist(s)		1st place, gold medalist(s)	3rd place, bronze medalist(s)	1st place, gold medalist(s)	
2012	European Championships	6				6		1st place, gold medalist(s)	
2012	Olympic Games	7	2nd place, silver medalist(s)	8				2nd place, silver medalist(s)	
2012	Stuttgart World Cup		1st place, gold medalist(s)						
2012	Glasgow World Cup		1st place, gold medalist(s)						
2013	American Cup		3rd place, bronze medalist(s)						
2013	National Championships					1st place, gold medalist(s)		1st place, gold medalist(s)	
2013	European Championships					8		4	
2014	National Championships					1st place, gold medalist(s)		1st place, gold medalist(s)	
2014	Doha World Cup							1st place, gold medalist(s)	
2014	European Championships	4							
2015	National Championships					1st place, gold medalist(s)		1st place, gold medalist(s)	
2015	World Championships	R1							
2016	Cottbus World Cup							1st place, gold medalist(s)	
2016	Olympic Test Event	1st place, gold medalist(s)						6	
2016	European Championships	5						3rd place, bronze medalist(s)	
2016	National Championships		2nd place, silver medalist(s)	3rd place, bronze medalist(s)		1st place, gold medalist(s)		2nd place, silver medalist(s)	
2016	Olympic Games	7	19						
2016	Stuttgart World Cup		4						
2016	Swiss Cup	2nd place, silver medalist(s)							
2017	DTB Pokal Team Challenge	2nd place, silver medalist(s)							
2017	Doha World Cup					6		2nd place, silver medalist(s)	
2017	European Championships							6	
2017	National Championships					1st place, gold medalist(s)		1st place, gold medalist(s)	
2017	Paris Challenge Cup							4	
2017	World Championships							7	
2017	Arthur Gander Memorial		2nd place, silver medalist(s)						
2017	Swiss Cup	5							
2017	Cottbus World Cup					4		3rd place, bronze medalist(s)	
2018	Birmingham World Cup		6						
2018	European Championships	4		6		6			
2018	National Championships		1st place, gold medalist(s)						
2018	World Championships	R2	20						
2018	Arthur Gander Memorial		1st place, gold medalist(s)						
2018	Swiss Cup	1st place, gold medalist(s)							
2018	Cottbus World Cup			5				5	
2019
2019	European Championships							R1	
2019	National Championships		2nd place, silver medalist(s)	1st place, gold medalist(s)		3rd place, bronze medalist(s)		1st place, gold medalist(s)	3rd place, bronze medalist(s)
2022	Varna Challenge Cup					7		3rd place, bronze medalist(s)	
