= Pascal Brendel =

German gymnast (born 2003)

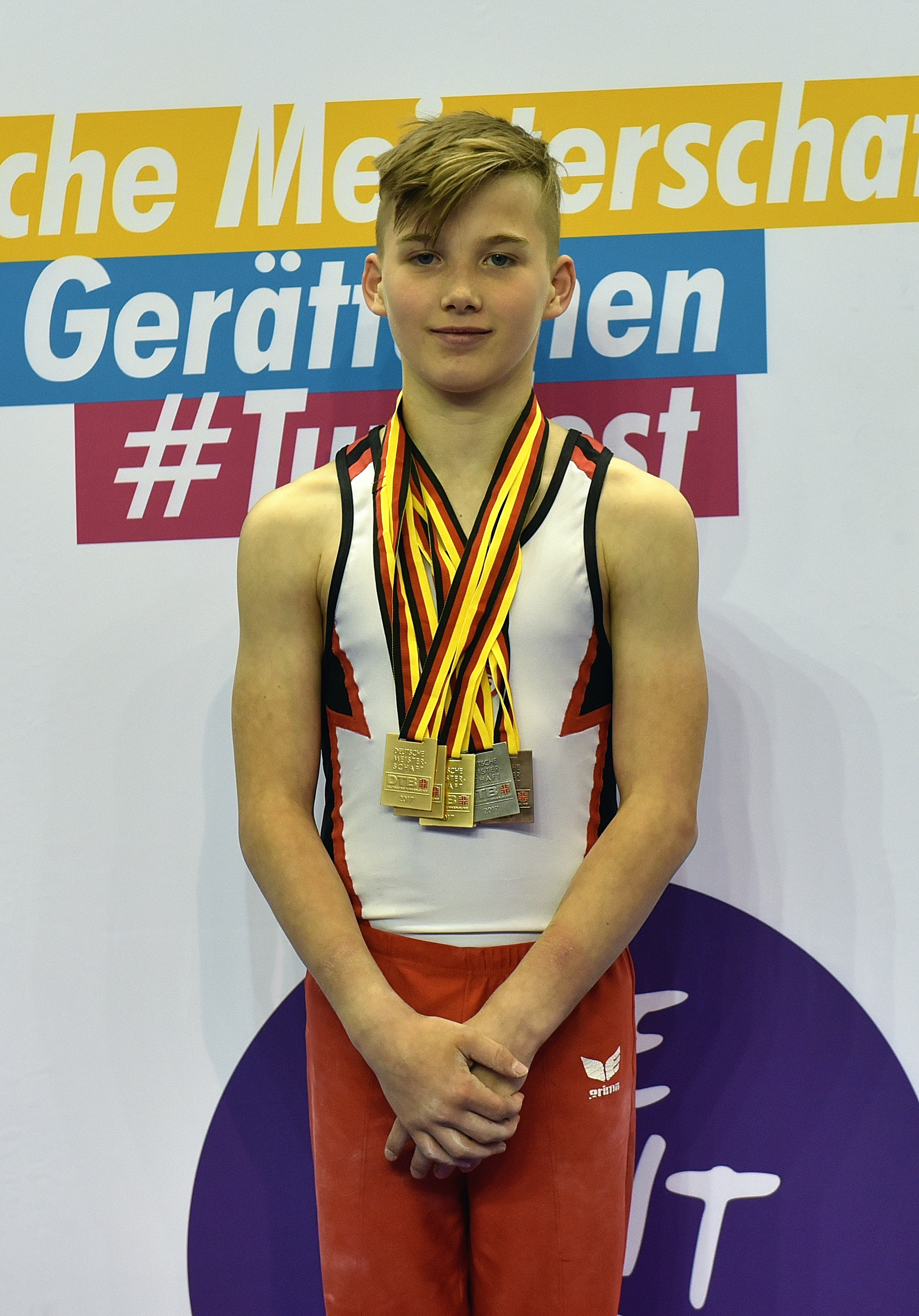
- Brendel in 2017

Personal information
- Born: 15 September 2003 (age 23) Bad Homburg, Germany

Gymnastics career
- Discipline: Men's artistic gymnastics
- Country represented: Germany; (2019–present)
- Club: KTV Straubenhardt
- Head coach: Matthias Brendel

Pascal Brendel (born 15 September 2003) is a German artistic gymnast. He represented Germany at the 2024 Summer Olympics.

== Early life ==
Brendel was born on 15 September 2003 in Bad Homburg, Germany, to Katharina and Matthias Brendel. He has a brother named Sascha who is four years older. He began artistic gymnastics in 2009 and moved to Frankfurt in 2012. He left his club in Frankfurt and moved to Straubenhardt in 2019 and is coached by his father.

== Gymnastics career ==
Brendel finished fifth on the parallel bars at the 2019 European Youth Olympic Festival, and he placed 14th in the all-around. He won the bronze medal in the all-around at the 2021 German Championships in the 17–18 age group.

Brendel won the pommel horse title at the 2022 German Championships, and he finished 14th in the all-around. He was initially Germany's reserve for the 2022 World Championships, but he was added to the team after Lucas Kochan withdrew for health reasons. He competed alongside Lukas Dauser, Nils Dunkel, Glenn Trebing, and Andreas Toba, and they placed ninth in the qualification round, making them the first reserves for the team final.

Brendel competed in the mixed team event at the 2023 DTB Pokal Stuttgart, helping Germany win the silver medal behind Japan. Then at the 2023 European Championships, he helped the German team finish fifth. Individually, he finished eighth in the all-around. He won his first senior national all-around title at the 2023 German Championships. He then competed at the 2023 World Championships and helped Germany qualify for the team final where they finished sixth.

At the 2024 DTB Pokal Stuttgart, Brendel won a silver medal on the floor exercise behind Matteo Giubellini, and the German team won the bronze medal in the mixed cup. He finished fourth in the all-around at the 2024 German Championships. He finished fifth in the all-around at the Olympic Trials. He was then selected to represent Germany at the 2024 Summer Olympics alongside Lukas Dauser, Nils Dunkel, Timo Eder, and Andreas Toba. The team finished 11th in the qualification round and did not advance to the final.

== Competitive history ==
| Year | Event | Team | AA | FX | PH | SR | VT | PB | HB |
Junior
| 2019 | European Youth Olympic Festival | 8 | 14 | | | | | 5 | |
| 2021 | German Championships | | 3rd place, bronze medalist(s) | | | | | | |
Senior
| 2022 | German Championships | | 14 | | 1st place, gold medalist(s) | | | | |
| 2022 | World Championships | R1 | | | | | | | |
| 2023 | DTB Pokal Mixed Cup | 2nd place, silver medalist(s) | | | | | | | |
| 2023 | European Championships | 5 | 8 | | | | | R2 | |
| 2023 | German Championships | | 1st place, gold medalist(s) | | | | | | |
| 2023 | World Championships | 6 | | | | | | | |
| 2024 | DTB Pokal Team Challenge | 3rd place, bronze medalist(s) | | 2nd place, silver medalist(s) | | | | | |
| 2024 | German Championships | | 4 | | | | | | |
| 2024 | German Olympic Trials | | 5 | | | | | | |
| 2024 | Olympic Games | 11 | | | | | | | |
