= Fabian Hambüchen =

German gymnast (born 1987)

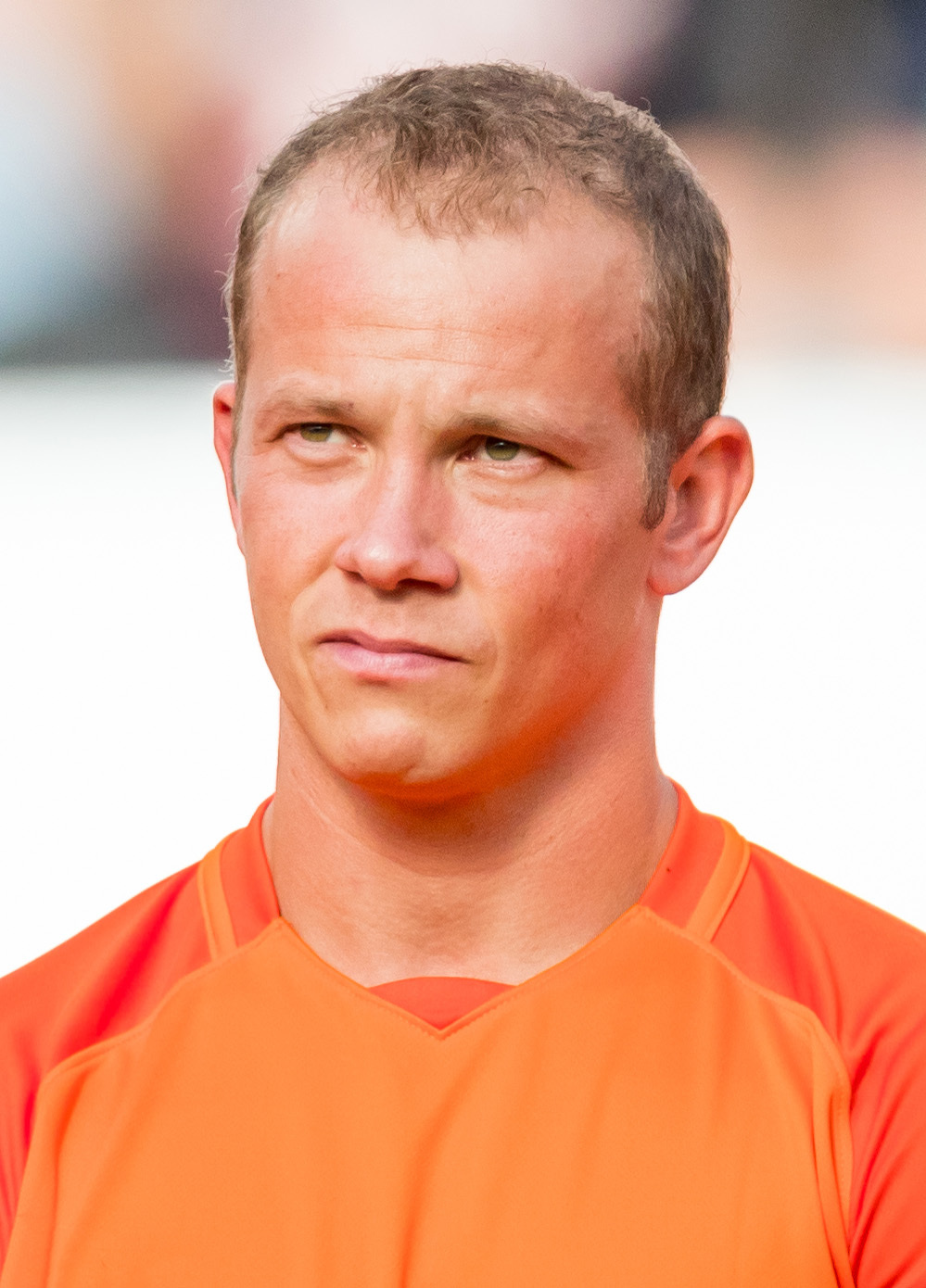
- Hambüchen in 2019

Personal information
- Born: 25 October 1987 (age 39) Bergisch Gladbach, West Germany
- Height: 1.64 m (5 ft 5 in)

Gymnastics career
- Discipline: Men's artistic gymnastics
- Country represented: Germany
- Club: TSG Niedergirmes; KTV Straubenhardt
- Head coach: Wolfgang Hambüchen
Medal record
Men's artistic gymnastics
Representing Germany
Event	1st	2nd	3rd
Olympic Games	1	1	1
World Championships	1	2	6
European Championships	6	2	3
European Games	1	1	0
Summer Universiade	1	2	0
Total	10	8	10
Olympic Games
Gold medal – first place	2016 Rio de Janeiro	Horizontal bar
Silver medal – second place	2012 London	Horizontal bar
Bronze medal – third place	2008 Beijing	Horizontal bar
World Championships
Gold medal – first place	2007 Stuttgart	Horizontal bar
Silver medal – second place	2007 Stuttgart	All-around
Silver medal – second place	2013 Antwerp	Horizontal bar
Bronze medal – third place	2006 Aarhus	All-around
Bronze medal – third place	2006 Aarhus	Vault
Bronze medal – third place	2007 Stuttgart	Team
Bronze medal – third place	2010 Rotterdam	Team
Bronze medal – third place	2010 Rotterdam	Horizontal bar
Bronze medal – third place	2013 Antwerp	All-around
European Games
Gold medal – first place	2015 Baku	Horizontal bar
Silver medal – second place	2015 Baku	Floor exercise
European Championships
Gold medal – first place	2005 Debrecen	Horizontal bar
Gold medal – first place	2007 Amsterdam	Horizontal bar
Gold medal – first place	2008 Lausanne	Horizontal bar
Gold medal – first place	2009 Milan	All-around
Gold medal – first place	2009 Milan	Floor exercise
Gold medal – first place	2010 Birmingham	Team
Silver medal – second place	2007 Amsterdam	All-around
Silver medal – second place	2008 Lausanne	Team
Bronze medal – third place	2008 Lausanne	Floor exercise
Bronze medal – third place	2009 Milan	Parallel bars
Bronze medal – third place	2010 Birmingham	Horizontal bar
Summer Universiade
Gold medal – first place	2015 Gwangji	Horizontal bar
Silver medal – second place	2013 Kazan	All-around
Silver medal – second place	2013 Kazan	Floor exercise

Fabian Hambüchen (also spelled Hambuechen; German pronunciation: [ˈfaːbi̯aːn ˈhamˌbyːçn̩]; born 25 October 1987) is a retired German gymnast who was an Olympic champion on horizontal bar in Rio 2016, World champion in Stuttgart 2007 on the same apparatus, as well as six times European champion on various other occasions and on different apparatus, including high bar, his most successful discipline. Apart from that, Fabian also won gold medals at European Games and at 2015 Summer Universiade. He has a full set of Olympic medals, one in each color, as he is the 2016 Olympic champion, 2012 Olympic silver medalist and 2008 Olympic bronze medalist in the individual horizontal bar event. Since the end of his active career, he has appeared in various television productions and advertising partnerships.

== Early life and education ==
Hambüchen was born on 25 October 1987 as the second child of Beate Hambüchen and the gymnastics coach Wolfgang Hambüchen in Bergisch Gladbach in West Germany. His ancestors were the painters Georg and Wilhelm Hambüchen, while his cousin is the famous German publicist and lawyer Ulrich Hambüchen. Shortly after his birth, his family moved to Wetzlar. Fabian attended the Goetheschule Wetzlar until his abitur in 2007. Alongside his education he was coached by his father. In October 2012, he began studying sports management and communication at the German Sport University Cologne. After completing his basic studies, Hambüchen decided in 2015 to change his course of study to sport and performance, graduating in 2020.

== Gymnastics career ==
Hambüchen's first major senior competition was the 2003 World Artistic Gymnastics Championships in Anaheim. He competed in 4 events in qualifications, but the German team did not advance to the team final.

Hambüchen was the youngest German athlete at the 2004 Summer Olympics in Athens, where the German team placed 8th in the team event final. Individually, Hambüchen finished 23rd in the all-around and 7th in the horizontal bar individual event finals.

In 2005, Hambüchen won the horizontal bar title at the 2005 European Artistic Gymnastics Championships. At the 2005 World Artistic Gymnastics Championships, Hambüchen competed in 3 events in qualifications and placed 4th in the horizontal bar individual event finals.

=== 2006 ===
Hambüchen competed at the 2006 European Artistic Gymnastics Championships where the German team placed 7th. Individually, at the 2005 European Artistic Gymnastics Championships placed 5th in the vault and 7th in the parallel bars individual event finals.

At the 2006 World Artistic Gymnastics Championships, Hambüchen won his first World Championship medal at the age of 18 with bronze in the all-around individual event final. He also won a bronze on vault despite having the lowest combined difficulty in the individual event final. The German team placed 7th in the team event final, with Hambüchen contributing scores on 5 events. However, Hambüchen did not qualify for the horizontal bar individual event final.

=== 2007 ===
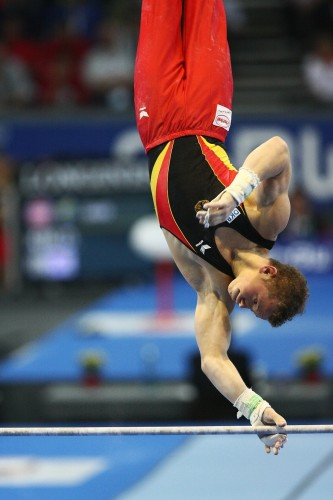
Hambüchen at the 2007 World Artistic Gymnastics Championships

In 2007, Hambüchen competed at the 2007 European Artistic Gymnastics Championships, where he won the silver medal in the all-around and won the horizontal bar individual event title, the latter for the second time.

The 2007 World Artistic Gymnastics Championships was held in Stuttgart, and the German team won the bronze medal in front of the home crowd, with Hambüchen contributing to 4 events. Individually, Hambüchen won the silver medal in the all-around individual event behind reigning world champion Yang Wei. He then won the gold medal in the horizontal bar individual event final, becoming world champion in that event. In the vault individual event final, he placed 5th.

In 2007, he was named the German Sportspersonality of the Year.

=== 2008 ===
At the 2008 European Artistic Gymnastics Championships, the German team won the silver medal, with Hambüchen contributing to 5 events. He qualified for 4 individual event finals, winning the bronze medal on floor, placing 5th on both vault and parallel bars, and defending his European title on the horizontal bar, making it his second consecutive European title on that event and third overall.

Going into the 2008 Summer Olympics in Beijing, Hambüchen was considered the favourite for the horizontal bar title and a strong contender for an all-around medal. He qualified for 4 individual event finals, including second in the all-around, and was the top qualifier for the horizontal bar. The German team placed 4th in the team event final, with Hambüchen contributing scores on 5 events. However, in the all-around individual event final, Hambüchen fell on the horizontal bar and placed 7th. He then placed 4th in the floor and parallel bars individual event finals. He then won his first Olympic Medal with a bronze in the horizontal bar individual event final.

=== 2009 ===
At the 2009 European Artistic Gymnastics Championships, Hambüchen won the individual all-around title and the floor title. He also placed 7th in the vault and won the bronze medal in the parallel bars individual event finals. He did not qualify for the high bar individual event final. Hambüchen had to pull out of the 2009 World Artistic Gymnastics Championships due to an injury to his foot. He was considered a frontrunner for the all-around and horizontal bar titles.

=== 2010 ===
At the 2010 European Artistic Gymnastics Championships, Hambüchen contributed scores on 5 events towards the German team winning the European title. Individually, he placed 8th in the rings individual event final, and tied for the bronze medal with his teammate Philipp Boy in the horizontal bar individual event final. At the 2010 World Artistic Gymnastics Championships, Hambüchen did not compete in the all-around due to an injured Achilles tendon, but he contributed scores on 3 events to the German team's bronze medal. He also qualified for the parallel bars individual event final, placing 4th, and the horizontal bar individual event final, where he won the bronze medal.

=== 2011 ===
In January 2011, Hambüchen tore his Achilles tendon, which kept him out of competition at the 2011 European Artistic Gymnastics Championships in Berlin. He recovered in time for the 2011 World Artistic Gymnastics Championships, where he once again contributed scores on 5 events in the team event final, and Germany finished 5th. He competed all 6 events in qualifications but did not advance to the all-around individual event final due to the rule that only 2 gymnasts from each country can advance to an individual event final, as Philipp Boy and Marcel Nguyen both qualified ahead of Hambüchen. He qualified for the horizontal bar individual event final, where he placed 4th.

=== 2012 ===
In 2012, Hambüchen once again missed the European Championships, as he wanted to focus on preparation for the Olympics. At the 2012 Summer Olympics in London, he qualified 3rd in the all-around and 4th in the horizontal bar individual event final. He contributed scores on 5 events to the German team's 7th-place finish. However, he had multiple large mistakes in the all-around individual event final, once again including a fall from the horizontal bar, finishing in 15th place. In the horizontal bar individual event final, he won his second Olympic medal, winning the silver behind Epke Zonderland of the Netherlands.

=== 2013 ===
At the 2013 European Artistic Gymnastics Championships, Hambüchen qualified for the horizontal bar individual event final but placed 6th after a fall. In July, he competed at the 2013 Summer Universiade, where the German team placed 4th. Hambüchen won the silver medal in the all-around behind Russian Nikolai Kuksenkov, beating 2013 European Champion David Belyavskiy. He also won silver in the floor individual event final behind Japan's Ryohei Kato. He competed at the 2013 World Artistic Gymnastics Championships, where he won the bronze medal in the all-around individual event final. He also finished in 7th place in the floor and won a silver medal in the horizontal bar individual event finals, once again in a close battle behind Zonderland.

=== 2014 ===
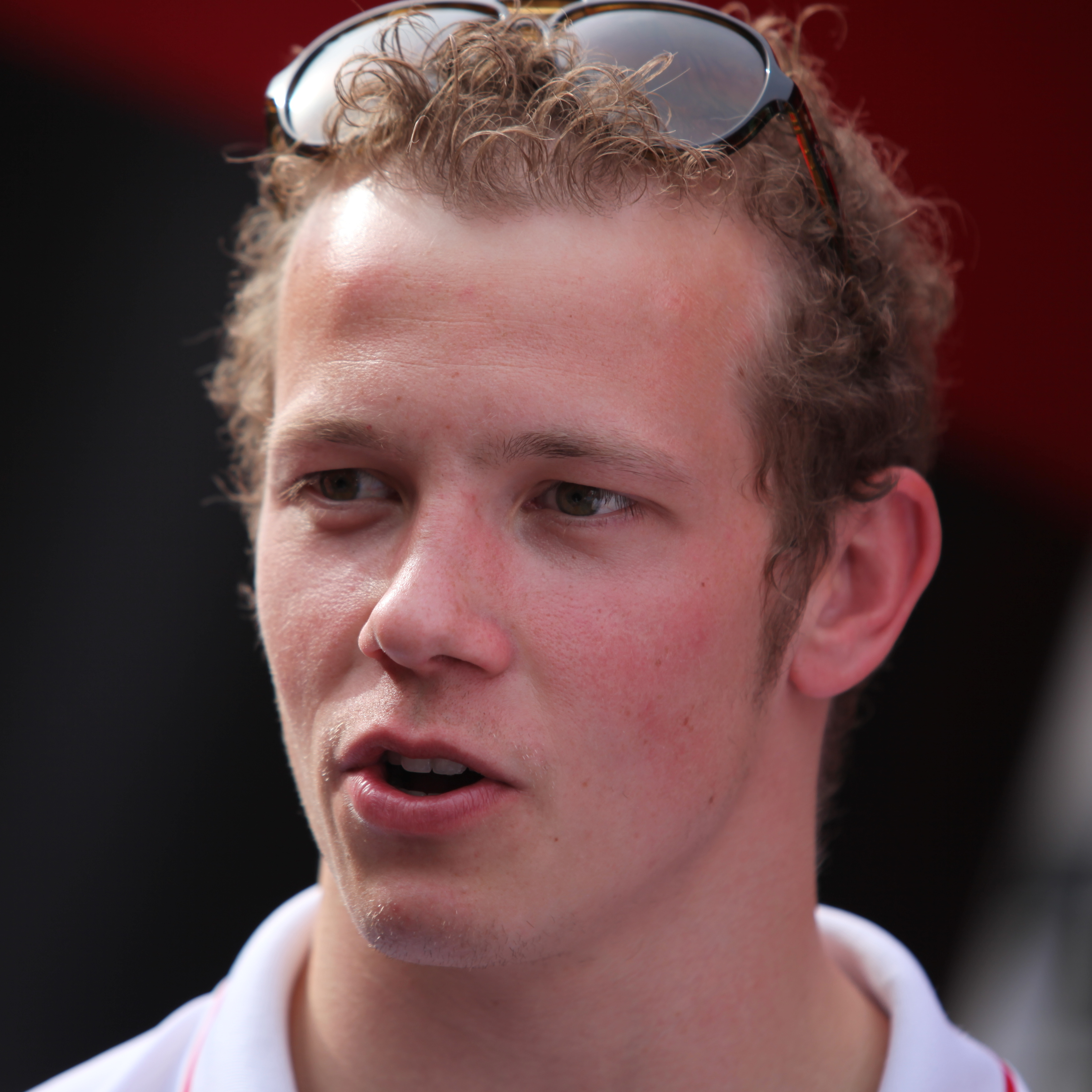
Hambüchen in 2014

At the 2014 European Artistic Gymnastics Championships the German team finished in 4th, with Hambüchen once again contributing scores on 5 events to the team total. He qualified in second to the horizontal bar individual event final, but had a bad fall during the final and did not finish his routine, ending up in 8th place. At the 2014 World Artistic Gymnastics Championships, the German team finished in 8th place. Hambüchen also finished in 8th place in the all-around individual event final but did not qualify for the horizontal bar individual event final after falling in qualifications.

=== 2015 ===
Hambüchen did not compete in the 2015 European Artistic Gymnastics Championships. In June, he competed at the 2015 European Games, where he finished 5th in the all-around and won the gold medal in the horizontal bar individual event finals. In July, he competed at the 2015 Summer Universiade, where he won the gold medal in the horizontal bar individual event final. At the 2015 World Artistic Gymnastics Championships, the German team did not qualify for the team final, and therefore missed automatic qualification for the 2016 Summer Olympics. Hambüchen qualified for the all-around individual event final in 27th place but withdrew due to illness. He also qualified for the horizontal bar individual event final in 4th place, but finished in 7th after executing a poor routine.

=== 2016 ===
Hambüchen was unable to compete for the first half of 2016 due to a shoulder injury. He was unable to compete in the Olympic test event where the German team secured their place for the 2016 Rio Olympics. Hambüchen returned to competition on three events (floor, vault, and the horizontal bar) at the German Olympic trials. At the 2016 Summer Olympics in Rio de Janeiro, the German team placed seventh in the team final, with Hambüchen contributing on 3 events. He qualified in 1st place for the horizontal bar individual event final, where he won his third Olympic medal and first Olympic gold, becoming the Olympic horizontal bar champion. With an Olympic gold medal in 2016, Hambüchen has completed the full collection set of horizontal bar medals in each colour at separate Olympics, improving his standings every subsequent four years from a bronze medal at the 2008 Beijing Olympics, then a silver medal at the 2012 London Olympics, and finally to the gold medal at the 2016 Rio Olympics.

Hambüchen retired after the 2016 Rio Olympics, stating that his Olympic title was "a dream come true". He was inducted into the International Gymnastics Hall of Fame in 2022.

== Post-gymnastics career ==
In 2010, Hambüchen published his autobiography Fabian Hambüchen – Die Autobiografie. Outside of his active career, Hambüchen has appeared in various game shows and as an expert in talk shows. Since the end of his active career, he has worked as a gymnastics expert for the ARD. He accompanied the coverage of the Pyeongchang 2018 and Beijing 2022 Winter Olympics as well as the Tokyo 2020 Olympics as an expert, reporter, and presenter for Eurosport. In addition, he actively tried out numerous Olympic sports himself, such as canoe slalom, in the TV series Hambüchen Challenge. He collaborates with the Hessian Ministry of Education and Cultural Affairs as an advocate for adult literacy education and is called the "Hessen's ambassador for literacy".

== Personal life ==
In July 2022, he married fitness trainer Viktoria Diesterbeck, whom he met in 2020. He currently lives in Wetzlar. Because of his short height, he has been nicknamed "Turnfloh" (meaning "gymnastics flea").

== Competitive History ==
Competitive history of Fabian Hambüchen
Year	Event	Team	AA	FX	PH	SR	VT	PB	HB
2003	German Championships			1st place, gold medalist(s)			1st place, gold medalist(s)	1st place, gold medalist(s)	
2003	World Championships			46				27	
2004	German Championships			1st place, gold medalist(s)					
2004	Junior European Championships	2nd place, silver medalist(s)	3rd place, bronze medalist(s)	1st place, gold medalist(s)			1st place, gold medalist(s)		1st place, gold medalist(s)
2004	Stuttgart World Cup			1st place, gold medalist(s)					1st place, gold medalist(s)
2004	Olympic Games	8	23						7
2005	German Championships		1st place, gold medalist(s)	1st place, gold medalist(s)				1st place, gold medalist(s)	1st place, gold medalist(s)
2005	European Championships								1st place, gold medalist(s)
2005	World Championships								4
2006	German Championships		1st place, gold medalist(s)	1st place, gold medalist(s)					1st place, gold medalist(s)
2006	Cottbus World Cup						2nd place, silver medalist(s)		2nd place, silver medalist(s)
2006	Stuttgart World Cup			1st place, gold medalist(s)					
2006	European Championships	7					5	7	
2006	World Championships	7	3rd place, bronze medalist(s)				3rd place, bronze medalist(s)		
2007	German Championships		1st place, gold medalist(s)	1st place, gold medalist(s)				1st place, gold medalist(s)	1st place, gold medalist(s)
2007	European Championships		2nd place, silver medalist(s)						1st place, gold medalist(s)
2007	World Championships	3rd place, bronze medalist(s)	2nd place, silver medalist(s)			5			1st place, gold medalist(s)
2008	German Championships		1st place, gold medalist(s)	1st place, gold medalist(s)			1st place, gold medalist(s)	1st place, gold medalist(s)	1st place, gold medalist(s)
2008	European Championships	2nd place, silver medalist(s)		3rd place, bronze medalist(s)		5	5		1st place, gold medalist(s)
2008	Olympic Games	4	7	4				4	3rd place, bronze medalist(s)
2009	German Championships		1st place, gold medalist(s)			1st place, gold medalist(s)	1st place, gold medalist(s)	1st place, gold medalist(s)	1st place, gold medalist(s)
2009	European Championships		1st place, gold medalist(s)	1st place, gold medalist(s)			7	3rd place, bronze medalist(s)	
2010	German Championships								1st place, gold medalist(s)
2010	European Championships	1st place, gold medalist(s)				8			3rd place, bronze medalist(s)
2010	World Championships	3rd place, bronze medalist(s)						4	3rd place, bronze medalist(s)
2011	German Championships								1st place, gold medalist(s)
2011	World Championships	5							4
2012	German Championships		1st place, gold medalist(s)	1st place, gold medalist(s)					1st place, gold medalist(s)
2012	Olympic Games	7	15						2nd place, silver medalist(s)
2013	Stuttgart World Cup		2nd place, silver medalist(s)						
2013	German Championships		1st place, gold medalist(s)						
2013	European Championships								6
2013	Summer Universiade	4	2nd place, silver medalist(s)	2nd place, silver medalist(s)					
2013	World Championships		3rd place, bronze medalist(s)	7					2nd place, silver medalist(s)
2014	American Cup		4						
2014	Tokyo World Cup		2nd place, silver medalist(s)						
2014	Stuttgart World Cup		4						
2014	German Championships		1st place, gold medalist(s)	1st place, gold medalist(s)			1st place, gold medalist(s)		1st place, gold medalist(s)
2014	European Championships	4							8
2014	World Championships	8							8
2015	German Championships		1st place, gold medalist(s)	1st place, gold medalist(s)					1st place, gold medalist(s)
2015	European Games		5	2nd place, silver medalist(s)					1st place, gold medalist(s)
2015	Summer Universiade	12		5					1st place, gold medalist(s)
2015	World Championships		WD						7
2016	German Championships			1st place, gold medalist(s)					1st place, gold medalist(s)
2016	Olympic Games	7							1st place, gold medalist(s)

== Works ==
=== Books ===
- 2010: Fabian Hambüchen – Die Autobiografie (ISBN 978-3-89602-948-5)

Awards
Preceded by Michael Greis; Jan Frodeno	German Sportsman of the Year; 2007; 2016	Succeeded by Matthias Steiner; Johannes Rydzek
