= Germany at the World Artistic Gymnastics Championships =

- Flag of Germany
- IOC code: GER
- Website: www.dtb.de
- Medals: Gold 7 Silver 14 Bronze 16 Total 37

Germany first competed at the 1934 World Championships. They did not compete at another World Championships until 1954, in which East Germany and West Germany competed as a joint team. Starting at the 1958 World Championships the two nations competed as separate teams. In 1991 Germany competed for the first time as a reunified team.

== Medalists ==
Medal	Name	Year	Event
Bronze	Franz Beckert, Konrad Frey, Kurt Krötzsch, Heinz Sandrock, Walter Steffens, Ernst Winter	(Hungary) 1934 Budapest	Men's team
Gold	Ernst Winter	(Hungary) 1934 Budapest	Men's horizontal bar
Silver	Heinz Sandrock	(Hungary) 1934 Budapest	Men's horizontal bar
Silver	Helmut Bantz	(Italy) 1954 Rome	Men's vault
Bronze	Helmut Bantz	(Italy) 1954 Rome	Men's parallel bars
Silver	Helmut Bantz	(Italy) 1954 Rome	Men's horizontal bar
Bronze	Sylvio Kroll, Andreas Wecker, Ralf Büchner, Mario Franke, Jan-Peter Nikiferow, Andre Hempel	(United States) 1991 Indianapolis	Men's team
Silver	Andreas Wecker	(United States) 1991 Indianapolis	Men's rings
Gold	Ralf Büchner	(United States) 1991 Indianapolis	Men's horizontal bar
Bronze	Maik Krahberg	(France) 1992 Paris	Men's floor exercise
Bronze	Andreas Wecker	(United Kingdom) 1993 Birmingham	Men's all-around
Silver	Andreas Wecker	(United Kingdom) 1993 Birmingham	Men's pommel horse
Silver	Andreas Wecker	(United Kingdom) 1993 Birmingham	Men's rings
Bronze	Valery Belenky	(Australia) 1994 Brisbane	Men's rings
Gold	Andreas Wecker	(Japan) 1995 Sabae	Men's horizontal bar
Gold	Valery Belenky	(Switzerland) 1997 Lausanne	Men's pommel horse
Bronze	Fabian Hambüchen	(Denmark) 2006 Aarhus	Men's all-around
Bronze	Oksana Chusovitina	(Denmark) 2006 Aarhus	Women's vault
Bronze	Fabian Hambüchen	(Denmark) 2006 Aarhus	Men's vault
Bronze	Fabian Hambüchen, Eugen Spiridonov, Robert Juckel, Marcel Nguyen, Thomas Angergassen, Philipp Boy	(Germany) 2007 Stuttgart	Men's team
Silver	Fabian Hambüchen	(Germany) 2007 Stuttgart	Men's all-around
Gold	Fabian Hambüchen	(Germany) 2007 Stuttgart	Men's horizontal bar
Bronze	Philipp Boy, Fabian Hambüchen, Thomas Taranu, Evgenij Spiridonov, Sebastian Krimmer, Matthias Fahrig	(Netherlands) 2010 Rotterdam	Men's team
Silver	Philipp Boy	(Netherlands) 2010 Rotterdam	Men's all-around
Bronze	Fabian Hambüchen	(Netherlands) 2010 Rotterdam	Men's horizontal bar
Silver	Philipp Boy	(Japan) 2011 Tokyo	Men's all-around
Silver	Oksana Chusovitina	(Japan) 2011 Tokyo	Women's vault
Bronze	Fabian Hambüchen	(Belgium) 2013 Antwerp	Men's all-around
Silver	Fabian Hambüchen	(Belgium) 2013 Antwerp	Men's horizontal bar
Bronze	Pauline Schäfer	(United Kingdom) 2015 Glasgow	Women's balance beam
Gold	Pauline Schäfer	(Canada) 2017 Montreal	Women's balance beam
Bronze	Tabea Alt	(Canada) 2017 Montreal	Women's balance beam
Bronze	Elisabeth Seitz	(Qatar) 2018 Doha	Women's uneven bars
Silver	Pauline Schäfer	(Japan) 2021 Kitakyushu	Women's balance beam
Silver	Lukas Dauser	(United Kingdom) 2022 Liverpool	Men's parallel bars
Gold	Lukas Dauser	(Belgium) 2023 Antwerp	Men's parallel bars
Silver	Helen Kevric	(Netherlands) 2026 Rotterdam	Women's uneven bars

== Medal tables ==
=== By gender ===
Gender	Gold	Silver	Bronze	Total
Men	6	11	12	29
Women	1	3	4	8

=== By event ===
Event	Gold	Silver	Bronze	Total
Men's horizontal bar	4	3	1	8
Women's balance beam	1	1	2	4
Men's parallel bars	1	1	1	3
Men's pommel horse	1	1	0	2
Men's individual all-around	0	3	3	6
Men's rings	0	2	1	3
Men's vault	0	1	1	2
Women's uneven bars	0	1	1	2
Women's vault	0	1	1	2
Men's team	0	0	4	4
Men's floor exercise	0	0	1	1
Women's floor exercise	0	0	0	0
Women's individual all-around	0	0	0	0
Women's team	0	0	0	0

== Junior World medalists ==
Medal	Name	Year	Event
Silver	Timo Eder	(Turkey) 2023 Antalya	Boys' floor exercise
Silver	Helen Kevric	(Turkey) 2023 Antalya	Girls' uneven bars

== See also ==
- Germany men's national artistic gymnastics team
- Germany women's national artistic gymnastics team
- List of Olympic male artistic gymnasts for Germany
- List of Olympic female artistic gymnasts for Germany
- East Germany at the World Artistic Gymnastics Championships
