= Sperling =

Sperling is a German and Jewish surname, meaning "sparrow" in English. Notable people with the surname include:

- Alexander Sperling (1890–1973), German gymnast
- Andrea Sperling, American film producer
- Bert Sperling (born 1950), American author
- Bodo Sperling (born 1952), German artist
- Daniel Sperling (born 1951), American professor
- Dee Dee Sperling, musical entertainer
- Eduard Sperling (1902–1985), German wrestler
- Edward Sperling (1889–1946), official in the British Mandate of Palestine, and Zionist
- Elliot Sperling (1951–2017), American associate professor
- Fritz Sperling (born 1945), Austrian bobsledder
- Gene Sperling (born 1958), American economist and attorney
- George Sperling (born 1934), American cognitive psychologist
- Gerhard Sperling (born 1937), East German race walker
- Gladys Athena Sperling (1904–2003), American scientist
- Godfrey Sperling (1915–2013), American journalist
- Hilde Krahwinkel Sperling (1908–1981), German tennis player
- Jack Sperling (1922–2004), American musician
- James Sperling, governor of the Bank of England
- Jody Sperling, American dancer
- Johann Sperling (1603–1658), German physician, zoologist, physicist, deacon, and rektor
- John Sperling (1921–2014), American billionaire and University of Phoenix founder
- Leon Sperling (1900–1941), Polish footballer
- Lilian Sperling, British nanny
- Marcos Von Sperling, Brazilian professor
- Martijn Sperling (1873–1946), Dutch captain and diver, who rescued 15 shipwrecked victims from the SS Berlin in 1907
- Matthew Sperling, British-American writer
- Matthew Sperling (Magic: The Gathering player), American Magic: The Gathering player
- Max Sperling (1905–1984), German officer
- Milton Sperling (1912–1988), producer and screenwriter
- Norman Sperling (born 1947), American telescope designer
- Peter Sperling (born 1960), founder of the Apollo Group
- Rolf Sperling (born 1940), German diver
- Rowland Sperling (1874–1965), British diplomat
- Sacha Sperling (born 1990), French novelist and screenwriter
- Swantje Sperling (born 1983), German politician
- Ted Sperling, musical director
- Vibeke Sperling, (1945–2017), Danish journalist
- Wolfram Sperling (born 1952), German swimmer

== Places ==
- Sperling, Manitoba, Canada

== See also ==
- Nicholas Sperlyng (fl. 1388–1402), English politician
- Sparling, surname
- Sperl, surname
- Spurling, surname
