= Robert Juckel =

German gymnast (born 1981)

- Born: 12 December 1981 (age 44) Cottbus, East Germany
- Height: 168 cm (5 ft 6 in)

Gymnastics career
- Discipline: Men's artistic gymnastics
- Country represented: Germany; (2004–2008)
- Club: SC Cottbus Turnen
Medal record
Men's artistic gymnastics
Representing Germany
World Championships
Bronze medal – third place	2007 Stuttgart	Team
European Championships
Silver medal – second place	2008 Lausanne	Team

Robert Juckel (born 12 December 1981) is a German former artistic gymnast. He participated in the 2004 Summer Olympics and the 2008 Summer Olympics. He won the bronze medal in the team event at the 2007 World Artistic Gymnastics Championships and a team silver medal at the 2008 European Championships.

== Gymnastics career ==
Juckel competed at his first World Championships in 2001. There, he placed 66th in the all-around qualifications and the German team finished 13th. He was selected to represent Germany at the 2004 Summer Olympics alongside Thomas Andergassen, Matthias Fahrig, Fabian Hambüchen, Sven Kwiatkowski, and Sergej Pfeifer. The team advanced to the team final and finished eighth, with Juckel competing on the pommel horse, still rings, and horizontal bar.

Juckel won a bronze medal on the horizontal bar at the 2005 São Paulo World Cup. Additionally, he placed sixth in the still rings final. He competed on the pommel horse, still rings, and horizontal bar at the 2005 World Championships but did not advance into any finals. He competed with the German team that placed seventh at the 2006 European Championships, where he also finished eighth in the pommel horse final. Juckel and the German team advanced into the team final at the 2006 World Championships, finishing seventh.

At the 2007 German Championships, he tied with Philipp Boy for second place in the all-around. He advanced into the all-around final at the 2007 European Championships and finished 14th. At the 2007 World Championships, he competed on the pommel horse, still rings, vault, and horizontal bar in the team final to help Germany win the bronze medal.

Juckel competed with the German team that won the silver medal at the 2008 European Championships. He was then selected to represent Germany at the 2008 Summer Olympics, where the team finished in fourth place. He decided to retire from the sport after these Olympic Games.
