= Spurling =

Spurling is a surname. Notable people with the surname include:

- James Spurling Albert or James S. Albert, professor of biology at the University of Louisiana at Lafayette
- Andrew Barclay Spurling (1833–1906), officer in the Union Army during the American Civil War
- Arthur Spurling (1896–1984), Bermudian who served during the First World War, becoming an ace credited with six aerial victories
- Bell & Spurling, English comedy music duo, consisting of Martin Bell and Johnny Spurling
- Bill Spurling (1907–1972), Australian rules footballer
- Bob Spurling (born 1943), former Australian rules footballer
- Chris Spurling (born 1977), former relief pitcher
- Claribel Spurling (1875–1941), English teacher, children’s writer, and cryptanalyst
- Frederick Spurling (1844–1914), British Anglican priest, university academic and theological writer
- Hilary Spurling, CBE, FRSL (born 1940), British writer, known for her work as a journalist and biographer
- Jack Spurling (1870–1933), English painter of sailing ships
- R. G. Spurling (1857–1935), founder of Church of God
- Roy Glenwood Spurling (1894–1968), American neurosurgeon remembered for describing Spurling's test
  - Spurling sign or Spurling's test, medical manoeuvre used to assess nerve root pain
- Scott Spurling (born 1993), English professional rugby union player

== See also ==
- Appleby Spurling Hunter, offshore legal service provider
- J Spurling Ltd v Bradshaw, an English contract law and English property law case on exclusion clauses and bailment
- Nicholas Sperlyng (fl. 1388–1402), English politician
- Sparling, surname
- Sperl, surname
- Sperling, surname
