= Raffaele Nardone =

Italian medical doctor, neurologist, and neuroscientist

Raffaele Nardone (born 15 January 1965) is an Italian medical doctor, neurologist, and neuroscientist, known for his contributions in the field of clinical neurophysiology. He is the chair of the Department of Neurology at the Franz Tappeiner Hospital in Merano, Italy.

== Early life ==
Raffaele Nardone was born on January 15, 1965, in Merano, South Tyrol, to Emilio Nardone, an inspector of police, and Maria Moretta, a tailor and housewife.

== Education ==
Nardone's medical career began at the Catholic University of Rome, where he studied from 1984 to 1991, later specializing in neurology in 1995. His doctoral thesis focused on a Preliminary clinical observation on a new trigeminal reflex: the trigemino-cervical reflex, earning him summa cum laude honors. He expanded his academic credentials with a PhD in Neuroscience in 2006, researching central cholinergic circuits in Alzheimer's disease.

== Research ==
Since 2008, Nardone has been a part of the Paracelsus Medical University in Salzburg, Austria, initially as an assistant professor and later as an Associate Professor of Neurology. He also serves as the chair of the Department of Neurology at the Franz Tappeiner Hospital in Merano, Italy. His academic contributions include over 300 peer-reviewed scientific papers, with a focus on clinical neurophysiology. His research encompasses areas like spinal cord disorders, dementia, and sleep medicine, with notable work in transcranial magnetic stimulation.

== Selected publications ==
- Nardone, R, Langthaler P.B., Schwenker, K.., Kunz. A.B., Sebastianelli L., Saltuari, L., Trinka, E., Versace, V. Visuomotor integration in early Alzheimer's disease: a TMS study. Journal of Neurological Sciences 2022;434:120129.
- Nardone, R. Langthaler, P.B., Höller, Y., Golaszewski, S. Versace, V., Sebastianelli, L., Brigo, F., Saltuari, L. Trinka, E. Role of human prefrontal cortex in the modulation of conditioned eyeblink responses. Behavioral Brain Research, 2019;374:112027.
- Nardone, R. Langthaler, P.B., Höller, Y. Bathke, A. Frey, V.N., Brigo, F. Trinka, E.. Modulation of non-painful phantom sensation in subjects with spinal cord injury by means of rTMS. Brain Research Bullettin, 2015;118:82-86.
- Nardone, R. Pikija, S., Mutzenbach, JS, Seidl, M., Leis, S., Trinka, E., Sellner, J. Current and emerging treatment options for spinal cord ischemia. Drugs Discovery Today, 2016;21(10):1632-1641.
- Nardone, R., Höller, Y., Brigo, F., Seidl, M., Christova, M., Bergmann, J., Golaszewski, S., Trinka., E. Functional brain reorganization after spinal cord injury: systematic review of animal and human studies. Brain Research, 2013;1504:58-73. PMID 23396112.
- Benussi, A., Grassi, M., Palluzzi, F., Koch, G., Di Lazzaro, V., Nardone, R., Cantoni, V., Dell; Era, V., Premi, E., Martorana, A., Di Lorenzo, F., Bonnì, S., Ranieri, F., Capone, F., Musumeci, G., Cotelli, M.S., Padovani, A., Borroni, B. Classification accuracy of TMS for the diagnosis of neurodegenerative dementias. Annals of Neurology, 2020;87(3):394-404.
