= Adolf Seebaß =

German gymnast

- Full name: Karl Adolf Joachim Justus Seebaß
- Born: 22 February 1890 Gandersheim, German Empire
- Died: 16 July 1964 (aged 74) Göttingen, West Germany

Gymnastics career
- Discipline: Men's artistic gymnastics
- Country represented: Germany
- Gym: Allgemeiner Akademischer Turnerbund Leipzig

Karl Adolf Joachim Justus Seebaß (22 February 1890 – 16 July 1964) was a German artistic gymnast. He competed at the 1912 Summer Olympics.
