= Uwe Billerbeck =

German gymnast

- Born: 28 May 1970 (age 56) Esslingen am Neckar, West Germany
- Height: 1.68 m (5 ft 6 in)

Gymnastics career
- Discipline: Men's artistic gymnastics
- Country represented: Germany
- Gym: Turnverein Neulingen

Uwe Billerbeck (born 28 May 1970) is a German former gymnast. He competed in six events at the 1996 Summer Olympics.
