= Karsten Oelsch =

German gymnast

- Born: 13 April 1971 (age 55) Erlabrunn, West Germany
- Height: 1.73 m (5 ft 8 in)

Gymnastics career
- Discipline: Men's artistic gymnastics
- Country represented: Germany
- Club: Sportclub Cottbus

Karsten Oelsch (born 13 April 1971) is a German former gymnast. He competed in eight events at the 1996 Summer Olympics.
