= Arno Glockauer =

German gymnast

- Full name: Franz Theodor Arno Glockauer
- Born: 31 July 1888 Reudnitz, Leipzig, German Empire
- Died: 11 January 1966 (aged 77) Bremen, West Germany

Gymnastics career
- Discipline: Men's artistic gymnastics
- Country represented: Germany
- Gym: Allgemeiner Akademischer Turnerbund Leipzig

Franz Theodor Arno Glockauer (31 July 1888 – 11 January 1966) was a German artistic gymnast. He competed at the 1912 Summer Olympics.
