= Jakob Kiefer =

German gymnast

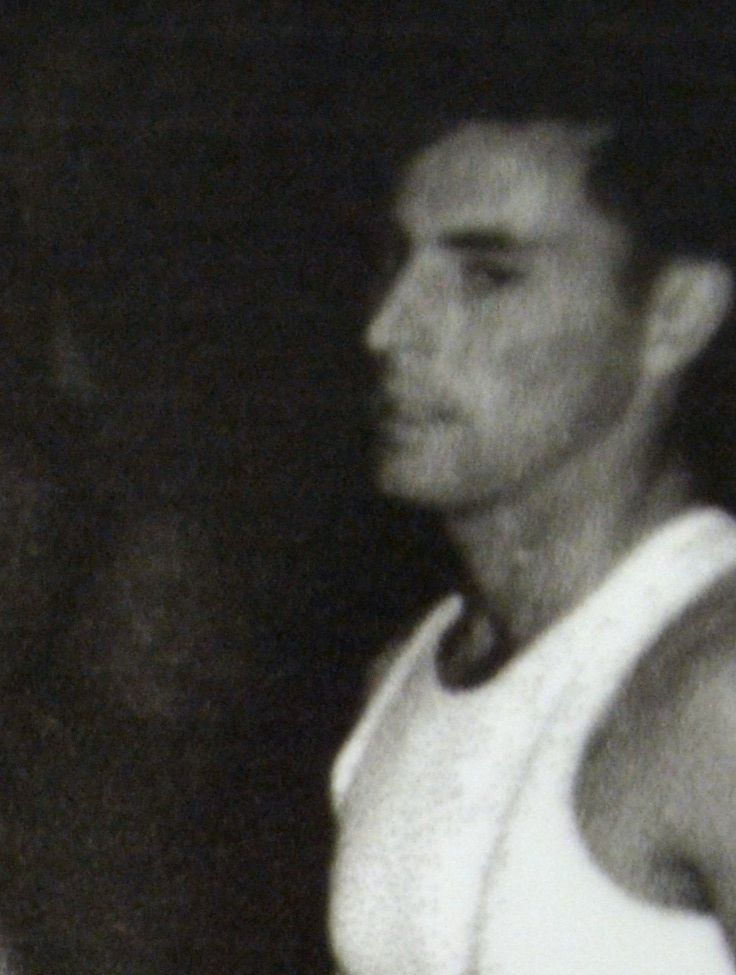
- Kiefer in 1951

Personal information
- Born: 3 December 1919 Bad Kreuznach, Weimar Republic
- Died: 18 January 1991 (aged 71) Bad Kreuznach, Germany

Gymnastics career
- Discipline: Men's artistic gymnastics
- Country represented: West Germany
- Gym: Verein für Leibesübungen 1848 Bad Kreuznach

Jakob Kiefer (3 December 1919 – 18 January 1991) was a German gymnast. He competed at the 1952 and 1956 Summer Olympics in all artistic gymnastics events and finished in fourth and fifth place with the German team, respectively. Individually, his best achievement was seventh place on the vault in 1956.

During his career, he won 12 national titles on the parallel bars (1950, 1954), pommel horse (1950, 1951 and 1954), rings (1950), vault (1950, 1954), horizontal bar (1950), floor (1950) and all-around (1950, 1951).
