= Germany men's national artistic gymnastics team =

National sports team

Germany men's national gymnastics team
- Continental union: European Union of Gymnastics
- National federation: Deutscher Turner-Bund

Olympic Games
- Appearances: 14
- Medals: Gold: 1936; Bronze: 1964

World Championships
- Appearances: 12
- Medals: Bronze: 1934, 1991, 2007, 2010

Junior World Championships
- Appearances: 3

The Germany men's national artistic gymnastics team represents Germany in FIG international competitions.

== History ==
At the Olympic Games Germany has made fourteen appearances in the men's team competition, three of which were technically under the United Team of Germany.

== Current senior roster ==
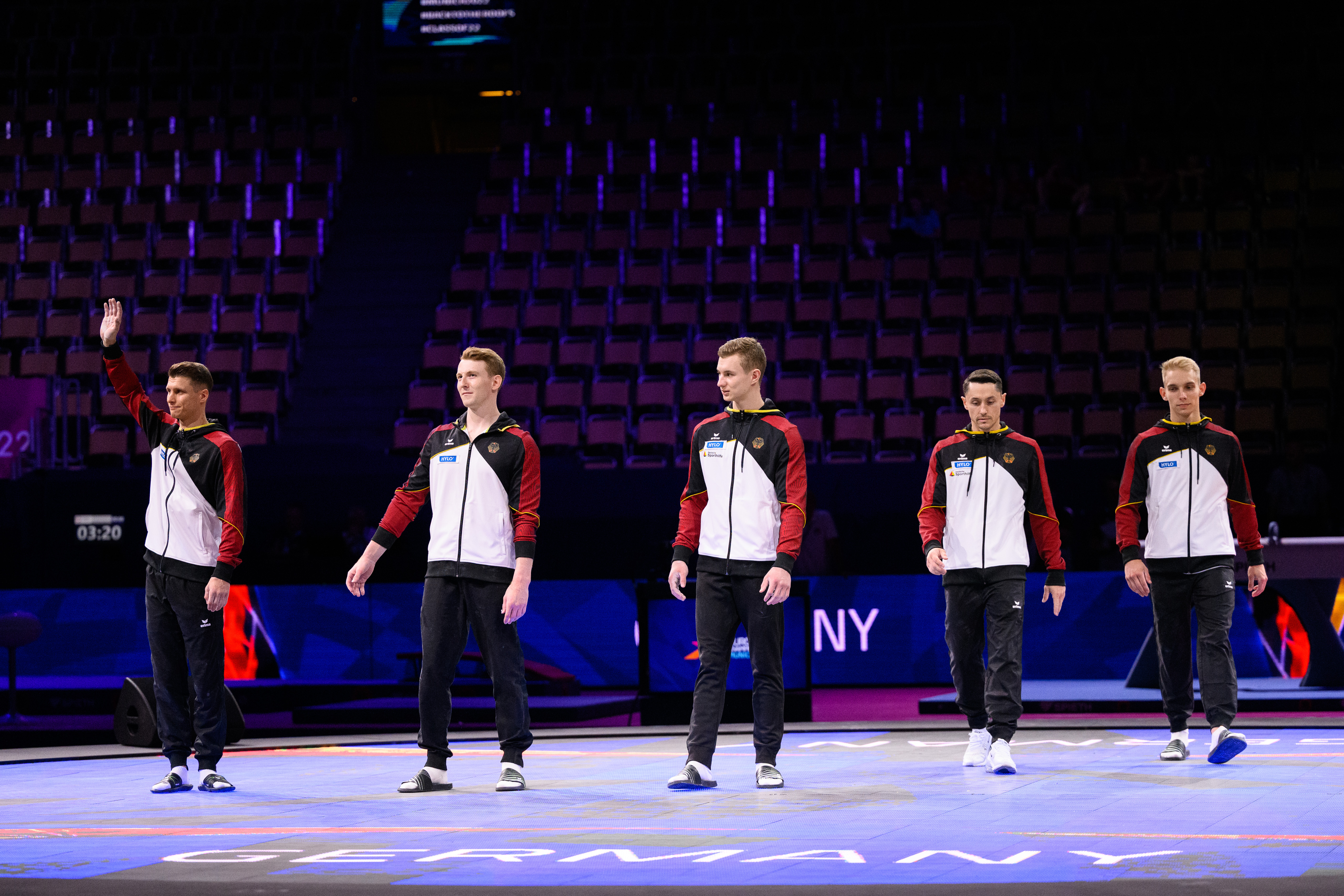
German team at the 2022 European Championships

Name	Birthdate and age	Hometown
Pascal Brendel	15 September 2003 (age 23)	Wehrheim
Anton Bulka	5 January 2006 (age 20)	Halle
Nils Dunkel	20 February 1997 (age 29)	Halle
Jonas Eder	15 December 2006 (age 19)	Ludwigsburg
Timo Eder	11 June 2004 (age 22)	Ludwigsburg
Gabriel Eichhorn	24 September 2005 (age 21)	Niederkirchen
Milan Hosseini	18 July 2001 (age 25)	Berlin
Elias Jaffer	27 March 2007 (age 19)	Weimar
Lucas Kochan	12 July 2000 (age 26)	Cottbus
Alexander Kunz	11 February 2003 (age 23)	Neu-Ulm
Daniel Mousichidis	25 June 2005 (age 21)	Schwalbach
Mert Öztürk	19 March 2006 (age 20)	Berlin
Dario Sissakis	26 June 1998 (age 28)	Berlin
Radomyr Stelmakh	15 August 2005 (age 21)	Zaporizhzhia, Ukraine
Mika Wagner	6 March 2007 (age 19)	Talheim

== Team competition results ==
=== Olympic Games ===
Before WWII
Year	Position	Squad
1912	5th place	Wilhelm Brülle, Johannes Buder, Walter Engelmann, Arno Glockauer, Walter Jesinghaus, Karl Jordan, Rudolf Körner, Heinrich Pahner, Kurt Reichenbach, Johannes Reuschle, Carl Richter, Hans Roth, Adolf Seebaß, Eberhard Sorge, Alexander Sperling, Alfred Staats, Hans Werner, Martin Worm
1920	—N/a	did not participate
1924	—N/a	did not participate
1928	—N/a	did not participate
1932	—N/a	did not participate
1936	gold medal	Alfred Schwarzmann, Konrad Frey, Matthias Volz, Willi Stadel, Franz Beckert, Walter Steffens, Innozenz Stangl, Ernst Winter

After WWII
Year	Position	Squad
1948	—N/a	banned from participating
1952	4th place	Helmut Bantz, Adalbert Dickhut, Jakob Kiefer, Friedel Overwien, Hans Pfann, Alfred Schwarzmann, Erich Wied, Theo Wied
1956	5th place	Helmut Bantz, Jakob Kiefer, Robert Klein, Hans Pfann, Erich Wied, Theo Wied competed as United Team of Germany
1960	7th place	Karlheinz Friedrich, Siegfried Fülle, Philipp Fürst, Erwin Koppe, Günter Lyhs, Günter Nachtigall competed as United Team of Germany
1964	bronze medal	Siegfried Fülle, Philipp Fürst, Erwin Koppe, Klaus Köste, Günter Lyhs, Peter Weber competed as United Team of Germany
1968 through 1988 — participated as East Germany and West Germany

After reunification
Year	Position	Squad
1992	4th place	Ralf Büchner, Mario Franke, Sylvio Kroll, Sven Tippelt, Oliver Walther, Andreas Wecker
1996	7th place	Andreas Wecker, Valery Belenky, Jan-Peter Nikiferow, Oliver Walther, Karsten Oelsch, Uwe Billerbeck, Marius Toba
2000	10th place	Jan-Peter Nikiferow, Dimitrij Nonin, Sergej Pfeifer, Marius Toba, Rene Tschernitschek, Andreas Wecker
2004	8th place	Thomas Andergassen, Matthias Fahrig, Fabian Hambüchen, Robert Juckel, Sven Kwiatkowski, Sergei Pfeifer
2008	4th place	Thomas Andergassen, Philipp Boy, Fabian Hambüchen, Robert Juckel, Marcel Nguyen, Eugen Spiridonov
2012	7th place	Philipp Boy, Fabian Hambüchen, Sebastian Krimmer, Marcel Nguyen, Andreas Toba
2016	7th place	Andreas Bretschneider, Lukas Dauser, Fabian Hambüchen, Marcel Nguyen, Andreas Toba
2020	8th place	Lukas Dauser, Nils Dunkel, Philipp Herder, Andreas Toba
2024	11th place	Pascal Brendel, Lukas Dauser, Nils Dunkel, Timo Eder, Andreas Toba

=== World Championships ===
Year	Position	Squad
1934	bronze medal	
1954	4th place	
1962 through 1989 — participated as East Germany and West Germany
1991	bronze medal	Sylvio Kroll, Andreas Wecker, Ralf Büchner, Mario Franke, Jan-Peter Nikiferow, Andre Hempel
1994	5th place	Valeri Belenki, Uwe Billerbeck, Jan-Peter Nikiferow, Marius Toba, Oliver Walther, Andreas Wecker, Mario Franke
1997	6th place	Valeri Belenki, Uwe Billerbeck, Daniel Farago, Sergei Charkov, Dimitrij Nonin, Sergej Pfeifer
2006	7th place	Fabian Hambüchen, Thomas Andergassen, Robert Juckel, Philipp Boy, Marcel Nguyen, Eugen Spiridonov
2007	bronze medal	Fabian Hambüchen, Eugen Spiridonov, Robert Juckel, Marcel Nguyen, Thomas Angergassen, Philipp Boy
2010	bronze medal	Philipp Boy, Fabian Hambüchen, Thomas Taranu, Evgenij Spiridonov, Sebastian Krimmer, Matthias Fahrig
2011	6th place	Philipp Boy, Marcel Nguyen, Fabian Hambüchen, Sebastian Krimmer, Eugen Spiridonov, Thomas Taranu
2014	8th place	Andreas Bretschneider, Lukas Dauser, Fabian Hambüchen, Helge Liebrich, Andreas Toba, Daniel Weinert
2015	9th place	Andreas Bretschneider, Fabian Hambüchen, Philipp Herder, Sebastian Krimmer, Marcel Nguyen, Andreas Toba
2018	10th place	Lukas Dauser, Philipp Herder, Nick Klessing, Marcel Nguyen, Andreas Toba
2019	12th place	Lukas Dauser, Philipp Herder, Nick Klessing, Karim Rida, Andreas Toba
2022	9th place	Lukas Dauser, Nils Dunkel, Pascal Brendel, Andreas Toba, Glenn Trebing
2023	6th place	Pascal Brendel, Lukas Dauser, Nils Dunkel, Nick Klessing, Lucas Kochan, Andreas Toba
2026	15th place	Nils Dunkel, Timo Eder, Lucas Kochan, Radomyr Stelmakh, Glenn Trebing, Alexander Kunz

=== Junior World Championships ===
Year	Position	Squad
2019	8th place	Arne Nicolai Halbisch, Nils Matache, Valentin Zapf
2023	8th place	Timo Eder, Alexander Kirchner, Maxim Kovalenko
2025	18th place	Elias Jaffer, Nikita Prohorov, Philipp Steeb

== Most decorated gymnasts ==
This list includes all German male artistic gymnasts who have won at least two medals, at least one being individual, at the Olympic Games and the World Artistic Gymnastics Championships combined. Only included are medals won as a Unified or United Germany; not included are medals won as part of East Germany or West Germany.

Rank	Gymnast	Team	AA	FX	PH	SR	VT	PB	HB	Olympic Total	World Total	Total
1	Fabian Hambüchen	2007; 2010	2007; 2006; 2013				2006		2016; 2012; 2008; 2007; 2013; 2010	3	9	12
2	Andreas Wecker	1991	1993		1992; 1993	1992; 1991; 1993			1996; 1992; 1995	4	6	10
3	Hermann Weingartner	1896; 1896			1896	1896	1896		1896	6	0	6
4	Konrad Frey	1936	1936	1936	1936			1936	1936	6	0	6
4	Alfred Schwarzmann	1936	1936				1936	1936	1952; 1936	6	0	6
6	Alfred Flatow	1896; 1896						1896	1896	4	0	4
7	Philipp Boy	2007; 2010	2010; 2011							0	4	4
8	Lukas Dauser							2020; 2023; 2022		1	2	3
9	Matthias Volz	1936			1936	1936				3	0	3
10	Marcel Nguyen	2007	2012					2012		2	1	3
11	Ralf Büchner	1991							1991	0	2	2
11	Valery Belenky				1997			1993		0	2	2

== See also ==
- German Artistic Gymnastics Championships
- Germany women's national gymnastics team
- List of Olympic male artistic gymnasts for Germany
