= Willi Stadel =

German gymnast (1912–1999)

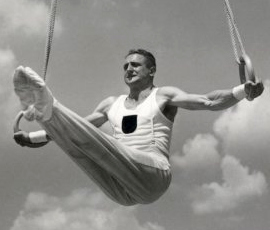
- Stadel at the 1936 Summer Olympics

Personal information
- Full name: Wilhelm Friedrich Stadel
- Born: 9 July 1912 Konstanz, German Empire
- Died: 23 March 1999 (aged 86) Ravensburg, Germany

Gymnastics career
- Discipline: Men's artistic gymnastics
- Country represented: Germany
- Gym: TV 1862 Konstanz
Medal record
Men's artistic gymnastics
Representing Germany
Olympic Games
Gold medal – first place	1936 Berlin	Team

Wilhelm Friedrich "Willi" Stadel (9 July 1912 – 23 March 1999) was a German gymnast who won a team gold medal at the 1936 Summer Olympics. His best individual result was sixth place on the floor.
