= Sperl =

Sperl is a surname. The Czech surname is Šperl with the female equivalent Šperlová. Notable people with the surname include:

- Andreas Sperl, German business executive
- Edna May Sperl (1899–1957), American silent film actress
- Johann Sperl (1840–1914), German painter
- Milan Šperl (born 1980), Czech cross-country skier
- Natalie Denise Sperl (born 1979), Austrian-American model and actress
- Sonja Sperl, German skier
- Timothy Sperl, birth name of Timothy Farrell (1922–1989), American actor
- Wolfgang Sperl, Austrian physician

== See also ==
- Café Sperl, Mariahilf, Vienna
- Sperling
