= Waiblingen (Landtag electoral district) =

State electoral district of Germany

15: Waiblingen
- Electoral district for the Landtag of Baden-Württemberg
- Waiblingen in 2026
- District: Rems-Murr
- Electorate: 106,277 (2026)
- Major settlements: Fellbach, Kork, Leutenbach, Schwaikheim, Waiblingen, and Winnenden

Current electoral district
- Party: CDU
- Member: Siegfried Lorek

Waiblingen is an electoral constituency (German: Wahlkreis) represented in the Landtag of Baden-Württemberg. Since 2026, it has elected one member via first-past-the-post voting. Voters cast a second vote under which additional seats are allocated proportionally state-wide. Under the constituency numbering system, it is designated as constituency 15. It is wholly within the district of Rems-Murr.

== Geography ==
The constituency includes the municipalities of Fellbach, Kork, Leutenbach, Schwaikheim, Waiblingen, and Winnenden, within the district of Rems-Murr.

There were 106,277 eligible voters in 2026.

== Members ==
=== First mandate ===
Both prior to and since the electoral reforms for the 2026 election, the winner of the plurality of the vote (first-past-the-post) in every constituency won the first mandate.

Election	Member	Party	%
1976	Alfred Entenmann	CDU	
1980	Alfred Entenmann	CDU	
1984	Rolf Kurz	CDU	
1988	Rolf Kurz	CDU	
1992	Rolf Kurz	CDU	
1996	Rolf Kurz	CDU	
2001	Rolf Kurz	CDU	
2006	Christoph Palm	CDU	42.2
2011	Matthias Pröfrock	CDU	36.8
2016	Wilhelm Halder	Grüne	27.8
2021	Swantje Sperling	Grüne	30.0
2026	Siegfried Lorek	CDU	35.0

=== Second mandate ===
Prior to the electoral reforms for the 2026 election, the seats in the state parliament were allocated proportionately amongst parties which received more than 5% of valid votes across the state. The seats that were won proportionally for parties that did not win as many first mandates as seats they were entitled to, were allocated to their candidates which received the highest proportion of the vote in their respective constituencies. This meant that following some elections, a constituency would have one or more members elected under a second mandate.

Prior to 2011, these second mandates were allocated to the party candidates who got the greatest number of votes, whilst from 2011-2021, these were allocated according to percentage share of the vote.

Election	Member	Party	Member	Party	Member	Party
1976	Heinz Bühringer	SPD				
1980	Rainer Brechtken	SPD	Kurt Vollmer	FDP		
1984	Rainer Brechtken	SPD	Kurt Vollmer	FDP		
1988	Rainer Brechtken	SPD	Kurt Vollmer	FDP		
1992	Rainer Brechtken	SPD	Friedrich-Wilhelm Kiel	FDP		
1996	Rainer Brechtken	SPD	Friedrich-Wilhelm Kiel	FDP		
2001	Katrin Altpeter	SPD				
2006	Katrin Altpeter	SPD	Ulrich Goll	FDP		
2011	Katrin Altpeter	SPD	Ulrich Goll	FDP	Wilhelm Halder	Grüne
2016	Siegfried Lorek	CDU	Ulrich Goll	FDP		
2021	Siegfried Lorek	CDU	Julia Goll	FDP		

== Election results ==
=== 2026 election ===
State election (2026): Waiblingen
Notes:	Blue background denotes the winner of the electorate vote. Pink background denotes a candidate elected from their party list. Yellow background denotes an electorate win by a list member, or other incumbent. A ✓ or ✗ denotes status of any incumbent, win or lose respectively.						
Party	Candidate	Votes	%	±%	Party votes	%	±%
CDU	Siegfried Lorek	25,775	35.0	▲9.8	22,341	30.2	▲5.1
Greens	✗ Swantje Sperling	20,722	28.1	▼1.8	24,026	32.5	▲2.6
AfD	Jürgen Braun	12,221	16.6	▲8.4	12,110	16.4	▲8.2
SPD	Bettina Süßmilch	5,857	7.9	▼2.9	4,038	5.5	▼5.4
FDP	Julia Goll	4,768	6.5	▼6.8	4,076	5.5	▼7.8
Left	Roman Bondarew	2,931	4.0	▲0.9	2,692	3.6	▲0.6
FW					1,259	1.7	▼3.0
BSW					866	1.2	
APT					622	0.8	
Volt	Marie Kühne	934	1.3		515	0.7	
PARTEI					272	0.4	▼1.0
dieBasis					271	0.4	▼0.5
Bündnis C					164	0.2	
Values					157	0.2	
ÖDP	Patrick Schmidt	511	0.7	▲0.1	137	0.2	▼0.4
Pensioners					132	0.2	
Team Todenhöfer					102	0.1	
PdF					41	0.1	
Verjüngungsforschung					32	0.0	
KlimalisteBW					31	0.0	▼0.7
Humanists					21	0.0	
Informal votes		563			377		
Total valid votes		73,719			73,905		
Turnout		74,282	69.9	▲4.7			
CDU gain from Greens	Majority	5,053	6.9				

=== 2021 election ===
State election (2026): Waiblingen
Party	Candidate	Votes	%	±%
Greens	Swantje Sperling	20,468	30.0	▲2.2
CDU	Siegfried Lorek	17,183	25.1	▼1.1
FDP	Julia Goll	9,070	13.3	▲1.9
SPD	Sibylle Mack	7,411	10.8	▼3.0
AfD	Marc Maier	5,563	8.1	▼6.6
FW	Peter Treiber	3,201	4.7	
Left	Sören Weber	2,101	3.1	▲0.4
PARTEI	Annemarie Arendt	921	1.3	
dieBasis	Peter Meincke	605	0.9	
KlimalisteBW	Michael Vonau	484	0.7	
Independent	Alfonso Fazio	477	0.7	
WiR2020	Stefan Schmidt	424	0.6	
ÖDP	Alexander Fox	423	0.6	
Majority		3,285	4.9	
Rejected ballots		389	0.6	▼0.1
Turnout		68,720	65.2	▼8.2
Registered electors		105,445		
Greens hold		Swing		

== See also ==
- Politics of Baden-Württemberg
- Landtag of Baden-Württemberg
