= Robert Klein (gymnast) =

German gymnast

- Born: 10 October 1925 Cologne, Weimar Republic
- Died: 13 October 2000 (aged 75) Bad Mergentheim, Germany

Gymnastics career
- Discipline: Men's artistic gymnastics
- Country represented: West Germany

Robert Klein (10 October 1925 – 13 October 2000) was a German gymnast. He competed at the 1956 Summer Olympics in all artistic gymnastics events and finished in fifth place with the German team. Individually, his best achievement was seventh place on the vault. He won two national titles on the rings, in 1955 and 1957.
