= Hans Pfann =

German gymnast (1920–2021)

- Born: 14 September 1920 Nuremberg, Weimar Republic
- Died: 9 September 2021 (aged 100) Neuötting, Germany
- Spouse: Lydia Zeitlhofer

Gymnastics career
- Discipline: Men's artistic gymnastics
- Country represented: West Germany
- Club: Turn- und Sportverein 1852 Neuötting

Hans Pfann (14 September 1920 – 9 September 2021) was a German gymnast. He competed at the 1952 and 1956 Summer Olympics in all artistic gymnastics events and finished in fourth and fifth place with the German team, respectively. Individually, his best achievement was 18th place on the rings in 1952.
