= Sergej Pfeifer =

German gymnast (born 1977)

- Born: 20 February 1977 (age 49) Dushanbe, Tajik SSR, Soviet Union
- Height: 1.69 m (5 ft 7 in)

Gymnastics career
- Discipline: Men's artistic gymnastics
- Country represented: Germany
- Club: Turn-Klubb zu Hannover 1858

Sergej Pfeifer (born 20 February 1977) is a German gymnast. He competed at the 2000 Summer Olympics and the 2004 Summer Olympics.
