= Alex Sperling =

German artistic gymnast (1890–1973)

- Full name: Alexander Sperling
- Born: 19 April 1890 Leipzig, German Empire
- Died: 20 February 1973 (aged 82) Cologne, West Germany

Gymnastics career
- Discipline: Men's artistic gymnastics
- Country represented: Germany
- Gym: Allgemeiner Akademischer Turnerbund Leipzig

Alexander Sperling (19 April 1890 – 20 February 1973) was a German artistic gymnast. He competed at the 1912 Summer Olympics.
