= Mario Franke =

German gymnast

- Born: 22 January 1968 (age 58) Sangerhausen, East Germany
- Height: 1.70 m (5 ft 7 in)

Gymnastics career
- Discipline: Men's artistic gymnastics
- Country represented: Germany
- Club: Sportverein Halle
Medal record
Men's artistic gymnastics
Representing Germany
World Championships
Bronze medal – third place	1991 Indianapolis	Team

Mario Franke (born 22 January 1968) is a German former gymnast. He competed in eight events at the 1992 Summer Olympics.
