= Evgenij Spiridonov =

German gymnast (born 1982)

- Born: 2 April 1982 (age 44) Chelyabinsk, Russian SFSR, Soviet Union

Gymnastics career
- Discipline: Men's artistic gymnastics
- Country represented: Germany
Medal record
Men's artistic gymnastics
Representing Germany
World Championships
Bronze medal – third place	2007 Stuttgart	Team
Bronze medal – third place	2010 Rotterdam	Team
European Championships
Gold medal – first place	2010 Birmingham	Team
Silver medal – second place	2006 Volos	Pommel horse

Evgenij Spiridonov or Eugen Spiridonov (born 2 April 1982) is a German male artistic gymnast and part of the national team. He participated in the 2008 Summer Olympics. He also competed at world championships including the 2011 World Artistic Gymnastics Championships in Tokyo, Japan.
