= Gladys Athena Sperling =

American bacteriologist

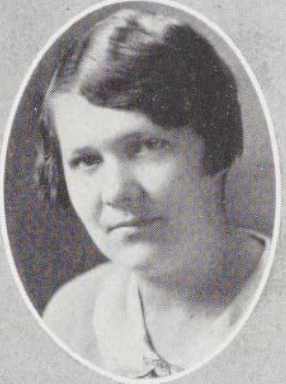
- Gladys Athena Sperling, from the 1928 yearbook of Oberlin College
- Born: July 25, 1904; Pulaski, New York, U.S.
- Died: January 17, 2003 (age 98); New York, U.S.
- Occupations: Bacteriologist, nutrition researcher

Gladys Athena Sperling (July 25, 1904 – January 17, 2003) was an American bacteriologist and nutrition researcher at Cornell University from the 1930s into the 1970s.

== Early life and education ==
Sperling was born in Pulaski, New York, the daughter of Andrew J. Sperling and Stella J. Pratt Sperling. She earned a bachelor's degree in chemistry from Oberlin College in 1928, and completed a master's degree in bacteriology at Cornell University in 1936, with a thesis titled "The Rate of Growth and Gas Production by Escherichia-aerobacter Organisms in Media of Different Compositions".

== Career ==
Sperling worked at Cornell with Clive McCay in nutrition research, from the 1930s into the 1960s. Much of their work involved experimental studies of nutritional interventions on the growth and aging of rats. She spoke to community groups about nutrition, and was active in the American Association of University Women. She retired from the Animal Sciences department at Cornell in 1970. In retirement, she participated in local theatre and other community programs in Ithaca.

== Publications ==
Sperling co-authored dozens of scientific papers published in academic journals, including The Journal of Nutrition, Archives of Biochemistry, Proceedings of the Society for Experimental Biology and Medicine, The Journal of Gerontology, and Gerontologia.

- "Chemical and Pathological Changes in Aging and after Retarded Growth: Four Figures" (1939, with C. M. McCay, G. H. Ellis, L. L. Barnes, and C. A. H. Smith)
- "The influence of age and rate of breeding upon the ability of the female rat to reproduce and raise young" (1941, with S. A. Asdell and R. Bogart)
- "Nutritional Requirements during the Latter Half of Life: One Figure" (1941, with Clive M. McCay, L. A. Maynard, and Harlow S. Osgood)
- "The physiology of lactation" (1942, with L. A. Maynard, Clive M. McCay, J. K. Loosli, F. Lingenfelter, and B. Barrentine)
- "Growth, ageing, chronic diseases, and life span in rats" (1943, with Clive M. McCay and L. L. Barnes)
- "Growth Retardation and Corneal Vascularization with Tyrosine and Phenylalanine in a Purified Diet" (1946, with C. F. Niven and Mary R. Washburn)
- "The Effect of Coffee, Human Diets, and Inheritance upon the Life Span of Rats" (1946, with J. K. Loosli, L. L. Barnes, and Clive M. McCay)
- "A Study of the Pathogenesis of Chronic Pulmonary Disease (Bronchiectasis) of Old Rats" (1946, with John A. Saxton Jr. and Leroy L. Barnes)
- "Bone Growth in Normal and Retarded Growth Rats" (1947, with Leroy L. Barnes and Clive M. McCay)
- "Age changes in relation to the ingestion of milk, water, coffee, and sugar solutions" (1952, with Clive M. McCay, F. Lovelace, L. L. Barnes, C. H. Liu, C. A. H. Smith, and J. A. Saxton, Jr.)
- "Effect of long time feeding of whole milk diets to white rats" (1955, with Floyd Lovelace, L. L. Barnes, C. A. H. Smith, J. A. Saxton Jr., and Clive M. McCay)
- "Parabiosis between Old and Young Rats" (1957, with Clive M. McCay, Frank Pope, Wanda Lunsford, and P. Sambhavaphol)
- "Teeth, bones, and aging of Syrian hamsters" (1958, with F. Lovelace L. Will, and Clive M. McCay)
- "Parabiosis as a Method for Studying Factors which Affect Aging in Rats" (1963, with W. R. Lunsford, C. M. McCay, P. J. Lupien, and F. E. Pope)
- "Effect of Sulfamerazine and Exercise on Life Span of Rats and Hamsters" (1978, with J. K. Loosli, P. Lupien, and Clive M. McCay)

== Personal life ==
Sperling died in 2003, at the age of 98. Her papers are in special collections at the Cornell University Library.
