= Wolfgang Sperl =

Austrian Pediatrist

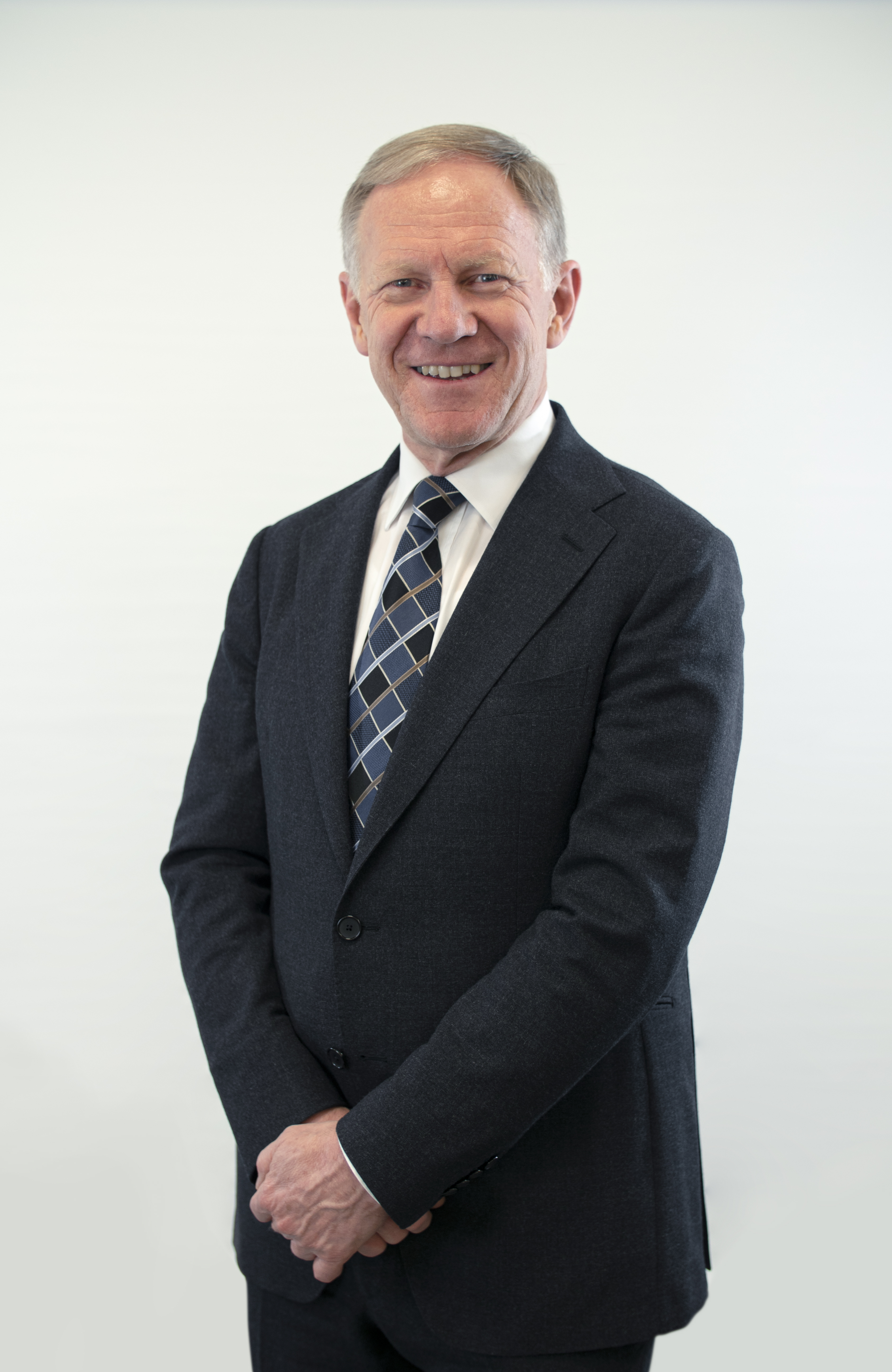
Image of Wolfgang Sperl

Wolfgang Sperl is an Austrian physician and has been rector of Paracelsus Medical University in Salzburg since June 1, 2020. Up until June 2021, he headed the Department of Pediatrics and Adolescent Medicine at University Hospital Salzburg and was also Head of the Center for Pediatric and Adolescent Medicine Salzburg.

== Life and career ==
After graduating from the Realgymnasium Linz (high school with a focus on natural science subjects) in Linz in 1974, Wolfgang Sperl studied medicine at the University in Innsbruck and earned his doctorate there in 1981 "sub auspiciis Praesidentis rei publicae". From 1981, he undertook medical specialist training in pediatrics at the University Hospital for Pediatrics and Adolescent Medicine Innsbruck, qualifying as medical specialist in 1987. After completing an Erwin Schrödinger scholarship between 1988 and 1990 at the Radboud University in Nijmegen, Netherlands, he completed his doctorate at the University Hospital of Pediatric and Adolescent Medicine in 1992 for his Ph.D. In the same year he habilitated at the University Hospital for Pediatrics and Adolescent Medicine in Innsbruck on the subject of “Mitochondrial encephalomyopathies in childhood”. In 1998, he was appointed “Ao. Univ.-Prof.” at the University of Innsbruck.

Since 1996, Sperl has been Head of the Department of Pediatrics and Adolescent Medicine at University Hospital Salzburg, and since 2007 Professor of Pediatrics at the University Hospital of Paracelsus Medical University in Salzburg. Since 2013 he has been coordinating the Center for Pediatric and Adolescent Medicine at University Hospital Salzburg.

At the same time, he has been working as medical director of REKIZ, the specialist hospital for children's neurorehabilitation, since 2010. Since 2010 he has been Head of the Department for Rehabilitation in Children and Adolescents of the Austrian Society of Pediatrics and Adolescent Medicine, of which he was president between 2015 and 2018. Since then he has been the Vice President of the Austrian Society of Pediatrics and Adolescent Medicine.

In 2015 Sperl took over the scientific direction of the "Early Life Care" university course at Paracelsus Medical University and St. Virgil Salzburg.

On June 1, 2020, he followed founding rector Herbert Resch as the new rector of Paracelsus Medical University (sites in Salzburg and Nuremberg).
