= Paracelsus Medical University =

Medical school in Austria

Coordinates: 47°48′33″N 13°01′59″E

- Paracelsus Medizinische Privatuniversität
- Motto: Creating the future of medical excellence
- Type: Private
- Established: 2002
- Rector: Wolfgang Sperl
- Students: 1600 (2020)
- Location: Strubergasse 21, Salzburg, Salzburg, Austria
- Campus: Second campus in Nuremberg, Bavaria, Germany
- Colors
- Website: www.pmu.ac.at

The Paracelsus Medical University (German: Paracelsus Medizinische Privatuniversität) is a private university located in Salzburg municipality, Austria and Nuremberg, Germany.

== Organization and financing ==
University management

- Wolfgang Sperl (Rector)
- Theodor Fischlein (Vice Rector)
- Lydia Gruber (Chancellor)
- Stephan Kolb (Vice Chencellor)

The university's legal entity is the Paracelsus Medical University Salzburg - private foundation. The committee reports to the Board of Trustees.

Board of Trustees

- Wolfgang Sperl (Chairperson)
- Volker Viechtbauer
- Lydia Gruber

Foundation board

- Christian Stöckl (Chairperson)
- Irene Oesch-Hayward
- Bernhard Fürthauer
- Heinrich Dieter Kiener
- Andrea Klambauer
- Gertraud Leimüller
- Jürgen Rauch
- Herbert Resch
- Gerlinde Rogatsch
- Felix Sedlmayer
- Peter Unterkofler

The financing of the Paracelsus Medical University is carried out for the most part through private funds. Furthermore, it includes public funding provided by local and regional government bodies (province and city of Salzburg, Salzburg Regional Authorities Association), tuition fees and cross financing from research contracts and through net income (e.g. further education courses, etc.). Being a private university, the Paracelsus Medical University is not entitled to funding from the federal government.

== Partnerships ==
Constructive and beneficial partnerships in medical and scientific fields have been established with the Mayo Clinic School of Medicine (USA), Yale University (USA), University of Milan (Italy), Cambridge University (UK), University of North Florida (USA), Johns Hopkins University, Dhulikhel Hospital in Nepal as well as national universities.

A further intensive and long-standing partnership connects the Paracelsus Medical University, the University Hospital Salzburg (Landeskrankenhaus Salzburg) and the Christian Doppler Clinic. As the university was established, the clinics' formerly autonomous departments were integrated to become university clinic departments. The transformation to university hospitals followed in 2007.

The university's second location in Nuremberg with the study of human medicine is based on the cooperation with Klinikum Nuremberg (Klinikum Nürnberg).

In addition, the Paracelsus Medical University is able to make use of a broad-based network of academic teaching hospitals and teaching practices, particularly within the regions of Salzburg and Bavaria.

== Studies and further education ==
Degree Courses:

- Study of Human Medicine (Bachelor & Master, academic title "Dr. med. univ.")
- Study of Pharmacy (Bachelor & Master)
- Nursing Science Online (Bachelor of Science in Nursing)
- Pflege impact (Bachelor of Science in Nursing)
- Master's Degree Program in Nursing Science (Master of Science in Nursing)
- Public Health (Master of Science in Public Health)
- Advanced Nursing Practice ("Advanced Nurse Practitioner in acute care" / "Advanced Nurse Practitioner in chronic care")
- Medical Science Doctorate Study Program (Ph.D.)
- Nursing and Allied Health Sciences (Ph.D.)
- Nursing Practice & Leadership (Ph.D.)
- In addition the Paracelsus University offers a variety of postgraduate programs and degree courses.

== Scientific research institutes & research centers ==
- General Practice, Family Medicine and Preventive Medicine
- Anatomy and Cell Biology
- Nursing Science and Practice
- Pharmacology und Toxicology
- Pharmacy
- Physiology und Pathophysiology
- Hereditary Metabolic Diseases
- Biomechanics
- Early Life Care
- Ecomedicine
- Experimental Neuroregeneration
- Experimental and Clinical Cell Therapy
- Gastein Research Institute
- Molecular Regenerative Medicine
- Molecular Sports and Rehabilitation Medicine
- Neurointervention
- Tendon and Bone Regeneration
- Synergetic and Psychotherapy Research
- Advanced Radiation Technologies - radART
- Rehabilitation, Transition and Palliation of Neurologically Ill Children
- Spine Research

Centers:

- Clinical Research Centre Salzburg (CRCS)
- Spinal Cord Injury and Tissue Regeneration Center Salzburg (SCI-TReCS)
- Public Health and Healthcare Research

The main research focuses at the Paracelsus Medical University belong to the area of regenerative medicine:

- Neurosciences
- Oncological, immunological and allergic diseases
- Musculoskeletal diseases, biomechanics and sports medicine
- Metabolic diseases

Research Programs:

- Experimental ophthalmology and glaucoma research
- Molecular therapy of genetic dermatoses
- Nano vesicular therapies
- Proteomics
- Psychotherapy evaluation in a complex therapy setting

== See also ==
- List of medical schools
