= Swantje Sperling =

German politician (born 1983)

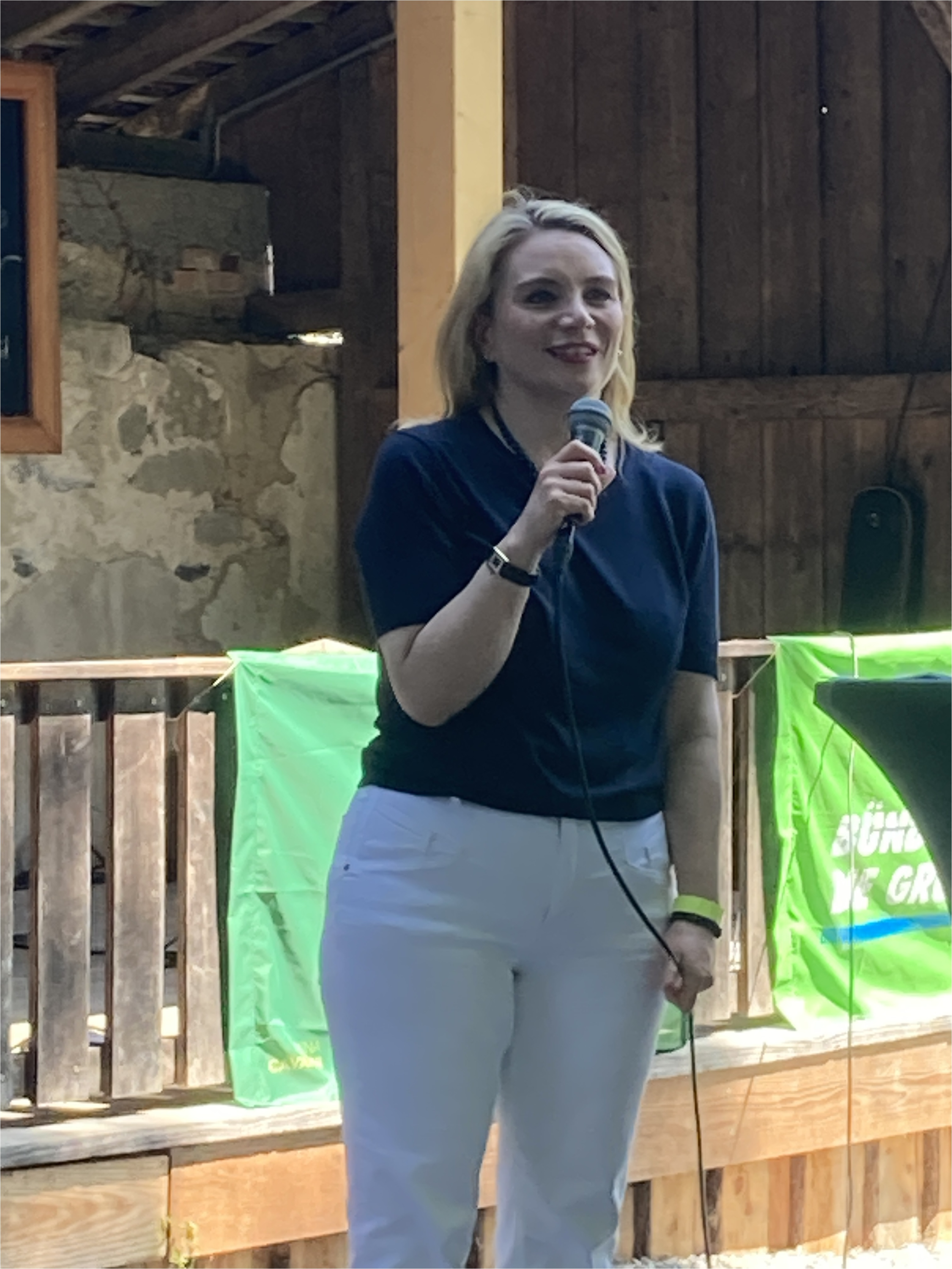
- Sperling in 2026

Member of the Landtag of Baden-Württemberg
- Incumbent
- Assumed office 18 May 2021
- Preceded by: Willi Halder
- Constituency: Waiblingen (2021–2026)

Personal details
- Born: 6 June 1983 (age 43)
- Party: Alliance 90/The Greens (since 2002)

Swantje Sperling (born 6 June 1983) is a German politician serving as a member of the Landtag of Baden-Württemberg since 2021. From 2011 to 2020, she was a district councillor of Ludwigsburg. From 2009 to 2020, she was a city councillor of Remseck.
