= Sebastian Krimmer =

German gymnast (born 1990)

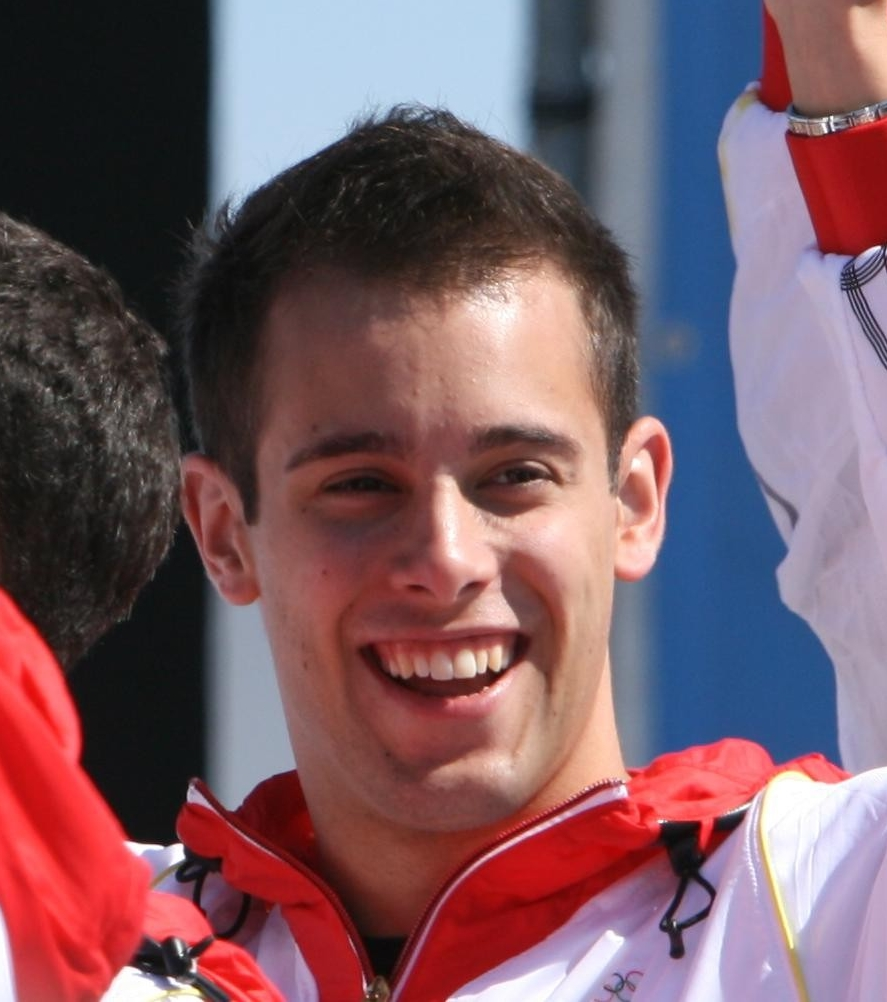

Personal information
- Born: 21 June 1990 (age 36) Backnang, West Germany
- Height: 174 cm (5 ft 9 in)

Gymnastics career
- Discipline: Men's artistic gymnastics
- Country represented: Germany
- Club: MTV Stuttgart
- Head coach: Valeri Belenki
Medal record
World Championships
Bronze medal – third place	2010 Rotterdam	Team

Sebastian Krimmer (born 21 June 1990 in Backnang) is a German gymnast. He competed for the national team at the 2012 Summer Olympics in the Men's artistic team all-around.
