= Timo Eder =

German gymnast

- Eder at the 2026 Swiss Cup

Personal information
- Born: 11 June 2005 (age 21) Ludwigsburg, Germany

Gymnastics career
- Discipline: Men's artistic gymnastics
- Country represented: Germany; (2022–present)
- Club: MTV Ludwigsburg
- Head coach: Jörg Schwaiger
Medal record
Men's artistic gymnastics
Representing Germany
European Championships
Gold medal – first place	2025 Leipzig	Mixed team
Bronze medal – third place	2025 Leipzig	Parallel bars
Junior World Championships
Silver medal – second place	2023 Antalya	Floor exercise
FIG World Cup
Event / 1st / 2nd / 3rd; World Challenge Cup / 0 / 3 / 0

Timo Eder (born 11 June 2005) is a German artistic gymnast. He is the 2023 Junior World silver medalist on floor exercise. He represented Germany at the 2024 Summer Olympics.

== Early life ==
Eder was born in 2005. He has a younger brother, Jonas Eder, who is also a gymnast.

== Gymnastics career ==
=== As a junior ===
In early 2022, Eder competed at the DTB Pokal Team Challenge where he helped Germany win the silver medal as a team. Later that summer, he competed at the European Championships where he helped Germany place fifth as a team.

In March of the following year, Eder competed at the DTB Pokal Team Challenge, where he helped Germany finish second as a team; individually, he also won silvers on floor exercise and horizontal bar. Later that month, he competed at the second Junior World Championships alongside Alexander Kirchner and Maxim Kovalenko. On the first day of competition, he helped Germany place eighth as a team. During the all-around final, Eder placed fifth. During the event finals, he won silver on floor exercise behind Ángel Barajas of Colombia.

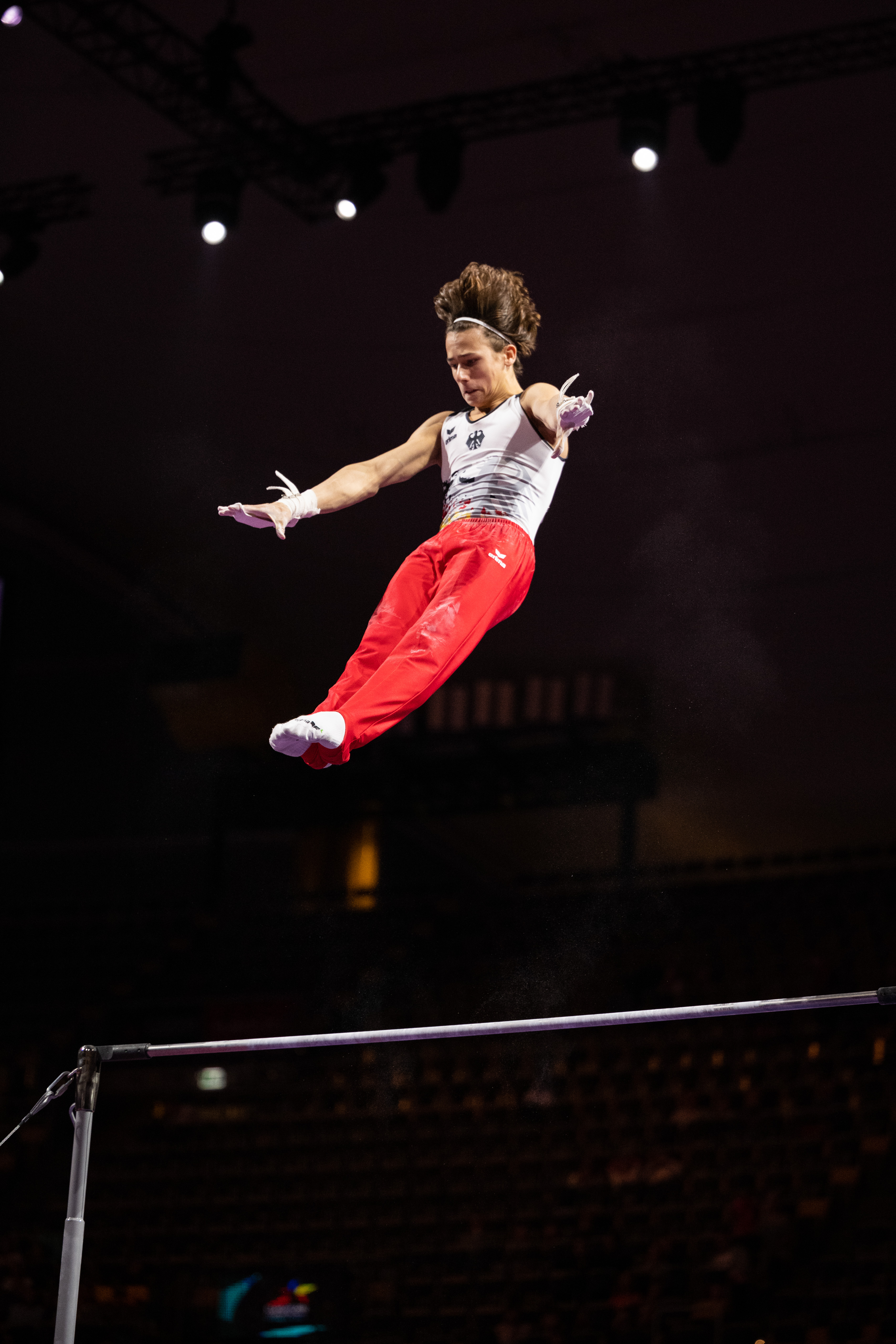
Horizontal bar

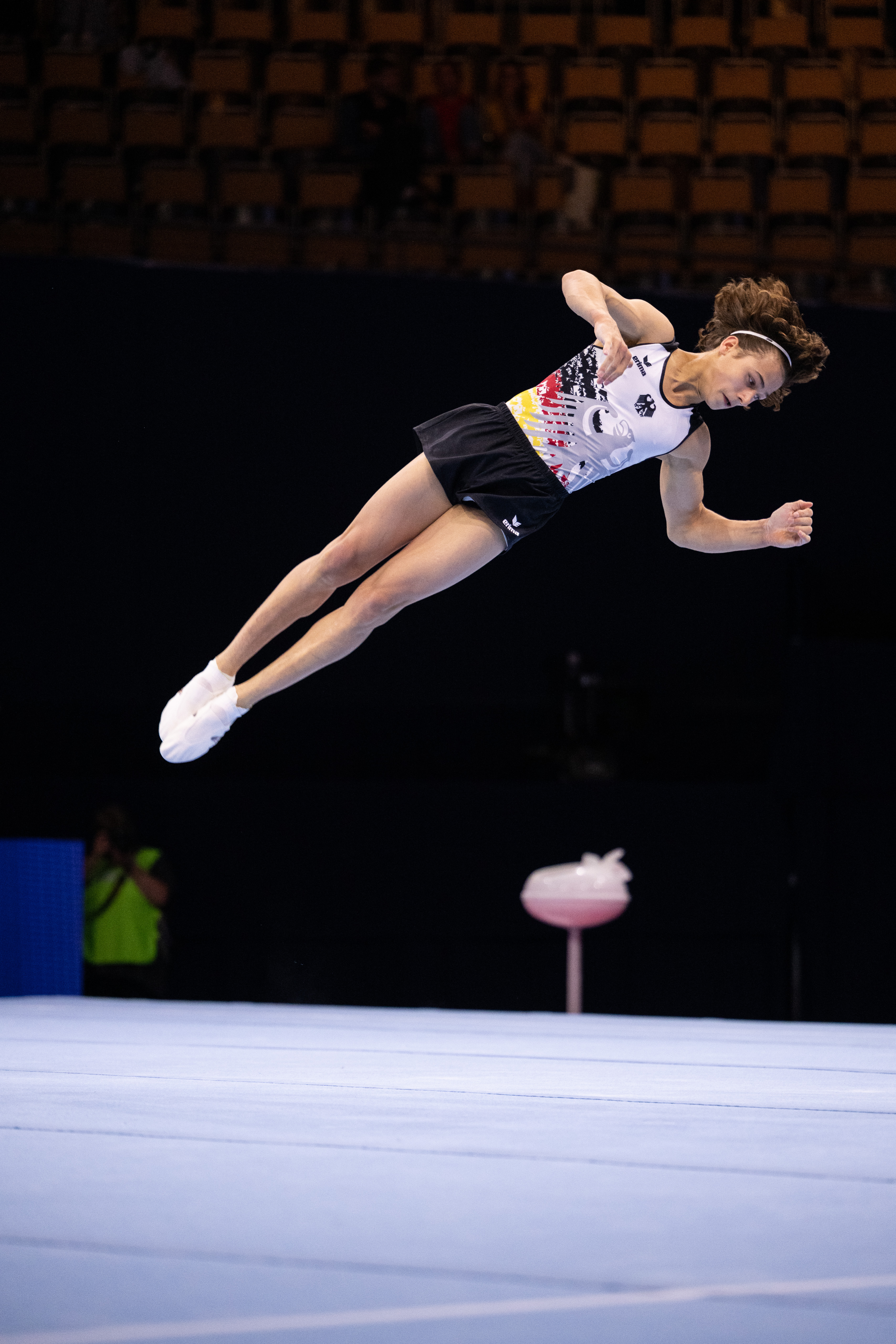
Floor exercise

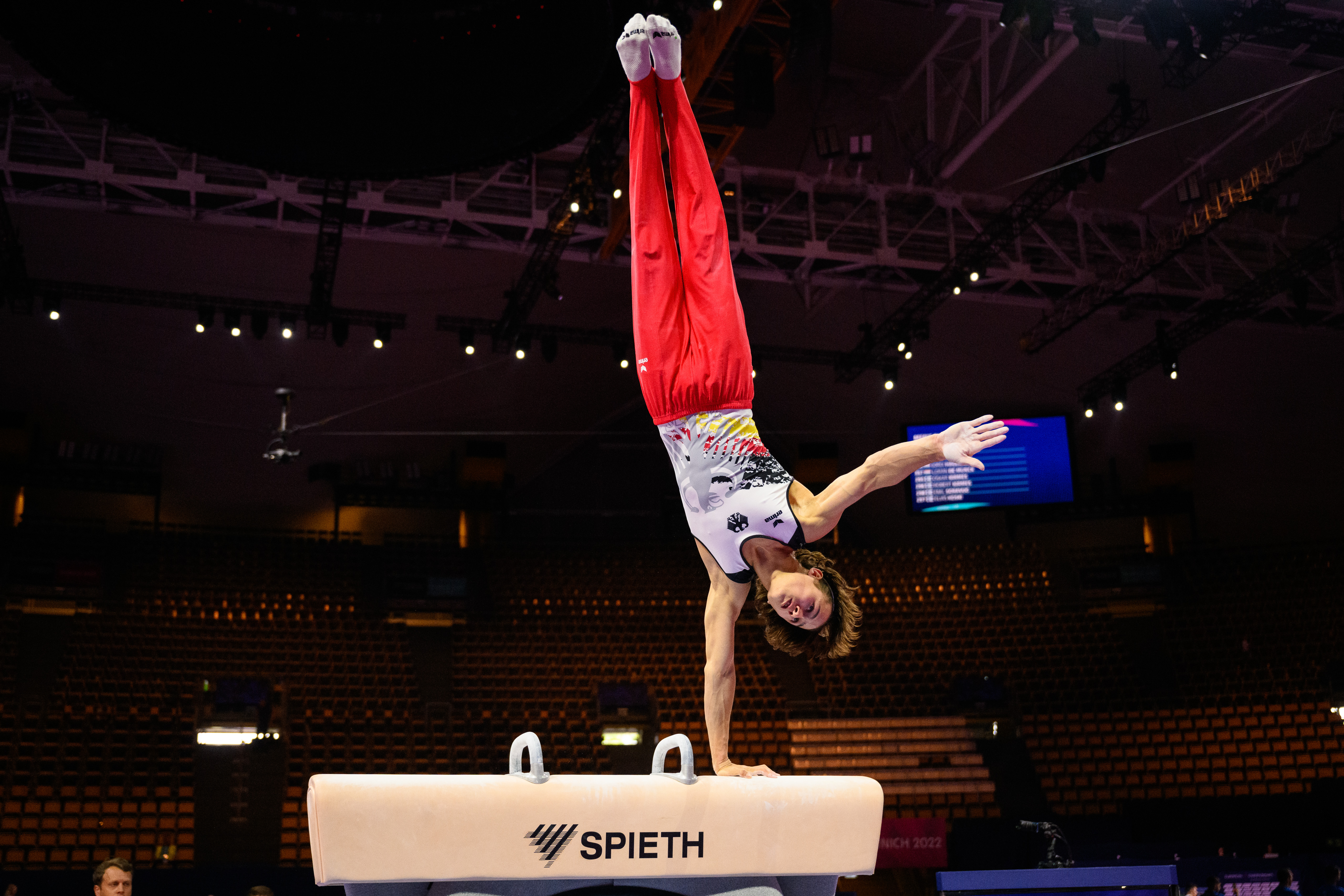
Pommel horse

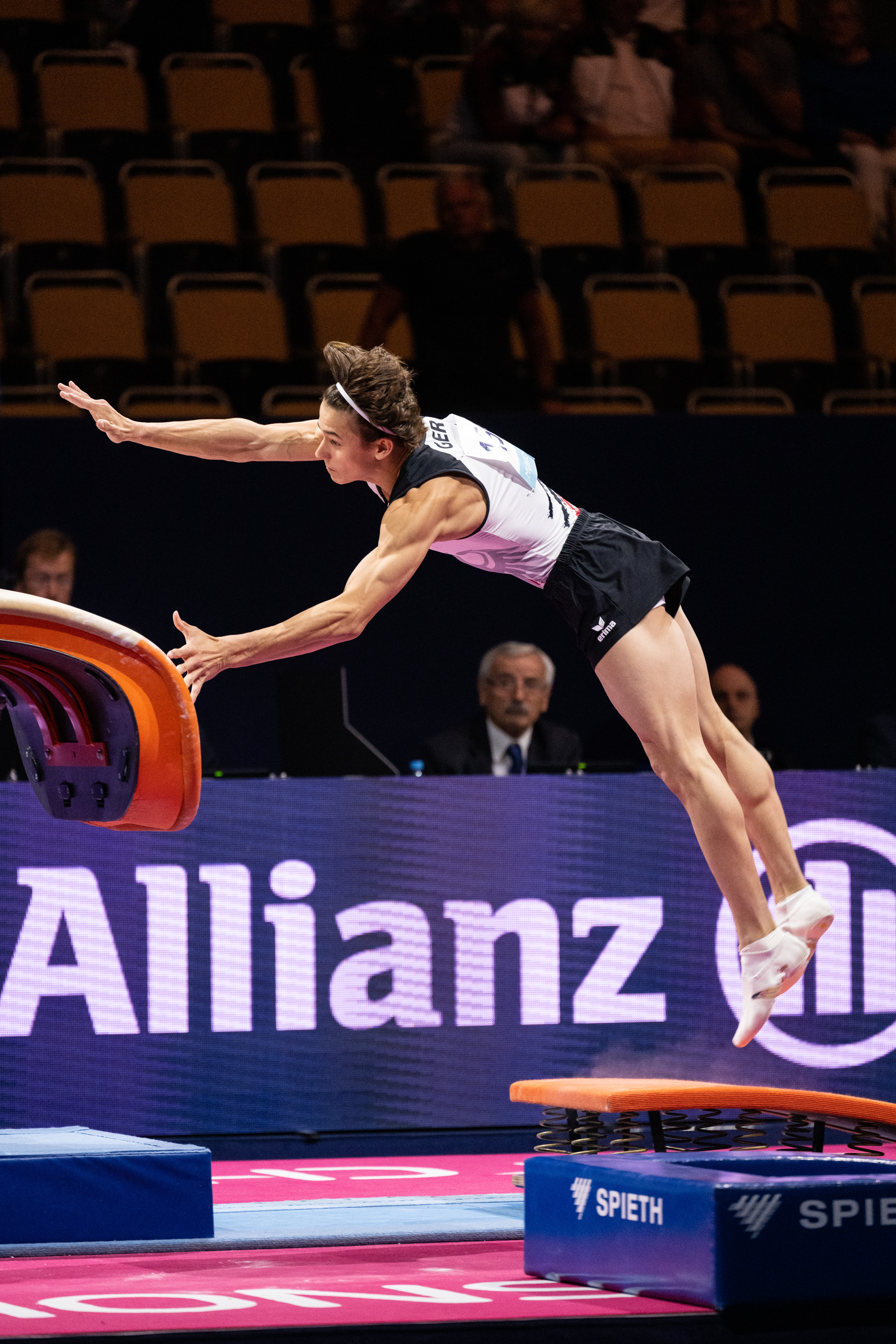
Vault

Eder at the 2022 European Championships

=== 2024 ===
At the German Championships, Eder placed third in the all-around behind Lukas Dauser and Andreas Toba. At the Olympic trial, Eder placed first in the all-around. As a result, he was selected to compete at the 2024 Olympic Games alongside Dauser, Toba, Nils Dunkel, and Pascal Brendel. At the Olympic Games Germany finished eleventh as a team during qualifications.

=== 2025 ===
Eder competed at the DTB Pokal Team Challenge where he helped Germany place sixth; individually, he placed fifth on floor exercise. Additionally, he competed in the Mixed Cup portion of the competition as well, where he helped Germany place second. At the Varna World Challenge Cup he placed seventh on floor exercise.

In late May, Eder competed at the 2025 European Championships where he helped the German team finish fourth. He qualified for the all-around and parallel bars finals as well as the inaugural mixed team event alongside Karina Schönmaier. During the mixed team final he and Schönmaier finished first, besting the British pair of Jake Jarman and Ruby Evans. During the all-around final Eder finished thirteenth and during event finals he won bronze on parallel bars behind compatriot Nils Dunkel and Ian Raubal of Switzerland.

At the 2025 World Championships, Eder placed nineteenth in the all-around.

=== 2026 ===
Eder at the 2026 Swiss Cup

Eder competed at the World Challenge Cups in Varna and Koper; he won silver on horizontal bar at each and additionally won silver on floor exercise in Koper. At the 2026 European Championships, he helped Germany place fifth as a team; individually he placed eleventh in the all-around. At the 2026 World Championships, he placed fifteenth in the all-around. At the Arthur Gander Memorial, he won bronze behind Matteo Giubellini and Yul Moldauer. He next competed at the 2026 Swiss Cup alongside Milan Hosseini, Karina Schönmaier, and Charleen Pach; together they won silver behind team France.

== Competitive history ==
Competitive history of Timo Eder
Year	Event	Team	AA	FX	PH	SR	VT	PB	HB
2022	DTB Pokal Team Challenge	2nd place, silver medalist(s)							
2022	Junior European Championships	5							
2023	DTB Pokal Team Challenge	2nd place, silver medalist(s)		2nd place, silver medalist(s)					2nd place, silver medalist(s)
2023	Junior World Championships	8	5	2nd place, silver medalist(s)					
2023	German Championships		17	3rd place, bronze medalist(s)	4				
2024	DTB Pokal Team Challenge	5							
2024	DTB Pokal Mixed Cup	3rd place, bronze medalist(s)							
2024	Antalya World Challenge Cup						6		
2024	German Championships		3rd place, bronze medalist(s)	4	2nd place, silver medalist(s)			6	6
2024	German Olympic Trials		1st place, gold medalist(s)						
2024	Olympic Games	11							
2024	Arthur Gander Memorial		8						
2025	DTB Pokal Team Challenge	6		5					
2025	DTB Pokal Mixed Cup	2nd place, silver medalist(s)							
2025	Varna World Challenge Cup			7					
2025	European Championships	4	13					3rd place, bronze medalist(s)	
2025	European Championships Mixed Team	1st place, gold medalist(s)	—N/a						
2025	German Championships		1st place, gold medalist(s)	1st place, gold medalist(s)	2nd place, silver medalist(s)			6	
2025	World Championships	—N/a	19						
2026	DTB Pokal Team Challenge	5	5	1st place, gold medalist(s)					
2026	DTB Pokal Mixed Cup	1st place, gold medalist(s)							
2026	Varna World Challenge Cup			7				6	2nd place, silver medalist(s)
2026	Koper World Challenge Cup			2nd place, silver medalist(s)					2nd place, silver medalist(s)
2026	German Championships		5	4					
2026	European Championships	5	11						
2026	World Championships	15	14						
2026	Arthur Gander Memorial		3rd place, bronze medalist(s)						
2026	Swiss Cup	2nd place, silver medalist(s)							
