= Franz Beckert =

German gymnast (1907–1973)

- Full name: Franz Ernst Beckert
- Born: 13 March 1907 Neustadt, Titisee-Neustadt, German Empire
- Died: 7 September 1973 (aged 66) Titisee-Neustadt, West Germany

Gymnastics career
- Discipline: Men's artistic gymnastics
- Country represented: Germany
- Gym: Turnverein Neustadt 1847
Medal record
Men's artistic gymnastics
Representing Germany
Olympic Games
Gold medal – first place	1936 Berlin	Team

Franz Ernst Beckert (13 March 1907 – 7 September 1973) was a German gymnast who competed in the 1936 Summer Olympics.

== Sports links ==
- Franz Beckert at Olympedia
- Franz Beckert at InterSportStats
