= Sparling =

Sparling is a surname. Notable people with the surname include:

- Chris Sparling (born 1977), American screenwriter and filmmaker
- Edward J. Sparling (1896–1981), American educator
- Gordon Sparling (1900–1994), (1900–1994)
- Henry Halliday Sparling (1860– 1924), British journalist and socialist
- Herbert Sparling (1864–1944), British actor and director
- Jack Sparling (1916–1997), Canadian comics artist
- John Sparling (born 1938), New Zealand cricketer
- Peter Sparling, American dancer and academic
- Rebecca Sparling (1910–1996), American materials engineer
- Sherri Sparling (born 1969), Canadian rugby union footballer

== See also ==
- O'Grady v. Sparling, a Supreme Court of Canada case
