= Thomas Andergassen =

German gymnast

- Born: 20 February 1980 (age 46) Lindau im Bodensee, West Germany

Gymnastics career
- Discipline: Men's artistic gymnastics
- Country represented: Germany; (2004–2008)
Medal record
Men's artistic gymnastics
Representing Germany
World Championships
Bronze medal – third place	2007 Stuttgart	Team

Thomas Andergassen (born 20 February 1980) is a German male artistic gymnast, representing his nation at international competitions. He participated at the 2004 Summer Olympics and at the 2008 Summer Olympics in Beijing, China. He also competed at world championships, including the 2006 World Artistic Gymnastics Championships and 2007 World Artistic Gymnastics Championships.
