= 2010 World Artistic Gymnastics Championships =

Gymnastics competition

2010 World Artistic Gymnastics Championships

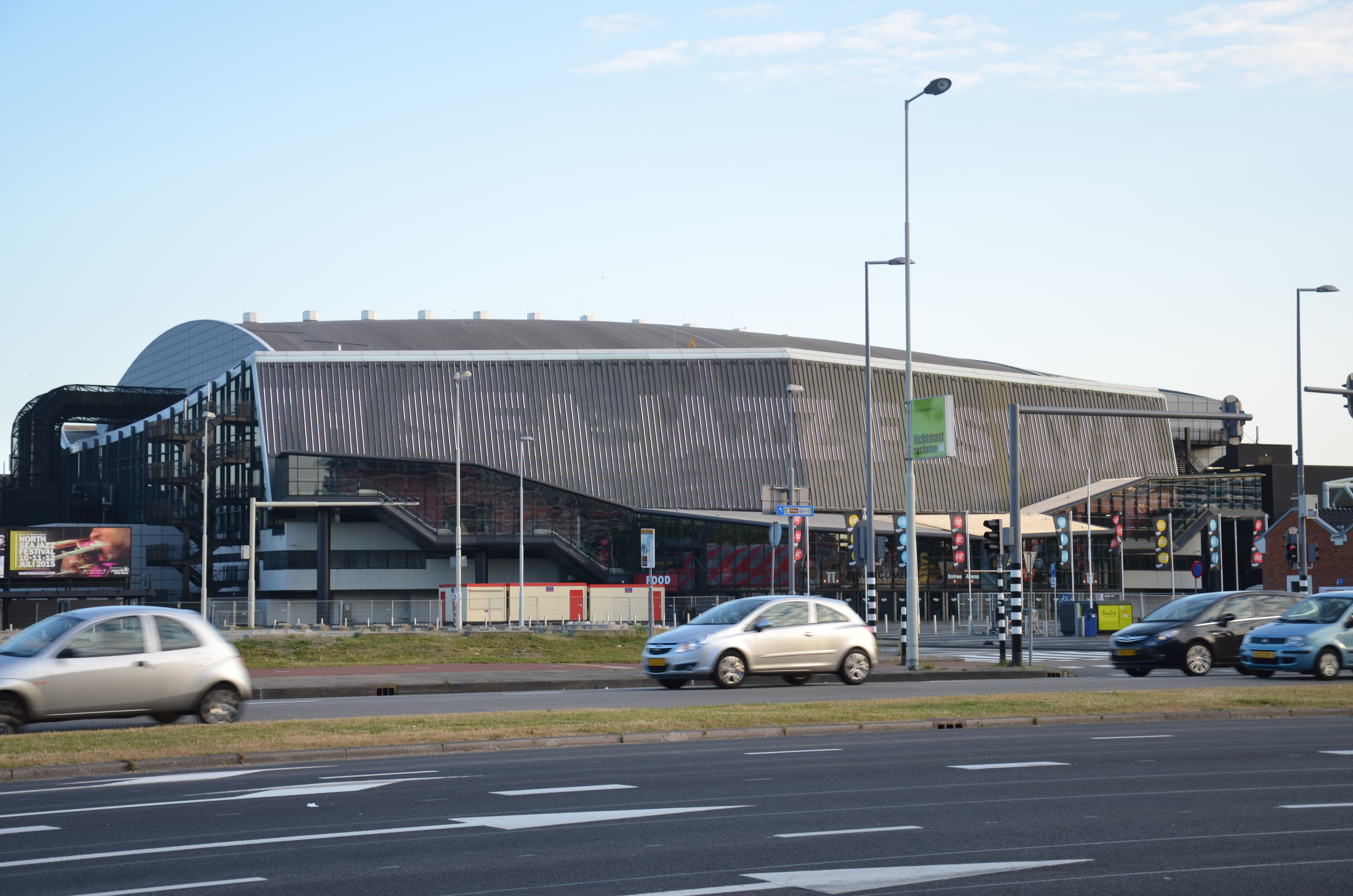
- Rotterdam Ahoy, where the competition took place
- Venue: Rotterdam Ahoy
- Location: Rotterdam, Netherlands
- Start date: 16 October 2010
- End date: 24 October 2010
- Competitors: 615

The 2010 World Artistic Gymnastics Championships was held at the Rotterdam Ahoy indoor sporting arena in the Netherlands from 16 to 24 October 2010. In this year's championships, there was a total of 73 participating federations with 615 gymnasts (343 men and 272 women). 53 men's and 44 women's teams competed.

== Competition schedule ==
The competition schedule was as follows (Local time, CEST):

Saturday, 16 October 2010
10:00 – 22:00 Women's qualifying competition

Sunday, 17 October 2010
10:00 – 19:15 Women's qualifying competition

Monday, 18 October 2010
09:00 – 22:15 Men's qualifying competition

Tuesday, 19 October 2010
09:00 – 22:15 Men's qualifying competition

Wednesday, 20 October 2010
17:00 – 19:00 Women's team final

Thursday, 21 October 2010
17:00 – 20:00 Men's team final

Friday, 22 October 2010
16:00 – 18:30 Men's all-round final
19:30 – 22:00 Women's all-round final

Saturday, 23 October 2010
14:00 – 18:00 Women's event finals: vault, bars
14:00 – 18:00 Men's event finals: floor, pommel horse, rings

Sunday, 24 October 2010
14:00 – 18:00 Women's event finals: beam, floor
14:00 – 18:00 Men's event finals: vault, bars, high bar

== Participating Countries ==
Some of the countries that participated.

- Algeria
- Argentina
- Austria
- Australia
- Belarus
- Belgium
- Brazil
- Bulgaria
- Canada
- China
- Colombia
- Czech Republic
- Denmark
- Egypt
- Finland
- France
- Germany
- (United Kingdom) Great Britain
- Greece
- Hungary
- Iceland
- Israel
- Italy
- Japan
- Kazakhstan
- Latvia
- Mexico
- Netherlands
- New Zealand
- Norway
- Poland
- Portugal
- Puerto Rico
- Romania
- Russia
- Slovakia
- Slovenia
- South Africa
- South Korea
- Spain
- Sweden
- Switzerland
- Turkey
- Ukraine
- United States
- Uzbekistan

== Gymnasts ==
More than 70 countries were expected to compete in the event.

Oldest and youngest competitors

Men	Name	Country	Date of birth	Age
Youngest	Hsu Ping-chien	Chinese Taipei	08/10/94	16 years
Oldest	Espen Jansen	Norway	13 December 1968	41 years

Women	Name	Country	Date of birth	Age
Youngest	Anna Dementyeva	Russia	28 December 1994	15 years
Oldest	Oksana Chusovitina	Germany	19 June 1975	35 years

== Medalists ==
Event	Gold	Silver	Bronze
Men
Team all-around	China; Chen Yibing; Feng Zhe; Teng Haibin; Yan Mingyong; Lü Bo; Zhang Chenglong	Japan; Kōhei Uchimura; Koji Yamamuro; Koji Uematsu; Kazuhito Tanaka; Kenya Kobayashi; Tatsuki Nakashima	Germany; Philipp Boy; Fabian Hambüchen; Thomas Taranu; Evgenij Spiridonov; Sebastian Krimmer; Matthias Fahrig
Individual all-around	Kōhei Uchimura (JPN)	Philipp Boy (GER)	Jonathan Horton (USA)
Floor	Eleftherios Kosmidis (GRE)	Kōhei Uchimura (JPN)	Daniel Purvis (GBR)
Pommel horse	Krisztián Berki (HUN)	Louis Smith (GBR)	Prashanth Sellathurai (AUS)
Rings	Chen Yibing (CHN)	Yan Mingyong (CHN)	Matteo Morandi (ITA)
Vault	Thomas Bouhail (FRA)	Anton Golotsutskov (RUS)	Dzmitry Kaspiarovich (BLR)
Parallel bars	Feng Zhe (CHN)	Teng Haibin (CHN)	Kōhei Uchimura (JPN)
Horizontal bar	Zhang Chenglong (CHN)	Epke Zonderland (NED)	Fabian Hambüchen (GER)
Women
Team all-around	Russia; Ksenia Afanasyeva; Aliya Mustafina; Tatiana Nabieva; Ksenia Semenova; Ekaterina Kurbatova; Anna Dementyeva	United States; Rebecca Bross; Mackenzie Caquatto; Bridget Sloan; Mattie Larson; Aly Raisman; Alicia Sacramone	China; Jiang Yuyuan; He Kexin; Sui Lu; Huang Qiushuang; Deng Linlin; Yang Yilin
Individual all-around	Aliya Mustafina (RUS)	Jiang Yuyuan (CHN)	Rebecca Bross (USA)
Vault	Alicia Sacramone (USA)	Aliya Mustafina (RUS)	Jade Barbosa (BRA)
Uneven bars	Beth Tweddle (GBR)	Aliya Mustafina (RUS)	Rebecca Bross (USA)
Balance beam	Ana Porgras (ROU)	Rebecca Bross (USA) Deng Linlin (CHN)	none awarded
Floor	Lauren Mitchell (AUS)	Aliya Mustafina (RUS) Diana Chelaru (ROU)	none awarded

== Men's results ==
=== Team all-around ===
Oldest and youngest competitors

	Name	Country	Date of birth	Age
Youngest	Yang Hak-Seon	South Korea	6 December 1992	17 years
Oldest	Evgenij Spiridonov	Germany	2 April 1982	28 years

The top three scores from each country for each apparatus was counted towards the total. In the qualifying round, the top four were counted. In all, 45 nations entered the qualifying round. Unlike the women's team event, there was more inconsistency in the strengths and weaknesses of the team. China qualified first overall; they came first in the parallel bars, second or third in three apparatuses, but tenth in the floor. Japan qualified second, 1.082 behind. They came first in rings, second or third in three disciplines and 11th in floor. The US were third, more than four points behind. They came first in high bar, but 13th in pommel horse, and between fourth and sixth in the other events. They were ahead of Great Britain by only 0.059. Great Britain came first in floor and pommel but were only ninth and tenth in parallel bars and rings respectively. Germany was fifth, followed by Russia, who came first in vault but were eighth or worse in three disciplines. The last two teams to qualify were Korea and France, the latter denying Romania qualification by 0.150, or 0.04%. Italy, Spain and Puerto Rico were all within 1.1 points of qualification. The hosts came 17th, more than six points outside qualification.

After qualifying in last place, France improved to finish fifth in the final, while Great Britain regressed from fourth to seventh.

Rank	Team	Floor (gymnastics)	Pommel horse	Rings (gymnastics)	Vault (gymnastics)	Parallel bars	Horizontal bar	Total
1st place, gold medalist(s)	China	44.333	43.099	46.800	47.999	46.733	46.033	274.997
1st place, gold medalist(s)	Chen Yibing	–	–	16.000	15.866	–	–	274.997
1st place, gold medalist(s)	Feng Zhe	14.700	–	–	16.100	15.900	15.133	274.997
1st place, gold medalist(s)	Teng Haibin	–	15.466	–	–	15.633	15.000	274.997
1st place, gold medalist(s)	Yan Mingyong	–	13.200	15.600	–	–	–	274.997
1st place, gold medalist(s)	Lü Bo	14.700	14.433	15.200	16.033	15.200	–	274.997
1st place, gold medalist(s)	Zhang Chenglong	14.933	–	–	–	–	15.900	274.997
2nd place, silver medalist(s)	Japan	44.198	44.633	44.532	48.183	46.624	45.599	273.769
2nd place, silver medalist(s)	Kōhei Uchimura	15.266	14.733	–	16.250	15.633	15.133	273.769
2nd place, silver medalist(s)	Koji Yamamuro	–	–	15.366	16.400	–	–	273.769
2nd place, silver medalist(s)	Koji Uematsu	14.766	–	–	15.533	15.533	16.033	273.769
2nd place, silver medalist(s)	Kazuhito Tanaka	–	–	14.166	–	15.458	14.433	273.769
2nd place, silver medalist(s)	Kenya Kobayashi	–	14.800	15.000	–	–	–	273.769
2nd place, silver medalist(s)	Tatsuki Nakashima	14.166	15.100	–	–	–	–	273.769
3rd place, bronze medalist(s)	Germany	44.032	43.132	44.857	47.799	45.333	46.099	271.252
3rd place, bronze medalist(s)	Philipp Boy	14.866	14.566	14.658	16.166	15.400	15.800	271.252
3rd place, bronze medalist(s)	Fabian Hambuechen	–	–	14.933	–	15.333	15.933	271.252
3rd place, bronze medalist(s)	Thomas Taranu	–	–	15.266	–	–	–	271.252
3rd place, bronze medalist(s)	Evgenij Spiridonov	14.100	13.600	–	–	–	14.366	271.252
3rd place, bronze medalist(s)	Sebastian Krimmer	–	14.966	–	15.533	14.600	–	271.252
3rd place, bronze medalist(s)	Matthias Fahrig	15.066	–	–	16.100	–	–	271.252
4	United States	43.566	40.032	44.833	47.566	45.016	46.999	268.012
4	Christopher Brooks	–	13.466	–	15.833	15.116	15.533	268.012
4	Christopher Cameron	–	13.100	13.800	–	–	–	268.012
4	Jonathan Horton	14.000	–	15.500	15.500	15.200	15.633	268.012
4	Steven Legendre	15.266	–	–	16.233	–	–	268.012
4	Danell Leyva	–	13.466	–	–	14.700	15.833	268.012
4	Brandon Wynn	14.300	–	15.533	–	–	–	268.012
5	France	42.132	43.598	43.399	46.357	44.483	43.499	263.468
5	Hamilton Sabot	–	14.266	14.400	–	15.075	14.900	263.468
5	Cyril Tommasone	12.766	15.466	–	–	14.808	–	263.468
5	Arnald Willig	–	13.866	14.633	15.258	14.600	13.733	263.468
5	Thomas Bouhail	14.833	–	–	16.066	–	–	263.468
5	Gaël Da Silva	14.533	–	14.366	15.033	–	14.866	263.468
6	Russia	42.466	42.599	44.374	46.899	44.566	41.266	263.170
6	Sergey Khorokhordin	–	14.233	14.866	–	14.900	13.533	263.170
6	Maxim Devyatovskiy	14.466	–	15.233	–	14.966	13.300	263.170
6	David Belyavskiy	13.100	14.800	–	15.700	14.700	14.433	263.170
6	Anton Golotsutskov	14.900	–	–	16.133	–	–	263.170
6	Igor Pakhomenko	–	14.566	14.275	–	–	–	263.170
6	Andrey Cherkasov	–	–	–	15.066	–	–	263.170
7	Great Britain	41.775	43.899	41.932	47.899	42.932	42.666	261.103
7	Kristian Thomas	13.200	–	14.333	–	–	14.333	261.103
7	Daniel Purvis	14.850	13.533	–	15.933	14.766	14.233	261.103
7	Samuel Hunter	–	14.566	–	–	13.566	14.100	261.103
7	Theo Seager	13.725	–	13.266	15.900	–	–	261.103
7	Ruslan Panteleymonov	–	–	14.333	16.066	14.600	–	261.103
7	Louis Smith	–	15.800	–	–	–	–	261.103
8	South Korea	42.433	41.099	42.649	48.132	42.999	42.640	259.952
8	Yoo Won-chul	–	–	14.833	–	14.600	12.466	259.952
8	Kim Ji-Hoon	14.100	13.133	–	–	–	15.308	259.952
8	Sin Seob	–	–	14.100	–	–	–	259.952
8	Kim Soo-Myun	14.833	13.500	–	15.833	14.566	14.866	259.952
8	Yang Hak-Seon	13.500	–	13.666	16.666	–	–	259.952
8	Ha Chang-Ju	–	14.466	–	15.633	13.833	–	259.952

=== Individual all-around ===
In all 299 men competed in the qualifying round. Of these 164 complete all six apparatus. Each nation had up to six entrants, but were limited to two qualifiers for the 24-man final. Steven Legendre of the US, Kenya Kobayashi of Japan and Kristian Thomas of Great Britain ended 15th, 16th and 17th respectively, but were their nation's third best and did not progress to the final. Ruslan Paneleymonov (Britain, 19th) and Andrey Cherkasov (Russia, 21st) were the others affected by this policy. Kōhei Uchimura was the highest qualifier, more than two points ahead of Philipp Boy.

Oldest and youngest competitors

	Name	Country	Date of birth	Age
Youngest	Danell Leyva	United States	30 October 1991	18 years
Oldest	Evgenij Spiridonov	Germany	2 April 1982	28 years

Rank	Gymnast	Floor (gymnastics)	Pommel horse	Rings (gymnastics)	Vault (gymnastics)	Parallel bars	Horizontal bar	Total
1st place, gold medalist(s)	Kōhei Uchimura (JPN)	15.566	15.000	15.133	16.266	15.300	15.066	92.331
2nd place, silver medalist(s)	Philipp Boy (GER)	15.000	14.666	14.566	15.650	15.166	15.000	90.048
3rd place, bronze medalist(s)	Jonathan Horton (USA)	14.866	13.833	15.366	15.566	15.200	15.033	89.864
4	Mykola Kuksenkov (UKR)	14.666	14.766	14.600	15.700	14.933	15.166	89.831
5	Daniel Purvis (GBR)	15.066	14.300	14.166	15.900	14.933	14.600	88.965
6	Lu Bo (CHN)	14.366	14.366	14.800	16.033	14.766	14.633	88.964
7	Sergey Khorokhordin (RUS)	14.433	14.466	14.933	15.466	14.066	15.300	88.664
8	Koji Uematsu (JPN)	14.566	14.200	13.733	15.556	15.533	14.800	88.398
9	Samuel Hunter (GBR)	14.433	14.966	14.033	15.600	14.700	14.633	88.365
10	Alexander Shatilov (ISR)	15.200	14.066	13.941	15.666	14.666	14.666	88.205
11	Teng Haibin (CHN)	14.033	14.000	14.033	15.791	15.533	14.766	88.156
12	Kim Soo-Myun (KOR)	13.700	15.000	13.733	15.966	14.800	14.800	87.999
13	Cyril Tommasone (FRA)	14.100	15.533	14.091	15.333	14.633	13.866	87.556
14	Anton Fokin (UZB)	14.083	14.466	14.133	15.683	15.133	13.933	87.431
15	Tomás González (CHI)	15.191	13.366	14.466	15.966	14.400	13.833	87.222
16	Flavius Koczi (ROU)	14.266	13.900	14.375	16.433	14.650	13.333	86.957
17	Evgenij Spiridonov (GER)	14.166	14.466	14.200	15.383	14.333	14.500	86.498
18	Danell Leyva (USA)	14.733	12.900	14.325	15.666	13.566	15.666	86.856
19	Maxim Devyatovskiy (RUS)	14.900	11.116	15.066	16.066	15.033	14.566	86.797
20	Dzmitry Savitski (BLR)	13.816	14.000	14.566	15.500	14.950	13.900	86.732
21	Yoo Won-chul (KOR)	13.633	12.500	14.825	15.500	14.866	15.066	86.390
22	Luis Vargas Velásquez (PUR)	13.100	14.133	13.933	15.516	14.733	14.833	86.248
23	Luis Rivera (PUR)	14.400	14.100	14.866	15.900	12.533	13.700	85.499
24	Sergio Muñoz (ESP)	13.336	12.666	14.466	15.900	12.900	14.466	83.764

=== Floor ===
Oldest and youngest competitors

	Name	Country	Date of birth	Age
Youngest	Eleftherios Kosmidis	Greece	6 May 1991	19 years
Oldest	Thomas Bouhail	France	3 July 1986	24 years

Rank	Gymnast	D Score	E Score	Pen.	Total
1st place, gold medalist(s)	Eleftherios Kosmidis (GRE)	6.600	9.100		15.700
2nd place, silver medalist(s)	Kōhei Uchimura (JPN)	6.500	9.033		15.533
3rd place, bronze medalist(s)	Daniel Purvis (GBR)	6.500	8.866		15.366
4	Alexander Shatilov (ISR)	6.400	8.933		15.333
5	Thomas Bouhail (FRA)	6.100	9.100		15.200
6	Eddie Penev (BUL)	6.600	8.566	0.100	15.066
7	Flavius Koczi (ROU)	6.200	8.866		15.066
8	Steven Legendre (USA)	6.300	7.300		13.600

=== Pommel horse ===
Oldest and youngest competitors

	Name	Country	Date of birth	Age
Youngest	Louis Smith	Great Britain (United Kingdom)	22 April 1989	21 years
Oldest	Sašo Bertoncelj	Slovenia	16 July 1984	26 years

Rank	Gymnast	D Score	E Score	Pen.	Total
1st place, gold medalist(s)	Krisztián Berki (HUN)	6.700	9.133		15.833
2nd place, silver medalist(s)	Louis Smith (GBR)	6.900	8.833		15.733
3rd place, bronze medalist(s)	Prashanth Sellathurai (AUS)	6.600	8.966		15.566
4	Cyril Tommasone (FRA)	6.500	8.933		15.433
5	Filip Ude (CRO)	6.300	9.016		15.316
6	Harutyun Merdinyan (ARM)	6.400	8.766		15.166
7	Donna Donny Truyens (BEL)	5.600	8.533		14.133
8	Sašo Bertoncelj (SVN)	6.200	7.733		13.933

=== Rings ===
Oldest and youngest competitors

	Name	Country	Date of birth	Age
Youngest	Koji Yamamuro	Japan	17 January 1989	21 years
Oldest	Matteo Morandi	Italy	8 October 1981	29 years

Rank	Gymnast	D Score	E Score	Pen.	Total
1st place, gold medalist(s)	Chen Yibing (CHN)	6.800	9.100		15.900
2nd place, silver medalist(s)	Yan Mingyong (CHN)	6.800	8.900		15.700
3rd place, bronze medalist(s)	Matteo Morandi (ITA)	6.700	8.966		15.666
4	Koji Yamamuro (JPN)	6.700	8.800		15.500
5	Yoo Won-chul (KOR)	6.600	8.833		15.433
6	Ivan San Miguel (ESP)	6.500	8.833		15.333
7	Kenya Kobayashi (JPN)	6.400	8.900		15.300
8	Chen Chih Yu (TPE)	6.700	8.566		15.266

=== Vault ===
Oldest and youngest competitors

	Name	Country	Date of birth	Age
Youngest	Yang Hak-Seon	South Korea	6 December 1992	17 years
Oldest	Dzmitry Kaspiarovich	Belarus	15 October 1977	33 years

Thomas Bouhail became the first French gymnast to become a world champion.

Rank	Gymnast	D Score	Pen.	E Score	Score 1	D Score	Pen.	E Score	Score 2	Total
1st place, gold medalist(s)	Thomas Bouhail (FRA)	7.000		9.366	16.366	7.000		9.533	16.533	16.449
2nd place, silver medalist(s)	Anton Golotsutskov (RUS)	7.000		9.433	16.433	7.000		9.300	16.300	16.366
3rd place, bronze medalist(s)	Dzmitry Kaspiarovich (BLR)	7.000		9.233	16.233	7.000		9.400	16.400	16.316
4	Yang Hak-Seon (KOR)	7.000		9.400	16.400	7.000		9.133	16.133	16.266
5	Flavius Koczi (ROU)	7.000		9.233	16.233	7.000		9.183	16.183	16.208
6	Andriy Isayev (UKR)	6.600		9.266	15.866	7.000		9.233	16.233	16.049
7	Luis Rivera (PUR)	6.600		9.375	15.975	6.600		9.316	15.916	15.945
8	Jeffrey Wammes (NED)	6.800	.1	9.300	16.000	6.600		8.900	15.500	15.750
Rank	Gymnast	Vault 1				Vault 2				

=== Parallel bars ===
Oldest and youngest competitors

	Name	Country	Date of birth	Age
Youngest	Kōhei Uchimura	Japan	3 January 1989	21 years
Oldest	Ildar Valeiev	Kazakhstan	18 February 1974	36 years

Rank	Gymnast	D Score	E Score	Pen.	Total
1st place, gold medalist(s)	Feng Zhe (CHN)	6.700	9.266		15.966
2nd place, silver medalist(s)	Teng Haibin (CHN)	6.400	9.216		15.616
3rd place, bronze medalist(s)	Kōhei Uchimura (JPN)	6.400	9.100		15.500
4	Fabian Hambüchen (GER)	6.300	9.066		15.366
5	Koji Uematsu (JPN)	6.500	8.733		15.233
6	Adam Kierzkowski (POL)	6.000	9.200		15.200
7	Ildar Valeiev (KAZ)	6.900	8.283		15.183
8	Samuel Piasecký (SVK)	6.300	8.866		15.166

=== Horizontal bar ===
Oldest and youngest competitors

	Name	Country	Date of birth	Age
Youngest	Danell Leyva	United States	30 October 1991	18 years
Oldest	Epke Zonderland	Netherlands	16 April 1986	24 years

Zhang Chenglong of China edged out local favorite Epke Zonderland by 0.133 to win this event.

Rank	Gymnast	D Score	E Score	Pen.	Total
1st place, gold medalist(s)	Zhang Chenglong (CHN)	7.500	8.666		16.166
2nd place, silver medalist(s)	Epke Zonderland (NED)	7.300	8.733		16.033
3rd place, bronze medalist(s)	Fabian Hambüchen (GER)	7.100	8.866		15.966
4	Philipp Boy (GER)	7.300	8.533		15.833
5	Danell Leyva (USA)	7.100	8.566		15.666
6	Christopher Brooks (USA)	6.600	8.783		15.383
7	Feng Zhe (CHN)	6.600	8.566		15.166
8	Koji Uematsu (JPN)	7.200	6.800		14.000

== Women's results ==
=== Team all-around ===
Oldest and youngest competitors

	Name	Country	Date of birth	Age
Youngest	Anna Dementyeva	Russia	28 December 1994	15 years
Oldest	Elizabeth Tweddle	Great Britain (United Kingdom)	1 April 1985	25 years

As with the men, the top three scores from each country for each apparatus was counted towards the total. In the qualifying round, the top four scores were included. In all, 34 nations entered the qualifying round. Russia came second in each of the four disciplines to qualify first overall. China came first in the uneven bars and third and fourth in the remaining apparatus, to qualify second overall. The United States was first in vault and beam, but only fifth in floor, and came third overall. Less than one point separated the top three. Romania came first in floor to qualify fourth, more than five points behind the US. There were more than 3 points down to the next two qualifiers, Great Britain and Australia. The host nation missed qualification by 1.6 points.

Russia won their first ever women's team title. It was a close-run contest with the result hinging on Russia's final floor performer. In the final, the US came sixth in the floor, losing 2.666 to Russia and 1.566 to China on this apparatus. The US' third-best floor score was the lowest of the 24 included scores for the apparatus. After qualifying in last place, Japan improved to finish fifth in the final. He Kexin of China posted the highest score of the meet on the uneven bars, scoring a 16.133 in the team finals. This made her the only female gymnast of the meet to score in the 16's.

Rank	Team	Vault (gymnastics)	Uneven bars	Balance beam	Floor (gymnastics)	Total
1st place, gold medalist(s)	Russia	45.766(1)	41.899(7)	43.733(2)	43.999(1)	175.397
1st place, gold medalist(s)	Aliya Mustafina	15.633	15.600	15.033	14.666	175.397
1st place, gold medalist(s)	Anna Dementyeva	–	13.366	14.400	14.533	175.397
1st place, gold medalist(s)	Tatiana Nabieva	15.400	12.933	–	–	175.397
1st place, gold medalist(s)	Ksenia Afanasyeva	–	–	–	14.800	175.397
1st place, gold medalist(s)	Ekaterina Kurbatova	14.733	–	–	–	175.397
1st place, gold medalist(s)	Ksenia Semenova	–	–	14.300	–	175.397
2nd place, silver medalist(s)	United States	45.666(2)	44.065(2)	43.799(1)	41.666(6)	175.196
2nd place, silver medalist(s)	Rebecca Bross	–	14.833	14.866	14.633	175.196
2nd place, silver medalist(s)	Aly Raisman	15.066	–	14.333	14.500	175.196
2nd place, silver medalist(s)	Alicia Sacramone	15.600	–	14.600	–	175.196
2nd place, silver medalist(s)	Mackenzie Caquatto	15.000	14.666	–	–	175.196
2nd place, silver medalist(s)	Bridget Sloan	–	14.566	–	–	175.196
2nd place, silver medalist(s)	Mattie Larson	–	–	–	12.533	175.196
3rd place, bronze medalist(s)	China	44.666(3)	44.316(1)	42.566(4)	43.233(2)	174.781
3rd place, bronze medalist(s)	Jiang Yuyuan	14.900	13.433	14.866	14.500	174.781
3rd place, bronze medalist(s)	Huang Qiushuang	14.800	14.750	–	14.000	174.781
3rd place, bronze medalist(s)	Sui Lu	–	–	13.000	14.733	174.781
3rd place, bronze medalist(s)	He Kexin	–	16.133	–	–	174.781
3rd place, bronze medalist(s)	Yang Yilin	14.966	–	–	–	174.781
3rd place, bronze medalist(s)	Deng Linlin	–	–	14.700	–	174.781
4	Romania	44.266(4)	42.232(6)	43.532(3)	43.066(3)	173.096
4	Ana Porgras	–	14.466	15.066	14.133	173.096
4	Sandra Izbașa	14.700	–	14.333	14.200	173.096
4	Diana Chelaru	14.700	–	–	14.733	173.096
4	Raluca Haidu	14.866	13.700	–	–	173.096
4	Gabriela Drăgoi	–	14.066	14.133	–	173.096
4	Cerasela Pătrașcu	–	–	–	–	173.096
5	Japan	43.066(7)	43.633(4)	41.232(5)	40.966(7)	168.897
5	Rie Tanaka	14.300	14.433	13.900	13.400	168.897
5	Koko Tsurumi	13.866	14.900	13.366	13.866	168.897
5	Yuko Shintake	–	14.300	13.966	–	168.897
5	Momoko Ozawa	14.900	–	–	–	168.897
5	Mai Yamagishi	–	–	–	13.700	168.897
5	Kyoko Oshima	–	–	–	–	168.897
6	Australia	43.499(6)	42.533(5)	40.598(6)	41.999(5)	168.629
6	Lauren Mitchell	14.800	14.100	13.866	14.700	168.629
6	Georgia Bonora	13.833	13.933	12.866	13.633	168.629
6	Ashleigh Brennan	–	–	13.866	13.666	168.629
6	Emily Little	14.866	–	–	–	168.629
6	Larissa Miller	–	14.500	–	–	168.629
6	Georgia Wheeler	–	–	–	–	168.629
7	Great Britain	43.732(5)	42.699(3)	37.632(8)	42.765(4)	166.828
7	Hannah Whelan	–	13.900	14.133	14.066	166.828
7	Imogen Cairns	14.633	–	11.833	14.033	166.828
7	Nicole Hibbert	14.366	13.066	11.666	–	166.828
7	Elizabeth Tweddle	–	15.733	–	14.666	166.828
7	Rebecca Downie	14.733	–	–	–	166.828
7	Jennifer Pinches	–	–	–	–	166.828
8	Italy	41.965(8)	41.032(8)	39.666(7)	40.766(8)	163.429
8	Serena Licchetta	14.066	13.300	12.166	13.633	163.429
8	Vanessa Ferrari	13.966	14.066	–	14.333	163.429
8	Elisabetta Preziosa	13.933	–	14.000	–	163.429
8	Lia Parolari	–	–	13.500	12.800	163.429
8	Eleonora Rando	–	13.666	–	–	163.429
8	Jessica Mattoni	–	–	–	–	163.429

=== Individual all-around ===
In all 216 women competed in the qualifying round. Of these 142 completed all four apparatus. Each nation had up to six entrants, but were limited to two qualifiers for the 24-woman final. The highest ranked person affected by this was Mackenzie Caquatto, who was the third highest American. She finished ninth, less than 1.2 from the third highest qualifier. Mattie Larson (USA, 11th), Ksenia Afanasyeva (Russia, 17th) and Emily Little (Australia, 23rd) were the others in the top 24 to be excluded from the final. Aliya Mustafina qualified first, 1.585 ahead of Rebecca Bross. Aly Raisman qualified third, but she fell in the uneven bars in the final, and came equal last in that apparatus to end up 13th overall. Jiang Yuyuan qualified fourth, but placed second in the final.

Oldest and youngest competitors

	Name	Country	Date of birth	Age
Youngest	Celine Van Gerner	Netherlands	1 December 1994	15 years
Oldest	Daniele Hypólito	Brazil	8 September 1984	26 years

Rank	Gymnast	Vault (gymnastics)	Uneven bars	Balance beam	Floor (gymnastics)	Total
1st place, gold medalist(s)	Aliya Mustafina (RUS)	15.666	15.300	15.033	15.033	61.032
2nd place, silver medalist(s)	Jiang Yuyuan (CHN)	14.833	15.533	15.066	14.566	59.998
3rd place, bronze medalist(s)	Rebecca Bross (USA)	14.700	14.933	14.100	15.233	58.966
4	Huang Qiushuang (CHN)	14.766	15.200	14.700	13.700	58.366
5	Ana Porgras (ROU)	13.966	14.466	15.433	14.300	58.165
6	Lauren Mitchell (AUS)	14.733	13.900	14.900	14.600	58.133
7	Tatiana Nabieva (RUS)	15.466	15.133	13.266	13.433	57.298
8	Ariella Käslin (SUI)	15.300	13.700	14.200	13.700	56.900
9	Raluca Haidu (ROU)	14.666	13.400	14.466	13.800	56.332
10	Jessica López (VEN)	14.433	13.966	13.866	14.033	56.298
11	Vanessa Ferrari (ITA)	13.833	13.866	14.233	14.233	56.165
12	Elisabeth Seitz (GER)	14.766	14.733	13.458	13.200	56.157
13	Aly Raisman (USA)	14.900	11.700	14.466	14.633	55.699
14	Georgia Bonora (AUS)	13.966	13.833	14.466	13.433	55.698
15	Jade Barbosa (BRA)	14.866	12.900	14.166	13.733	55.665
16	Hannah Whelan (GBR)	13.866	13.433	14.200	14.000	55.499
17	Rie Tanaka (JPN)	14.033	14.066	13.900	13.333	55.332
18	Daniele Hypólito (BRA)	14.100	13.000	14.066	14.100	55.266
19	Céline Van Gerner (NED)	13.866	14.100	13.000	14.200	55.166
20	Marta Pihan-Kulesza (POL)	13.766	12.500	14.333	14.133	54.732
21	Koko Tsurumi (JPN)	13.866	12.900	14.600	13.300	54.666
22	Nicole Hibbert (GBR)	13.966	14.000	13.200	13.400	54.566
23	Aurélie Malaussena (FRA)	14.166	13.966	14.033	12.100	54.265
24	Elisabetta Preziosa (ITA)	13.933	11.700	14.200	13.100	52.933

=== Vault ===
Oldest and youngest competitors

	Name	Country	Date of birth	Age
Youngest	Tatiana Nabieva	Russia	21 November 1994	15 years
Oldest	Ariella Käslin	Switzerland	11 October 1987	23 years

Tatiana Nabieva's assistant coach Alexander Kiryashov contested Nabieva's reduced start value on her first vault. Nabieva's 1st vault's S.V. was a 6.5, attempting a 2.5 twist, but was brought down to a 5.8 when she did not complete the twist. Her 2nd vault had originally had a 6.1 start value, but then she was penalized once again for piking her form and landing out of bounds and was brought down to a 5.7.

Rank	Gymnast	D Score	E Score	Pen.	Score 1	D Score	E Score	Pen.	Score 2	Total
1st place, gold medalist(s)	Alicia Sacramone (USA)	6.300	9.100		15.400	5.800	9.200		15.000	15.200
2nd place, silver medalist(s)	Aliya Mustafina (RUS)	6.500	9.233		15.733	5.700	8.800	0.1	14.400	15.066
3rd place, bronze medalist(s)	Jade Barbosa (BRA)	5.800	9.133		14.933	5.600	9.066		14.666	14.799
4	Ariella Käslin (SUI)	6.300	8.866		15.166	5.800	8.700	0.1	14.400	14.783
5	Tatiana Nabieva (RUS)	5.800	8.933		14.733	5.700	8.866	0.1	14.466	14.599
6	Jo Hyun-joo (KOR)	5.600	8.700		14.300	5.800	8.866		14.666	14.483
7	Diana Chelaru (ROU)	5.800	8.900		14.700	4.800	8.633		13.433	14.066
8	Imogen Cairns (GBR)	5.300	9.133		14.433	4.800	8.766		13.566	13.999
Rank	Gymnast	Vault 1				Vault 2				Total

=== Uneven bars ===
Oldest and youngest competitors

	Name	Country	Date of birth	Age
Youngest	Aliya Mustafina	Russia	30 September 1994	16 years
Oldest	Elizabeth Tweddle	Great Britain (United Kingdom)	1 April 1985	25 years

Rank	Gymnast	D Score	E Score	Pen.	Total
1st place, gold medalist(s)	Elizabeth Tweddle (GBR)	6.800	8.933		15.733
2nd place, silver medalist(s)	Aliya Mustafina (RUS)	6.800	8.800		15.600
3rd place, bronze medalist(s)	Rebecca Bross (USA)	6.200	8.866		15.066
4	Bridget Sloan (USA)	6.000	8.666		14.666
5	Ana Porgras (ROU)	6.200	8.400		14.600
6	Huang Qiushuang (CHN)	7.000	7.400		14.400
7	He Kexin (CHN)	6.300	7.666		13.966
8	Elisabeth Seitz (GER)	4.200	6.266		10.466

=== Balance beam ===
Oldest and youngest competitors

	Name	Country	Date of birth	Age
Youngest	Anna Dementyeva	Russia	28 December 1994	15 years
Oldest	Alicia Sacramone	United States	3 December 1987	22 years

Rank	Gymnast	D Score	E Score	Pen.	Total
1st place, gold medalist(s)	Ana Porgras (ROU)	6.500	8.866		15.366
2nd place, silver medalist(s)	Rebecca Bross (USA)	6.500	8.733		15.233
2nd place, silver medalist(s)	Deng Linlin (CHN)	6.600	8.633		15.233
4	Lauren Mitchell (AUS)	6.600	8.600		15.200
5	Alicia Sacramone (USA)	6.100	8.966		15.066
6	Anna Dementyeva (RUS)	6.200	7.766		13.966
7	Aliya Mustafina (RUS)	5.900	7.866		13.766
8	Yana Demyanchuk (UKR)	6.200	7.533		13.733

=== Floor ===
Oldest and youngest competitors

	Name	Country	Date of birth	Age
Youngest	Aliya Mustafina	Russia	30 September 1994	16 years
Oldest	Sandra Izbașa	Romania	18 June 1990	20 years

Lauren Mitchell became the first Australian female world champion in gymnastics, posting the highest score after being last to perform in the final. Defending champion Beth Tweddle of Great Britain failed to qualify, she was a reserve for the final.

Rank	Gymnast	D Score	E Score	Pen.	Total
1st place, gold medalist(s)	Lauren Mitchell (AUS)	5.900	8.933		14.833
2nd place, silver medalist(s)	Diana Chelaru (ROU)	6.000	8.766		14.766
2nd place, silver medalist(s)	Aliya Mustafina (RUS)	5.800	8.966		14.766
4	Aly Raisman (USA)	5.700	9.016		14.716
5	Sui Lu (CHN)	5.700	8.966		14.666
6	Vanessa Ferrari (ITA)	5.500	9.100		14.600
7	Sandra Izbașa (ROU)	5.900	8.833	0.8	13.933
8	Ksenia Afanasyeva (RUS)	5.800	6.900		12.700

== Medal table ==
Women's all-around champion Aliya Mustafina won three individual apparatus medals, accounting for four of Russia's five medals in individual events. Men's all-around champion Kōhei Uchimura was involved in all of Japan's four medals, one of them a silver in the teams event.

=== Overall ===
Rank	Nation	Gold	Silver	Bronze	Total
1	China	4	4	1	9
2	Russia	2	4	0	6
3	United States	1	2	3	6
4	Japan	1	2	1	4
5	Great Britain	1	1	1	3
6	Romania	1	1	0	2
7	Australia	1	0	1	2
8	France	1	0	0	1
8	Greece	1	0	0	1
8	Hungary	1	0	0	1
11	Germany	0	1	2	3
12	Netherlands	0	1	0	1
13	Belarus	0	0	1	1
13	Brazil	0	0	1	1
13	Italy	0	0	1	1
Totals (15 entries)		14	16	12	42

=== Men ===
Rank	Nation	Gold	Silver	Bronze	Total
1	China	4	2	0	6
2	Japan	1	2	1	4
3	France	1	0	0	1
3	Greece	1	0	0	1
3	Hungary	1	0	0	1
6	Germany	0	1	2	3
7	Great Britain	0	1	1	2
8	Netherlands	0	1	0	1
8	Russia	0	1	0	1
10	Australia	0	0	1	1
10	Belarus	0	0	1	1
10	Italy	0	0	1	1
10	United States	0	0	1	1
Totals (13 entries)		8	8	8	24

=== Women ===
Rank	Nation	Gold	Silver	Bronze	Total
1	Russia	2	3	0	5
2	United States	1	2	2	5
3	Romania	1	1	0	2
4	Australia	1	0	0	1
4	Great Britain	1	0	0	1
6	China	0	2	1	3
7	Brazil	0	0	1	1
Totals (7 entries)		6	8	4	18

== See also ==
- 2010 European Men's Artistic Gymnastics Championships
- 2010 European Women's Artistic Gymnastics Championships
