= Philipp Boy =

German artistic gymnast

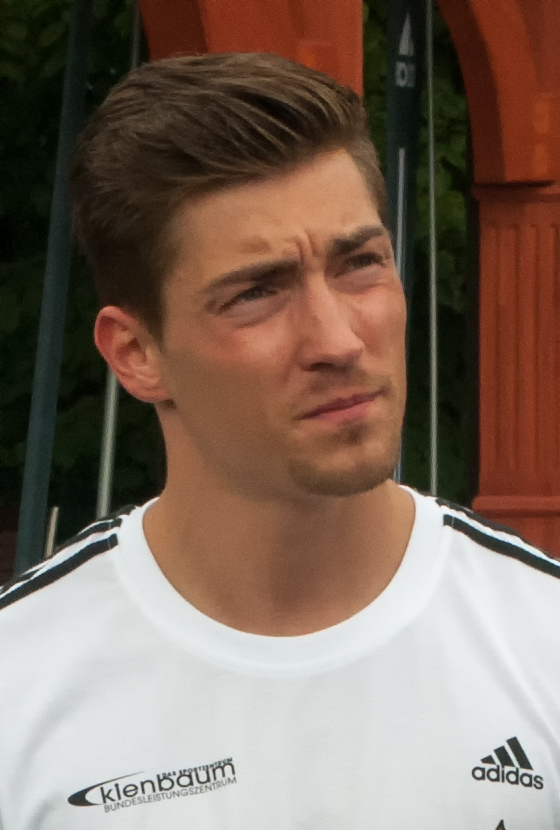
- Boy 2012 in Kienbaum

Personal information
- Full name: Philipp Boy
- Born: 23 July 1987 (age 39) Schwedt, Bezirk Frankfurt, East Germany
- Height: 172 cm (5 ft 8 in)

Gymnastics career
- Discipline: Men's artistic gymnastics
- Country represented: Germany
- Club: SC Cottbus
- Head coach: Andreas Hirsch
- Assistant coach: Karsten Oelsch
- Retired: 2012
Medal record
Representing Germany
World Championships
Silver medal – second place	2010 Rotterdam	All-Around
Silver medal – second place	2011 Tokyo	All-Around
Bronze medal – third place	2007 Stuttgart	Team
Bronze medal – third place	2010 Rotterdam	Team
European Championships
Gold medal – first place	2010 Birmingham	Team
Gold medal – first place	2011 Berlin	All-Around
Silver medal – second place	2008 Lausanne	Team
Silver medal – second place	2011 Berlin	High Bar
Bronze medal – third place	2010 Birmingham	High Bar

Philipp Boy (born 23 July 1987 in Schwedt, East Germany) is a former German gymnast.

He was a member of the 2007 and 2010 World bronze medal-winning teams. In addition, he won back-to-back silver medals in the World All Around competition (2010 and 2011). He is the 2011 European All Around Champion. In the 2011 World Championships, Boy won the silver all-around because of his high bar routine. He received a score of 16.066, the highest score on the horizontal bar.

== Gymnastics career ==
=== 2007 ===
The German men's team won bronze at the World Championships. Boy finished 18th in the individual all-around final.

=== 2008 ===
The German team placed second at the European Championships. Boy was part of the German Olympic team. He placed 13th in the individual all-around finals.

=== 2009 ===
Boy placed fourth in the individual all-around finals at the European Championships.

=== 2010 ===
Boy was part of the team that finished first in the team all-around at the European Championships. He also tied for the bronze medal on high bar with countryman Fabian Hambüchen.

At the World Championships in Rotterdam, the men's team won the bronze medal. Boy won a silver medal in the individual all-around competition. He also qualified to the high bar finals, where he finished fourth.

=== 2011 ===
Boy won the individual all-around title and silver medal in the high bar final at the European Championships.

At the World Championships in Tokyo, the German team placed sixth in the team final. Boy again placed second in the individual all-around behind Kōhei Uchimura. He also qualified for the high bar final, where he placed seventh.

=== 2012 ===
The German team placed sixth at the European Championships. He qualified for the high bar finals and finished eighth.

Boy competed as part of the German Olympic team. The German men's team qualified for the finals in fourth place, but placed seventh in the team finals. Boy competed in the qualification for all-around finals and placed 17th, but was prevented from competing in the all-around finals by the two-per-country rule, as Fabian Hambüchen (3rd) and Marcel Nguyen (7th) placed ahead of him.

On 1 December 2012, Boy announced his retirement from competitive sports.

== Post-gymnastics career ==
=== Ninja Warrior ===
In 2017, he participated in Ninja Warrior Germany on RTL and failed in the Qualification at the second Obstacle. In 2018, he reached Round 2 semifinal qualification. In 2019, he reached the final with his best result.

=== Celebrity Ninja Warrior ===
He participated in 2017, 2018, 2019, and 2024. All four times he reached second place.
